= Cyclone Murasu =

North Indian Ocean cyclone in 2026

Severe Cyclonic Storm Murasu
- Murasu near its peak intensity approaching southeastern India on 2 November

Meteorological history
- Formed: 31 October 2026
- Dissipated: 4 November 2026

Severe cyclonic storm
- 3-minute sustained (IMD)
- Highest winds: 100 km/h (65 mph)
- Lowest pressure: 986 hPa (mbar); 29.12 inHg

Category 2-equivalent tropical cyclone
- 1-minute sustained (SSHWS/JTWC)
- Highest winds: 155 km/h (100 mph)
- Lowest pressure: 973 hPa (mbar); 28.73 inHg

Overall effects
- Fatalities: 17+
- Damage: ≥$203 million (2026 USD)
- Areas affected: Andhra Pradesh; Tamil Nadu; Telangana
- Part of the 2026 North Indian Ocean cyclone season

Severe Cyclonic Storm Murasu (Note: The name Murasu (Tamil: முரசு; [mʊɾəsu]) was contributed by India and means "drum" in the Tamil language, referring to a traditional percussion instrument of the Tamil people.) was a robust tropical cyclone that affected South India. It is the ninth depression and the second cyclone of the 2026 North Indian Ocean cyclone season after Cyclone Arnab, which also battered the south-eastern coast of India less than a week before. Traversing the Bay of Bengal east to west, the system originated as a low-pressure area over Andaman Sea on 29 October 2026 at the same time Arnab's remnants were dissipating inland.

The system intensified into Cyclonic Storm Murasu over south-central Bay of Bengal on 1 November en route to Indian state of Andhra Pradesh, and steered by the anticyclones of the subtropical ridge, followed a north-west trajectory towards southern Coastal Andhra. Murasu further intensified into a Severe Cyclonic Storm, before making landfall between Bapatla and Prakasam districts on 2 November with peak intensity. The remnants moved northwards and weakened into a Depression on 3 November, and dissipated over south-eastern Telangana by 5 November.

The India Meteorological Department (IMD) alarmed 48 districts across the states of Andhra Pradesh, Telangana, southern Odisha, and north-east Tamil Nadu for varying degrees of heavy rainfall, strong winds, and storm surge, from 2 to 4 November. Bracing for impact, the aforementioned states mobilised disaster response teams and other departments to engage in proactive measures and mitigation, wherein 200,000 people were evacuated from high-risk areas in Andhra Pradesh and Odisha. Various district magistrates announced holidays for schools and colleges on the concerned days, and established 24-hour control rooms to monitor the situation. A number of trains and flights between Chennai, Vijayawada, Visakhapatnam, and Tirupati were cancelled or diverted.

Andhra Pradesh suffered the heaviest toll under Murasu's impact, mainly in Prakasam, Bapatla, Guntur, and Palnadu districts, amounting to an economic loss of ₹1918.6 crores (US$203.1 million). Around 149,871 hectares of the state's agricultural farms and plantations, over 60,000 electric poles and telecommunication towers, and 983 houses were damaged, as well as a power blackout in 4,095 villages, and eight fatalities. It also delayed the results of the state's 2026 urban bodies elections in the Ongole Municipal Corporation, and the municipalities of Chimakurthy, Addanki, Darsi, Repalle, and Chirala. Prolonged rainfall before, during, and after Murasu's landfall was the major cause of damage. Turbulent inflows into river basins disrupted vehicular movement in NTR, Konaseema, Kakinada, and Nellore districts, as well as in Telangana's Khammam and Bhadradri Kothagudem districts, where 37,636 hectares of crops were inundated. In Tamil Nadu, Chennai and Tiruvallur districts experienced widespread water-logging, and nine fishermen from Royapuram Fishing Harbour died after their trawler capsized at sea near Prakasam district during Murasu's landfall. Indian mainstream media nicknamed Murasu and Arnab as "twin cyclones", owing to their consecutive and compounded impact on Andhra Pradesh within a week.

== Meteorological history ==
Map plotting the storm's track and intensity, according to the Saffir–Simpson scale Map key Saffir–Simpson scale Tropical depression (≤38 mph, ≤62 km/h) Tropical storm (39–73 mph, 63–118 km/h) Category 1 (74–95 mph, 119–153 km/h) Category 2 (96–110 mph, 154–177 km/h) Category 3 (111–129 mph, 178–208 km/h) Category 4 (130–156 mph, 209–251 km/h) Category 5 (≥157 mph, ≥252 km/h) Unknown Storm type Tropical cyclone Subtropical cyclone Extratropical cyclone, remnant low, tropical disturbance, or monsoon depression

Under the influence of upper-level cyclonic circulation over southern Andaman Sea, a low-pressure area formed at 00:00 UTC on 29 October 2026, as per the India Meteorological Department (IMD). It moved northwestwards, positioning itself over the Nicobar Islands by 03:00 UTC on 30 October. Early forecasts predicted the system to strengthen and approach the Indian states of Andhra Pradesh in manner similar to Cyclone Arnab, which had impacted the state on 27 October and left a trail of destruction. The United States Air Force and Navy's Joint Typhoon Warning Center (JTWC), marked the tropical disturbance as Invest 91B, observing a low-level circulation center (LLCC) with a "flaring" convection as well as weak banding in its southern and eastern periphery.

On 31 October, the disturbance emerged onto southeastern Bay of Bengal, 294 km south-west to Port Blair. Satellite imagery showed that the LLCC had rapidly consolidated with a deep, persistent convection above it, alongside formative rain bands in its northern and southern quadrants, prompting a Tropical Cyclone Formation Alert (TCFA) from the JTWC. The IMD reported the system to have concentrated into a Depression by 06:00 UTC at 300 km north-west of Car Nicobar and 1140 km south-east of Chennai, favouring cyclogenesis with a sea surface temperature of 29 °C, an active but weak phase-3 Madden–Julian oscillation, and a low vertical wind shear; it had an estimated central pressure of 1008 hPa (mbar) and maximum sustained wind speed of 46.3 km/h gusting to 64.8 km/h, (Note: IMD's wind speed calculations are based on readings taken in one-minute intervals.) and was projected to move towards southern Coastal Andhra and make landfall between Narasapuram and Nellore.

Satellite image of the depression over southern Bay of Bengal on 31 October 2026 before it strengthened into Cyclone Murasu

On 1 November, the system intensified into a Deep Depression at 00:00 UTC, about 700 km east of Chennai and 770 km south-east of Machilipatnam, and continued moving northwestwards, steered by an upper tropospheric ridge running 17°N due to an anti-cyclone over Myanmar. The JTWC recategorized it as Tropical Cyclone 04B. Six hours later, IMD confirmed that it further intensified into a cyclonic storm and named it Murasu, a name nominated by India as per tropical cyclone nomenclature. Murasu laid about 560 km east of Chennai and 630 km southeast of Nellore with wind speed of 65 to 75 km/h gusting to 85 km/h. The storm's area of intense convection tilted north-west due to wind shear, and its track favoured an eventual northwest recurvature due to the aforementioned ridge, reaffirming the landfall forecast between Narasapuram and Nellore.

By 15:00 UTC of 1 November, Murasu had moved closer to the coast of southern Andhra Pradesh, about 350 km east of Chennai and 400 km south-east of Nellore, and predicted to further intensify and make landfall near Ongole. Marine meteorologist Fred Pickhardt opined on Substack that there is a risk of rapid intensification as Murasu moves through a "highly favourable environment" and subsequently decelerates when the steering currents cease in the next 12 to 24 hours, further delaying the landfall. IMD confirmed that Murasu intensified into a severe cyclonic storm by 21:00 UTC, with satellite images showing clear spiral banding of its clouds.

Cyclone Murasu on 1 November 2026 in its northwest trajectory towards southern peninsular India, moving with speed of 20–25 km/h.

On 2 November, Murasu abruptly decelerated as it approached an evolving col consisting of two anticyclonic cells—one over central Bay of Bengal and the other over southern peninsular India—that resulted from a bifurcation of the subtropical ridge. The cyclone was located 160 km east of Nellore, 180 km north-east of Chennai, and 180 km south-east of Kavali by 03:00 UTC, with an estimated central pressure of 996 hPa and maximum sustained wind speed of 101.9 km/h gusting to 120.4 km/h. With an intensity score of T3.5, satellite analysis showed that Murasu's clouds were organised in a curved band pattern, core embedded in a central dense overcast (CDO), and low-level vorticity shifting from circular to elliptical. The vortex was characterized with deep inner-core convection and "vigorous" overshooting cloud tops over and around the elliptical, asymmetric LLCC. The IMD projected landfall at Ongole between 18:00 and 22:00 UTC of 2 November. The JTWC forecasted Murasu to stall near the coastline or make a prolonged landfall as it embeds itself between the anticyclonic cells, and that the upwelling from such stalling on the cool, shallow waters of the Coromandel Coast will suffocate the cyclone, hindering any possibility of further intensification before landfall. The IMD agreed, reporting the outer spiral bands were already interacting with land by 06:00 UTC, indicating that Murasu will not intensify further; however, Murasu is forecasted to weaken slowly after landfall, maintaining its intensity for at least 12 hours due to warm moist air intrusion from the terrain.

Murasu entered col as a Severe Cyclonic Storm by 09:00 UTC of 2 November, 100 km east of Nellore. As predicted, it made landfall between Ongole of Prakasam district and Chirala of Bapatla district (latitude 15.3°N and longitude 80.3°E) from 19:30 UTC of 2 November to 00:00 UTC of 3 November, crossing the coastline closest to the village of Chinaganjam; wind speed was 100 to 110 km/h gusting to 120 km/h, and its elliptical eye's diameter was 40 km along the major axis and 30 km along the minor axis. However, just prior to initiating landfall, Murasu achieved a new peak in intensity equivalent to Category-2 on the Saffir-Simpson hurricane wind scale (SSHWS), and crossed-over to land as a "highly compact cyclone".

The remants of Murasu weakening over southeastern Indian terrain on 4 November 2026

The system rapidly declined inland. By 09:00 UTC of 3 November, Murasu lost intensity and degraded into a Cyclonic Storm over southern Andhra Pradesh (40 km north-west of Bapatla and 60 km north of Ongole), after which it assumed a slow northward track towards south-eastern Telangana. It weakened into a Deep Depression by 15:00 UTC, and within the next nine hours, further weakened into a Depression 30 km south of Khammam. It began dissipating as a low-pressure area last monitored over eastern Telangana at 03:00 of 5 November.

== Preparations and impact ==
=== Andhra Pradesh ===
Andhra Pradesh had barely begun healing from Arnab when it received alerts about the next cyclone, Murasu. The IMD issued storm surge warnings to southern Coastal Andhra, especially the low-lying areas of Bapatla, Prakasam, Nellore, Guntur, and Krishna districts. The Chief Minister of Andhra Pradesh directed officials to ensure adequate manpower and equipment ready for relief and rescue operations and proactively shift necessary personnel and materials to high-risk areas, highlighting the damages from Cyclone Arnab. Beside Andhra's own 11 teams from the 10 Battalion of the National Disaster Response Force (NDRF), three additional teams were dispatched from the 4th Battalion stationed at Nagarikuppam near Arakkonam, Tamil Nadu, for carrying out rescue and relief operations in Andhra Pradesh. The Indian Navy also assisted by providing their helicopter sorties.

Murasu made landfall between Andhra Pradesh's Bapatla and Prakasam districts, which form the northernmost edge of the Coromandel Coast.

30,000 people were evacuated from Murasu's projected path. Fishermen of Andhra Pradesh, who were still recovering from Arnab and have stayed off the sea since before its impact, were advised to remain docked till 4 November due to Murasu. The IMD has issued the red alert (extremely heavy rainfall warning) for 2 November in five districts, namely Krishna, Guntur, Bapatla, Prakasam, Markapuram and Nellore as the extremely heavy downpour was most likely to disrupt normal life in the districts. It issued an orange alert (heavy-to-very-heavy rainfall) for the same day in seven districts—East Godavari, West Godavari, Eluru, NTR, Palnadu, Tirupati and Chittoor, and yellow warning (heavy rainfall) to Alluri, Kakinada, Konaseema, Nandyal, Kadapa and Annamayya districts. For 3 November, when the cyclone begins weakening, IMD issued a red alert for in Alluri, Eluru, and NTR districts, and orange alert for Chittoor, Annamayya, Tirupati, Nellore, Prakasam, Palnadu, and Vizianagaram districts. Palnadu district magistrate declared schools and colleges shut on 2 November in the district in view of the alerts. Nellore district magistrate created a 24-hour control room to address emergencies. Mass transport between Chennai, Vijayawada, Visakhapatnam and Tirupati via Andhra Pradesh and its airspace was halted. IndiGo and Air India cancelled 19 flights scheduled to operate on 1 November across Andhra Pradesh. The South Central Railway announced 35 trains cancelled, 14 were diverted, and eight rescheduled.

Considering Arnab's destruction of power grids, the Special Chief Secretary of Energy directed power utilities to take foolproof precautionary measures to safeguard electricity infrastructure and remain fully prepared to undertake restoration works on an emergency basis. He instructed the department to maintain adequate stocks of poles, conductors, and transformers, as well as strategically positioning sufficient manpower, vehicles, and machinery in vulnerable areas. The state's health authorities formed 1,688 medical teams and arranged 116 relief centres with requisite medicine,13,165 emergency beds, and 1,454 ambulances in preparation for Murasu's impact. Emergency medicines were restocked in all the pharmacies as well as the 121 primary and urban health centres along the coast. Of the 6,870 pregnant women who are expecting delivery between November 1 and 10, 493 were proactively shifted to the nearby health centres for safe delivery.

Kakinada, Konaseema, East Godavari, Eluru and West Godavari districts received abundant and continuous rainfall. By November 2, the rainfall figures were 529.8mm in East Godavari, 421.4 mm in Kakinada and 73.6mm in Eluru. This rainfall has damaged crops that some farmers had been trying to save after draining stagnant water from their fields. The rains also caused electricity poles to fall, leaving several villages with power shutdown, particularly in Konaseema, Guntur, Kakinada and the Godavari districts. Konaseema district magistrate directed irrigation officials to clear trees, branches, silt and other debris from the district's main canals and drains. Strong gale winds and heavy rainfall battered the Kothapatnam Beach near Ongole, close to where Murasu made landfall. The harsh winds and rainfall brought counting of votes in the 2026 Andhra Pradesh urban bodies elections to a halt in some places; the Andhra Pradesh State Election Commission rescheduled the counting in the worst-hit Prakasam and Bapatla districts, which included the Ongole Municipal Corporation, as well as the Chimakurthy, Addanki, Darsi, Repalle and Chirala municipalities.

Initial estimates on 3 November reported 52,459 hectares of crops across 15 districts have been damaged by Murasu, mainly in Krishna, Bapatla, Guntur, Palnadu, and Nandyal districts, with paddy, cotton and maize bearing the brunt. About 31,000 electric poles, 200 cellular towers, and 312 houses collapsed, with power supply was disrupted in 4,095 villages. 12,230 peple were moved to relief centers as of 3 November. Two fatalities from collapsed homes were reported: a 25-year-old man in Chinaganjam, and a 65-year-old woman in Karamchedu. Palnadu, Guntur and East Godavari districts experienced widespread flooding from swollen rivers and streams. Two other deaths were reported in Guntur district; a 30-year-old man of Korrapadu village accidentally fell into floodwaters and died, and a 50-year-old woman in the hilly area of Vadderapalem in Penumaka, Tadepalli, died trapped in the debris of a tin-roofed shed crushed by a landslide. Four other people—three more in Guntur district and one in Palnadu—were confirmed dead, according to official reports.

The total economic loss Andhra Pradesh from Murasu was estimated to be ₹344 crores (US$36.3 million) in a report published on 3 November. Three days later, the Government of Andhra Pradesh stated that an estimated ₹1918.55 crores (US$203.1 million) was the economic damage left by Murasu in an official assessment; the cyclone damaged crops over 149,871 hectares of agricultural farmlands and horticultural plantations, affecting 198,649 farmers, and damaged a total of 983 houses, 346 boats and 220 fishing nets. The Roads and Buildings (R&B) Department reported damage to 760.10 kilometres of major district roads and state highways. Konaseema w

=== Tamil Nadu ===
Murasu inching towards southern India on 1 November 2026 with its outer fringes grazing north-eastern Tamil Nadu

Considering Murasu is tracking closer to Tamil Nadu unlike Arnab, the state prepared for possible direct impact. Bulletins from the IMD's Regional Meteorological Center in Chennai, the state capital, sent out heavy-to-very-heavy rainfall alerts to Chennai, Tiruvallur, Kanchipuram, Chengalpattu, and Ranipet districts. The Government of Tamil Nadu directed the district administrations to strengthen preparedness. The Commissionerate of Revenue Administration and Disaster Management directed district magistrates to follow disaster management protocols, mobilise district machinery, and promptly report untoward incidents. Residents of the aforementioned districts were advised to avoid beaches and coastal roads, waterlogged subways, and fallen power lines.

District magistrates of Chennai and Tiruvallur—the two northernmost districts of Tamil Nadu—proactively declared schools and colleges closed in their districts on 2 November. Chennai's Ennore, Madhavaram, Nungambakkam and Nandanam neighbourhoods recorded 39 mm, 21 mm, 20.4 mm, and 13.5 mm rainfall by 22:30 IST (05:00 UTC) on 1 November itself. Many parts of Chennai, Chengalpattu and Tiruvallur districts received torrential rains since that night to early 2 November. Cuddalore district shut schools down on 3 November.

The Greater Chennai Police promulgated warnings about approaching the city's shoreline as the entire northern coast of Tamil Nadu witnessed strong winds, high waves and rough seas. The Greater Chennai Corporation prepared 215 relief centres stocked with food, emergency supplies and medical facilities to accommodate residents if evacuation becomes necessary. Twelve trees were uprooted in Chennai during Murasu's impact, damaging two houses, more than 10 cars and three two-wheelers.

Fisherman were instructed to not venture into the sea until 4 November, with forecasts for the Coromandel Coast expecting winds to reach 60 to 80 km/h on 1 and 2 November and the sea expected to remain "very rough" as waves reach four to six metres in height, reducing visibility until 3 November. Those already fishing in deep waters have been asked to return immediately to the harbour or the coast. However, nine fishermen who departed from the Kasimedu Fishing Harbour, Chennai, on 29 October disappeared after their mechanised boat lost contact on 3 November during severe weather; before losing contact, the crew had reported that they were unable to navigate back to the shore and decided to anchor. Seven of them were found dead, as of 6 November.

=== Telangana ===
Telangana is located directly beside much of Coastal Andhra, and as such, is vulnerable to any extreme weather resulting from the remnants of tropical storm that make landfall in Andhra Pradesh. On 1 November, the IMD issued heavy-to-very-heavy rainfall (orange) alerts to its districts that border Andhra—Khammam, Nalgonda, Suryapet, Mahabubnagar, Nagarkurnool and Wanaparthy; and heavy rainfall (yellow) alert to Jangaon, Yadadri Bhuvanagiri, Rangareddy, Hyderabad and Medchal-Malkajgiri districts for 2 November. The next day, Nalgonda and Nagarkurnool districts were upgraded to red alerts, indicating extremely heavy rainfall and sending those districts into high alert. The rain forecast in the aforementioned districts of Telangana concerned the state's farmers whose paddy and cotton crops were in various stages of cultivation. Officials from the Telangana Department of Agriculture said that they have dispensed resources like tarpaulin sheets to protect the harvested grains.

The National Highway 221 of India

On 4 November, following the northward movement of Murasu's remnants towards eastern Telangana, red alert was lifted from Nalgona and Nagarkurnool, and issued to Suryapet, Khammam and Bhadradri Kothagudem districts. Orange alert was newly issued to Mahabubabad district. Until 12:00 IST (06:30 UTC), the highest rainfall of 25.5 mm was recorded in Madhira, followed by 22.8 mm in Sathupalli and 20 mm in Vemsoor, all in Khammam district. However, heavy rainfall lashed overnight of November 3, after which, the highest was 235 mm in Mulikipalli of Bhadradri Kothagudem, followed by 204.7 mm in Vemsoor. The rains, accompanied by strong wings, damaged standing crops like paddy, cotton, and chilli while dampening harvested produce in many mandals. Coal production in the opencast mines of the state enterprise Singareni Collieries Company Limited (SCCL) at Kothagudem, Sathupalli, and Manuguru was affected. Vehicular movement in Mulakalapalli–Dammapeta National Highway 221 came to a standstill after the road was washed away in the Pamuleru rivulet, whose heavy inflows also flooded the causeway at Anjanapuram on the Madaram–Sathupalli road, disrupting movement. The temporary ring bund of the Peddavagu medium irrigation project in Aswaraopeta suffered a breach, resulting in the inundation of agricultural fields in nearby villages. Ponds and streams across the mandal swelled following overnight heavy downpour, causing waterlogging in nearby low-lying areas.

According to preliminary estimates, Murasu's downpour damaged 4,047 hectares of crops in Bhadradri Kothagudem district and 33,589 hectares of crops in Khammam district, consisting of paddy, cotton, black gram, and chilli.

=== Odisha ===
Odisha did not suffer significant damage from Murasu. Nevertheless, the state went into high alert as it was adversely affected by Arnab. 150 landslide-prone locations were identified and plans to evacuate people from hilly and coastal low-lying areas by 2 November were set in motion. Although Murasu is not projected to make a direct landfall in Odisha, widespread rainfall and thunderstorms in the state, especially southern Odisha, as the cyclone moves towards the south Andhra Pradesh coast is highly favourable. The IMD forecast rainfall of 7–20cm in the districts of Ganjam, Gajapati, Koraput, Rayagada, and Malkangiri on 2 and 3 November, alongside winds reaching 50–60km/h, gusting to 70km/h, on November 3. The NDRF and the Odisha Disaster Rapid Action Force (ODRAF) were kept on standby in vulnerable areas, while fishermen were advised to abstain from venturing into the sea from 2 to 4 November. The heavy rainfall alert was later extended to Puri, Kandhamal and Kalahandi districts as well. Around 1,60,000 people were evacuated from the state's high-risk areas.

=== Elsewhere ===
IMD issued rainfall alerts to Chhattisgarh, Kerala, Puducherry and southern Karnataka.

== Aftermath ==
=== Relief and restoration ===
In Andhra Pradesh, 14,810 food packets were distributed to those affected by Murasu. Eleven NDRF and 13 State Disaster Response Force (SDRF) teams were deployed for relief operations, along with the arrangement of 613 generators. The Andhra Pradesh State Disaster Response and Fire Services Department deployed 185 teams to clear uprooted trees and stranded water. The South Coast Railway reported that "restoration teams are working round the clock to normalize operations", including rectifying the Vijayawada–Gudur railway line that was impacted by Murasu.

The Prakasam Barrage of Andhra Pradesh on a normal day

The Government of Andhra Pradesh released ₹37 crore (US$39.17 million) to the affected districts for immediate relief and assistance. It reported that the restoration of the power supply, under the APCPDCL jurisdiction, fixed 871 of the 1,103 affected 11 kV feeders as of 5 November, and of the 3,946 damaged 11 kV electricity poles, 1,493 have been restored. As of 5 November, 30,518 of the 31,428 telecom towers across the state had resumed operations, restoring 97.1 percent of telecommunication services. All 336 identified drainage blockages were cleared. At the Prakasam Barrage, inflow and outflow were maintained at 43,500 cusecs, with 60 of the 70 gates kept open.

The Government of India dispatched a seven-member team led by the Joint Secretary of the union Ministry of Home Affairs, Chittaranjan Das, which completed field inspections across Bapatla, Palnadu, Eluru and East Godavari districts, where nearly 60 locations were examined in two groups, assessing damage to crops, roads, drainage systems, houses, irrigation infrastructure, and fishing equipment. The teams interacted with farmers at Surappagudem in Eluru's Bhimadole mandal, observed the paddy fields and drainage facilities at Ravulapalem, assessed damage to the Kommu canal and irrigation infrastructure at Kunakalamarru, and examined fishing boats at Chirala and houses and horticultural crops at Boppudi. The Chief Minister urged the team to submit its assessment report within 10 days.

In Tamil Nadu, the Greater Chennai Corporation installed pumps to bail out waterlogging from in North Chennai areas such as Alapakkam, Valasaravakkam, Purasawalkam, Tiruvottiyur, Royapuram, and Manali.

=== Search and rescue operations ===
In Andhra Pradesh, 22 daily-wage workers from Reddy Ganapavaram and Kanakapuram villages of Eluru district were rescued by the NDRF from the Peddagavu rivulet in spate, which had washed a bridge leaving the group trapped. Seven fishermen who had set out for a fishing trip from Juvvaladinne Fishing Harbour were also rescued by officials when their engines broke down while they attempted to return ashore after noticing change in weather. Surveillance personnel on duty at the harbour had spotted their boats stranded and immediately alerted the relevant authorities.

In Telangana's Khammam district, on 4 November, a rescue operation team of 11 personnel from of the State Disaster Response Force (SDRF) and Fire Services attempted to reach eight fishermen trapped by rising waters in the Bethupalli rivulet after rainfall associated with Murasu. However, the rescue team's boats capsized in the overflowing rivulet, leaving all 11 of them missing. The SDRF launched a search operation using other boats to trace the missing personnel. The NDRF was also summoned from Bhadrachalam to intensify the rescue efforts and retrieve those stranded in the lake. After being stranded for 10 hours, all 11 personnel and eight fishermen were rescued.

==== Kasimedu fishermen tragedy ====
Fishing trawlers docked at Kasimedu FIshing Harbour, Royapuram, Chennai, Tamil Nadu (January 2026)

Out of the nine fishermen who went missing on the Bay of Bengal off of Chennai's Kasimedu Fishing Harbour during Murasu's impact, four were found dead on 5 November 2026. Prakasam district magistrate said that the fishermen, who had set out in a trawler named Sri Sengalamman, had anchored it at Nizampatnam Port. Four corpses of the fishermen were recovered after their trawler capsized in the process and efforts continued to find the other three. The trawler had suffered an engine failure. Of the four bodies recovered, three washed ashore at Kothapatnam, while another was retrieved during search operations.

The Chief Minister of Tamil Nadu condoled their deaths and announced compensation of ₹7 lakhs (US$7461.6) to each of the bereaved families, who alleged that they had alerted the authorities about the fishermen going missing, but no effective action was taken to trace them. The Leader of the Opposition critcized the government's lethargic response and demanded the families be compensated higher than ₹7 lakhs, which was also echoed by the bereaved families and some labour associations. On 6 November, the Indian Coast Guard launched a "massive" search operation find the five others, and recovered three more corpses.

The Tamil Nadu Fishermen Welfare Association demanded that a government committee comprising experienced fishermen to be instituted to improve safety measures. He claimed that "If there is a disaster on land, the government has precautionary measures in place. But when something happens at sea, there is none." On 7 November, the Tamil Nadu Department of Fisheries and Fishermen Welfare stated that the initial compensation had already been credited to the bereaved families, and that allegations of safety lapses would also be investigated. The Fishing Harbour Police said that they have charged Selva Azhagan, the owner of the boats, with negligence; Selva Azhagan had obtained anticipatory bail from the Madras High Court, the apex court of Tamil Nadu and Puducherry. On 9 November, the bodies of the remaining two fishermen were recovered off of Lakshmipuram beach near Kothapatnam.

The Indian Coast Guard is the primary maritime law enforcement and search and rescue agency of India's territorial waters and exclusive economic zone, playing an active role in cyclone preparedness.

In a press release, the Indian Coast Guard attributed the incident to the fishermen's disregard for weather forecast and warnings of the approach of Cyclone Murasu; they explained that, despite weather warnings, the fishing crew left to Kasimedu on Sri Sengalamman from Nizampatnam on the night of 2 November, as Murasu was crossing the coast, and that the crew could have "mistaken a temporary lull in winds for the storm having passed." Around noon of 3 November, the Coast Guard received the first report of the trawler getting caught in the storm, a within two hours, a search aircraft from Chennai and a ship stationed at Krishnapatnam was deployed the same day to rescue the crew; "coordinated aerial and maritime searches were conducted" from 3 to 5 November, and the submerged green-hulled Sri Sengalamman, was recovered off the Andhra coast around on 5 November.

The New Indian Express alleged "a possible breakdown in inter-state coordination" and stated that a senior Prakasam district official told the newspaper that "the Tamil Nadu fisheries department had not informed Andhra Pradesh authorities about the presence of Tamil Nadu fishing boats out of Nizampatnam harbour. Had such information been shared, officials could have tracked the vessels, alerted the fishermen and advised them to move to safer locations." A Tamil Nadu fisheries department official told the newspaper that the absence of ISRO's navigation transponder of ISRO in Sri Sengalamman was "a huge handicap in knowing the exact location of the boat" and promised to inspect all the vessels henceforth to ensure transponders are "periodically maintained and operational."

=== Reception ===
Cyclone Arnab, Murasu's immediate predecessor, also struck the Andhra Pradesh coast.

Indian mainstream media outlets referred to Murasu and Arnab as "twin cyclones", owing to their sequential formation and landfall in Andhra Pradesh. The onslaught of Murasu severely aggravated the situation and compounded losses from Arnab. The twin cyclones affected all the major agricultural districts of Andhra Pradesh, at a time paddy harvesting was scheduled to begin and the prolonged exposure to waterlogging deteroriating the grain quality and shelf-life. Farmers raised concerned that the twin cyclone-related damaged of Coastal Andhra, alongside the drought-like crop failure in Rayalaseema, could lead to some of the lowest crop yields in Andhra Pradesh history. Traders stated that lower paddy yields could drive up demand and price, which is already seen with okra, cauliflower and green chillis in the state. Arnab decimated 30.05 percent of total cultivated agriculture, followed by Murasu, which impacted another 23.71 percent, leading to the destruction of over 50 percent of Andhra Pradesh's agricultural farms within six days—a net production loss of 1,316,393 tonnes. Konaseema district, which was within the impact zone of both cyclones, lost a total of 99.19 percent of its cultivated areas.

The Deccan Herald reported that the consecutive and instant progression of Murasu after Arnab sparked intense debate among meteorologists over whether global warming or temporary atmospheric changes are driving serial cyclonic activity in the Bay of Bengal. According to The Statesman, two named-cyclones striking the same stretch of coastal Andhra Pradesh in less than a week were considered a rare occurrence before Arnab and Murasu, raising concerns over the impact of climate change; cyclones Helen and Lehar had also made successive landfalls in Andhra Pradesh in 2013. Author Vibha Sharma stated that back-to-back cyclones have a risk of compouding disaster, explaining that "Arnab dumped enormous amounts of rain, saturating the soil and filling rivers, lakes and drainage systems. When Murasu arrived just six days later, the ground had little capacity to absorb additional rainfall, a reason why even with comparatively lower wind speeds, it triggered flooding."

According to Dr. Sandeep Pattnaik, associate professor at the School of Earth, Ocean, and Climate Sciences in IIT Bhubaneswar, the claim that climate change encouraging back-to-back cyclones is unfounded, however, the heavy rainfall associated with these cyclones is a direct result of global warming and warmer seas, which increases the rain-bearing capacity of each cyclone. He explained that sequential appearance of cyclones cannot be directly attributed to climate change or the global climate phenomenon El Niño, saying further research is required to understand the underlying factors at play with respect to Bay of Bengal's anomalous atmospheric conditions and its relation to cyclones' rapid intensification near the Indian coast rather than deep sea. PK Joshi, professor in the School of Environmental Sciences of Jawaharlal Nehru University, opined in Telangana Today that the twin cyclones highlighted the need for "better forecasting, climate-resilient infrastructure and stronger community preparedness, with recovery plans accounting for successive disasters, not just individual storms." He appreciated the IMD's ground-based data and forecast but emphasized the requirement of a "Cyclone Sequence Early Warning System (EWS)".

On 6 November, the IMD reported that, following a brief period of calmness after Murasu—lacking tropical disturbances for a week, conditions on 11 November 2026 will again be favourable for an upper-level cyclonic circulation over south-east Bay of Bengal. Forecasts from global models suggested that tropical disturbances could start forming around 14 November, keeping southern peninsular India on alert. Subsequently, Cyclone Akvan emerged on 16 November and was forecasted to strike the east coast of India yet again.

== See also ==
- Tropical cyclones in 2026
- Weather of 2026
- Cyclone Akvan
