= 2026 North Indian Ocean cyclone season =

Annual cycle of tropical cyclone formation

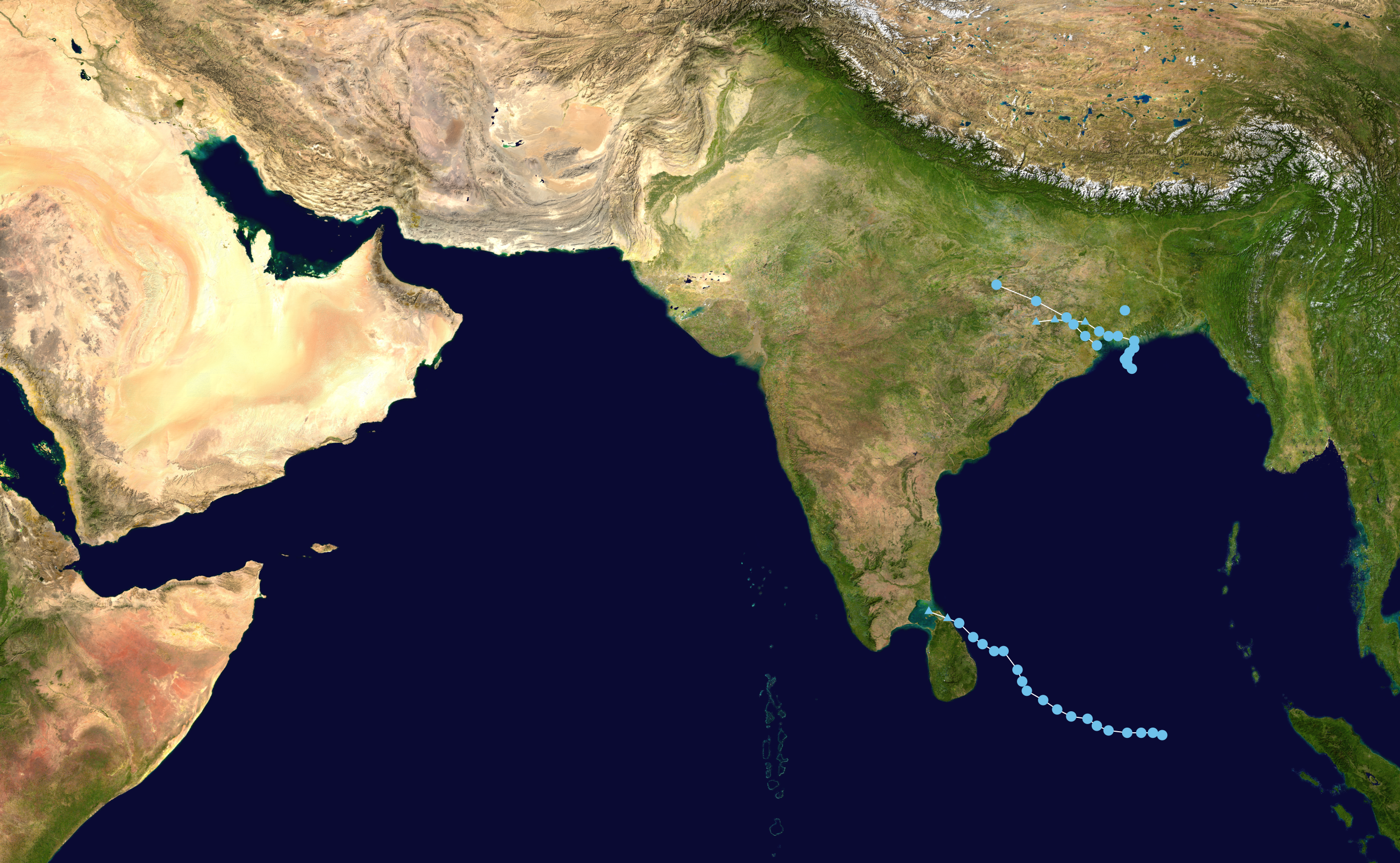
- Season summary map

Seasonal boundaries
- First system formed: 7 January 2026
- Last system dissipated: Season ongoing

Strongest storm
- Name: Arnab
  - Maximum winds: 155 km/h (100 mph) (3-minute sustained)
  - Lowest pressure: 973 hPa (mbar)

Seasonal statistics
- Depressions: 10, 1 unofficial
- Deep depressions: 6, 1 unofficial
- Cyclonic storms: 3, 1 unofficial
- Severe cyclonic storms: 3
- Very severe cyclonic storms: 1
- Total fatalities: 220 total
- Total damage: > $753.1 million (2026 USD)

Related articles
- 2026 Atlantic hurricane season; 2026 Pacific hurricane season; 2026 Pacific typhoon season

The 2026 North Indian Ocean cyclone season is an ongoing annual cycle of tropical cyclone formation in the North Indian Ocean basin. It is the first season since the 2023 season to have at least one very severe cyclonic storm, Arnab, which is also one of the latest first named cyclonic storms of any season in the basin. The season has no official bounds, but most cyclones tend to form between April and December, with the peak from May to November. These dates conventionally delimit the period of each year when most tropical cyclones form in the northern Indian Ocean.

The scope of this article is limited to the Indian Ocean in the Northern Hemisphere, east of the Horn of Africa and west of the Malay Peninsula. There are two main seas in the North Indian Ocean: the Arabian Sea to the west of the Indian subcontinent, abbreviated ARB by the India Meteorological Department (IMD); and the Bay of Bengal to the east as BOB. The systems that form over land are abbreviated as LAND. The official Regional Specialized Meteorological Centre in this basin is the IMD, while the Joint Typhoon Warning Center (JTWC) releases unofficial advisories. On average, three to four cyclonic storms form in this basin every season. The 2026 season saw the back-to-back cyclones, Arnab and Murasu, strike the eastern coast of South India, especially the state of Andhra Pradesh, which reported a total economic loss of over US$750,000,000.

== Season summary ==
The season began early with a rare deep depression forming in the Bay of Bengal on 7 January. The depression tracked west-northwest for several days before weakening near the Sri Lanka coast. A long hiatus in activity ensued until early July, as the monsoon entered its active phase. A depression formed in the Bay of Bengal on 5 July over Odisha and tracked inland. On 26 July, a depression formed near the West Bengal coast, bringing heavy rainfall to Odisha and killing 31. In mid-August, two short-lived depressions formed over eastern India. A month later, a depression formed over the Bay of Bengal, striking Andhra Pradesh on 24 September. As it tracked inland, it brought catastrophic flooding to Uttar Pradesh and Nepal. A few days later, another depression formed from a disturbance that had tracked from Thailand.

On 24 October, Cyclone Arnab formed over the central Bay of Bengal, becoming the first named storm of the season.After meandering for several days, it rapidly intensified before making landfall on the Andhra Pradesh coast ahead of official forecasts.

== Systems ==
=== Deep Depression BOB 01 ===
- Deep depression (IMD)
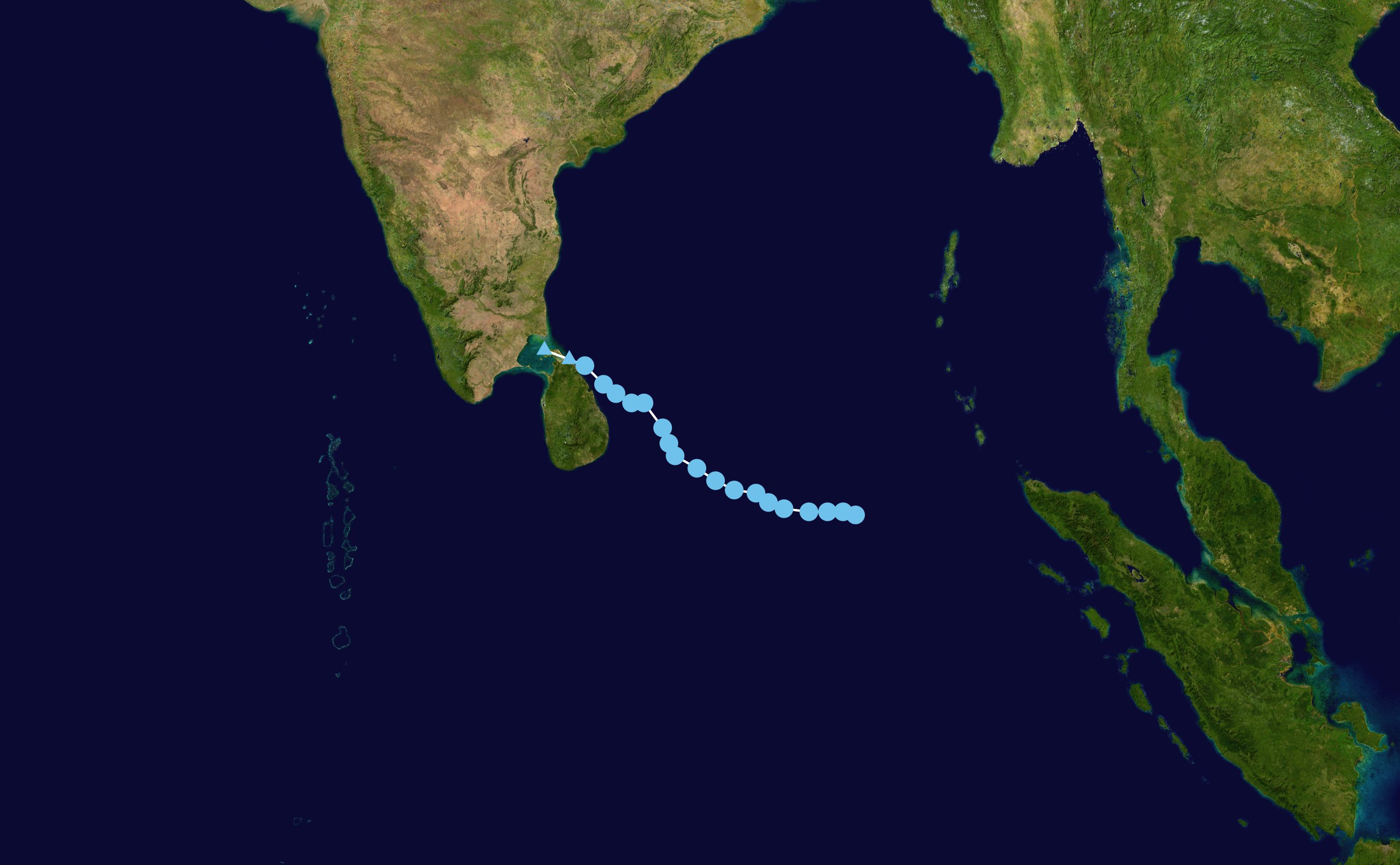
- Duration: 7 January – 10 January
- Peak intensity: 55 km/h (35 mph) (3-min); 1004 hPa (mbar)

On 7 January, a low-pressure area intensified into a depression over the Bay of Bengal. It then further intensified into a deep depression on the morning of 8 January while moving west-northwestwards. The system made landfall over Sri Lanka as a depression and crossed the country before weakening into a well marked low pressure area in the Gulf of Mannar on 10 January.

=== Depression BOB 02 ===
- Depression (IMD)
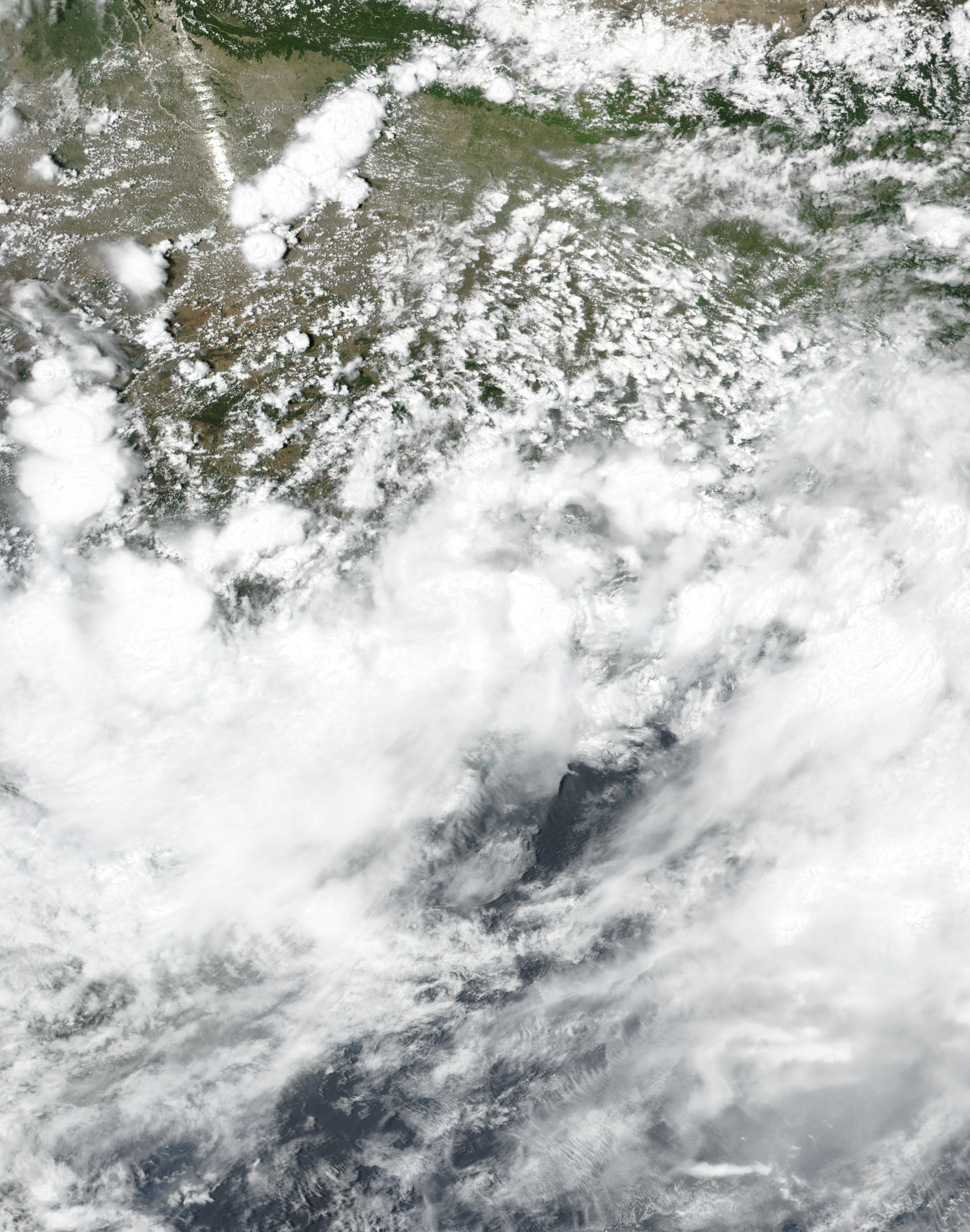
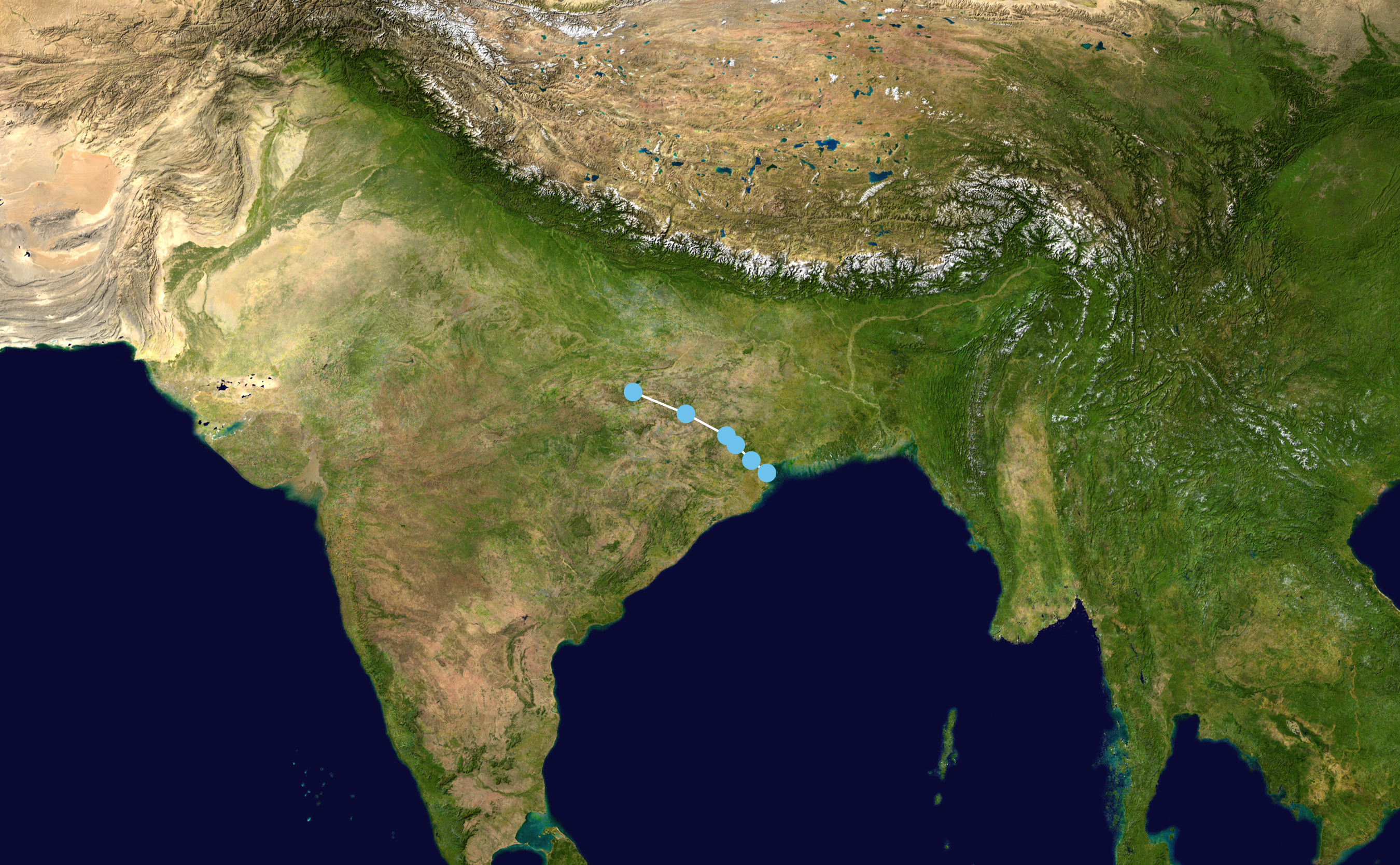
- Duration: 5 July – 7 July
- Peak intensity: 45 km/h (30 mph) (3-min); 991 hPa (mbar)

After nearly half a year of inactivity in the North Indian Ocean basin, on 5 July, the IMD classified a depression in the Bay of Bengal, labeling it as BOB 02. It was assessed with a T1.5 classification prompting maximum 3-minute sustained winds of 30 mph (45 km/h) and a minimum central pressure of 991 mbar (29.2 inHg). The depression later made landfall over northern Odisha at 09:00 UTC. After making landfall, the depression remained stationary over north Chhattisghar throughout 6 July. It later degenerated into a well marked low pressure area over east Madhya Pradesh the next day.

=== Deep Depression BOB 03 ===
- Deep depression (IMD)
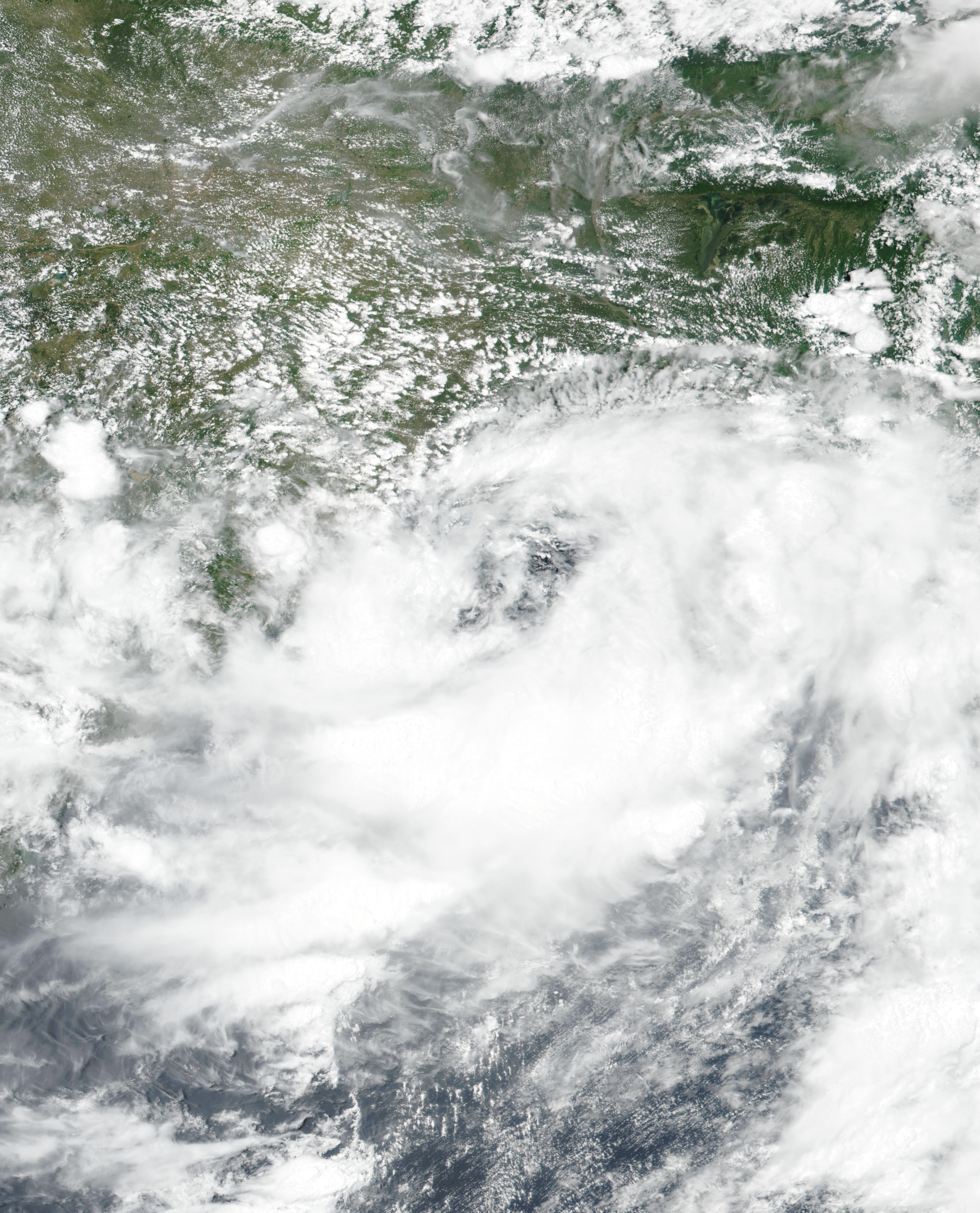
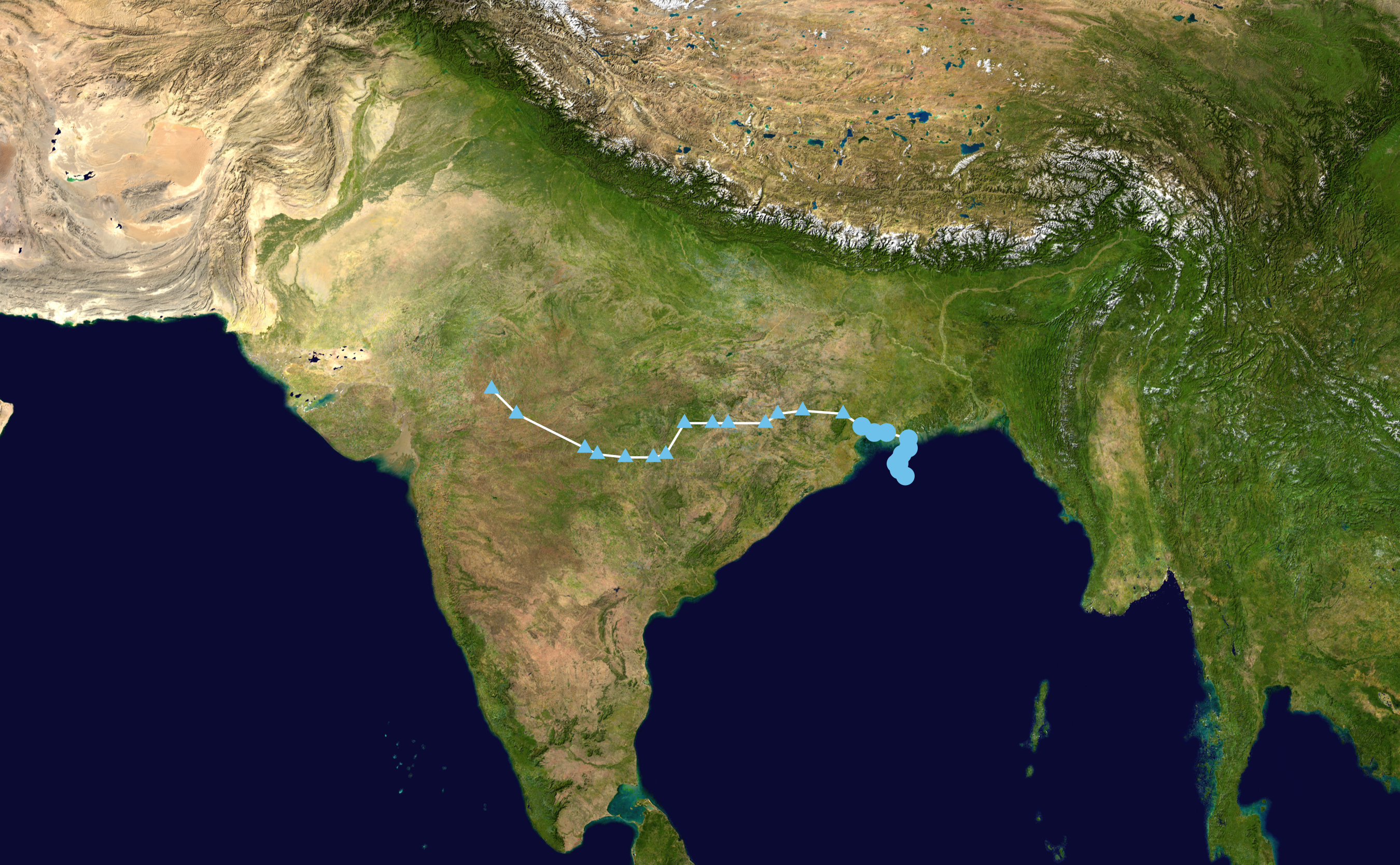
- Duration: 26 July – 1 August
- Peak intensity: 55 km/h (35 mph) (3-min); 989 hPa (mbar)

On 26 July, a depression formed over the northwest Bay of Bengal and was subsequently given the designation BOB 03 by the IMD. The JTWC promptly issued tropical weather advisories on the depression, stating that the depression consisted of a broad low-level circulation producing persistent deep convection over the southern periphery of the storm.

BOB 03 has caused heavy rainfall and flooding in Odisha, killing 8. Five of the deaths were in the Keonjhar district, including a fire service personnel member who was electrocuted. Three of the deaths occurred in the Dhenkanal, Deogarh, and Sambalpur districts. Flooding in Chhattisgarh caused at least 5 deaths. Heavy rainfall and flooding triggered a building collapse in Bhiwandi, Maharashtra, killing 10. A wall collapse killed one in Buldhana, and a lightning strike killed one in Chandrapur. Following heavy rainfall, a 70-year-old Hyderabad man was washed away after falling into an open manhole. On 31 July, heavy rain caused four deaths in Gujarat, including three who were electrocuted in Gandeva village and an 11-year-old girl swept away in a canal in Borsad Chowkdi in Anand. An 8-year-old girl died and four family members were injured when the roof of their house collapsed in Jodhpur.

=== Depression BOB 04 ===
- Depression (IMD)
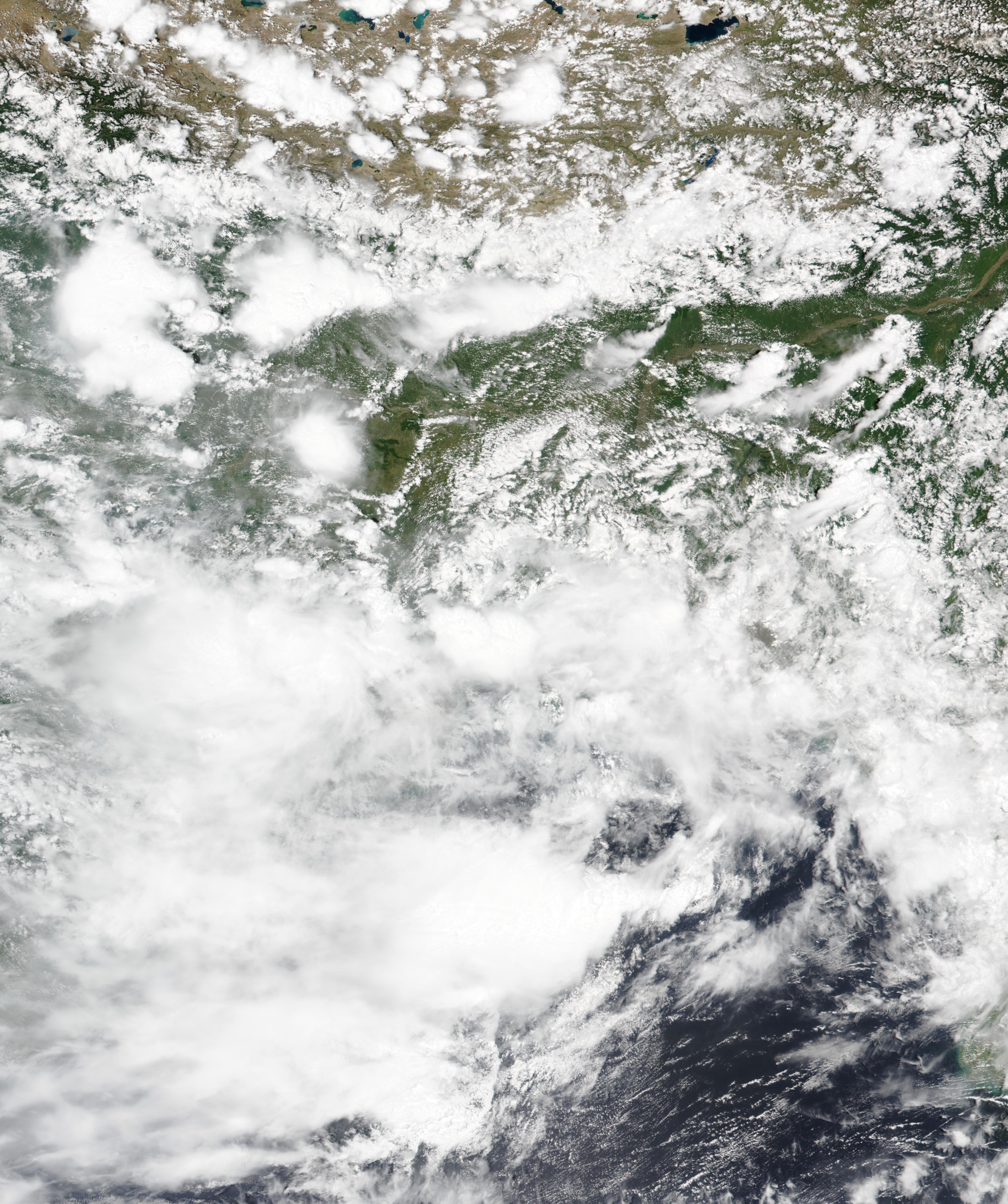
- Duration: 13 August – 14 August
- Peak intensity: 45 km/h (30 mph) (3-min); 996 hPa (mbar)

On 13 August, the IMD classified a depression southeast of Kolkata whilst inland, labeling it as BOB 04. The depression consisted of a lopsided structure with the majority of its convective organization situated to the west of the low-level circulation (LLC). BOB 04 was short-lived, degenerating into a well marked low pressure area over Jharkhand on 14 August.

=== Depression BOB 05 ===
- Depression (IMD)
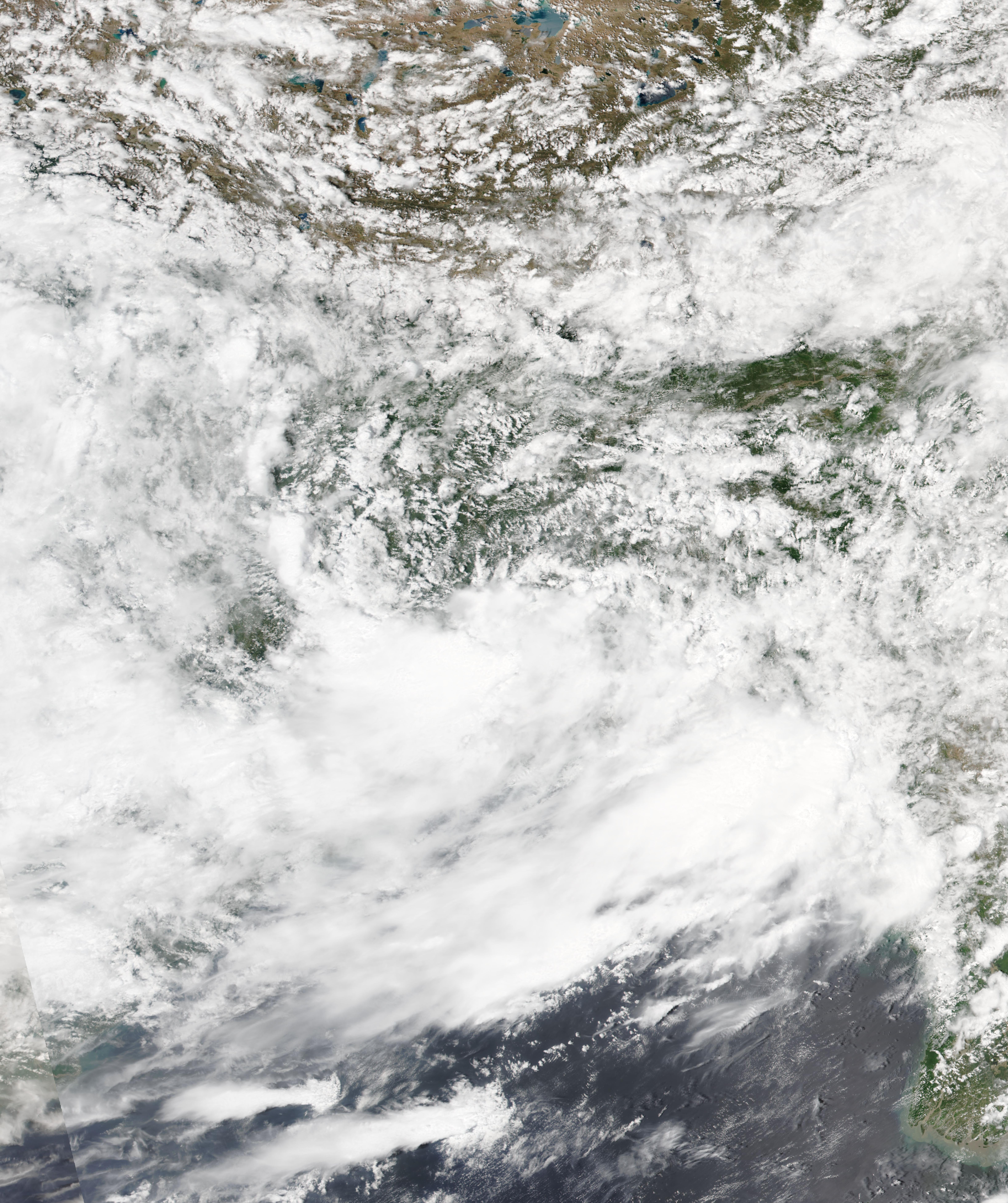
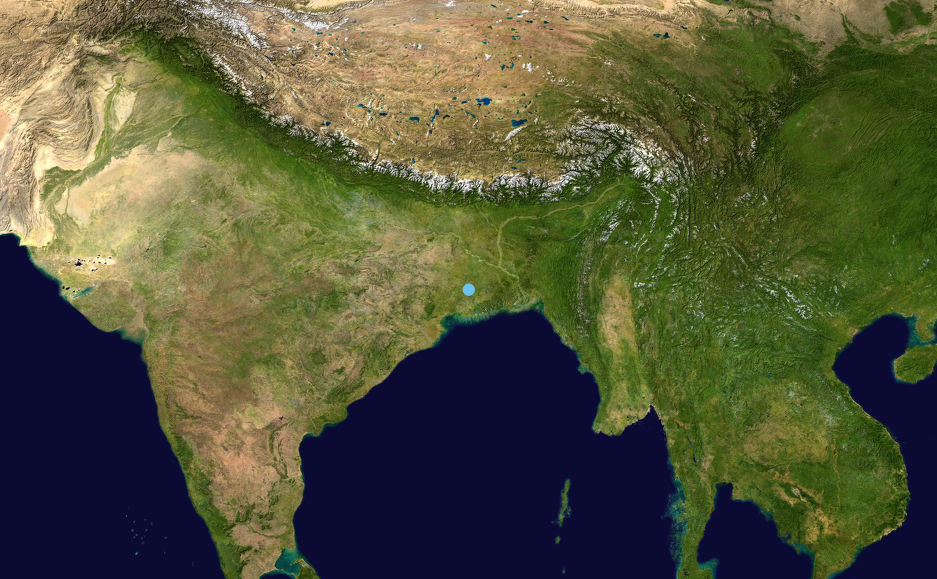
- Duration: 17 August – 19 August
- Peak intensity: 45 km/h (30 mph) (3-min); 996 hPa (mbar)

On 17 August, the IMD classified another depression, marked BOB 05 inland West Bengal. It slowly moved to the west-northwest, as the majority of its convection laid to the south and southeast of the depression’s center. BOB 05 was another short-lived depression, degenerating into a Well Marked Low Pressure Area over North Jharkhand on 19 August.

=== Deep Depression BOB 06 ===
- Deep depression (IMD)
- Tropical storm (SSHWS)
- Duration: 21 September – 27 September
- Peak intensity: 55 km/h (35 mph) (3-min); 988 hPa (mbar)

On 21 September, the IMD classified a depression over the northwest Bay of Bengal, labeling it as BOB 06. On 22 September, BOB 06 intensified into a Deep Depression over the west-central and adjoining northwest Bay of Bengal while moving west-northwestward toward the south Odisha and north Andhra Pradesh coast. The Joint Typhoon Warning Center (JTWC) followed suit, upgrading the system to a tropical storm and giving it the designation 01B.

BOB 06 caused severe flooding and torrential rainfall in Uttar Pradesh, killing at least 81 people and injuring 62 others, along with the deaths of 154 animals. Uttar Pradesh also received an average of 66.5 mm of rain in a 48-hour-period, and 2254 houses were reportedly damaged. Eight deaths were recorded in Chhattisgarh. Five were due to lightning strikes, one was from a mud house collapse, and one drowned in a flooded drain. In Odisha, intense rain triggered wall collapses and killed two people. Heavy rainfall caused nine deaths in Andhra Pradesh. Across Nepal, flooding and landslides caused 31 deaths. There was also an avalanche that killed at least four at the Himlung Himal base in Nepal. On 1 October, the death toll increased to 15 after the avalanche. On 25 and 26 September, BOB 06 caused a severe snowstorm in Burang County, Tibet, according to the Culture and Tourism Bureau of Burang County.

=== Deep Depression BOB 07 ===
- Deep depression (IMD)
- Duration: 28 September (entered basin) – 30 September
- Peak intensity: 55 km/h (35 mph) (3-min); 1002 hPa (mbar)

On 26 September the IMD began monitoring an upper level cyclonic circulation over southern Thailand and Myanmar, related to the remnants of a tropical depression that existed in the western Pacific the previous day on September 25. The following day, the IMD stated that a low pressure area developed under the influence of the upper air cyclonic circulation. Later, the JTWC issued a TCFA for the system, citing a high chance of development within 24 hours. On 28 September the IMD upgraded the well-marked low pressure area to a depression. Later that day, the IMD upgraded the system further to a deep depression. Later on, the JTWC cancelled the TCFA as the system moved inland. The following day, the IMD reported that the system weakened to a depression. On 30 September the IMD reported that the system weakened to a well-marked low pressure area.

A flood disaster emergency was declared in Bangkok following 48 hours of continuous heavy rain from the system, flooding main roads and triggering mass evacuations. Over 300 mm of rain was recorded in certain parts of Bangkok with flood waters blocking main road traffic in 37 locations. The Bangkok Metropolitan Administration (BMA) reported that it will take between 2–3 days to drain the floodwaters after the rain stops. A 58-year-old woman was killed after being electrocuted in the car park of a housing complex in Khlong Chan. Two fatalities were confirmed in Bueng Kum district: a 73-year-old man who drowned after slipping and falling while moving belongings from his house and a 78-year-old bedridden man that drowned after being unable to evacuate in the same district. Outside of Bangkok, over half a million people have been affected in 25 provinces with 8 dead as a result. Samut Prakan, just south of Bangkok, was the most severely hit. Pattaya experienced flooding, although less severe than Bangkok. On 29 September, death toll from the floods rose to 23 people, including four in Bangkok, and caused at least ฿11 billion in damages.

=== Very Severe Cyclonic Storm Arnab ===
- Very severe cyclonic storm (IMD)
- Category 4 tropical cyclone (SSHWS)
- Duration: 24 October – 29 October
- Peak intensity: 155 km/h (100 mph) (3-min); 973 hPa (mbar)

At 12:00 UTC on 24 October, a well-marked low-pressure area that had been monitored by the IMD for several days intensified into a depression over the central Bay of Bengal. Designated Invest 98B by the JTWC, the system initially featured a partially exposed but consolidating low-level circulation center (LLCC), with developing convective banding to the south and east. The JTWC subsequently issued a Tropical Cyclone Formation Alert (TCFA) at 11:00 UTC. At 09:30 UTC on 25 October, the IMD upgraded the system to a deep depression. The following day, the system further intensified into a cyclonic storm and was named Arnab. (Note: The name Arnab (Bengali: অর্ণব; [ˈɔɹnob]) was contributed by Bangladesh and means "ocean" in Bengali.)

NASA described Arnab's formation as unusually late for the basin, which typically produces named cyclones during April and May. Over the following 12 hours, the storm strengthened into a severe cyclonic storm. Six hours later, it intensified further into a very severe cyclonic storm. Arnab reached peak intensity with estimated sustained winds of 125–135 km/h (78–84 mph), with gusts of up to 150 km/h (93 mph).

Arnab made landfall along the coast of Andhra Pradesh, southwest of Yanam, near 16.450°N, 81.90°E. The landfall location was approximately 20 km east-northeast of Narasapuram, 40 km southwest of Yanam and 60 km southwest of Kakinada. The storm remained near the coast during a prolonged landfall period between 20:30 UTC on 27 October and 02:30 UTC on 28 October, before weakening into a severe cyclonic storm. Following landfall, Arnab turned sharply northward and continued moving inland. By 29 October, its remnants had weakened into a depression over Chhattisgarh and subsequently dissipated.

In Andhra Pradesh, nine fatalities were reported as a result of the cyclone, with incidents involving exposed electrical wires, fallen power poles, collapsed houses and uprooted trees. By 29 October, the storm had damaged agricultural crops across more than 325,000 hectares and affected 180 houses in the state. In Tamil Nadu, persistent rainfall associated with the weather system caused landslides in its Western Ghat areas. At least 62 minor landslides were reported in the district in a single day, damaging power lines, revetments and residential properties. In Odisha, one person was killed when a tree fell onto a house and caused a wall to collapse, and fifteen more, including an infant, were killed in a deluge-induced landslide. Nepal's Koshi, Bagmati, and Gandaki provinces faced heavy rain and snowfall from 29 to 31 October 2026 after Arnab's remnants combined with the westerlies.

=== Severe Cyclonic Storm Murasu ===
- Severe cyclonic storm (IMD)
- Category 2 tropical cyclone (SSHWS)
- Duration: 31 October – 4 November
- Peak intensity: 100 km/h (65 mph) (3-min); 986 hPa (mbar)

Under the influence of upper-level cyclonic circulation over southern Andaman Sea, a low-pressure area formed at 00:00 UTC on 29 October. It moved northwestwards over the Nicobar Islands by 03:00 UTC on 30 October. Early forecasts predicted the system to strengthen and approach Andhra Pradesh like Arnab. The JTWC marked the tropical disturbance Invest 91B. On 31 October, the disturbance entered southeastern Bay of Bengal, 294 km south-west to Port Blair, prompting a TCFA from the JTWC. IMD reported the system to have concentrated into a depression by 06:00 UTC at 300 km north-west of Car Nicobar and 1140 km south-east of Chennai, favouring cyclogenesis; it was projected to move towards southern Coastal Andhra and make landfall between Narasapuram and Nellore.

On 1 November, the system intensified into a deep depression at 00:00 UTC, about 700 km east of Chennai and 770 km south-east of Machilipatnam, and continued moving northwestwards. The JTWC recategorized it as Tropical Cyclone 04B. Six hours later, IMD confirmed that it further intesified into the cyclonic storm Murasu, (Note: The name Murasu (Tamil: முரசு; [mʊɾəsu]) was contributed by India and refers to a Tamil percussion instrument.) laid about 560 km east of Chennai and 630 km southeast of Nellore with wind speed of 65 to 75 km/h gusting to 85 km/h. By 15:00 UTC, Murasu's movement and prevailing col favoured a landfall near Ongole, and by 21:00 UTC, it had had intensified into a Severe Cyclonic Storm.

Murasu abruptly decelerated on 2 November as it approached the col. Nevertheless, it achieved a new peak in intensity equivalent to Category-2 on the Saffir-Simpson hurricane wind scale (SSHWS), and crossed-over to land as a "highly compact cyclone". It made landfall between Ongole and Chirala (latitude 15.3°N and longitude 80.3°E) from 19:30 UTC of 2 November to 00:00 UTC of 3 November, and featured an elliptical eye. After landfall, Murasu underwent rapidly degeneration, assuming a northward track, and weakened into a Depression 30 km south of Khammam by 00:00 UTC of 4 November. After six hours, the remnants further degenerated into a low pressure area over south-eastern Telangana, beginning dissipation.

Striking again within five days after Arnab, Andhra Pradesh had barely recovered when it received alerts on Murasu. 30,000 people were evacuated from Murasu's projected path in the state. The cyclone brought heavy rainfall across southern and central parts of the state. 983 houses collapsed, eight people died, and 149,871 hectares of crops, 31,000 electric poles, and 31,428 telecommunication towers were damaged, as well as power outage in 4,095 villages. Andhra Pradeh's total economic loss was estimated to be ₹1918.55 crores (US$203.1 million). Results of the state's 2026 urban bodies elections were withheld in affected areas. In Chennai, Tamil Nadu, nine fishermen died after their trawler capsized, and twelve trees were uprooted, damaging two houses and over 13 vehicles. In Telangana, Murasu damaged agricultural farms, produce, SCCL mines, and various roads, including the National Highway 221.

=== Severe Cyclonic Storm Akvan ===
- Severe cyclonic storm (IMD)
- Tropical storm (SSHWS)
- Duration: 15 November – 20 November
- Peak intensity: 95 km/h (60 mph) (3-min); 998 hPa (mbar)

On 12 November, the IMD detected two upper-air cyclonic circulations over southern Bay of Bengal that merged and formed a low-pressure area. The JTWC designated it Invest 92B, located approximately 960 km south-east of Chennai. By 18:00 UTC, the disturbance moved north and was developing a LLCC and producing convective bursts. At 05:00 UTC of November 15, the IMD designated the system as a Depression, located about 700 km south-west of Port Blair on south-central Bay of Bengal. At 18:00 UTC, the system intensified into a Deep Depression, moving 8 km/h northwards into the central Bay of Bengal at about 640 km northwest of Trincomalee. On 16 November, the IMD marked the coastline between Nellore and Tuni as the likely landfall zone, and the JTWC issued a TCFA at 07:30 UTC as the LLCC continued to consolidate.

By 12:00 UTC of 16 November, the system attained a maximum sustained wind speed of 65 km/h gusting to 83 km/h, prompting the IMD to upgrade it as Cyclonic Storm Akvan. (Note: The name Akvan (Persian: اکوان; [ækˈvɒːn]) was contributed by Iran and refers to a monster from Iranian folklore that can turn into a storm.) It moved northwestwards at a speed of 10 km/h with a core pressure of 1000 hPa, laid about 610 km east of Chennai. The JTWC followed also classified the system as Tropical Cyclone 05B, highlighting its erratic motion and disorganized LLCC. For the next 24 hours, Akvan remained stationary and barely moved, restricted by a col region of two anticyclonic areas. On 18 November, Akvan intensified into a Severe Cyclonic Storm, creeping towards the coast. By 06:00 UTC of 19 November, it quickly moved northwards towards Odisha, steered by an eastern ridge, at a maximum wind speed of 90 km/h gusting to 110 km/h, laid 430 km south of Gopalpur.

Akvan made landfall between 02:00 and 06:30 UTC on 20 November, near Gopalpur, as a weakened Cyclonic Storm with a wind speed of 70-80 km/h gusting to 90 km/h, Terrain interaction rapidly degraded Akvan into a low-pressure area over central Odisha by 20:00 UTC. The cyclone caused comparatively minimal damage, with no reported fatalities. However, cultivated lands in parts of Odisha, and West Bengal, as well as Bangladesh were significantly damaged from heavy rainfall and waterlogging.

=== Other system ===
Satellite imagery (left) and track map (right) of JTWC-designated Tropical Cyclone 03B (middle of the left image) at its peak intensity over the Bay of Bengal on October 27 alongside Cyclone Arnab (left of the left image)

The JTWC monitored a tropical disturbance named Invest 90B from 26 to 28 October, and it underwent a Fujiwhara interaction with Cyclone Arnab on October 27 according to U.S. Automated Tropical Cyclone Forecasting System. The JTWC retroactively analyzed the disturbance and designated it as Tropical Cyclone 03B. However, the IMD did not monitor the system.

== Storm names ==
Within this basin, a tropical cyclone is assigned a name when it is judged to have reached cyclonic storm intensity with winds of 65 km/h (40 mph). There is no retirement of tropical cyclone names in this basin as the list of names is only scheduled to be used once before a new list of names is drawn up. Should a named tropical cyclone move into the basin from the Western Pacific, then it will retain its original name. The next eight available names from the list of North Indian Ocean storm names are below.

- Arnab
- Murasu
- Akvan
- Kaani (unused)
- Ngamann (unused)
- Sail (unused)
- Sahab (unused)
- Lulu (unused)

== Season effects ==
This is a table of all storms in the 2026 North Indian Ocean cyclone season. It mentions all of the season's storms and their names, duration, peak intensities according to the IMD storm scale, damage, and death totals. Damage and death totals include the damage and deaths caused when that storm was a precursor wave or extratropical low. All of the damage figures are in 2026 USD.

Name	Dates	Peak intensity			Areas affected	Damage (USD)	Deaths	Ref(s).
Name	Dates	Category	Wind speed	Pressure	Areas affected	Damage (USD)	Deaths	Ref(s).
BOB 01	7–10 January	Deep depression	55 km/h (35 mph)	1004 hPa (29.65 inHg)	Sri Lanka, South India	Unknown	None	
BOB 02	5–7 July	Depression	45 km/h (30 mph)	991 hPa (29.26 inHg)	East India, Bangladesh, Myanmar, Central India, North India	Unknown	None	
BOB 03	26 July–1 August	Deep depression	55 km/h (35 mph)	989 hPa (29.21 inHg)	India, Bangladesh, Myanmar, Pakistan	Unknown	31	
BOB 04	13–14 August	Depression	45 km/h (30 mph)	996 hPa (29.41 inHg)	East India, Bangladesh, Myanmar, Central India	Unknown	None	
BOB 05	17–19 August	Depression	45 km/h (30 mph)	996 hPa (29.41 inHg)	East India, Bangladesh, Myanmar, Central India, North India	Unknown	None	
BOB 06	21–27 September	Deep depression	55 km/h (35 mph)	988 hPa (29.18 inHg)	Thailand, Myanmar, Andaman and Nicobar Islands, East India, Bangladesh, South India, Central India, North India, Nepal, Tibet	Unknown	146	
BOB 07	28–30 September	Deep depression	55 km/h (35 mph)	1002 hPa (29.59 inHg)	Thailand, Myanmar, Andaman and Nicobar Islands, Bangladesh, Northeast India (after crossover)	Unknown	None	
Arnab	24–29 October	Very severe cyclonic storm	155 km/h (100 mph)	973 hPa (28.73 inHg)	Andhra Pradesh, Odisha, Chhattisgarh, Nepal	$550 million	26+	
Murasu	31 October – 4 November	Severe cyclonic storm	100 km/h (65 mph)	986 hPa (29.12 inHg)	Andhra Pradesh, Tamil Nadu, Telangana	>$203 million	17+	
Akvan	15–20 November	Severe cyclonic storm	95 km/h (60 mph)	998 hPa (29.47 inHg)	Odisha, West Bengal, Jharkhand, Bangladesh	Unknown	None	
Season aggregates
10 systems	7 January – Season ongoing		155 km/h (100 mph)	973 hPa (28.73 inHg)		>$753 million	220+	

== See also ==
- Weather of 2026
- Tropical cyclones in 2026
- 2026 Atlantic hurricane season
- 2026 Pacific hurricane season
- 2026 Pacific typhoon season
- South-West Indian Ocean cyclone seasons: 2025–26, 2026–27
- Australian region cyclone seasons: 2025–26, 2026–27
- South Pacific cyclone seasons: 2025–26, 2026–27
