= Cyclone Akvan =

North Indian Ocean cyclone in 2026

Severe Cyclonic Storm Akvan
- Akvan east of India nearing peak intensity on 18 November

Meteorological history
- Formed: 15 November 2026
- Dissipated: 20 November 2026

Severe cyclonic storm
- 3-minute sustained (IMD)
- Highest winds: 95 km/h (60 mph)
- Highest gusts: 110 km/h (70 mph)
- Lowest pressure: 998 hPa (mbar); 29.47 inHg

Tropical storm
- 1-minute sustained (SSHWS/JTWC)
- Highest winds: 75 km/h (45 mph)
- Lowest pressure: 998 hPa (mbar); 29.47 inHg

Overall effects
- Evacuated: ~372,000
- Areas affected: Odisha; Jharkhand; West Bengal; Bangladesh
- Part of the 2026 North Indian Ocean cyclone season

Severe Cyclonic Storm Akvan (Note: The name Akvan (Persian: اکوان; [ækˈvɒːn]) was contributed by Iran and refers to a storm monster from Iranian folklore.) was a weak tropical cyclone that affected East India and Bangladesh. It is the tenth depression and the third cyclone of the 2026 North Indian Ocean cyclone season after Arnab and Murasu, which formed in the Bay of Bengal in the preceding weeks and battered the eastern seaboard of India. Akvan's impact was relatively minimal, with no fatalities reported.

The system originated as a low-pressure area over the southern periphery of Bay of Bengal on 12 November 2026 and meandered its way towards the east Indian coastline, gradually developing into the Cyclonic Storm Akvan on 16 November. It faced weak steering currents in a saddle point under the influence of two subtropical ridges. During its life cycle as a cyclone, Akvan remained a highly asymmetric and poorly organized system with a displaced convection, sheared centre, exposed low-level circulation center, and a wobbling trajectory. It stalled over central Bay of Bengal on 17 November and intensified into a Severe Cyclonic Storm the next day, maintaining a slow northwestward movement towards the Indian states of Odisha and Andhra Pradesh. It made landfall on 20 November at Ganjam district as a weakened Cyclonic Storm and rapidly degraded into a low-pressure over northern Odisha the next day.

The India Meteorological Department (IMD) initially forecasted the landfall corridor of Akvan at south-central Andhra Pradesh, and after several updates successively shifting it northward due to the system's erratic motion, finalized landfall on 20 November between northern Andhra Pradesh and south-eastern Odisha, which was subsequently narrowed down to the coastline between Visakhapatnam and Puri. Heavy rainfall alerts were issued to 29 districts across southern Odisha, northern Andhra Pradesh, Jharkhand, and West Bengal.

Odisha, which was directly in the Akvan's path, evaded major losses by deploing 1,012 emergency response teams, including 60 Odisha Disaster Rapid Action Force (ODRAF) and 131 Odisha Fire Service units, before the cyclone arrived. The Indian Coast Guard and the National Disaster Response Force (NDRF) were also dispatched to high-risk areas. Schools and colleges in eight of its districts were declared closed for two to three days, fishing operations were prohibited, 69 trains were cancelled, and around 372,000 people from areas prone to heavy rainfall, landslides, storm surge and flash floods were evacuated to 9,341 cyclone shelters, supported by 2,523 relief camps. However, agricultural crops in Ganjam, Puri, Jagatsinghpur, Kendrapara, and Gajapati districts were damaged from heavy rainfall. Jharkhand and West Bengal faced widespread water-logging issues in some districts, affecting cultivations and transportation. Bangladesh reported 531 hectares of inundated crops and hindered fishing activities in its Khulna Division.

== Meteorological history ==
Map plotting the storm's track and intensity, according to the Saffir–Simpson scale Map key Saffir–Simpson scale Tropical depression (≤38 mph, ≤62 km/h) Tropical storm (39–73 mph, 63–118 km/h) Category 1 (74–95 mph, 119–153 km/h) Category 2 (96–110 mph, 154–177 km/h) Category 3 (111–129 mph, 178–208 km/h) Category 4 (130–156 mph, 209–251 km/h) Category 5 (≥157 mph, ≥252 km/h) Unknown Storm type Tropical cyclone Subtropical cyclone Extratropical cyclone, remnant low, tropical disturbance, or monsoon depression

The India Meteorological Department (IMD) reported that conditions on 13 November 2026 favoured formation of a third post-monsoon low-pressure area of the 2026 season in the Bay of Bengal. At 03:00 UTC of 12 November, two upper-air cyclonic circulations were detected, one over the south-eastern Bay of Bengal and the other over central Andaman Sea, with potential cyclogenesis by 15 November. They merged and developed into a single low-pressure area on 20 November, from where an east-west trough extended till the Maldives in the lower tropospheric levels across the south-west Bay of Bengal and absorbed a third upper-air cyclonic circulation from the Gulf of Mannar; the low was forecasted to intensify as a Cyclonic Storm and move northwestwards. The United States Air Force and Navy's Joint Typhoon Warning Center (JTWC) classified the area of convection as Invest 92B, located 8.3° N, 87.6° E, approximately 960 km south-east of Chennai. By 18:00 UTC, it developed a broad low-level circulation center (LLCC) and produced convective bursts along its southern flank, supported by a cyclogenic environment consisting of low vertical wind shear (19-28 km/h), moderate radial outflow aloft, and warm sea surface temperatures (29-30 °C).

Satellite image of Akvan as a T1.5 depression on 15 November 2026 before it strengthened into a cyclonic storm.

The disturbance became a well-marked low pressure area at 00:00 UTC of 14 November, featuring an elliptical low-level positive vorticity that stretches southeast–northwest to the south of the center, while the low-level convergence runs southwest–northeast in the southwestern sector and the upper-level divergence sat directly above the southwestern sector along a northwest–southeast axis. The estimated central barometric pressure was 1009 hPa. The IMD predicted that the system, fed by the phase-locked Madden-Julian Oscillation (MJO), the Kelvin Wave, and the Equatorial Rossby Wave, will consolidate further into a Cyclonic Storm by 17 November over central Bay of Bengal.

At 05:00 UTC of 15 November, the IMD designated the system as a Depression, located about 690 km east of Trincomalee with intensity T1.5 and intense convection in the north-west quadrant. There was divergence between various weather models and forecasters regarding the system's movement and landfall, with the initial cone of uncertainty extending from northern Tamil Nadu to south and central Andhra Pradesh, the latter of which had already been adversely affected by cyclones Arnab and Murasu this season. The IMD projected the storm to intensify into a Severe Cyclonic Storm, move northwestwards, and make landfall at Andhra Pradesh by 19 November. By 18:00 UTC of 15 November, the system achieved Deep Depression intensity, moving 8 km/h northwards into central Bay of Bengal, about 640 km northwest of Trincomalee. Global deterministic models remained split on the structural development, with some depicting the partially-exposed LLCC to remain broad and slower to intensify while others suggested a more aggressive cyclogenesis and tighter circulation, but agreed it will have a slow northward progression and a later northwestward turn.

On 16 November, the IMD disclosed the coastline between Nellore and Tuni as the likely landfall zone, and the JTWC issued a Tropical Cyclone Formation Alert (TCFA) at 07:30 UTC as the LLCC, which was covered by a flaring puff of convection, continued to consolidate with the help of vertical wind shear and strong outflow. By 12:00 UTC, the system attained a central pressure of 1000 hPa and maximum sustained wind speed of 65 km/h gusting to 83 km/h with an T2.5 intensity rating, prompting the IMD to upgrade it as a Cyclonic Storm with the name Akvan, nominated by Iran as per the cyclone nomenclature. It moved northwestwards at a speed of 10 km/h, laid near 12.2° N and 85.7° E, about 610 km east of Chennai.

Akvan stalling over central Bay of Bengal on 17 November with an exposed low-level circulation center (LLCC)

The JTWC followed suit, classifying the system as Tropical Cyclone 05B, which executed a short C-shaped northeastward curvature before resuming its generally northwestward trajectory, as it was trapped in a steering environment that caused it move erratically under the influence of two competing sub-tropical ridges: one to the east and the other to the north-west of Akvan; the LLCC also became disorganized due to dry air intrusion. The JTWC reasoned that the eastern ridge, which is very likely to expand further west as the western ridge retreats, will guide Akvan in its northwestward track. Trapped within the col region, Akvan stalled in central Bay of Bengal for the next 12 hours, remaining practically stationary and hardly moving from its location. During another 10 hours, Akvan lingered northwestwards slowly at the speed of 3 km/h. It was asymmetrical, sheared north-west extremely, and producing strong convective bursts. The LLCC was mostly exposed, with two mesovortices around the center. The IMD increased the landfall zone, saying Akvan is likely to make landfall anywhere between Nellore and Visakhapatnam.

On 18 November, Akvan intensified into a Severe Cyclonic Storm at about 580 km east of Chennai with intensity of T3.0 and maximum sustained wind speed of 100-110 km/h gusting to 120 km/h. It gradually accelerated from 7-10 km/h poleward after a reduced vertical wind shear, with the IMD updating the landfall corridor as Narasapuram and Puri. This happened due to the eastern ridge achieving dominance over Akvan. However, the LLCC became more broad and ill-defined, with flaring deep convection only in the northern semicircle, wrapped along a low-level convergence boundary displaced from the center, whereas the convection in the southern semicircle waned. The JTWC narrowed down the landfall zone, saying Akvan is likely to cross between Brahmapur and Puri. By 06:00 UTC of 19 November, Akvan moved northwards along the western periphery of the eastern ridge at a maximum track speed of 17 km/h and wind speed of 90 km/h gusting to 110 km/h, laid 430 km south of Gopalpur. By 21:00 UTC, Akvan travelled at 21 km/h towards the coast, laid about 170 km south of Gopalpur, but weakened into a Cyclonic Storm due to wind shear, land interaction, dry air intrusion, reduced upper-level divergence, and shifting MJO support.

Akvan's landfall began at 02:00 UTC and completed by 06:30 UTC on 20 November, near Gopalpur, with a wind speed of 70-80 km/h gusting to 90 km/h, Terrain interaction rapidly weakenend and degraded into a well-marked low-pressure area over central Odisha by 20:00 UTC; by 00:00 UTC of 21 November, the remnants moved onto northern interior Odisha and adjacent parts of Chhattisgarh.

== Preparations and impact ==
=== India ===
Akvan as a deep depression during its approach of the Indian eastern seaboard on 16 November with intense convection in its north-west sector

The IMD advised fishermen in the Bay of Bengal to return to the coast by November 15 and warned them against venturing out until November 20, citing rough sea conditions along India's eastern seaboard starting from November 19. Akvan marked the third cyclone to impact India in within a 30-day span. The IMD Director of Meteorology described it as "a very rare event".

==== Odisha ====
Akvan was the first November cyclone in more than three decades to make landfall in Odisha. The Government of Odisha alerted its southern and coastal districts to remain prepared to deal with any adverse weather conditions, operating a 24-hour control room in each district, while the National Disaster Response Force (NDRF), the Odisha Disaster Rapid Action Force (ODRAF), the Odisha Fire Service, the Indian Coast Guard, and other emergency personnel were kept on standby for rescue and evacuation operations. On 16 November, 74 teams consisting of both NDRF and ODRAF personnel as well as 131 Fire Service teams, were deployed and evacuations were initiated; 106 pregnant women from high-risk areas were shifted to health centers. 13 medical response and 23 veterinary response teams were also deployed. To address possible road blockages, the Odisha Forest Development Corporation deployed 100 teams.

The government shifted over 372,000 people from vulnerable areas, particularly landslide-prone hilly regions to 9,341 cyclone shelters. 2,523 relief camps were also set-up. The Special Relief Commissioner (SRC) released ₹5 crore to Ganjam district, ₹1 crore to Gajapati district, and ₹50 lakhs to Malkangiri district for the evacuations, logistical arrangements, and emergency support facilities. Six districts—Ganjam, Gajapati, Rayagada, Kandhamal, Malkangiri and Koraput—were identified as highly vulnerable to landslides. Storm surge warnings were issued in Ganjam, Khordha and Puri districts. The Rayagada district magistrate identified around 55 landslide-prone and 148 flood-prone villages for pre-emptive evacuation; 45 JCB excavators and two Hydra cranes were positioned at strategic locations to facilitate rescue operations.

The India Meteorological Department (IMD) projected landfall of Akvan at the Ganjam district of Odisha. The Government of Odisha ordered emergency preparedness and evacuations in the southern, eastern, and coastal districts of the state.

On 16 November, Puri, Ganjam, and Gajapati districts were put on an orange alert for November 19, with additionally Koraput on 20 November. However, following Akvan's revise landfall zone, Ganjam, Gajapati, and Puri, as well as Kandhamal, Jagatsinghpur, and Kendrapara were placed under red alert on November 19; Mayurbhanj and Balasore districts also received the same alert but for November 20. As a precautionary measure, district magistrates announced the closure of all schools, colleges and Anganwadi centres in Khordha and Malkangiri districts on 19 and 20 November, and in Ganjam, Gajapati, Puri, Jagatsinghpur, Kendrapara, and Kandhamal districts from 19 to 21 November. The Nandankanan Zoological Park, Bhubaneswar, was closed on November 19 and 20, the Bhitarkanika National Park closed until November 21, and the Similipal Tiger Reserve closed on November 20 and 21.

The Information and Public Relations Department of Odisha cancelled all leaves, including previously approved leaves, for government officers and employees in Khordha district, which contains the capital city Bhubaneshwar, from November 18 to 23 in view of Akvan. As a precautionary measure, the Ministry of Railways cancelled two trains between Visakhapatnam and Koraput on 20 and 21 November. Subsequently, the East Coast Railway cancelled 41 trains and rescheduled 29 others, while the South Eastern Railway cancelled at least 28 express trains, mostly those bound for or passing through Puri on 21 November.

The Department of Water Resources released water from dams over Rushikulya, Nagabali, Bahuda, and Vamsadhara rivers to prepare for impending heavy rainfall. All 30 districts have reported essential preparedness for drinking water emergencies: 7.57 lakh water bottles, 813 water tankers, 903 Syntex tanks, 417 generator sets, 789 water-loading points and 13 mobile water treatment units, as well as 1,012 response teams. The Odisha Traditional Fish Workers’ Union stated that seven low-pressure systems from July to September 2026, as well as cyclones Arnab and Murasu, have halted marine fishing in the state for a total 10 weeks, and with the upcoming system's impact, the livelihoods of fishing communities are at a grave risk. Around 80 fishermen from Kakinada took shelter in Ganjam due to rough seas.

Akvan caused comparatively minimal damage in Odisha, a cyclone-prone state, with no casualties reported. Amongst the districts, Ganjam received the highest amount of rainfall, at 114.6 mm, followed by Kendrapara (64.6 mm), Puri (61.1 mm), Jagatsinghpur (51.3 mm), Bhadrak (50.9 mm). Of the 12,294 pregnant women identified by the authorities, 4,470 were moved to hospitals and maternity homes, where 1,450 babies were born during the period. However, standing agricultural crops of paddy, green grams, black grams, and vegetables such as radish, lady's fingers, brinjal, beans and pointed gourd in Ganjam, Puri, Jagatsinghpur, Kendrapara, and Gajapati districts were damaged; the government promised early release of compensations. The then-ongoing sessions of Odisha Legislative Assembly was adjoured by the Speaker on 21 November for the next two days to dispatch the Members to their respective constituencies to facilitate mitigation.

==== Jharkhand ====
Jharkhand was forcasted to received rainfall from Aknav's remnants, therefore the IMD issued yellow alert in the districts of Lohardaga, Simdega, Gumla, Ramgarh, Ranchi, Khunti, Bokaro, Dhanbad, Seraikela Kharsawan, and West and East Singhbhum from 20 to 21 November. Later on, it was upgraded to orange alert in Dhanbad, Bokaro, Seraikela-Kharswan, and East and West Singhbhum districts. 20 flights were cancelled at the capital city Ranchi's Birsa Munda Airport on 21 November due to low visibility and unfavourable weather.

Following Akvan's impact, waterlogging and pothole-filled roads slowed traffic on stretches such as the Dobo–Kanderbera section of the National Highway 33 and around the Karandih railway level crossing, while inter-district bus movement and rural markets in Kolhan saw reduced activity. Clogged drains sent wastewater onto roads in parts of Adityapur's industrial area, alongside waterlogging in areas of Jamshedpur, Chaibasa, Chakradharpur, Noamundi, and Jagannathpur.

==== West Bengal ====
In West Bengal, yellow (moderate rainfall) alert were issued to the state's Gangetic districts: Kolkata, Howrah, North and South 24 Parganas, East and West Medinipur, Jhargram, Purulia, Bankura, East and West Bardhaman, Birbhum, Murshidabad, and Nadia, valid from 19 to 22 November. On 20 November, warnings in South 24 Parganas, West and East Medinipur, Jhargram, and Bankura were upgraded to orange alert, indicating heavy to very heavy rainfall. East Midinipur, Howrah, North and South 24 Parganas, and Nadia were additionally under flash flood risks. The Chief Minister of West Bengal directed the Kolkata Municipal Corporation to closely monitor the preparedness and ensure utilites to alleviate waterlogging and other disruptions.

Continuous rain and waterlogged fields damaged ready-to-harvest paddy and winter crops such as cauliflower, cabbage, and chilliin the southern districts, with hailstorms reported in northern districts. Flower cultivators in East Medinipur's Panskura reported heavy losses as well. Officials from the Department of Agriculture noted that excess soil moisture will delay potato sowing. Crop losses and panic-harvesting triggered early reports of rising vegetable prices in Kolkata and Howrah districts.

==== Andhra Pradesh ====
Arnab, Murasu, and Akvan marked the first time since 1987 that Andhra Pradesh was impacted by three consecutive cyclones within a month; both 1987 and 2026 are El Niño years. Following the impact of cyclones Arnab and Murasu, which already costed Andhra Pradesh around ₹7,000 crores (US$750 million), the Chief Minister of Andhra Pradesh directed the NDRF and the Andhra Pradesh State Disaster Response and Fire Services Department (SDRF) to mobilize in response to Akvan, and ordered the state electricity agencies to keep crews on standby in case of power outages. 13 NDRF and 11 SDRF teams were on standby for emergency relief operations. The Chief Executive Officer of the Andhra Pradesh Real-Time Governance Society asked the public and farmers to take necessary precautionary measures as the storm was expected to make landfall at North Andhra.

More than 108,000 voice alerts were forwarded to fishing communities inhabiting the state's 1,053 km coastline. The Department of Animal Husbandry, Dairy Development and Fisheries reported that, out of the 30,808 boats that were at sea from Andhra Pradesh on 15 November, 30,685 boats have returned ashore, with "efforts underway" to bring the remaining 173 to the coast, as well as continuous surveillance of 555 coastal fishing villages in the impact zone. The Department of Agriculture proactively announced subsidies to agricultural farms that face losses amounting to 33 percent or more. The Indian Minister of Railways directed the South Coastal Railway "to take all necessary precautionary measures, with special emphasis on passenger safety, protection of railway infrastructure, regulation of train operations and advance restoration planning". Dedicated War Rooms were activated at Divisional, Zonal and Railway Board levels for monitoring, coordinationg, and responding to any eventuality.

On 19 November, following Akvan's predicted lanfall moving away from much of Andhra Pradesh, Visakhapatnam, Anakapalle, Alluri, and Kakinada districts received orange alert from the IMD. The northern most districts of Andhra Pradesh adjoining Odisha—Srikakulam, Parvathipuram Manyam, and Vizianagaram—received red aert for 19 November alone. (Note: Intially, Akvan was projected to strike Andhra Pradesh in its central parts. On 16 November, the IMD placed the Andhra Pradesh districts of Srikakulam, Vizianagaram, Parvathipuram Manyam, Visakhapatnam, Alluri, Anakapalle, Kakinada, Konaseema, East Godavari, West Godavari, Eluru, Krishna and Bapatla under orange (heavy to very heavy rainfall) alert on 19 and 20 November. On 17 November, the IMD upgraded to red (torrential rainfall) alert in Kakinada, Konaseema, Eluru, West Godavari, East Godavari, Krishna, Bapatla, as well as the Puducherry enclave of Yanam. Much of these alerts were rescinded or downgraded following Akvan's movement away from the Andhra Pradesh coastline.) Storm surge warnings were issued to the coastal belt comprising Prakasam, Bapatla, Krishna, West Godavari, Konaseema and Kakinada districts, and later extended to Vizianagaram, Srikakulam and Visakhapatnam districts.

==== Elsewhere ====
Instead of tracking toward the closest Tamil Nadu coastline despite coming close, Akvan was projected by the IMD to bypass the state and move toward the coasts of Andhra Pradesh and Odisha. Nevertheless, the storm’s uncertain trajectory was subject to conflicting forecasts, as private and independent forecasters suggested that the storm could drift more southwards than expected when the western ridge relents and strike northern Tamil Nadu instead of Andhra Pradesh or Odisha. The Government of Tamil Nadu instructed the public and fishermen to follow only official bulletins from the IMD and the Tamil Nadu State Disaster Management Authority (TNSDMA), the latter of which issued guidelines to media outlets on covering predictions by private forecasters.

The IMD has forecast isolated heavy rainfall over south-east Bihar, West Bengal, Jharkhand, Assam and Meghalaya on 21 November and over Chhattisgarh, Nagaland, Manipur, Mizoram and Tripura on both 21 and 22 November as Akvan's remants go inland.

=== Bangladesh ===
Rainfall triggered by Akvan affected over 531 hectares of farmland in Bangladesh's Khulna Division, damaging Aman paddy, winter vegetables, seedbeds and other crops. Khulna district recorded 89mm of rainfall between November 18 and 21. Rough seas and unfavourable weather in coastal areas like Dublar Char disrupted fishing activities and dried-fish production.

== See also ==
- Tropical cyclones in 2026
- Weather of 2026
- Cyclone Arnab
- Cyclone Murasu
