= Deep Depression BOB 06 (2026) =

North Indian cyclone

- Deep Depression BOB 06 at peak intensity shortly before landfall on 23 September

Meteorological history
- Formed: 21 September 2026
- Dissipated: 27 September 2026

Deep depression
- 3-minute sustained (IMD)
- Highest winds: 55 km/h (35 mph)
- Lowest pressure: 988 hPa (mbar); 29.18 inHg

Tropical storm
- 1-minute sustained (SSHWS/JTWC)
- Highest winds: 85 km/h (50 mph)
- Lowest pressure: 989 hPa (mbar); 29.21 inHg

Overall effects
- Fatalities: 146
- Areas affected: India; Nepal; Tibet
- Part of the 2026 North Indian Ocean cyclone season

Deep Depression BOB 06 was a relatively weak but deadly tropical storm whose remnants caused catastrophic flooding in the Indian state of Uttar Pradesh and Nepal. The sixth tropical storm of the 2026 North Indian Ocean cyclone season, the storm originated from a cyclonic circulation that emerged over the Andaman Sea on 18 September. After tracking northwestward, it concentrated into a depression on 21 September and intensified into a deep depression the next day. It made landfall on the northern Andhra Pradesh coast late early on 24 September and tracked northwestward inland, weakening to a low-pressure area on 27 September.

== Meteorological history ==
Map plotting the storm's track and intensity, according to the Saffir–Simpson scale Map key Saffir–Simpson scale Tropical depression (≤38 mph, ≤62 km/h) Tropical storm (39–73 mph, 63–118 km/h) Category 1 (74–95 mph, 119–153 km/h) Category 2 (96–110 mph, 154–177 km/h) Category 3 (111–129 mph, 178–208 km/h) Category 4 (130–156 mph, 209–251 km/h) Category 5 (≥157 mph, ≥252 km/h) Unknown Storm type Tropical cyclone Subtropical cyclone Extratropical cyclone, remnant low, tropical disturbance, or monsoon depression

On 16 September, the India Meteorological Department (IMD) began monitoring a cyclonic circulation over northern Thailand. The cyclonic circulation emerged over the Andaman Sea by 18 September, and a low-pressure area spawned the next day. The low organised as it moved westward, and by 12:00 UTC on 21 September it intensified into a depression over the westcentral Bay of Bengal. The system moved west-northwestward and organised with warm sea surface temperatures of 29–30 °C and low vertical wind shear, becoming a deep depression on 22 September. That same day, the United States Navy's Joint Typhoon Warning Center (JTWC) deemed the system a tropical storm and began issuing advisories on it as Tropical Cyclone 01B.

The storm was weakly steered westward by a subtropical ridge far to the northeast. Though its compact low-level circulation was initially partially exposed due to shear, it became obscured by clouds by mid-23 September. By 00:00 UTC on 24 September, the IMD assessed that the storm had reached its peak intensity with 3-minute sustained winds of 55 km/h and a minimum central pressure of 988 millibars. The JTWC assessed the storm's peak intensity at 85 km/h. It made landfall on the north Andhra Pradesh and south Odisha coasts southwest of Kalingapatnam during 5:30–7:30 UTC on 24 September. After landfall, the storm tracked north-northwestward, crossing the inland states of Chhattisgarh and Madhya Pradesh. It weakened to a low-pressure area over southeastern Uttar Pradesh by 00:00 UTC on 27 September.

== Preparations ==
=== India ===
The IMD advised fishermen not to venture out to sea upon the depression's designation.

==== Andhra Pradesh and Yanam ====
Rainfall warnings and alerts were issued for northern coastal Andhra Pradesh and the town of Yanam, Puducherry. Flash Flood Risk was issued along saturated watersheds in the northern districts of Andhra Pradesh, while Local Cautionary Signal Number III was issued for ports at Kalingapatnam, Bheemunipatnam, Visakhapatnam, Gangavaram, and Kakinada. A holiday was announced for public and private educational institutions in the districts of Alluri Sitharama Raju, Vizianagaram, Srikakulam, Visakhapatnam, and Anakapalli. Nine National Disaster Response Force and State Disaster Response Force teams were deployed across the Srikakulam, ASR, Visakhapatnam, Polavaram, and Anakapalli districts. 3,599 electrical utilities personnel were mobilised to respond to power outages.

==== Odisha ====
Portions of Odisha was placed under a rainfall warning. 33 Odisha Disaster Rapid Action Force (ODRAF) teams were mobilised in preparation for rain-related emergencies. Three teams each were deployed to the districts of Gajapati, Rayagada, and Malkangiri; while six each were deployed in the Ganjam and Koraput districts. The state government asked the Water Resources Department to regulate water levels of the reservoirs behind the Indravati and Telengiri Dams ahead of forecasted heavy rainfall.

In the Malkangiri district, schools were closed from 23 to 25 September. Eight shelter houses were identified, while ODRAF teams were stationed at low-lying bridges. Schools in the Koraput and Gajapati districts were also ordered to close until 24 September.

==== Uttar Pradesh ====
All of Uttar Pradesh was placed under a rainfall warning on 25 September.

==== Elsewhere ====
Rainfall warnings were issued for the states of Chhattisgarh, Telangana, Jharkhand, Gangetic West Bengal, eastern Madhya Pradesh, and Vidarbha.

== Impact ==
=== India ===
==== Andhra Pradesh ====
BOB 06 tracking inland over southeastern India shortly after landfall

As the storm approached the Andhra Pradesh coast, heavy rainfall affected the northern and coastal districts of the state. In a 24-hour period from 21 to 22 September, the town of Palasa recorded 141 mm (5.6 in) of rainfall, followed by 100 mm (3.9 in) in Gangaraju Madugula and 97 mm (3.8 in) in Bheemunipatnam. On 24 September, Visakhapatnam recorded 28 cm (11 in) of rainfall, followed by 20 cm (7.9 in) in Koyyalagudem and 15 cm (5.9 in) in Bheemunipatnam, Kakinada, and Peddapuram. Floods overflowed ponds, rivulets, and canals in Parvathipuram Manyam district and inundated low-lying areas in Vijayawada. Flooding also inundated the main roads connecting Anakapalli and Chodavaram. Nine people were killed in rain-related incidents across the state.

==== Odisha ====
As the storm approached landfall, increasing rainfall caused landslides and house collapses in part of the state. On 23 September, more than 16 locations recorded over 100 mm (3.9 in) of rainfall in a 24-hour period, with Semiliguda logging 230 mm (9.1 in) and Jeypore logging 160 mm (6.3 in). On 25 September, Tentulikhunti Village recorded 395 mm (15.6 in) of rainfall, followed by Nandahandi at 344 mm (13.5 in) and Borigumma at 308 mm (12.1 in). Water levels of the Jalaka, Budhabalanga, Baitarani, and Kani Rivers crossed their danger thresholds. Landslides blocked roads in the Gajapati and Malkangiri districts, and a landslide at Kalinga Ghat destroyed a 200-metre section of a retaining wall.

In response to flooding, over 75,000 people were evacuated away from vulnerable areas. Flooded bridges blocked traffic along National Highway 326. Parts of Bhubaneswar and Cuttack were flooded by spells of intense rain on 22 September.

==== Chhattisgarh ====
Heavy rains caused flooding that affected 22,300 people, partially or completely damaging over 11,000 houses and killing 172 livestock. Eight people were killed in the state, of which five were due to lightning strikes and one due to drowning.

==== Uttar Pradesh ====
As the depression interacted with a disturbance over northwestern India, catastrophic rainfall and flooding occurred over Uttar Pradesh, 56 districts within the state recorded excessive rainfall, wind gusts of 30–40 km/h (20–25 mph) uprooted trees and electric poles; inundating roads, lanes, and villages. The state recorded 66.5 mm of rainfall over a 48-hour period, compared to the normal 7.6 mm. Hardoi was hit most severely, seven people were injured and 272 houses were damaged out of the 1,021 reported statewide. In total, at least 81 people were killed with a further 62 injured, and 154 animals were killed.

=== Nepal ===
The depression's influence brought severe flooding to Nepal, just one month after a devastating flood killed more than 1,400 people at the Nepal–China border. Flooding and landslides damaged at least 12 hydropower projects, while extensive sections of the Galchhi–Betrawati–Rasuwagadhi road and the Prithvi Highway were damaged. 194 houses were also reported to be damaged. 31 people were killed, including several in avalanches.

=== Tibet ===
On 25 and 26 September, BOB 06 caused a severe snowstorm in Burang County, Tibet, according to the Culture and Tourism Bureau of Burang County.

== Aftermath ==
₹1.20 lakh in compensation is set to be provided for damaged houses in Chhattisgarh.
