= Cyclone Arnab =

North Indian Ocean cyclone in 2026

Very Severe Cyclonic Storm Arnab
- Arnab at peak intensity near southeastern India on 27 October

Meteorological history
- Formed: 24 October 2026
- Dissipated: 29 October 2026

Very severe cyclonic storm
- 3-minute sustained (IMD)
- Highest winds: 155 km/h (100 mph)
- Lowest pressure: 973 hPa (mbar); 28.73 inHg

Category 4-equivalent tropical cyclone
- 1-minute sustained (SSHWS/JTWC)
- Highest winds: 220 km/h (140 mph)
- Lowest pressure: 940 hPa (mbar); 27.76 inHg

Overall effects
- Fatalities: 26+
- Damage: >$550 million (2026 USD)
- Areas affected: Coastal Andhra; Odisha
- Part of the 2026 North Indian Ocean cyclone season

Very Severe Cyclonic Storm Arnab (Note: The name Arnab (Bengali: অর্ণব; [ˈɔɹnob]) was contributed by Bangladesh and means "ocean" in Bengali.) was a powerful tropical cyclone that affected South and East India. It was the eighth depression and the first cyclone of the 2026 North Indian Ocean cyclone season, and the strongest post-monsoon cyclone of the Bay of Bengal since 2014. The system meandered the Bay of Bengal as a low-pressure area born on 24 October before strengthening into the Cyclonic Storm Arnab on 26 October.

Undergoing rapid intensification, Arnab became a Very Severe Cyclonic storm during its westward trajectory towards the eastern coast of the Indian peninsula on 27 October. In response, Indian states of Andhra Pradesh and Odisha evacuated 180,000 people from coastal areas, ordered schools and colleges closed, suspended trains and flights in high-risk areas, and mobilised the National Disaster Response Force and the Indian Coast Guard. Fed by its interaction with a nearby tropical disturbance, Arnab made a stalled landfall on 28 October between Kakinada and Konaseema districts of Andhra Pradesh without losing intensity. It brought heavy rainfall in its area of influence while traveling northwards and weakening into a depression on 29 October over Chhattisgarh. The remnants subsequently collided with the westerlies over the Himalayas, triggering high-altitude snowfall.

Arnab caused extensive environmental, infrastructural, and agricultural damage, disrupting transportation, cellular communication, and power grids across Coastal Andhra and southern Odisha. Andhra Pradesh suffered nine fatalities and a property loss of ₹4,600 crores (US$483.14 million), with 325,000 hectares of crops inundated, 12,500 trees uprooted, and over 180 residences damaged across mainly Kakinada, Konaseema, and West Godavari districts. The incessant rainfall and the swelling of rivers Nagavali, Vamsadhara, Cheyyeru, and Rushikulya flooded Visakhapatnam, Parvathipuram Manyam, Vizianagaram, and Srikakulam districts as well as Odisha's Ganjam, Gajapati, and Kandhamal districts, where over 1000 villages were marooned, 1,672 houses destroyed, over 75,000 hectares of crops inundated, and 15 people died from a deluge-induced landslide. Effects of storm surge extended till Chennai, Tamil Nadu. Mitigation efforts were expedited by deploying special police units. Further alerts of torrential precipitation were issued to areas in the inland system's northern path—Chattisgarh, Jharkhand, Bihar, West Bengal, Vidarbha, eastern Madhya Pradesh, and eastern Uttar Pradesh, as well as avalanche and flash flood alerts in Nepal, where an intense blizzard battered its Koshi, Bagmati, and Gandaki provinces.

News outlets reported that IMD forecasts underestimated Arnab's intensification and movement, providing a narrower time frame for the government agencies in civilian evacuation and other precautionary measures. The role of the global climate phenomenon El Niño in Arnab's trail of destruction and the broader Bay of Bengal cyclone season was a topic of widespread media coverage in India. The Government of India sent two teams of delegates to examine and assess damages in Andhra Pradesh and Odisha. In less than a week after Arnab, Cyclone Murasu emerged and struck Andhra Pradesh again.

== Meteorological history ==
Map plotting the storm's track and intensity, according to the Saffir–Simpson scale Map key Saffir–Simpson scale Tropical depression (≤38 mph, ≤62 km/h) Tropical storm (39–73 mph, 63–118 km/h) Category 1 (74–95 mph, 119–153 km/h) Category 2 (96–110 mph, 154–177 km/h) Category 3 (111–129 mph, 178–208 km/h) Category 4 (130–156 mph, 209–251 km/h) Category 5 (≥157 mph, ≥252 km/h) Unknown Storm type Tropical cyclone Subtropical cyclone Extratropical cyclone, remnant low, tropical disturbance, or monsoon depression

On 20 October, the India Meteorological Department (IMD) commenced monitoring the Bay of Bengal for a low-pressure area that was likely to develop within the successive 24 hours. Three days later, a low-pressure area formed over the eastcentral–southcentral Bay of Bengal under the influence of an upper-level cyclonic circulation. Favourable conditions prevailed over the central Bay of Bengal, with the Madden–Julian oscillation enhancing thunderstorm activity. Sea surface temperatures were 30 °C (86 °F), while wind shear was moderate. By 12:00 UTC on 24 October, the well-marked low pressure area concentrated into a depression over the central Bay of Bengal. The tropical disturbance, marked Invest 98B by the United States Navy and Air Force's Joint Typhoon Warning Center (JTWC), consisted of a partially exposed but consolidating low-level circulation and developing banding features to the south and east of the depression’s vicinity as a TCFA (Tropical Cyclone Formation Alert) was issued at 11:00 UTC. On 25 October at 09:30 UTC, the IMD reported that the system intensified to a deep depression.

On 26 October, the system strengthened into a cyclonic storm and was assigned the name Arnab, given by Bangladesh as per the tropical cyclone nomenclature. 12 hours later, Arnab intensified into a severe cyclonic storm. Six hours later, Arnab intensified into a very severe cyclonic storm, and approached the Indian state of Andhra Pradesh quickly in a straight direct path. The storm underwent rapid intensification, with wind speeds increasing by 74 km/h in the 24 hours between the mornings of 26 and 27 October. The storm reached peak intensity with sustained winds of 150–160 km/h, gusting to 180 km/h. The rapid intensification as well as the speed of movement towards land were faster than IMD had predicted.

Arnab at its peak intensity on 27 October 2026 before its landfall between Yanam and Narasapuram

Arnab advanced its landfall forecast by roughly six hours, and crossed the Andhra Pradesh coast southwest of Yanam between 27 October 20:30 and 28 October 02:30 UTC before weakening into a severe cyclonic storm. The core wind speed was 125-135 km/h, gusting up to 150 km/h. Arnab remained stationary over its landfall region, thereby slowing the landfall process. From its inland position, it turned and started moving perpendicularly to its previous path, northward into southern Chattisgarh, where it weakened into a deep depression at 18:30 UTC on 28 October, and further degrading into a depression on the same day by 22:00 UTC. The outer belts of the remnants began dissipating over the northern-central region of India. By 03:00 UTC on 30 October, the system had dissipated into a well-marked low-pressure area over northern Chhattisgarh and eastern Madhya Pradesh; the associated cyclonic circulation extended up to 4.5 km above mean sea level. The dissipated remnants of Arnab continued northwards and interacted with the prevailing westerlies over Nepal on 29 October.

The U.S. agency NASA (National Aeronautics and Space Administration) noted that Arnab's formation is "a rather late start for a basin that typically produces named cyclones in April or May." Cyclone Montha, 2025's first cyclone of Bay of Bengal but the second overall of the 2025 season, also made landfall in the same location as Arnab on 29 October 2025.

== Preparations and impact ==
=== India ===
As Arnab made landfall between Andhra Pradesh's Bapatla and Visakhapatnam districts, a heavily settled area home to large urban centers, farmland, and fishing communities, the cyclone caused extensive damage, by uprooting trees, inundating crops, collapsing homes, limiting fishing operations, and disrupting transportation and power networks. Over 180,000 people have been evacuated.

==== Andhra Pradesh ====
Arnab nearing northern Andhra Pradesh and southern Odisha on 26 October 2026

The IMD declared red alerts in seven districts in Andhra Pradesh on 26 October. 15 teams from the National Disaster Response Force (NDRF) were mobilised in Andhra Pradesh while ₹27 crore in relief was released by the state. Schools in 10 districts were closed. By 27 October, at least 89,000 people were evacuated in Andhra Pradesh. The state called on boats to return from sea and identified 570,000 people as vulnerable in preparation for evacuations. By 26 October, Andhra Pradesh officials stated that over 30,000 fishing boats had returned to harbour. The Chintoor Integrated Tribal Development Officer directed the suspension of tourism boat operations to the Papikonda hills in Godavari Valley. Rail service on 53 routes in southern India were suspended on 27–28 October, including the Godavari Express, Gowthami Express, Visakha Express, Falaknuma Express, Narasapur Express, and the Garib Rath Express. Twenty-one flights were cancelled at Vijayawada Airport and Visakhapatnam Airport, with cancellations also occurring at Gannavaram Airport.

As Arnab approached landfall, several locations of Coastal Andhra recorded heavy rainfall exceeding 200 mm, while strong winds uprooted trees and power poles, blocked roads and disrupted electricity supply. The sea surged to 1–1.5 metres near the landfall zone. According to the Chief Minister of Andhra Pradesh, 57,000 people were moved to relief camps, 70,900 hectares of paddy and 10,450 hectares of horticultural crops were ruined, and 180 houses damaged. The crop loss was subsequently updated to be 325,000 hectares, spanning 2,727 villages in 249 mandals of the state. The damaged crops were paddy, maize, green gram, black gram, groundnut, banana, papaya, coconut, betel, cocoa, and vegetable fields. In coastal settlements, fishermen suffered heavy losses, with their boats and fishing nets swept away.

Electrical grids were widely damaged across the affected areas, cutting-off electricity to various settlements and halting cellular networks. 15,000 electric poles also collapsed. Two people died in separate electrocution incidents: a 53-year-old man died in Visakhapatnam district on 27 October after coming into contact with a snapped live wire in an agricultural field channel; a 55-year-old woman died on 28 October in Anakapalli district after stepping on an exposed live wire outside her house. Another person was killed by a falling tree in Bhimavaram, West Godavari district. Four more deaths from collapsed structures were confirmed: three died from collapsed electricity poles and one from a collapsed hut. The highest rainfall was recorded in Gopalapatnam (31 cm) of Vishakhpatnam district and Kothavalasa in Vizianagaram district (30 cm). On 29 October, the death toll increased to nine in Andhra Pradesh.

Map showing the districts of Andhra Pradesh; Arnab made landfall between Konaseema and Kakinada districts, mainly affecting the northern panhandle of the state.

Kakinada district, hundreds of trees and fewer than hundred electric poles were uprooted, and the entirety of the Uppada coastal road had succumbed to the sea. In Alluri district, an old bridge was washed away, isolating a village. The Kothavalasa-Kirandul railway line suffered damage from soil erosion. 12,500 trees were uprooted in West Godavari district. 400 trees were uprooted in Vishakhapatnam district, where low-lying areas submerged in floodwater, which entered numerous residential homes. As power supply couldn't be restored until Wednesday morning, neighborhoods were plunged into darkness. Flight operations at Vishakhapatnam's INS Dega airport was suspended since the afternoon of 27 October, while flights at Vijayawada and Rajahmundry were suspended after 00:30 UTC on 28 October. In Konaseema district, gusty winds reached up to 130 kmph. A cargo ship carrying sulphur ran aground in the sea near Antarvedi village due to engine failure. The Indian Coast Guard rescued 20 crew members of another ship, a Marshall Islands bulk carrier ship called Sigma Pearl, stranded near the shore of Antarvedi village due to the rough conditions, by airlifting them off the vessel.

In Srikakulam district, roads and bridges in 35 locations across were damaged as the rivers Nagavali, Vamsadhara, and Cheyyeru were in spate. Parvathipuram Manyam and Vizianagaram districts were also flooded by overflowing rivulets. Cheyyeru flooded Ichchapuram town and submerged a nearby railway bridge. National Highway 16 was submerged. Many villages in the coastal districts have been without power for two days. On 30 October, it was estimated that Andhra Pradesh had suffered a loss of ₹4,600 crores (US$483.14 million) due to Arnab.

==== Odisha ====
The Government of Odisha declared that over 1,700 shelters were prepared in the state's southern districts. Eight NDRF teams and 40 Odisha Disaster Rapid Action Force teams were mobilised. The closure of schools and colleges in five districts was announced for 28–29 October.

Arnab began weakening over southern Chattisgardh and adjoining Odisha after its stalled landfall on 28 October 2026, bringing relentless rainfall to the region.

In Odisha, roughly 1,18,000 people were affected by Arnab, as well as damages to 75,388 hectares of crops and 1,672 houses. A tree fell on a house and caused a brick wall to collapse, killing a 40-year-old woman in Puri. IMD has issue heavy rainfall alerts to Ganjam, Gajapati, Rayagada, Koraput, Malkangiri, Nabarangpur, and Kalahandi districts, threatening widespread crop inundation. Following heavy rainfall, 17 districts of Odisha suffered damage. Around 300 villages were cut-off in Ganjam district. On 30 October, torrential rainfall triggered a landslide that killed three in Dangesi village of Kandhamal district. Ganjam also witnessed a landslide on 31 October, burrying the Gidipabali hamelt of its Bhanjanagar block; the hamlet had a population of 26, fourteen of whom were relocated and twelve remained missing. On 2 November, two were found dead and 10 remained missing. The search operations were called off two days later, with the ten presumed dead.

More than 1,05,000 people were affected by the floods in Ganjam, while over 25,000 were affected in Gajapati. Several roads and bridges where washed away or rendered unusable. Around 300 m (980 ft) of National Highway 326 was washed away in Mohana block of Gajapati district, disrupting connectivity with Ganjam. The collapse of a bridge in Mohana block further affected connectivity. The incessant rainfall affected more than 1,000 villages across Ganjam and Gajapati districts. Around 42,500 people have been affected in Ganjam and nearly 20,000 in Gajapati. Floodwaters also disrupted railway services in the region, with several trains cancelled or diverted. Rivers such as the Rushikulya and Vamsadhara swelled, compounding the crisis and leaving several habitations marooned.

According to the Chief Minister of Odisha, Mohan Charan Majhi of the BJP, "the state was expecting damages in Malkangiri district bordering Andhra Pradesh, but Arnab wreaked havoc in Ganjam, Gajapati and Kandhamal districts." The government was met with censure from the opposition Biju Janata Dal, Indian National Congress, and Communist Party of India, who alleged that the Majhi administration had failed to implement adequate preventive measures despite warnings from the IMD. The central team led by Ravi Shankar arrived in Bhubaneswar on November 2 to assess the damage caused by Arnab and subsequent flooding.

==== Tamil Nadu ====
Persistent rainfall in the Nilgiris district in Tamil Nadu caused as many as 69 landslips on 25 and 26 October, damaging power lines, revetments, and 16 huts. On October 27, the northern coast of Tamil Nadu began experiencing rough seas and storm surge, with alerts issued to the Greater Chennai Corporation, and the districts of Tiruvallur, Chengalpattu, Vilupuram, and Cuddalore. In North Chennai, rapidly advancing waves overtopped the shoreline rock embankment and spilled onto the Ennore Expressway; police temporarily closed the road and diverted the traffic. Seashore residents of Ennore, Tiruvottiyur and Mamallapuram were evacuated to safer areas.

==== Chattisgarh ====
IMD issued heavy to very heavy rainfall alerts to districts of Chattisgarh. School education minister Gajendra Yadav recommended a two-day holidays for schools in 12 vulnerable districts such as Bastar, Bijapur, Dantewada, Kondagaon and Sukma. Raipur district collector Gaurav Singh declared schools and colleges closed on 29 October. Blood red skies were reported in Chattisgarh's Dantewada district.

==== Elsewhere ====
The Government of Jharkhand ordered schools in Ranchi, Simdega, East Singhbhum and West Singhbum closed til 29 October as a precaution against heavy rainfall. As the system moved northward after making landfall and continues disintegrating, heavy rainfall alerts were issued to morthern and eastern states of India, such as Chattisgarh, Bihar, gangetic West Bengal, eastern Uttar Pradesh, eastern Madhya Pradesh, and parts of Telangana. IMD also placed Raigad and Ratnagiri districts of Maharashtra under yellow alert. Between 28 and 29 October, some southern districts of West Bengal received heavy rain; Sagar Island in South 24 Parganas district received 82mm of rain and Purulia district received 61mm. IMD bulletins declared that, although Arnab has significantly diminished in intensity, its remnants might bring rainfall and thunderstorms inland states, with localised flooding and waterlogging remaining possible in alerted areas. It advised civilians to remain alert for changing weather conditions, stay indoors during thunderstorms, avoid taking shelter under trees, unplug electrical and electronic appliances, and keep away from objects that conduct electricity.

=== Nepal ===
Nepal braced for adverse weather from October 27 for intense rainfall, thunderstorms, and snowfall across parts of the country. The country's Koshi, Bagmati, Gandaki, and Lumbini provinces faced widespread rain, nonseasonal snowfall, and thunderstorms from 29 to 31 October 2026. Heavy snowfall in the Himalayan high-altitude areas and freezing temperatures in lower regions stranded approximately 250 domestic and foreign tourists along routes such as the Kanchenjunga trekking circuit. Trekkers heading toward Makalu base camp via the Lumba Sumba pass were held up in places like Ulang Chukung Gola. The Nepal Meteorology Development warned the Terai regions of flash flood risks as well. India's Himalayan states of Uttarakhand, Himachal Pradesh, and Sikkim, as well as parts of West Bengal's northern districts, witnessed intermittent and heavy bouts of rain accompanied by cold winds and sudden drops in temperature.

== Aftermath ==
=== Relief and restoration ===
The National Disaster Response Force (NDRF) was deployed to mitigate the impact of Arnab. The Chief Minister of Andhra Pradesh announced compensation of ₹5 lakhs (US$5,266) to each bereaved family. The Government of Telangana volunteered to aid Andhra Pradesh in its restoration efforts. Deputy Chief Minister and Minister of Energy of Telangana, Bhatti Vikramarka, assured his government's full support in managing the crisis, dispatching technical personnel and essential materials to Andhra for power restoration. In the APEPDL service area, as of 30 October, electricity has been restored to 4,881 of the 5,404 affected villages; of the 552 damaged substations, 513 were restored, marking 93 percent restoration complete within 2 days of the cyclone's impact. In the severely affected Konaseema and West Godavari districts, electricity returned in 87 of 316 villages, and 154 of 318 villages, respectively, as of 30 October. In the Krishna district, which is administered by APCPDL, power was restored to 867 of the 915 affected villages. Out of the 1,045 damaged cellular towers in the affects areas of Andhra Pradesh, 661 have been fixed as of 30 October.

Two "central" teams, representing the Government of India, arrived in Andhra Pradesh on 31 October to assess the damaged caused by Arnab. One was led by Chittaranjan Das, Joint Secretary in the Union Ministry of Home Affairs, and visiting Konaseema district's damaged coastal habitations and fishing communities, and the other, led by Central Water Commission official Kollu Rekharani and Union Ministry of Rural Development official Alok Jawahar, which began investigation with East Godavari district's inundated paddies and horticultural plantations.

In the flood-hit Ichchapuram, over 10,000 were accommodated in relief camps. Approximately 380 TMC of water was produced by the rainfall across Andhra Pradesh between 26 and 29 October 2026. 4.68 TMC was collected in reservoirs with an additional 5 to 6 TMC estimated to be collected. Minor irrigation tanks received 22 TMC, with a further 8 to 12 TMC expected as of 30 October. Groundwater reserves increased by 44 TMC, and additional 16 TMC and 12 TMC of water has been estimated to be the inflow of Gotta Barrage and Madduvalasa Reservoir.

With thousand villages cut off from urban centers by floodwater in Odisha's Ganjam, Gajapati, and Kandhamal districts, packets of food and supplies were air-dropped into the villages via defence helicopters, with allocated personnel for distribution of the packets across 21 identified locations. The Odisha Disaster Rapid Action Force (ODRAF), a specialised unit of Odisha Police, were deployed in Hinjilicut, Purushottampur, Seragada, Dharakote, Aska, Belaguntha, Bhanjanagar and Chikiti. As of 30 October 2026, over 26,000 people were staying in relief camps arranged by the government of Odisha. On 31 October, it was reported that Ganjam's 367 relief camps accommodated over 40,000 people. Odisha also engaged its Special Operation Group, an anti-terrorist police unit, in its search operations for missing persons. The number of cut-off villages in Odisha dropped from 1000 to three by 31 October. Hindalco Industries Limited, a unit of the multinational conglomerate Aditya Birla Group, stepped forward to extend assistance to families affected by Arnab in Ganjam district by dispatching two truckloads of essential relief materials for distribution among the affected households. The Government of Odisha has sanctioned over ₹107.44 crores (US$11.44 million) for Ganjam district's 429,782 affected families and ₹26.27 lakhs (US$27,973) for Koraput district's 1,051 families; each family were to receive ₹2,500 (US$ 26.62).

Around 80% of electricity grids were restored by 31 October. TP Southern Odisha Distribution Limited, the joint venture between Tata Power and the Government of Odisha, said that electricty had been restored to 17 lakh consumers across southern Odisha. The flood-damaged National Highway 16, which connects Kolkata to Chennai via cities in Andhra Pradesh and Odisha, was reopened on the same date after the water level in the river Bahuda declined. In light of the disaster, President Droupadi Murmu, who was set to embark on a three-day tour of Odisha on November 3 cancelled her visit and spoke to the Chief Minister of Odisha to enquire about the relief efforts.

=== Fujiwhara interaction ===
Enhanced infrared satellite image showing Cyclone Arnab and tropical storm 03B interacting with one another as they made landfall in southeastern India on 27 October

Independent weather forecasters reported that a "lingering" low-pressure system, which was retroactively upgraded as a tropical storm by the JTWC, codenamed Invest 90B (03B) over south-west Bay of Bengal. It provided Tamil Nadu nearly 10 days of widespread rainfall, and may have supplied additional moisture to Arnab when it approached the coast, potentially helping it maintain its cloud bands. Advisories from the IMD acknowledged the interaction between Arnab and the low-pressure area but did not describe it as a Fujiwhara effect.

Down to Earth described this phenomenon as a "curious case" overlooked by the IMD, attributing the rapid intensification, sustained strength, and the stalled landfall of Arnab to Tropical Storm 03B's merger with Arnab, as per data from the U.S. Automated Tropical Cyclone Forecasting System. It also reported that Zoom Earth depicted the low-pressure system's track until it approached the Odisha coast on 28 October at 05:30 UTC, whereas Windy of the European Centre for Medium-Range Weather Forecasts (ECMWF) showed the system's interaction with Arnab as late as 12:30 UTC, suggesting the system's merger with the cyclone as it attempted to circumvent the latter's eastern periphery.

=== Climate change and El Niño ===
A study by researchers at Imperial College London's Grantham Institute attributed 33 percent of Arnab's economic damages to climate change; they claimed that climate change increased the cyclone's maximum wind speed by approximately 5 percent and intensified its eyewall rainfall rate by 11 percent at landfall. The study used the Imperial College Storm Model (IRIS) to simulate Arnab under current climate conditions, with global temperatures approximately 1.3 °C above pre-industrial levels, and compared the results with a hypothetical scenario without human-induced global warming. According Dr. Nathan Sparks of the institue's physics department, "these findings are a powerful reminder of the price of inaction. The costs of climate change are not hypothetical future projections—they are hitting coastal communities in eastern India today."

The role of El Niño was a subject of widespread media coverage during Arnab's formation and destruction. Based on data from the JTWC, independent weather organization Vagaries of Weather described Arnab as the strongest post-monsoon cyclone in the Bay of Bengal since 2014. The Hindu opined that forecast models of IMD failed to predict the rapid intensification of Arnab, as it moved faster towards the coast than anticipated and made landfall earlier than IMD had said it would—at midnight—giving many district authorities a narrower window period to evacute in high-risk areas. The publication appreciated the relatively low death figures as a testament to proactive governance but criticized its disruptive approach, claiming that the risk of civilian poverty from lost possessions and livelihood remains. Kirishna S Vatsa, member of the Indian National Disaster Management Authority, said that improved preparedness and forecasting significantly reduced mortality from cyclones but economic loss remains substantial. Intergovernmental Panel on Climate Change (IPCC) author Anjal Prakash called for climate-resilient housing, stronger electric grids, flood-proof roads, and better insurance for farmers and workers.

The Indian Express also reported IMD's short-sight, highlighting that while El Niño generally decreases the overall frequency of tropical cyclones forming in the Bay of Bengal, it increases the individual intensity of the storms that do form and shift their tracks toward southern states like Andhra Pradesh and Tamil Nadu rather than the traditional northern route towards Odisha and West Bengal. The Times of India also reported on this phenomenon, stating that while scientists have not established that El Niño coupled with unusually warm Bay of Bengal surface temperatures will directly increase cyclonic frequency, they have warned that cyclones that do form over warm waters will show an increased tendency for rapid intensification and move ashore faster, resulting in heavier precipitation and lesser time to prepare. According to IMD director-general KJ Ramesh, El Niño "may have" contributed to Arnab's intensity. Akshay Deoras, researcher scientist at University of Reading, England, also agreed by saying that El Niño "can play" a significant role as conditions are now extremely favorable for cyclogenesis in the Bay of Bengal.

On 29 October, at the same time Arnab was degenerating over north-central India, IMD identified a low-pressure area formed due to an upper-level cyclonic circulation over south Andaman Sea. It predicted the system to gradually strengthen and move northeast towards Andhra Pradesh, similar to Arnab. The New Indian Express opined that "the weather situation remains dynamic. The immediate focus is on tracking the second system, whose development over the next few days will determine whether [Andhra] faces another significant spell of adverse weather." IMD officials told The Telegraph that while back-to-back cyclones are unusual, they are not unprecedented. The low-pressure area eventually intensified into the cyclone Murasu, whose emergence hampered the relief and restoration efforts already undergoing after Arnab.

== See also ==
- Tropical cyclones in 2026
- Weather of 2026
