= Murasu =

Unpitched percussion instrument

- Nagara murasu

Percussion instrument
- Classification: Percussion
- Developed: Tamil Nadu, India

The murasu (Tamil: முரசு) is a type of drum that originated in Tamil Nadu, India several centuries ago.

Three types of Murasu are known.

- Veera Murasu (martial drum), a kettle drum used for military purposes. It may be mounted on a tall platform called a Murasu Kattil.
- Thyaga Murasu (charity drum), a drum used when giving gifts, also used to invite poor people to receive goods.
- Nyāya Murasu (judgement drum), a drum used to call people to judicial proceedings or to submit their grievances requiring judgement.

The murasu was used for disseminating information during the ancient period, as mentioned in the Sangam Literature. It must have been used to inform people about natural disasters too.

== See also ==
- Ancient Tamil music
- Cyclone Murasu
