= Godavari Express =

Godavari Express may refer to these passenger trains in India named after the Godavari River.

- Hyderabad–Visakhapatnam Godavari Express
- Lokmanya Tilak Terminus–Manmad Godavari Express

== See also ==
- Godavari River
