= Royapuram Fishing Harbour =

Major fishing ground in Chennai, India

Coordinates: 13.12555°N 80.297645°E

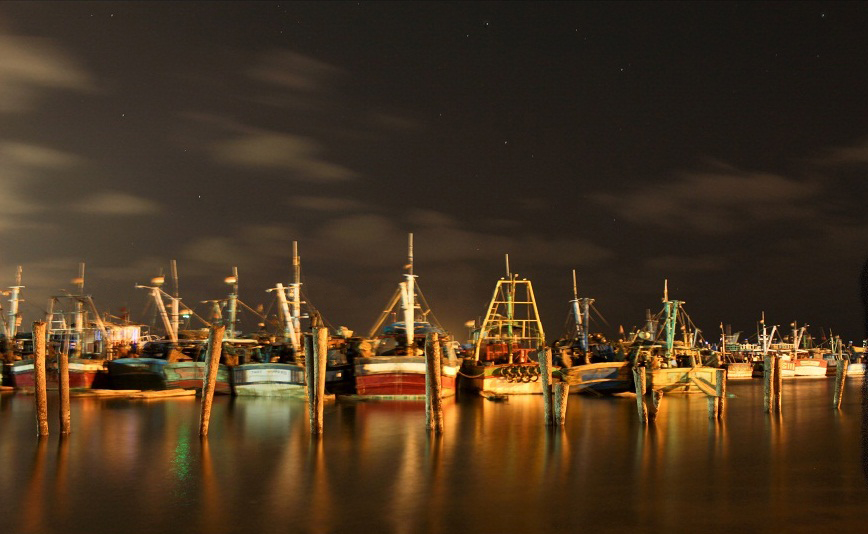
Royapuram Fishing Harbour

Royapuram Fishing Harbour, also known as Chennai Fishing Harbour or Kasimedu Fishing Harbour, is one of the major fishing grounds for catching fishes and crustaceans located at Kasimedu in the Royapuram area of Chennai, India. The harbour is located north of the Chennai Port and is under the administrative control of the Chennai Port Trust. The harbour is also a shipbuilding facility, chiefly building fishing boats. The nearest railway station is the Royapuram Railway Station.

The harbour can accommodate 575 fishing boats, and by 2013 the number of boats had gone up to 1,395.

== History ==
The harbour area is primarily a fisherman community area migrated from Chepauk village in 1799 during the rule of the East India Company. The harbour was constructed in 1975, and has functioned from 1984. It suffered an extensive damage during the 2004 Indian Ocean tsunami.

== The harbour and the market ==
The breakwater inside the harbour leads up to 300 m into the sea. The draft alongside the wharf is 2 m. The harbour has a capacity to handle about 575 fishing craft but over 1,395 boats use the space. Over 600 45-ft boats (each operated by 11 people), 200 30-ft boats (each operated by 4 people) and 300 fibre boats with outboard motors (each operated by 3 to 4 people), in addition to hundreds of catamarans, use the harbour.

Nearly 30,000 people visit the auction hall situated near the harbour every day. Of the daily sales amounting to 200 tonnes, nearly 30 per cent is sent to other states such as Karnataka and Kerala, and the remaining is provided for local markets.

A retail fish market known as the Kasimedu fishing harbour market with 90 stalls is located within the Chennai fishing harbour complex adjacent to the auction shed of the fishing harbour and behind the Office of the Fishing Harbour Management Committee. It sells a variety of fishes including seer, pomfret, prawn, shark, sardine, crab, silverbellies, carangids and mackerel.

== Expenditure ==
As of 2018, there are an estimated 1,000 mechanised boats at the fishing harbour. It costs ₹ 115,000 for a small 98 to 110 horsepower, 50-feet-long mechanised boat to spend three days at sea. The sum needed for a large boat to stay out for a week at a time is around ₹ 300,000.

== Damage by tsunami ==
The harbour was extensively damaged by the 2004 Indian Ocean tsunami, especially the 500-m trawler wharf, which can berth nearly 500 mechanised boats. The tsunami resulted in the destruction of about 61 trawlers in the harbour, in addition to partly damaging 43 trawlers and causing minor damage to nearly 400 trawlers. The total loss is estimated at ₹ 160-200 million.

== Developments ==
Among its various activities along the coast of India, Ocean Science and Technology for Islands (OSTI) of the National Institute of Ocean Technology (NIOT) undertakes biofouling studies at the harbour.

In December 2011, the Fisheries Department issued work order for a project to improve the facilities at the fishing harbour at a cost of ₹ 170 million. The renovation also includes demolition and rebuilding of the auction hall. The work is expected to be completed by 2012.

A 2.5-acre land in Kasimedu has been shortlisted along with a 7-acre land in Vaniyanchavadi on Rajiv Gandhi Salai for a modern fish processing park. The park would initially focus mainly on fish catch by 600 mechanised boats in Chennai. The park is likely to attract large fishing vessels to Chennai to facilitate value addition to their catch. Now Chennai receives fish arrivals through just five or six large fishing vessels.

In April 2013, Chief Minister J. Jayalalithaa announced that the harbour would be upgraded, including creating additional mooring space, at a cost of ₹ 750 million. The development project includes a 300-metre-long wharf along the northern breakwater; a 200-metre-long wharf for fibre-reinforced plastic (FRP) boats; extending the northern wharf (existing boat yard) by 140 metres; two 150-metre-long finger jetties; two 200-metre-long finger jetties; new repairing centre; deepening the harbour; and a sanitary complex. The project is intended to benefit 12,000 fishermen directly and 15,000 fishermen and workers indirectly.

== See also ==
- Chennai Port
- Ennore Port
