= Madaram =

- Location in Telangana, India Madaram (India)
- Coordinates: 19°09′55″N 79°24′35″E
- Country: India
- State: Telangana
- District: Adilabad

Population (2011)
  - Total: 6,691

Languages
  - Official: Telugu
- Time zone: UTC+5:30 (IST)
- Vehicle registration: TS
- Website: telangana.gov.in

Madaram is a census town in Mancherial district

in the Indian state of Telangana.

== Demographics ==
As of 2001 India census, Madaram had a population of 6691. Males constitute 51% of the population and females 49%. Madaram has an average literacy rate of 63%, higher than the national average of 59.5%: male literacy is 72%, and female literacy is 54%. In Madaram, 9% of the population is under 6 years of age.
