= Kunkalamarru =

- village
- Interactive map of Kunkalamarru
- Location in Andhra Pradesh, India Kunkalamarru (India)
- Coordinates: 15°52′56.42″N 80°19′1.24″E
- Country: India
- State: Andhra Pradesh
- District: Bapatla

Languages
  - Official: Telugu
- Time zone: UTC+5:30 (IST)
- Nearest city: Guntur
- Lok Sabha constituency: Bapatla
- Vidhan Sabha constituency: parchur

Kunkalamarru is a village under Karamchedu Mandal approximately 15 km (9.3 mi) from the commercial town of Chirala in Bapatla district in the state of Andhra Pradesh, India. Its neighbouring villages are Karamchedu and Veerannapalem.

== History ==
Kunkalamarru benefited from the irrigation facilities provided by the century-old, British-built Krishna and the post-Independence Nagarjunasagar canals. Kunkalamarru is the only village where the canal stretches alongside of the village for long. The fertile irrigated land and the tobacco farming in the Nizam area were the major sources of prosperity of the village. Kunkalamarru village became known when Mallampati Venkanna Chowdary from the village was elected as ZPTC member. The village preliminaries has been fulfilled by Ravi Sudhakar & Srikanth Charitable Trust.

Agriculture is the main profession of this village, it is still waiting for industrial development. Education, drinking water, road and electricity are the main concern of this village. The younger generation is more attracted towards mobile, laptop and computer technology. Medical and health services has to be improved.

== Demographics ==
According to Indian census, 2001, the demographic details of Kunkalamarru Village is as follows:

- Total Population: 5502 in 1503 households.

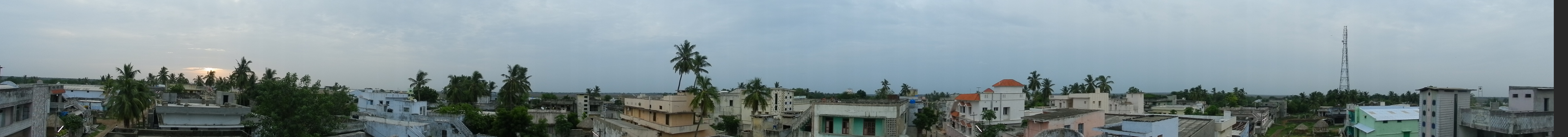
