= Col (meteorology) =

Type of pressure pattern on weather map

Diagram of the position of the col between pressure highs and lows in the Northern Hemisphere.

A col, also called saddle point or neutral point, is in meteorology, the point of intersection of a trough and a ridge in the pressure pattern of a weather map. It takes the form of a saddle where the air pressure is relatively higher than that of the low-pressure regions, but lower than that of the anticyclonic zones.

In a barometric col, the winds are relatively calm and varying in direction. The weather is also unsettled and favourable for winter fog or summer storms due to the accumulation of moisture in the air mass due to lack of ventilation. It is thus often the position of a stationary or quasi-stationary front.

== Description ==
In a weather map as the one to the right, a col is a region where the position of highs (H) and lows (L) produces a convergence or divergence of the airflow, such as with two juxtaposed highs and two juxtaposed lows. Such a pattern packs isotherms and moisture so that, at the point called Z, warm air is advected from the South (TI) while cold air comes from the North (PI); then the flow spreads the airmass from one to the other, forming a stationary front.

Any other arrangement that permits confluence of the air flow leads to the formation of a col. In any case, the col is always identified as an area of slack pressure.

== Types ==
In the real atmosphere, highs and lows have rarely the same strength and thus equal wind flow pattern around them. Thus the advection of warm or cold air is rarely equal. Furthermore, their shape and position are rarely as perfect as in the illustration quadrants either. There are thus three types of saddles or cols: the symmetrical, the cyclonic and anticyclonic.

Symmetric

In the symmetrical saddle area, cyclonic and anticyclonic flows are in balance. This type is the least prevalent, since usually one of these two influences prevails.

Anticyclonic

In the anticyclonic col, the curvature of the high pressure area isobars is greater than that of the cyclonic flow. The influence of the adjoining high-pressure areas dominates so the formation of a strong front here is unlikely. The weather is very calm and is mainly determined by the air mass properties. In warm mass, especially in the winter and during summer nights, fog and stratus form. It is usually sunny during daytime in summer but cumulus clouds may persist in colder mass.

Cyclonic

In the cyclonic col, the curvature of the cyclonic isobars is greater than that of the anticyclonic flow. As a result, the adjacent low-pressure areas dominate and the properties are comparable with a trough. The resulting convergent air movement causes frontal clouds and precipitation in humid air. In case of unstable air, strong thunderstorms often occur during the summer.
