= Odisha State Disaster Management Authority =

Odisha Disaster Management Authority

Agency overview
- Formed: 1999
- Type: Agency
- Jurisdiction: Government of Odisha
- Headquarters: Rajiv Bhavan, Unit 5, Bhubaneswar, Odisha
- Agency executive: Aditya Prasad Padhi, IAS, Chief Secretary, Govt of Odisha
- Parent department: Ministry of Revenue & Disaster Management (Odisha)
- Website: www.osdma.org

Odisha State Disaster Management Authority is an agency of the Department of Revenue & Disaster Management whose primary purpose is to carry out responses to natural or man-made disasters and for capacity-building in disaster resiliency and crisis response. It was established as the Odisha State Disaster Mitigation Authority by a resolution of the Department of Finance of the Government of Odisha on 28 December 1999, as a response to the death toll and damage caused by a 1999 supercyclone. The chief secretary of Government of Odisha is the ex-officio chairperson of the governing body of the authority.

== History ==
Prior to establishment of the authority, emergency management in Odisha was not a specialised function, and was handled by the district administration. However, after the 1999 supercyclone this approach was found lacking. Due to lack of coordination on various organisations and departments, rescue and relief works were severely hampered, resulting in a death toll of about 10,000. The Government of Odisha then created a comprehensive disaster response plan, including the Odisha Disaster Rapid Action Force as an agency of the Department of Revenue & Disaster Management making it the first and one of its kind disaster management and relief agency in the country. Its primary purpose was to carry out response to natural or man-made disasters and for capacity-building in disaster resiliency and crisis response. It was later renamed to its present name.

== Organisation ==
The authority is operationally organized into the following divisions:

- Disaster Management Division (Preparedness)
- Shelter Management and Capacity Building Division
- Projects Division (Disaster Resilient Construction)
- Mechanical Division (Emergency Equipment Management)
- Finance division

== Functions and responsibilities ==
As the apex body, the authority is mandated to carry out and plan for disaster management to ensure timely and effective response to disasters. To achieve this, it has the following responsibilities:

- It carries out disaster mitigation activities such as mock drills and evacuation in vulnerable areas.
- Carry out reconstruction activities while coordinating other departments.
- Work with aid agencies, United Nations agencies, international, national and state-level non-governmental organizations for disaster management activities
- Work with other state and national level relevant organizations for disaster management.
- Prepare and issue guidelines for disaster management for local administrations and other organisations.
- It also carries out preemptive disaster mitigation activities such as construction of cyclone shelters, early warning systems and preparedness drills
- In addition to the major natural disasters like cyclones, floods, and Earthquakes, the Odisha State Disaster Management Authority is also the primary organisation for capacity improvement to face events such as Lightning, heat wave, whirlwind, tornado, heavy rain, drowning, boat accident and snake bite.

== Programmes ==
The Odisha State Disaster Management Authority runs many programmes for disaster management:

- National Programme for Capacity Building of Architects in Earthquake Risk Management
- Disaster Risk Management Program
- National Programme for Capacity Building of Engineers in Earthquake Risk Management
- Building Early warning system such as cyclone and tsunami alert siren towers in coastal areas.
- Training a canine unit for rescue assistance.

== Awards ==
It was awarded the Skoch Award, 2018 for its work in disaster management.

== Disaster response ==
The Odisha State Disaster Management Authority has proved its efficacy with its commendable performance during various disasters hitting the state of Odisha. Some of the major response operations have been:

2005

- Flood in Bhadrak and Jajpur districts, Odisha – 3–5 July 2005 –

2009

- Coromandel Express derailment.
- Odisha Floods – Oct 2009 - Relief and rescue .

2011

- Flood in Jajpur district, Odisha – Sep 2011 –

2013

- Cyclone Phailin – evacuated about one million people

2014

- Cyclone Hudhud – sent disaster response teams to help with post cyclone reconstruction

2015

- Nepal Earthquake - sent to help local authorities in relief and restoration operations.

2018

- Cyclone Titli – evacuated about 300,000 people to cyclone shelters.

2019

- Cyclone Fani – evacuated about 1.2 million people to nearly 4000 cyclone shelters.

2020

- Cyclone Amphan - About 658,000 people were evacuated.

== See also ==
- National Disaster Response Force
- National Disaster Management Authority (India)
- Odisha Disaster Rapid Action Force
