= Gandala =

Gandala could refer to one of the following places in India:

- Gandala, Rajasthan
- Gandala, Odisha
