= Odisha Disaster Rapid Action Force =

Disaster response unit in Odisha, India

Agency overview
- Formed: 2001; 25 years ago
- Jurisdiction: Government of Odisha
- Minister responsible: Mohan Majhi, Chief Minister

The Odisha Disaster Rapid Action Force (ODRAF) is a specialised unit of Odisha Police constituted "To act immediately in case of disaster which may be due to natural calamity or industrial accident" by a state home department resolution.

== Composition ==
Odisha Disaster Rapid Action Force (ODRAF) is a force of 10 units. The manpower is derived from Odisha State Armed Police(OSAP) and Armed police Reserve(APR). They have been equipped with the necessary equipments such as cranes, generators, troop carriers, trucks, concrete cutting equipments etc. The ODRAF units can additionally use the requisite tools available with Govt. / Public Sector and private agencies for their operations.

== Deployment ==
These ODRAF units are located at twenty locations in the state based to cut down the response time for their deployment. These locations were chosen according to their vulnerability profile.

S. No.	ODRAF Unit Location	Parent Battalion
1	Cuttack	OSAP 6th Battalion
2	Koraput	OSAP 3rd Battalion
3	Jharsuguda	OSAP 2nd Battalion
4	Chhatrapur	OSAP 8th Battalion
5	Balasore	Armed Police Reserve
6	Bhubaneswar	OSAP 7th Battalion
7	Paradeep	Armed Police Reserve
8	Rourkela	OSAP 4th Battalion
9	Baripada	OSAP 5th Battalion
10	Bolangir	Armed Police Reserve
11	Dhenkanal	OSAP 1st Bn., Dhenkanal
12	Koraput	1st India Reserve Battalion, Upper Kolab
13	Rayagada	2nd India Reserve Battalion, Rayagda
11	Jajpur	3rd India Reserve Battalion, Kalinganagar
14	Deogarh	4th India Reserve Battalion, Deogarh.
15	Boudh	5th India Reserve Battalion, Boudh.
16	Khordha	6th India Reserve Battalion, Khordha.
17	Koraput	7th Specialized India Reserve Battalion, Upper Kolab.
18	Ganjam	8th Specialized India Reserve Battalion, Bhanjanagar.
19	Ganjam	OSAP 8th Bn., Chhatrapur.
20	Kandhamal	8th Specialized India Reserve Battalion

== Functional parameters ==
The aim of the ODRAF is to immediately respond to disaster which may be either due to natural calamity or industrial accidents. The units are trained in relevant response techniques and to act immediately. The forces are deployed on intimation of a disaster or warning of forthcoming disaster. The units mobilise at the request of Special Relief Commissioner/Orissa State Disaster Mitigation Authority (OSDMA)/ District Collector. Once deployed they remain under the command of the Superintendent of police of that district.

== Disaster response ==
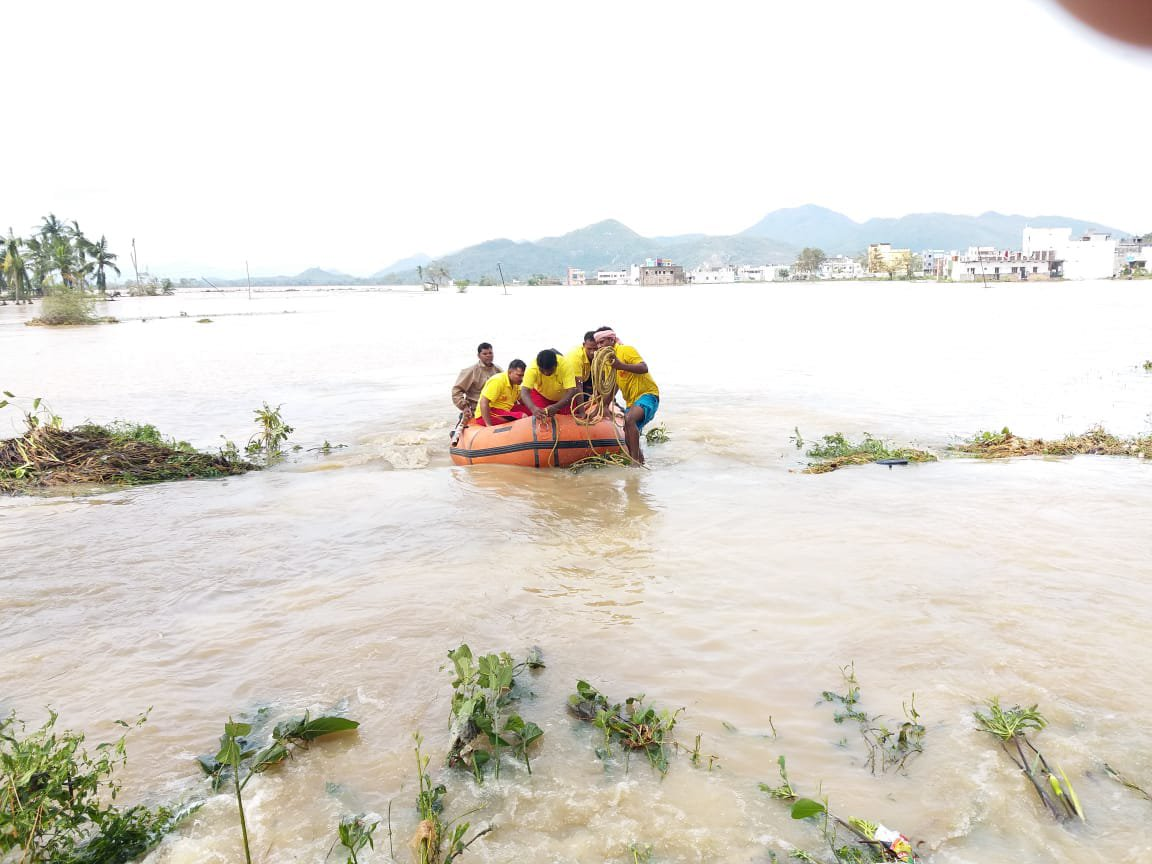
Rescue work in Mahendratanya river in Gajapati.

ODRAF has proved its usefulness with its commendable performance during various disasters including the boat capsizing, devastating floods and Cyclones. Some of the major response operations of NDRF as below:

2005

- Flood in Bhadrak and Jajpur districts, Odisha – 3–5 July 2005 –

2009

- Coromandel Express derailment.
- Odisha Floods – Oct 2009 - Relief and rescue.

2011

- Flood in Jajpur district, Odisha – Sep 2011 –

2013

- Cyclone Phailin - Post cyclone relief and rescue operation.

2014

- Hirakud Boat Capsizing incident - Feb 2014 .
- Flood in coastal districts,
- Cyclone Hudhud - Post cyclone relief and restoration

2015

- Flood in Odisha, August - relief and rescue operation

2016

- Deogarh Bus accident relief and rescue operation
- Bhubaneswar SUM hospital fire - Coordination of patient movement
- Chilika Boat capsize Incident - Rescue operation

2019

- Cyclone Fani relief and rescue.

2020

- Cyclone Amphan relief and rescue

=== 2021 ===
==== Elephant rescue incident ====
On 24 September 2021, an Odisha TV journalist died while another was critically injured when the boat they were travelling to cover the elephant rescue overturned due to the river current. An ODRAF personnel also died in the incident. The elephant rescue operation was put on hold after the boat overturned. The elephant was eventually found dead after he unable to cross the river.

== Training ==
The ODRAF personnel have undergone training on rescue equipment operations and maintenance. In addition they have been trained ate following specialised training.

- Flood Relief & Rescue Operation Training at Mukam Ghat, CRPF Training Centre, Bihar.
- Under Water Diving Course and Salvage Operation at S.E.I., Kolkata
- Basic Mountaineering Course at A.B.V.I., Monali, Himachal Pradesh.
- T.O.T. on Disaster Management at C.I.S.F., NISA, Hyderabad.
- Disaster Management Training at N.C.D.C., Nagpur.
- T.O.T. Course on M.F. & C.S.S.R. at CRPF Training Centre, Coimbatore, Tamil Nadu.
- Flood Rescue Course at N.D.R.F., Bn., Mundali, Cuttack.
- Rescue & Relief Operation at I.N.S., Chilika

== See also ==
- Odisha Police
- National Disaster Response Force
- State Disaster Response Force, Assam
