= 2014 Nepal snowstorm disaster =

Fatal natural disaster

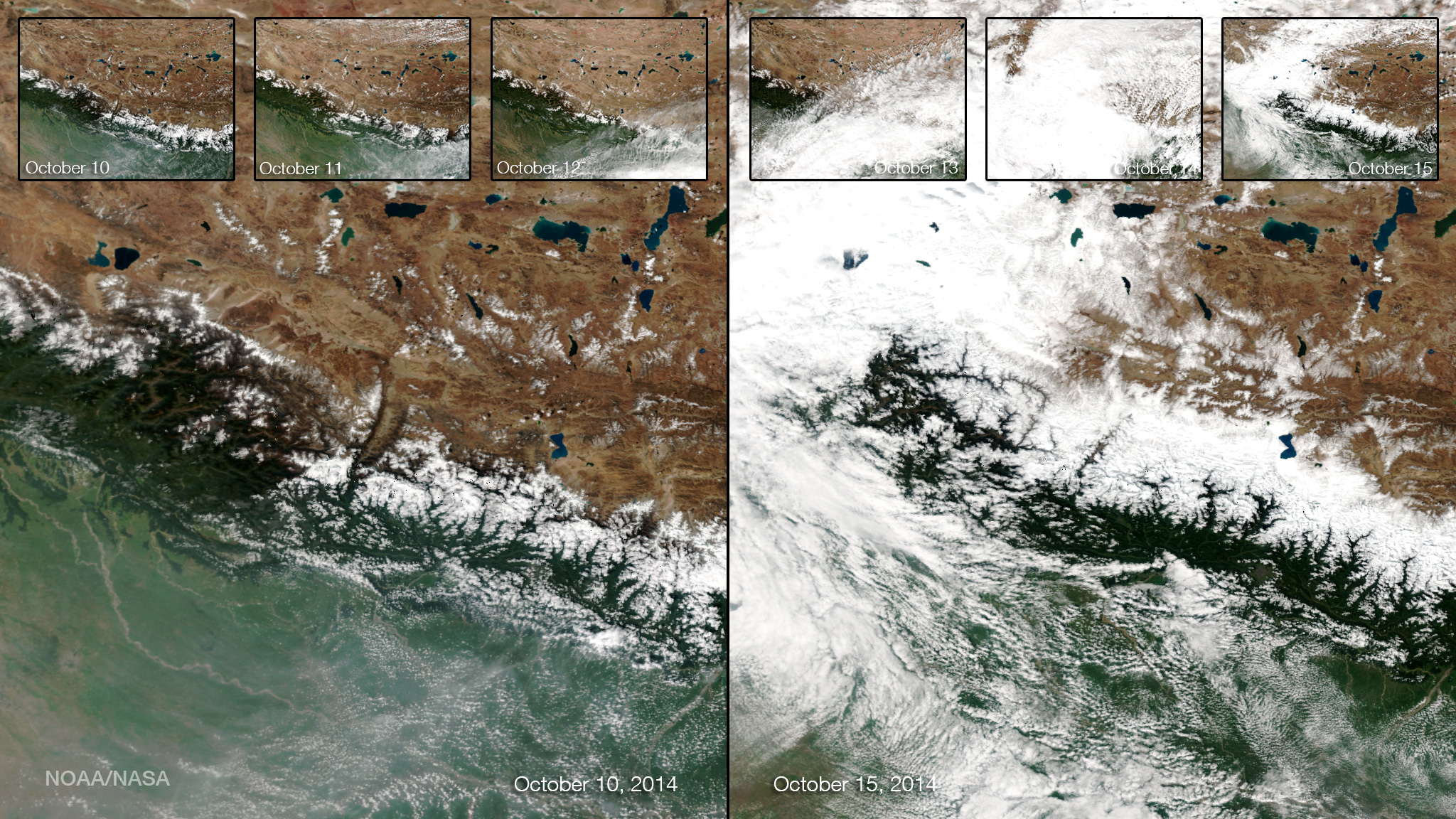
- Satellite imagery shows a progression of snow cover from 10 to 15 October
- Native name: विसं २०७१ को हिमआँधी प्रकोप
- Date: 14 October 2014
- Location: Manang and Mustang Districts, Nepal
- Cause: Cyclone Hudhud
- Deaths: 43 deaths
- Injuries: 175
- Missing: 50

The 2014 Nepal snowstorm disaster occurred in central Nepal on 14 October 2014 and resulted in the deaths of at least 43 people of various nationalities, including at least 21 trekkers. Injuries and fatalities resulted from unusually severe snowstorms and avalanches on and around the mountains of Annapurna and Dhaulagiri. The incident was said to be Nepal's worst trekking disaster.

== Events ==
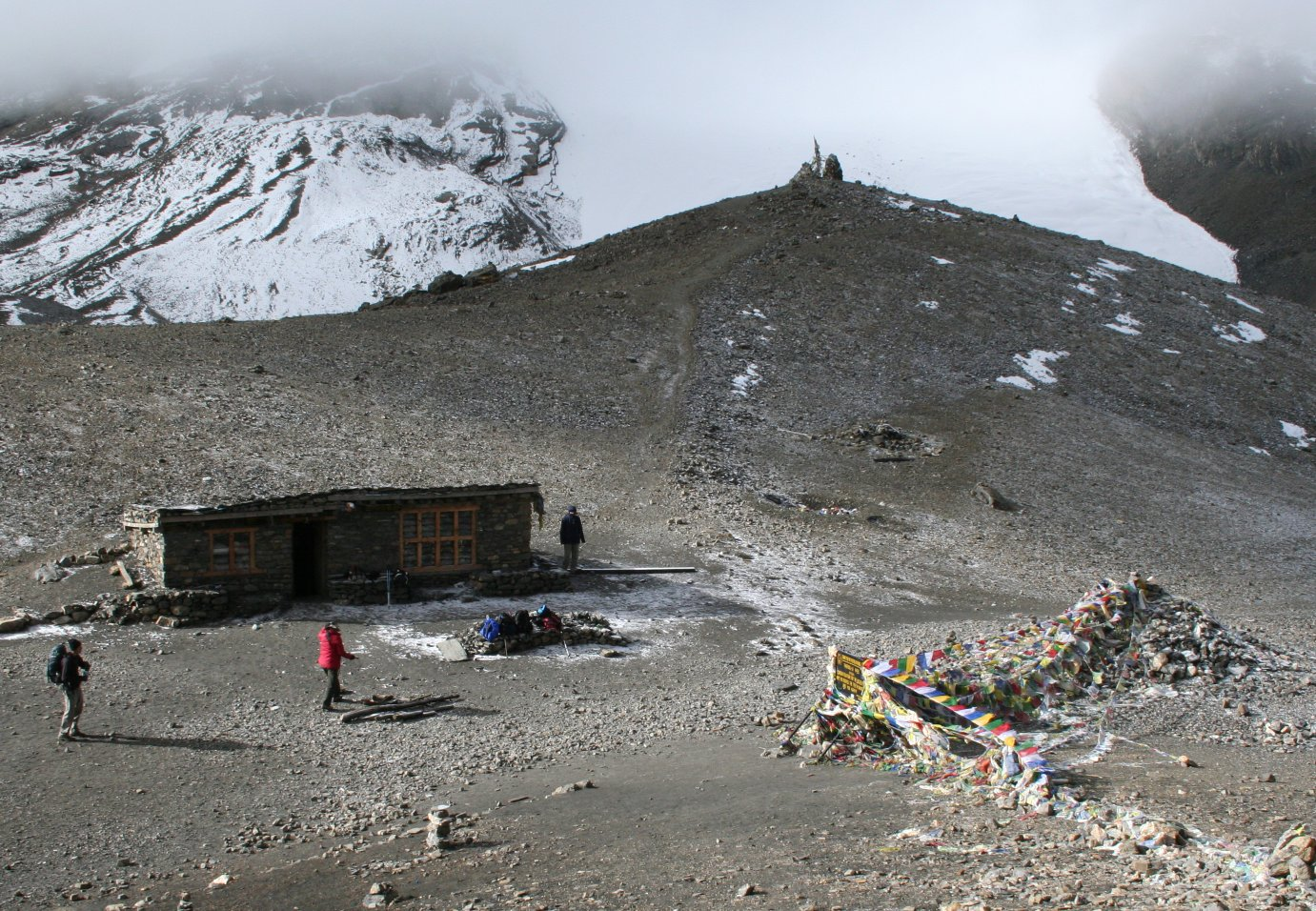
Thorong La Pass in 2006.

On 14 October 2014, a snowstorm and series of avalanches occurred on and around Annapurna and Dhaulagiri in the Manang and Mustang Districts of Nepal within the Himalaya range. According to an unnamed expert the storm arose from Cyclone Hudhud and was the worst in a decade with almost 1.8 metres (5 ft 11 in) of snow falling within 12 hours. The storm resulted from the unusual merger of a tropical cyclone with an upper trough.

Electric power, cell phone service, and internet connections failed in the Manang District, hampering relief efforts. Trekkers in the area at the time of the storm consisted of citizens from several countries, including 78 from New Zealand. One of the first calls for international assistance was raised by the Israeli embassy in Kathmandu after trapped tourists sent a hand-written note from the top of the pass with a local guide who descended the mountain. Twenty-one trekkers and guides from Nepal, Slovakia, and Germany were rescued on 15 October after the avalanche the previous day. When search and rescue operations ceased on 19 October, 407 people, including 226 foreigners, had been rescued. People were recovered from areas including Thorong La, the Manang and Mustang areas, and the Tukuche basecamp of Mustang.

The storms resulted in the deaths of at least 43 people. Among the dead were 21 trekkers from several countries walking the Annapurna Circuit, including two Slovak climbers at Dhaulagiri base camp, and several local Nepali mountain guides, cooks, and yak herders. Up to 50 people were estimated to be missing with 175 reported to have injuries such as severe frostbite.

== Legacy ==
Local authorities were criticised for not giving sufficient warning of approaching bad weather to the trekkers and local residents. However, some officials believe that those killed or injured were inexperienced and inadequately equipped. The Prime Minister of Nepal Sushil Koirala called the loss of life “extremely tragic at a time when worldwide weather updates are available every second”, and said that weather warning systems would be improved. The Nepal Tourism Ministry said that the incident "has taught us a lesson”, and that more emergency shelters and better weather tracking and communication were needed to avert future tragedies. Newly proposed procedures and regulations include a trekker registry, checkpoints, GPS tracking units and mandatory use of trained local guides. However, regulations at the time required trekkers to check in at various waypoints and licensed guides were already recommended. There was no system in place at the time to inform trekkers of weather conditions en route.

== See also ==
- 2025 Nepal snowstorm disaster
- List of avalanches
- List of mountaineering disasters by death toll
