= Gandala, Odisha =

Gandala
- Village
- Location in Odisha, India Gandala (India)
- Coordinates: 19.32°N 84.78°E
- Country: India
- State: Odisha
- District: Ganjam
- Elevation: 28 m (92 ft)

Population (2012)
  - Total: 8,389

Languages
  - Official: Oriya
- Time zone: UTC+5:30 (IST)
- PIN: 761 003
- Telephone code: 06811-
- Vehicle registration: OD
- Website: odisha.gov.in

Gandala is a small village located on the eastern coastline of Ganjam District in the Indian state of Odisha. Gandala is a panchayat under the block of Hinjilicut near to Berhampur City. The majority of the village population is dependent on farming. Gandala has an average elevation of 28 m (92 ft).

== Demographics ==
According to a 2013 report on world Gazetter India census, Gandala-Belagan had a population of 8389 which is more than Gopalpur port town. Gandala is a Panchayat (with one village) & Belagan also a Panchayat (with one village). Both the villages are merged about 30 years back like Hinjili and katu.

- Gandala: In 2011 – 4652, and in 2013 – 5199
- Belagan: In 2011 – 3154, and in 2013 – 3190

== Health care ==
- Veterinary Hospital in Gondala, Ganjam

== Bank and Post Office ==
- UNITED BANK OF INDIA(IFSC-UTBI0GNB475) GANDALA-BELGAON
- DHANEI KGFS GANDALA PRIVATE
- Head Post Office Gandala

== Education ==
- Primary School Near main Market
- Primary School in bandha sahi
- Saraswati Sisu Mandira
- Ganesh Vidya Peeth (established 1959)
- Sri Beleswar (Junior) Mahavidyalaya, Gandala (established 1993)
- Sri Beleswar Degree Mahavidyalaya, Gandala (established 1997)
