= Cyclone Fani =

North Indian Ocean cyclone in 2019

Extremely Severe Cyclonic Storm Fani
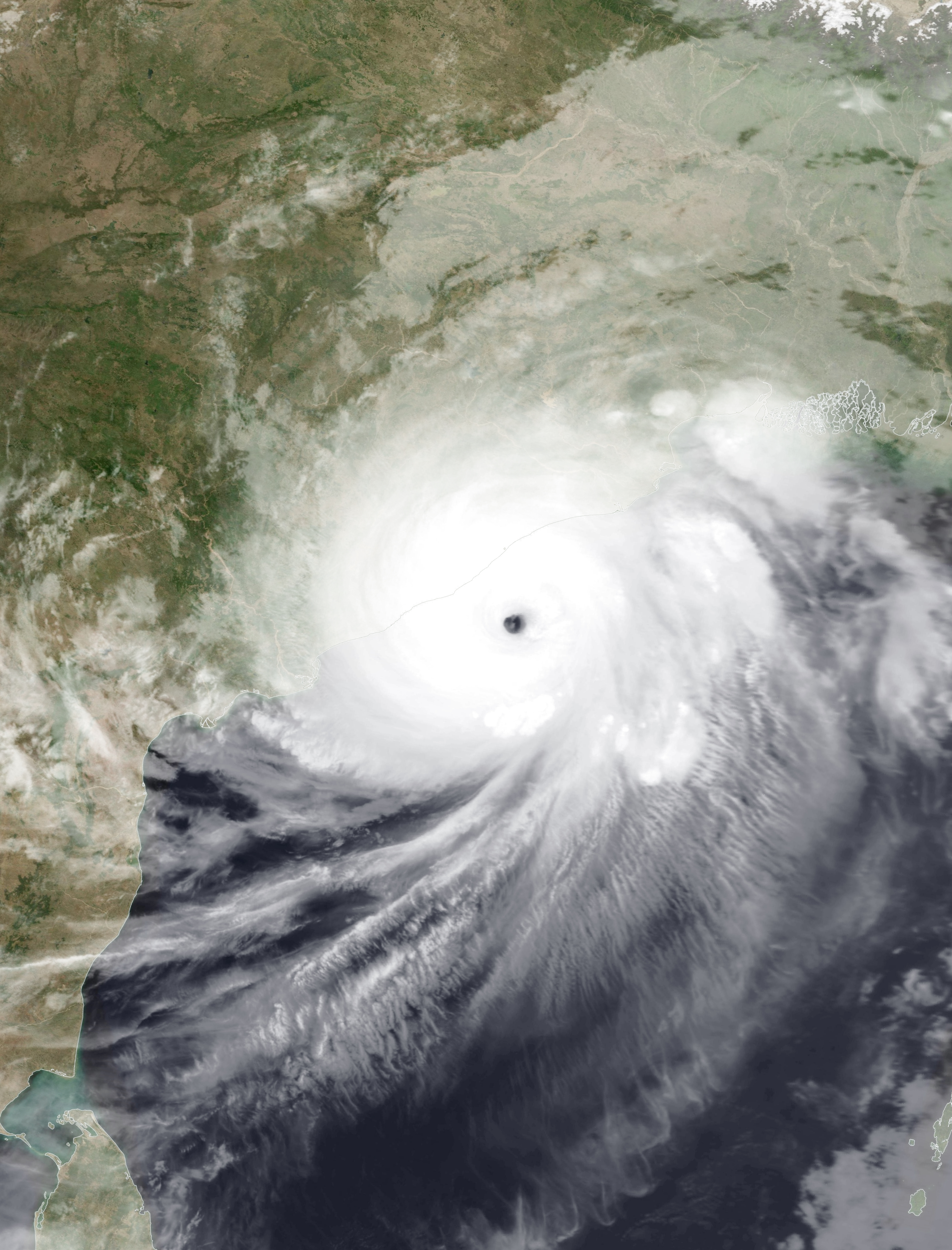
- Cyclone Fani at peak intensity on 2 May, while approaching Odisha

Meteorological history
- Formed: 26 April 2019
- Remnant low: 4 May 2019
- Dissipated: 5 May 2019

Extremely severe cyclonic storm
- 3-minute sustained (IMD)
- Highest winds: 215 km/h (130 mph)
- Lowest pressure: 932 hPa (mbar); 27.52 inHg

Category 5-equivalent tropical cyclone
- 1-minute sustained (SSHWS/JTWC)
- Highest winds: 280 km/h (175 mph)
- Lowest pressure: 900 hPa (mbar); 26.58 inHg

Overall effects
- Fatalities: 81 total
- Damage: $8.1 billion (2019 USD)
- Areas affected: Odisha; West Bengal; Andhra Pradesh; East India; Bangladesh; Bhutan; Sri Lanka
- IBTrACS
- Part of the 2019 North Indian Ocean cyclone season

Extremely Severe Cyclonic Storm Fani (Note: The name Fani (Bengali: ফণী; [fɔniˑ]) was contributed by Bangladesh and means "serpent, hooded snake" in Bengali.) was the strongest pre-monsoon tropical cyclone to form in the Bay of Bengal since 1991. The second named storm and the first severe cyclonic storm of the 2019 North Indian Ocean cyclone season, Fani originated from a tropical depression that formed west of Sumatra in the Indian Ocean on 26 April. Vertical wind shear initially hindered the storm's development, but conditions became more favorable for Fani on 30 April. Fani rapidly intensified as a result, peaking as an extremely severe cyclonic storm with 3-minute sustained winds of 215 km/h (130 mph). The Joint Typhoon Warning Center (JTWC) assessed its peak as a Category 5-equivalent tropical cyclone with 1-minute sustained winds of 280 km/h (175 mph), making it the strongest north Indian Ocean tropical cyclone on record in terms of 1-minute sustained winds. Fani weakened slightly before making landfall in Odisha a few days later. Its convective structure rapidly degraded thereafter, degenerating into a remnant low on 4 May, and dissipating on the next day.

Prior to Fani's landfall, authorities in India and Bangladesh moved at least a million people each from areas within Fani's projected path onto higher ground and into cyclone shelters, which is thought to have reduced the death toll. Fani killed at least 81 people in eastern India and Bangladesh and caused about US$8.1 billion worth of damage in both India and Bangladesh, mostly in Odisha, in India.

== Meteorological history ==
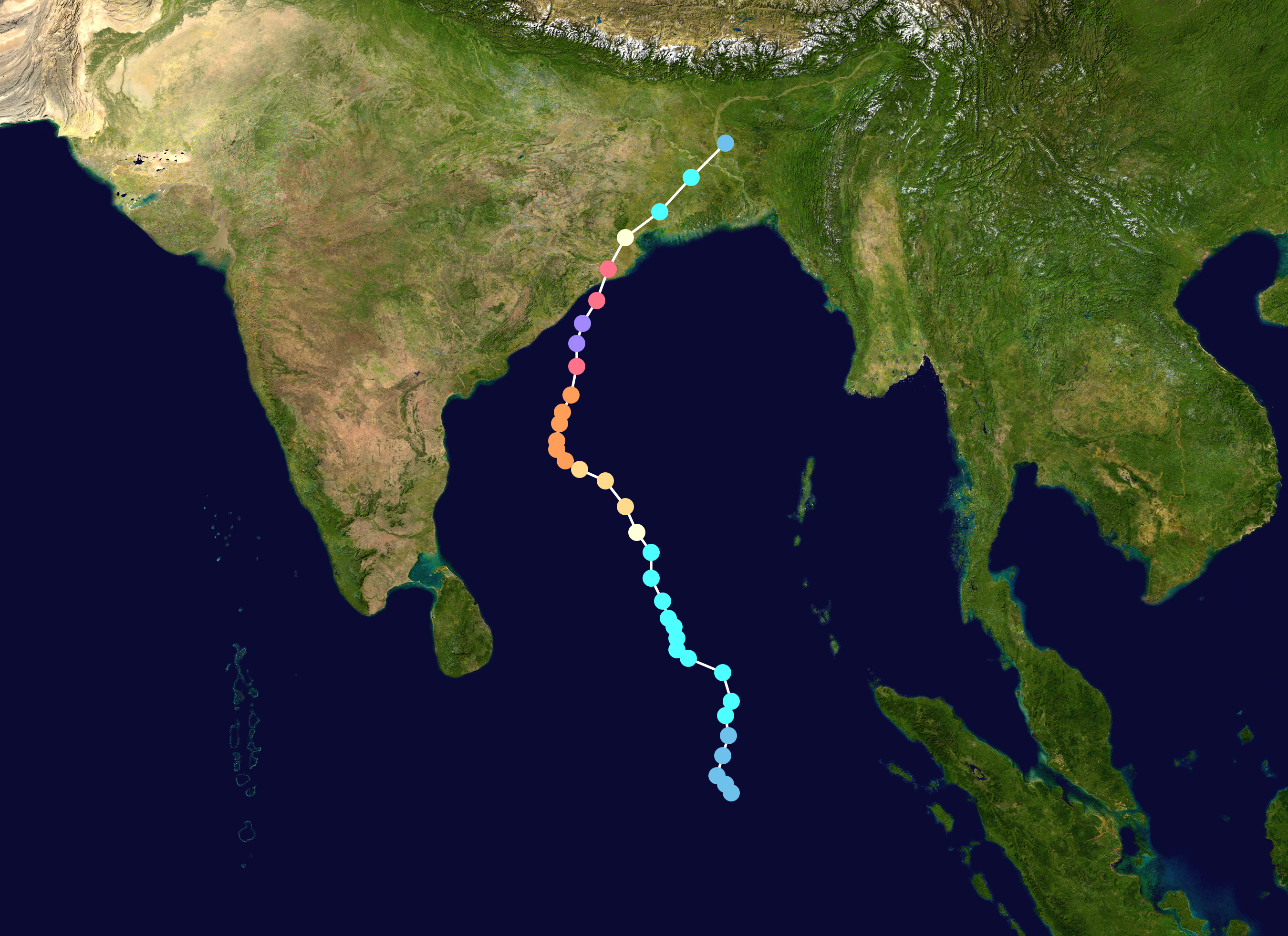
Map plotting the storm's track and intensity, according to the Saffir–Simpson scale Map key Saffir–Simpson scale Tropical depression (≤38 mph, ≤62 km/h) Tropical storm (39–73 mph, 63–118 km/h) Category 1 (74–95 mph, 119–153 km/h) Category 2 (96–110 mph, 154–177 km/h) Category 3 (111–129 mph, 178–208 km/h) Category 4 (130–156 mph, 209–251 km/h) Category 5 (≥157 mph, ≥252 km/h) Unknown Storm type Tropical cyclone Subtropical cyclone Extratropical cyclone, remnant low, tropical disturbance, or monsoon depression

On 26 April, the India Meteorological Department (IMD) began tracking a depression located to the west of Sumatra, designating it as BOB 02, meaning the second depression of 2019 formed in the Bay of Bengal, the first being Tropical Storm Pabuk earlier that year. Later that day, the Joint Typhoon Warning Center (JTWC) issued a Tropical Cyclone Formation Alert on the system. Afterward, the storm slowly coalesced while moving northward, and was upgraded to a deep depression at 03:00 UTC on 27 April. At the same time, the JTWC began warning on the system, designating it 01B. Six hours later, the IMD upgraded the system to a cyclonic storm and gave it the name Fani.

The system continued to intensify until 18:00 UTC on 27 April, after which it stagnated for over a day while continuing to move northwest. On 29 April, Fani resumed strengthening around 12:00 UTC, with the IMD upgrading it to a severe cyclonic storm. At that time, Fani began a period of rapid intensification as it was located within a very favorable environment with sea surface temperatures of 30–31 °C (86–88 °F) and low vertical wind shear. As a result, the JTWC upgraded Fani to a Category 1-equivalent cyclone late on 29 April. Around 00:00 UTC on 30 April, Fani was upgraded to a very severe cyclonic storm by the IMD. The organization of the system continued to improve, with tight spiral banding wrapping into a formative eye feature, resulting in Fani being upgraded to an extremely severe cyclonic storm by the IMD around 12:00 UTC, while the JTWC upgraded the storm to a Category 3-equivalent cyclone hours later. On 2 May, the central dense overcast became more symmetrical and the eye more distinct, and Fani was upgraded to a Category 4-equivalent cyclone by the JTWC at 06:00 UTC. Shortly after, Fani started another period of rapid intensification, attaining 1-minute sustained winds of 280 km/h (175 mph) according to the JTWC. It became the strongest pre-monsoon cyclone in the Bay of Bengal since 1991. Operationally, the JTWC classified the system as a high-end Category 4-equivalent tropical cyclone with 1-minute sustained winds of 250 km/h (155 mph), but raised their estimate in post-season re-analysis.

Fani quickly weakened after peak intensity. In the morning of 3 May, Fani made landfall near Puri, Odisha as an extremely severe cyclonic storm with 3-minute sustained winds of 185 km/h (115 mph) and 1-minute sustained winds of 230 km/h (145 mph) according to IBTrACS, a dataset of best tracks. This made Fani the most intense storm to make landfall in India's Odisha state since the 1999 Odisha cyclone. Land interaction quickly degraded Fani's convective structure and it weakened to a Category 1-equivalent tropical cyclone soon after landfall. Fani continued to weaken after landfall, weakening to a cyclonic storm later that day, before passing just north of Kolkata. On 4 May, Fani weakened to a deep depression and moved into Bangladesh, before degenerating into a well-marked low later on the same day. Fani's remnant low dissipated over Myanmar the next day.

=== Relation to climate change ===
Fani underwent rapid intensification as it tracked northward over the Bay of Bengal, where local sea surface temperatures were 2.5 °C (4.5 °F) above normal. A convection‑permitting attribution study with WRF‑Chem found that removing post‑1990 warming trends in both the atmosphere and ocean reduced Fani's five‑day precipitation totals by around 51%, with tropospheric warming contributing roughly two‑thirds of this reduction and sea surface warming roughly one‑third.

Fani has been part of a recent trend of cyclones forming at unusual times of year. Between 1891 and 2019, Fani is one of only 15 severe cyclones to form in April, with only one other storm also crossing the Indian mainland.

== Preparations ==
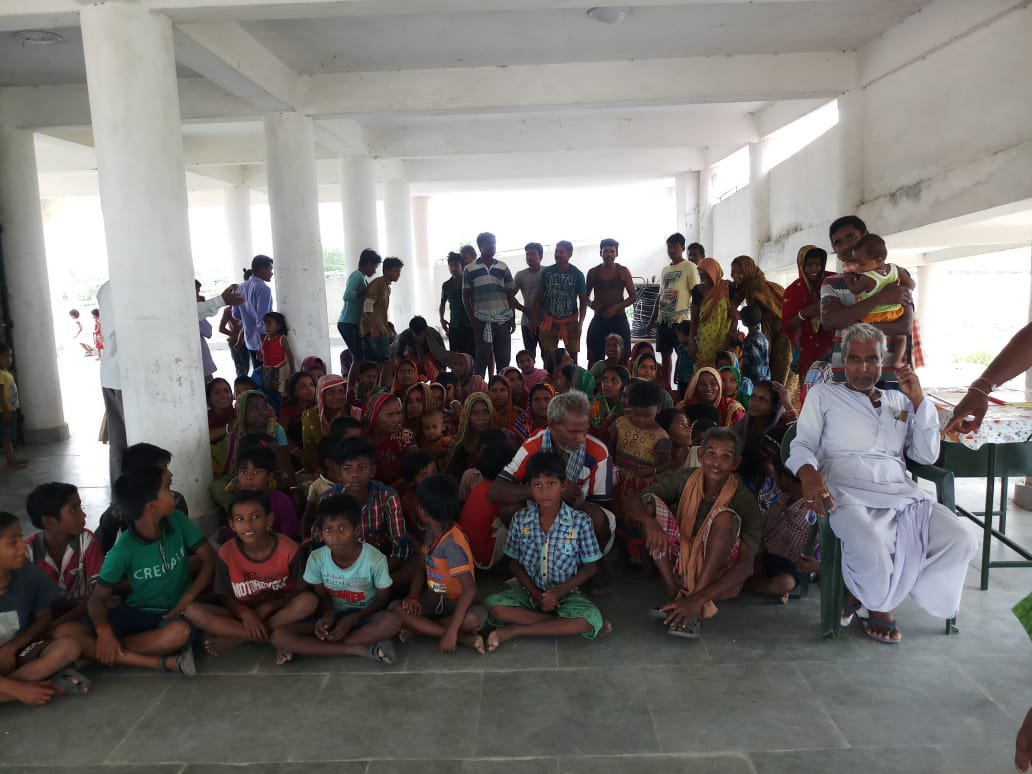
Evacuees at a cyclone shelter at Basudevpur, Bhadrak district

A cyclone watch was issued for Odisha and parts of Andhra Pradesh on 29 April, which was extended to West Bengal the following day. Sixty-six hours prior to landfall this was upgraded to a cyclone alert, and 36 hours prior to landfall the alert was upgraded to a cyclone warning. The state government of Odisha and the Odisha State Disaster Management Authority evacuated over 1.2 million residents from vulnerable coastal areas and moved them to higher ground and into cyclone shelters built a few kilometres inland. The authorities deployed around a thousand emergency workers and 43,000 volunteers in these efforts. It sent out 2.6 million text messages to warn of the storm in addition to using television, sirens and public-address systems to communicate the message. About 7,000 kitchens were operated to feed evacuees in 9,000 storm shelters. These measures may have reduced the possible death toll, as thousands died in the similar 1999 Odisha cyclone compared to the 20 fatalities from Fani.

The Indian Navy readied naval ships and aircraft at Arakkonam and Visakhapatnam air-bases to prepare for the storm's aftermath and aid in reconnaissance, rescue and relief operations. The Odisha government staged 300 motorboats, two helicopters, and several chainsaws to clear fallen trees. Authorities in Bangladesh were ordered to open shelter areas in 19 coastal districts. The Bangladesh Navy deployed 32 naval ships to provide emergency relief and medical assistance to the coastal areas in case of any emergencies. More than 1.2 million people were evacuated in Bangladesh to cyclone shelters in coastal areas.

== Impacts and aftermath ==
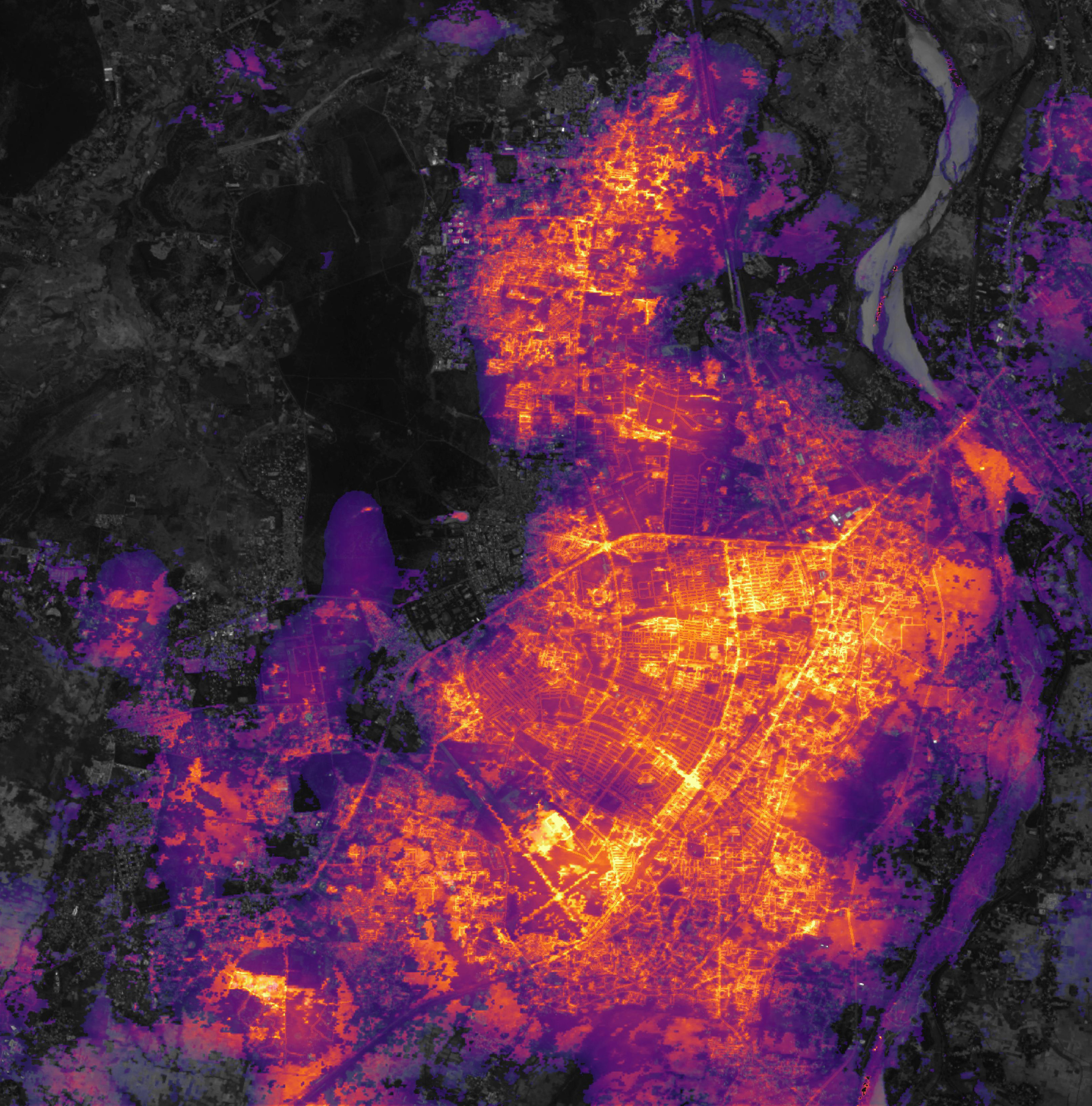
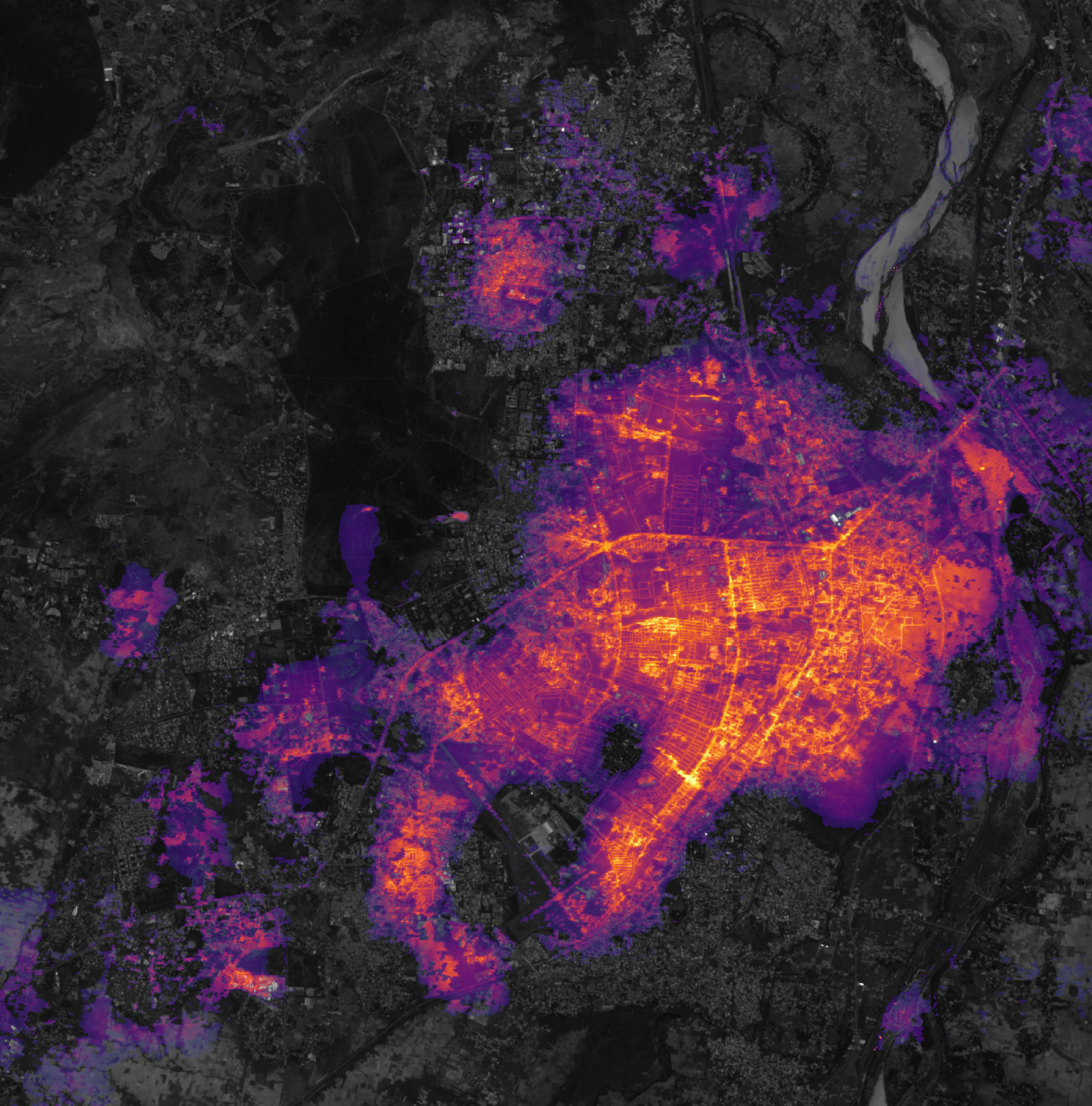
Building lights in Bhubaneswar, Odisha, before and after Cyclone Fani

Costliest known North Indian cyclones (adjusted for inflation)
| Rank | Cyclone | Season | Damage (2025 USD) |
|---|---|---|---|
| 1 | ESCS Nargis | 2008 | $22.9 billion |
| 2 | CS Senyar | 2025 | $20.1 billion |
| 3 | SuCS Amphan | 2020 | $19.3 billion |
| 4 | ESCS Hudhud | 2014 | $15 billion |
| 5 | ESCS Fani | 2019 | $10.2 billion |
| 6 | SuCS BOB 06 | 1999 | $8.58 billion |
| 7 | SuCS Gonu | 2007 | $6.86 billion |
| 8 | ESCS ARB 02 | 1998 | $5.93 billion |
| 9 | ESCS Phailin | 2013 | $5.89 billion |
| 10 | VSCS Vardah | 2016 | $4.53 billion |

An estimated 10 million people were affected by Fani. In Bhubaneswar, around half of the city's roughly 450,000 electricity customers were still without power several days after landfall. In addition to electrical shortages, multiple districts, such as Puri and Bhubaneswar, sustained significant damage to water infrastructure, leaving many residents without access to water for days.

=== India ===
==== Odisha ====
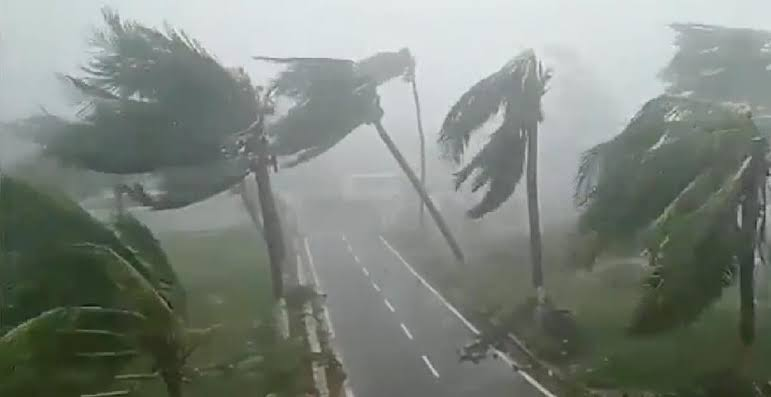
Trees in Odisha experiencing heavy winds during Cyclone Fani

A total of 64 people were killed in Odisha, and over 350,000 homes were damaged. The cyclone adversely affected electricity supply and telecommunication in several coastal areas of Odisha Puri and Khordha district in Odisha were the worst hit, with Puri's telecommunications network being completely destroyed. The Jagannath Temple in Puri suffered minor damage to its electrical and civil infrastructure, with the repair cost estimated at ₹51 million (US$738,000). The KIIT University also suffered damage of about ₹300 million (US$4.3 million). Berhampur recorded Odisha's highest rainfall total, at 30 cm (12 in) in the 24 hours ending at 03:00 UTC on 3 May. The total damage in Odisha was estimated at ₹120 billion (US$1.74 billion). After the cyclone, Odisha requested ₹170 billion (US$2.46 billion) for rebuilding infrastructure. Indian Prime Minister Narendra Modi announced that the government had released over ₹10 billion (US$145 million) for the states affected by Fani. The only water source for much of Odisha was bottled water, which rose several times in price due to demand, going from ₹200 to ₹1,000−1,500 in Bhubaneswar.

==== Elsewhere ====
In Andhra Pradesh, around 2,000 electricity poles were uprooted and over a dozen livestock were killed. Although no fatalities occurred in the state, Srikakulam and Vizianagaram districts reported an economic loss of ₹586.2 million (US$8.5 million), with the Panchayat Raj (₹20 crore) and Roads and Buildings (₹21 crore) departments suffering the most damage. 216 hectares (530 acres) of paddy crop and 229 hectares (570 acres) of banana crop were also damaged, and 17,460 people were relocated to relief camps. The South Central Railway also suffered lost revenue of around ₹29.8 million (US$432,000) after cancelling 120 trains and refunding over 40,000 passengers. Damage in West Bengal was minimal according to its chief of state, Mamata Banerjee. In Meghalaya, Sohra recorded the highest rainfall total associated with Fani, with 41 cm (16 in) in the 24 hours ending at 03:00 UTC on 5 May. The cyclone caused a storm surge of about 1.5 m (59 in) at landfall.

=== Bangladesh ===
In Bangladesh, Fani killed 17 people across 10 districts. In Bagerhat District, a woman died after being hit by a falling tree, while 8 others were killed by lightning strikes in three separate districts. The cyclone also caused damage to over 13,000 homes, with 2,200 of those being completely destroyed. In addition, 53,000 ha (130,000 acres) of farmland in 35 districts of the country were either partly or fully destroyed. Fani caused approximately ৳536 crore (US$63.6 million) in damage in Bangladesh, including an agricultural loss of ৳38.5 crore (US$4.6 million).

== See also ==
- 1999 Odisha cyclone – The strongest cyclone on record to strike Odisha; also the most intense storm recorded in the North Indian Ocean, which killed an estimated 10,000 people.
- Cyclone Viyaru – Took a similar path and affected Bangladesh and Myanmar in 2013
- Cyclone Phailin – A powerful tropical cyclone that struck Odisha in 2013, which displaced over 1 million people
- Tropical Storm Matmo and Cyclone Bulbul (2019)
- Cyclone Amphan – A powerful Super Cyclonic Storm that affected similar areas in 2020
- List of tropical cyclones near the Equator
