= Gandala, Rajasthan =

Gandala Chak Muradpur/Jamalpur kheda
- Up-Tahsil | Rural
- Gandala
- Location within Rajasthan
- Coordinates: 27°58′N 76°18′E
- Country: India
- State: Rajasthan
- District: Alwar
- Tehsil/Sub-district: Behror

Government
  - Type: Gram Panchayat
  - Body: Gram Panchayat Gandala Gram
  - Sarpanch: Smt. Tarawati devi

Area
  - Up-Tahsil: 857.0 ha (2,118 acres)
  - Gram Panchayat: 1,288.0 ha (3,183 acres)

Population
  - Total: 6,537 ( Census 2,011)
- Time zone: Indian Standard Time
- PIN: 301709

Gandala is a Gram Panchayat Village and Up-Tehsil in Behror tahsil/Sub-district, Alwar, Rajasthan, India. It is the second largest Village by population in Behror Tehsil after Bardod Village according to 2011 Census of India and situated on Behror-Kund Road ( SH -111). It is 7 km from Sub-district headquarters and 70 km from District headquarters . It is 140 km from state capital and 120 km from national capital .The village is well known for its ancient temple which is named after Sati Nihali Mata. The main occupation of people in this rural area is Agriculture.The Majority population in village mainly Deeva gotra Yadavs. Part of Goad, Haryana, Narnaul, Haryana.

== Geography and demographics ==
Latitude- 27.977853, Longitude- 76.311623

The area is generally plain with few hills of Aravalli range – Khohar hills (1990 ft) of Aaravalli – to the north-west. The village sits near a mound which has not been excavated archaeologically. The area is agrarian and most common source of irrigation is ground water. The soil here is highly fertile and is of loamy type – Mattiyar and gives excellent produce only drawback being groundwater is salty and not fit for irrigation damaging soil – which needs to be left fallow. The crops sown are bajra, wheat, jowar, mustard, cotton, barley and gram. There are no perennial water channels, there were some ephemeral streams coming from Khohar hills which are now dry, non-existent or have been encroached on . Pala Pula, a dwarf ber – shrub used to grow profusely in this area which was used as an excellent source of nutrition for cattle.

Demographic Parameters of Gandala Village according to 2011 Census.
S/N	Parameters	Male	Female	Total
Castes
1.	SC	449	399	848
2.	ST	-	-	-
Education
1.	Literate	2337	1480	3817
2.	Illiterates	697	1335	2052
Occupation
I.	Workers	1669	1566	3235
A.	Main Workers	1258	770	2028
1.	Cultivators	615	632	1247
2.	Agricultural Labourers	71	71	142
3.	Household Industry Workers	32	11	43
4.	Other Workers	540	56	596
B.	Marginal Workers			

== Economy and culture ==
Agriculture is the main occupation of the villagers. Since the last decade or so Gandala has been increasingly emerging as a place noted among the surrounding villages for providing facilities for children's education, selling their produce, shopping, trade, institutional interaction, etc. Besides the Main Bazar that is just 9 km from Behror, there are a number of shop-clusters or markets specializing.

== Services ==
There are two government senior secondary schools, one primary health center and one nationalised bank - Punjab National Bank., Post Office, telephone exchange with all towers (BSNL, Idea, Vodafone, Reliance Communications, Airtel, etc.), Government Hospital, Pashu Hospital, government and private schools, main market, Atal Seva Kendra, Emitra Services, electricity (24 hours), uptehshil office, air water tank for water supply .
