= Cyclone Phailin =

North Indian Ocean cyclone in 2013

Extremely Severe Cyclonic Storm Phailin
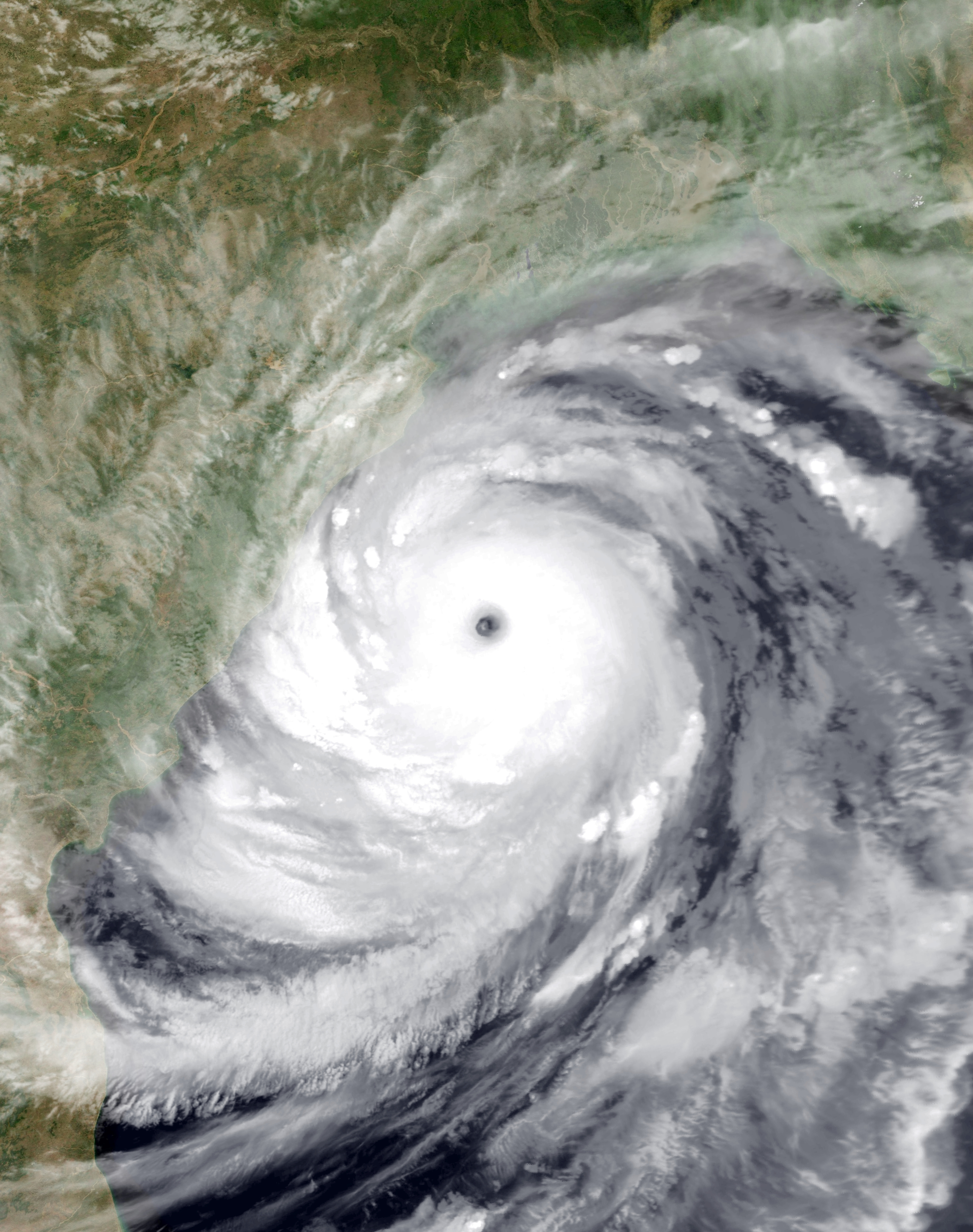
- Phailin at peak intensity near the coast of Odisha on 11 October

Meteorological history
- Formed: 4 October 2013
- Dissipated: 14 October 2013

Extremely severe cyclonic storm
- 3-minute sustained (IMD)
- Highest winds: 215 km/h (130 mph)
- Lowest pressure: 940 hPa (mbar); 27.76 inHg

Category 5-equivalent tropical cyclone
- 1-minute sustained (SSHWS/JTWC)
- Highest winds: 260 km/h (160 mph)
- Lowest pressure: 918 hPa (mbar); 27.11 inHg

Overall effects
- Fatalities: 46 total
- Damage: $4.26 billion (2013 USD)
- Areas affected: Thailand, Myanmar, India (especially Odisha), Nepal
- IBTrACS
- Part of the 2013 North Indian Ocean cyclone and Pacific typhoon seasons

Extremely Severe Cyclonic Storm Phailin (Note: The name Phailin (Thai: ไพลิน, [pʰaj˧ lin˧]) was contributed by Thailand and means "sapphire" in Thai.) was one of the most intense tropical cyclones to make landfall in India since the 1999 Odisha cyclone. The system was first noted as a tropical depression on 4 October 2013, within the Gulf of Thailand, to the west of Phnom Penh in Cambodia. Over the next few days, it moved westwards within an area of low to moderate vertical wind shear, before as it passed over the Malay Peninsula, it moved out of the Western Pacific Basin on 6 October. It emerged into the Andaman Sea during the next day and moved west-northwest into an improving environment for further development before the system was named Phailin on 9 October, after it had developed into a cyclonic storm and passed over the Andaman and Nicobar Islands into the Bay of Bengal.

During the next day, Phailin intensified rapidly and became a very severe cyclonic storm on 10 October, equivalent to a Category 1 hurricane on the Saffir–Simpson hurricane wind scale (SSHWS). On 11 October, the system became equivalent to a Category 5 hurricane on the SSHWS, before it started to weaken during the next day, as it approached the Indian state of Odisha. It made landfall later that day, near Gopalpur in Odisha coast, at around 22:30 IST (17:00 UTC) on 12 October. Phailin subsequently weakened over land (becoming a Category 1 tropical cyclone) as a result of frictional forces, before it was last noted on 14 October, as it degenerated into a well-marked area of low pressure.

Officials from Odisha's state government said that around 12 million people may be affected. The cyclone prompted India's biggest evacuation in 23 years with more than 550,000 people moved up from the coastline in Odisha and Andhra Pradesh to safer places. Total losses were estimated at ₹260 billion (US$4.26 billion) from the storm.

== Meteorological history ==
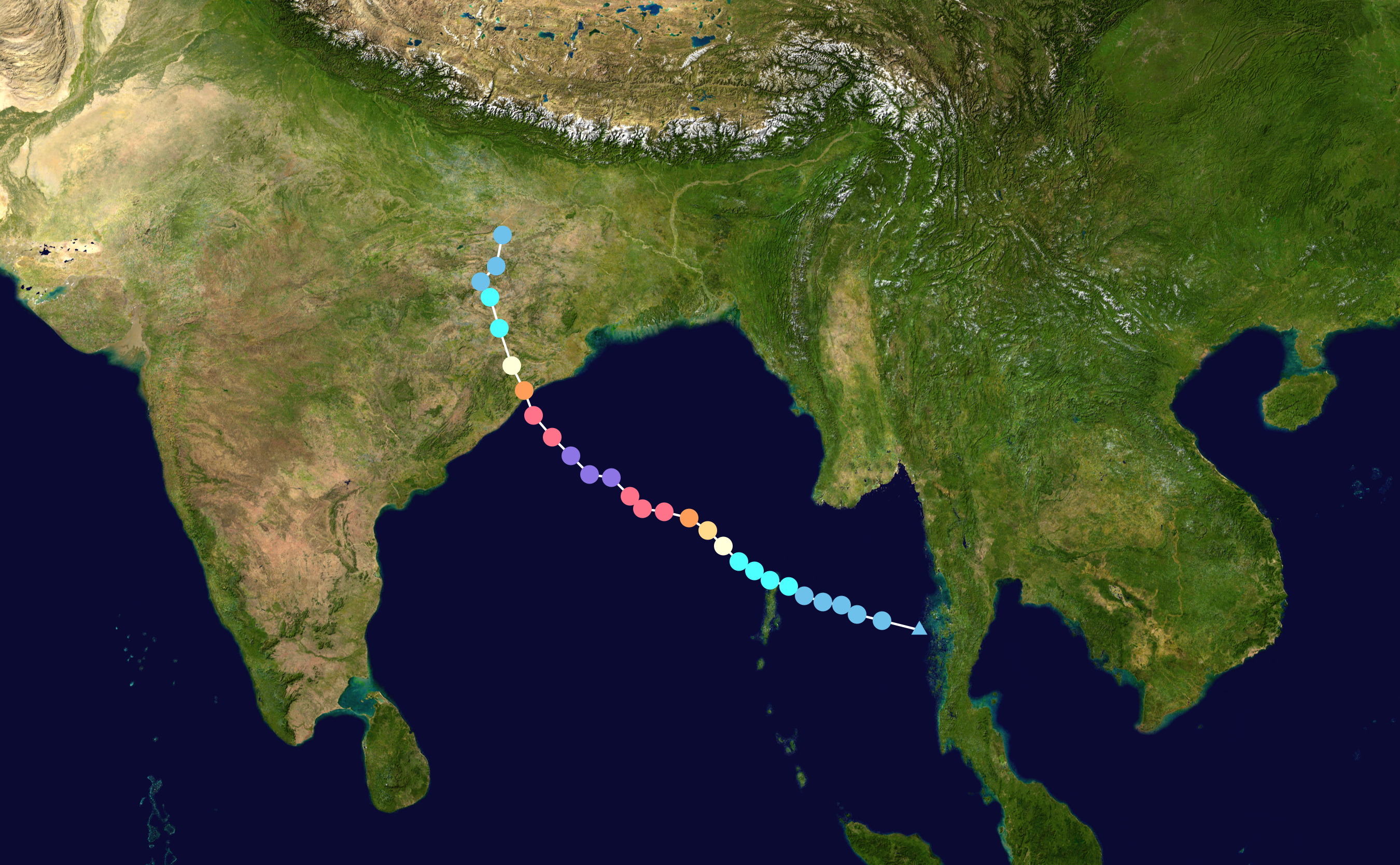
Map plotting the storm's track and intensity, according to the Saffir–Simpson scale Map key Saffir–Simpson scale Tropical depression (≤38 mph, ≤62 km/h) Tropical storm (39–73 mph, 63–118 km/h) Category 1 (74–95 mph, 119–153 km/h) Category 2 (96–110 mph, 154–177 km/h) Category 3 (111–129 mph, 178–208 km/h) Category 4 (130–156 mph, 209–251 km/h) Category 5 (≥157 mph, ≥252 km/h) Unknown Storm type Tropical cyclone Subtropical cyclone Extratropical cyclone, remnant low, tropical disturbance, or monsoon depression

On 4 October, the Japan Meteorological Agency started to monitor a tropical depression that had developed in the Gulf of Thailand, about 400 km (250 mi) west of Ho Chi Minh City in Vietnam. Over the next couple of days, the system moved westward within an area of low to moderate vertical wind shear, before it passed over the Malay Peninsula and moved out of the Western Pacific Basin on 6 October. The system then subsequently emerged into the Andaman Sea during the next day, before the India Meteorological Department (IMD) started to monitor the system as Depression BOB 04, early on 8 October. During that day, the system moved towards the west-northwest into an environment favorable for more development, before the IMD reported that the system had become a deep depression early on 9 October, as it intensified and consolidated further. The United States Joint Typhoon Warning Center (JTWC) subsequently initiated advisories on the depression and designated it as Tropical Cyclone 02B, before the system slightly weakened, as it passed near Mayabunder in the Andaman Islands and moved into the Bay of Bengal. After moving into the Bay of Bengal, the system quickly reorganized as it moved along the southern edge of a subtropical ridge of high pressure. The IMD reported that the system had intensified into a cyclonic storm and named it Phailin.

Satellite loop of Phailin making landfall on the coast of Odisha, on 12 October

After it was named, Phailin rapidly intensified further, and became the equivalent of a Category 1 hurricane on the Saffir–Simpson hurricane wind scale (SSHWS) early on 10 October. After bands of atmospheric convection had wrapped into the systems low level circulation center and formed an eye feature. Later that day, the IMD reported that the system had become a very severe cyclonic storm, before the JTWC reported that Phailin had become equivalent to a Category 4 hurricane on the SSHWS, after it had rapidly intensified throughout that day. Early the next day the system underwent an eyewall replacement cycle and formed a new eyewall which subsequently consolidated. After the new eyewall had consolidated the system slightly intensified further, with the JTWC reporting that the system had reached its peak intensity, with 1-minute sustained wind speeds of 260 km/h (160 mph) which made it equivalent to a Category 5 hurricane on the SSHWS. Early on 12 October, the system started to weaken as it underwent a second eyewall replacement cycle, before Phailin's eye started to rapidly deteriorate as it moved towards the Indian coast. The system subsequently made landfall later that day near Gopalpur in Odisha, at around 22:30 IST (17:00 UTC), near peak intensity. After the system made landfall, the JTWC issued their final advisory on Phailin; on the next day, the IMD reported that the system had weakened into a cyclonic storm. On 14 October, Phailin weakened into a well-marked low-pressure area, and the IMD issued their final advisory on the storm.

== Preparations and impact ==
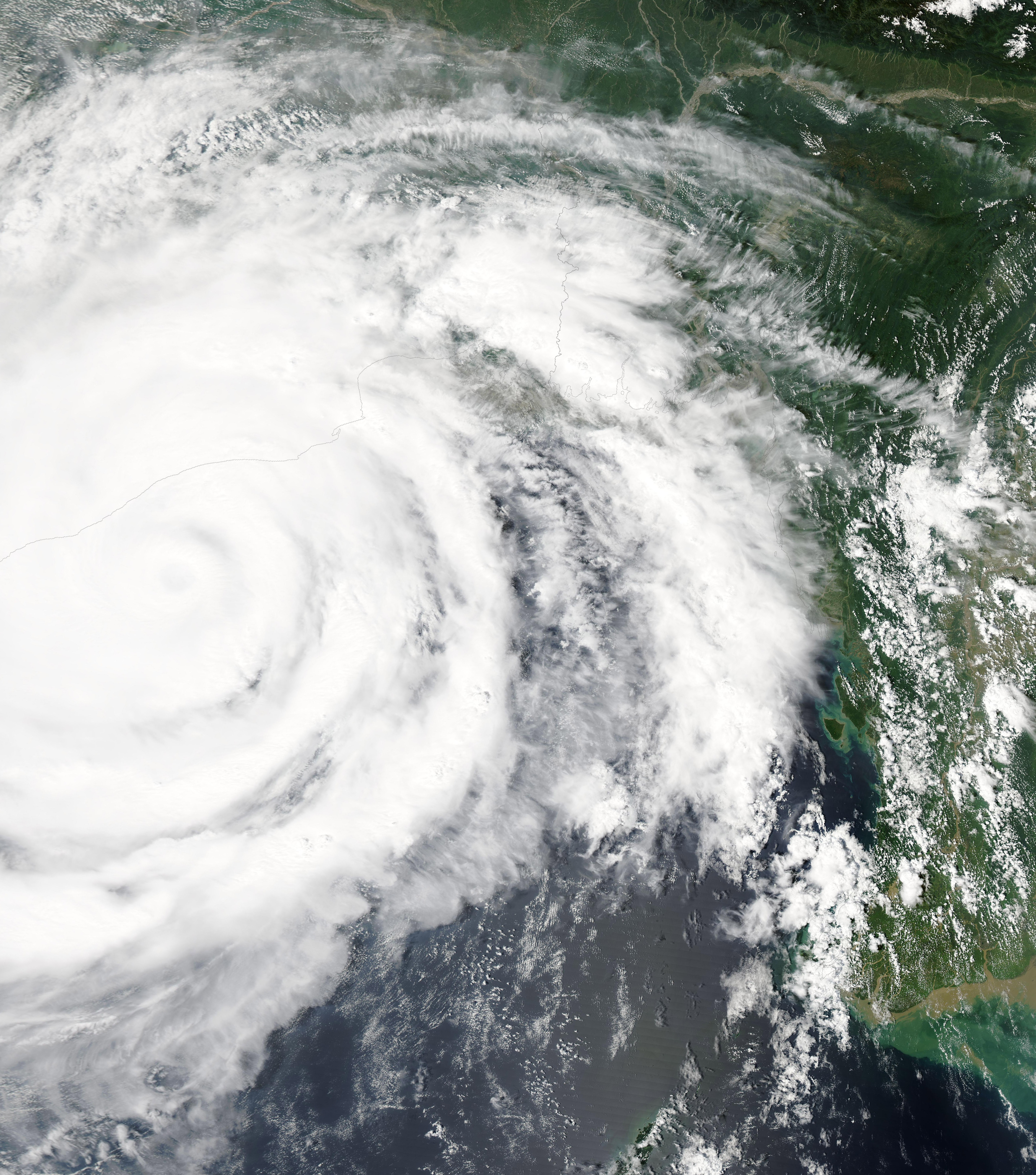
Phailin in its second eyewall replacement cycle while nearing landfall on 12 October 2013.

=== India ===
In all, 46 people were killed in India, and the economic losses reached ₹260 billion (US$4.26 billion).

==== Andaman and Nicobar Islands ====
On 8 October, the IMD warned the Andaman and Nicobar Islands that squally to gale-force wind speeds would be recorded over the islands and surrounding sea areas during the next two days. They also warned that heavy to very heavy rainfall would occur over the islands while some damage to thatched huts, power and communication lines was expected. These warnings were continued until 11 October, when the IMD noted that no further adverse weather, would occur over the Andaman and Nicobar Islands. Within the islands the Directorate of Health Services opened a Medical Camp in Rangat, while the Deputy Commissioner, Police and Fire Services all ensured there were no casualties. Between 8–10 October, rainfall totals of 734 mm (28.9 in) and 434 mm (17.1 in) were recorded in Mayabunder and on the Long Island.

==== Andhra Pradesh ====
The Andhra Pradesh government and the Chief Minister met representatives of the Army and Navy seeking their assistance if required. Utility workers striking against the division of Andhra Pradesh called off their strike partly in view of the cyclone threat to the coastal districts. The state government ordered the evacuation of 64,000 people living in low-lying areas.

The coastal districts of the state escaped the force of the cyclone. However, Srikakulam district experienced heavy rains and gale-force winds which uprooted tall trees and electric poles, shutting down power to areas. Throughout the state, one person was killed and damage amounted to ₹500 million (US$8.2 million). A total of 134,426 people were evacuated in the wake of the storm.

==== Odisha ====
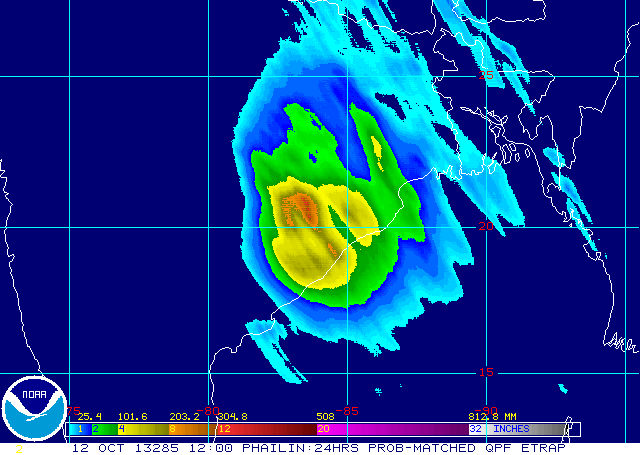
Twenty-four-hour rainfall forecast for Phailin.

Government of Odisha and its agency OSDMA evacuated close to a million people to cyclone shelters. Distant storm warning signal was raised to two at the ports of Paradip and Gopalpur of the state. The Chief Minister of Odisha wrote to the Union Defence Minister seeking support from defence personnel, particularly the Air Force and Navy, for rescue and relief operations. The Odisha government had made arrangements for over 1,000,560 food packets for relief. Indian Air Force helicopters were kept on standby in West Bengal to move in for help at short notice. A total of 1,154,725 people were evacuated in the wake of the storm and the following floods in the state.

Heavy rainfall resulted in the death of a woman in Bhubaneswar after a tall tree fell on her. Gusty winds resulted in downing of trees and powerlines. It was also reported that due to high winds, seven other people were killed in Odisha. In a period of 24 hours ending on 13 October, Banki and Balimundali in Odisha received heavy rainfall of 381 mm and 305 mm respectively.

As the storm moved inland, wind speeds picked up from 100 km/h (62 mph) to 200 km/h (120 mph) within 30 minutes. Brahmapur, the closest city to the point of landfall suffered devastation triggered by gale winds, with fallen trees, uprooted electric poles and broken walls in various places of the city. However, there were no reports of damage to property or life according to the city police. As of 18 October 44 people have been reported dead from Odisha.

Phailin severely impacted Chilika Lake, a large brackish coastal lagoon that hosts a large number of endangered animal and plant species. Storm surge uprooted mangrove trees and contaminated large areas of land with saltwater; a forest department official also warned that seawater brought in by the surge could acidify the lake.

Losses across Odisha amounted to ₹42.42 billion (US$696 million). Phailin damaged crops over 500,000 hectares of agricultural land throughout the state.

==== Jharkhand ====
During 13 October, heavy rain from the outer bands of Phailin lashed Jharkhand. A rainfall total of 74.6 mm (2.94 in) was recorded at Ranchi, while Jamshedpur recorded 52.4 mm (2.06 in), and Bokaro recorded 58.4 mm (2.30 in).

Barring an early morning lightning strike at Simdradhao village in Giridih district in which a person was killed, according to police, there were no reports of rain-related casualty anywhere in the state. The Disaster Management Department and the district administrations were monitoring the situation.

At least 400 huts were destroyed following heavy rains accompanied by gales in Pakur district of Jharkhand. Triggered by heavy rains, a couple of pillars of the Irga river bridge were damaged in Giridih District.

==== Other Indian states ====
The areas of West Bengal, Chhattisgarh, Bihar and eastern parts of Uttar Pradesh are likely to experience heavy rainfall and strong winds. There is risk of trees falling and disruption of light or electricity poles. However, the effect here will not be as severe as that in Odisha and Andhra Pradesh.

A Merchant Ship MV Bingo was feared to have sunk in rough seas off the coast of West Bengal due to Cyclone Phailin. The crew of 20 were spotted in lifeboats by the Coast Guard and were rescued.

Fish driven from the ocean by the Cyclone Phailin were caught in Assam.

=== Nepal ===
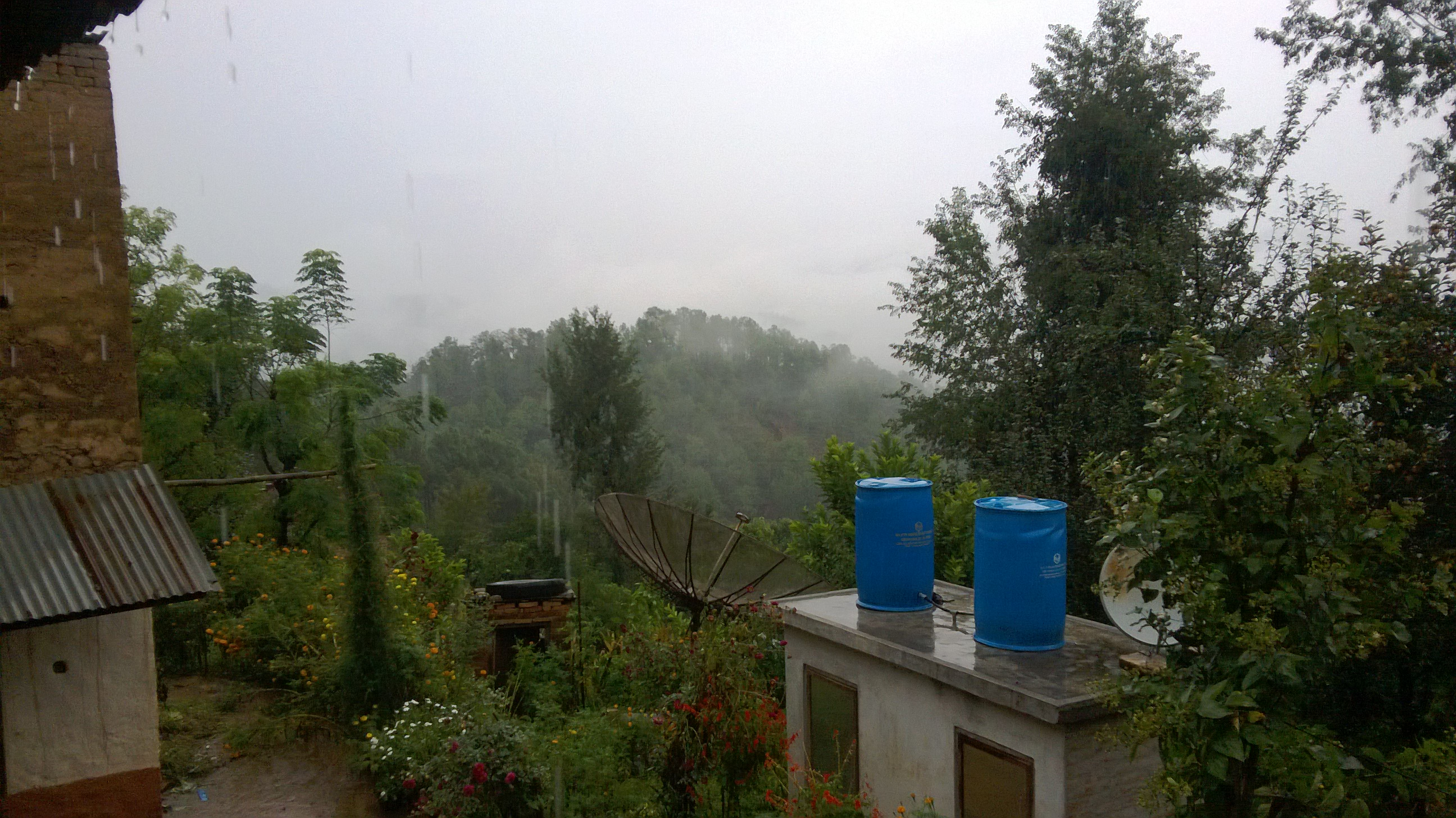
October rain caused by Cyclone Phailin in Panchkhal Valley

The eastern region of Nepal experienced heavy rainfall and winds while it was lighter in the central and western part of the country. Rainfall began in the eastern and mid-western region since early morning on 13 October and began in the central regional too in the afternoon . The impact of the cyclone continued until 15 October. Nepalese great festival Dashain was affected by the October rain. It caused flood in Kosi and Gandaki rivers in Nepal.

== See also ==
- 1977 Andhra Pradesh cyclone
- Typhoon Gay (1989)
- 1999 Odisha cyclone
- Cyclone Hudhud
- Cyclone Fani
- Cyclone Amphan
- Cyclone Michaung
- Cyclone Yaas
