= Gopalpur, Odisha =

Gopalpur Gopalpur-on-Sea
- Town
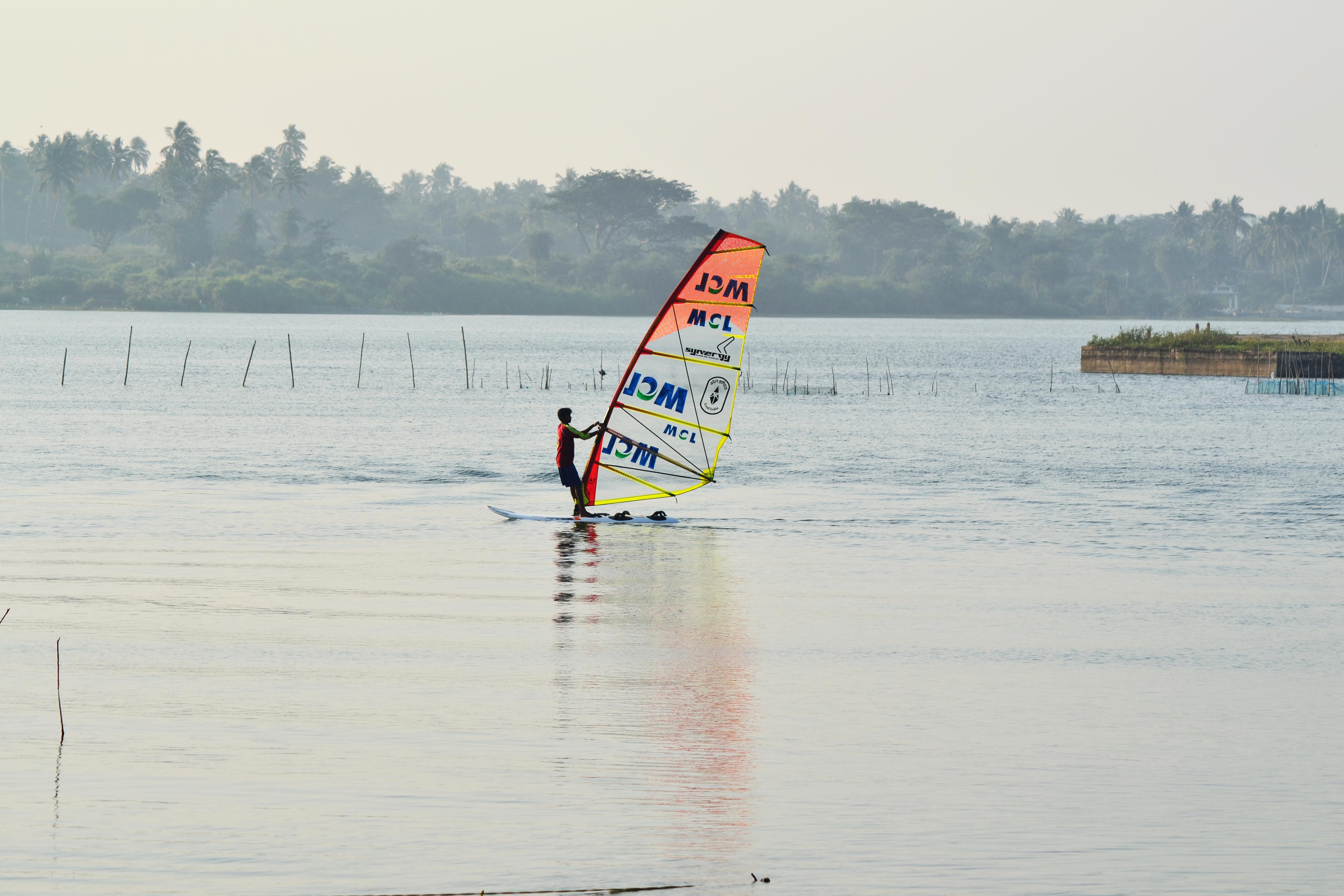
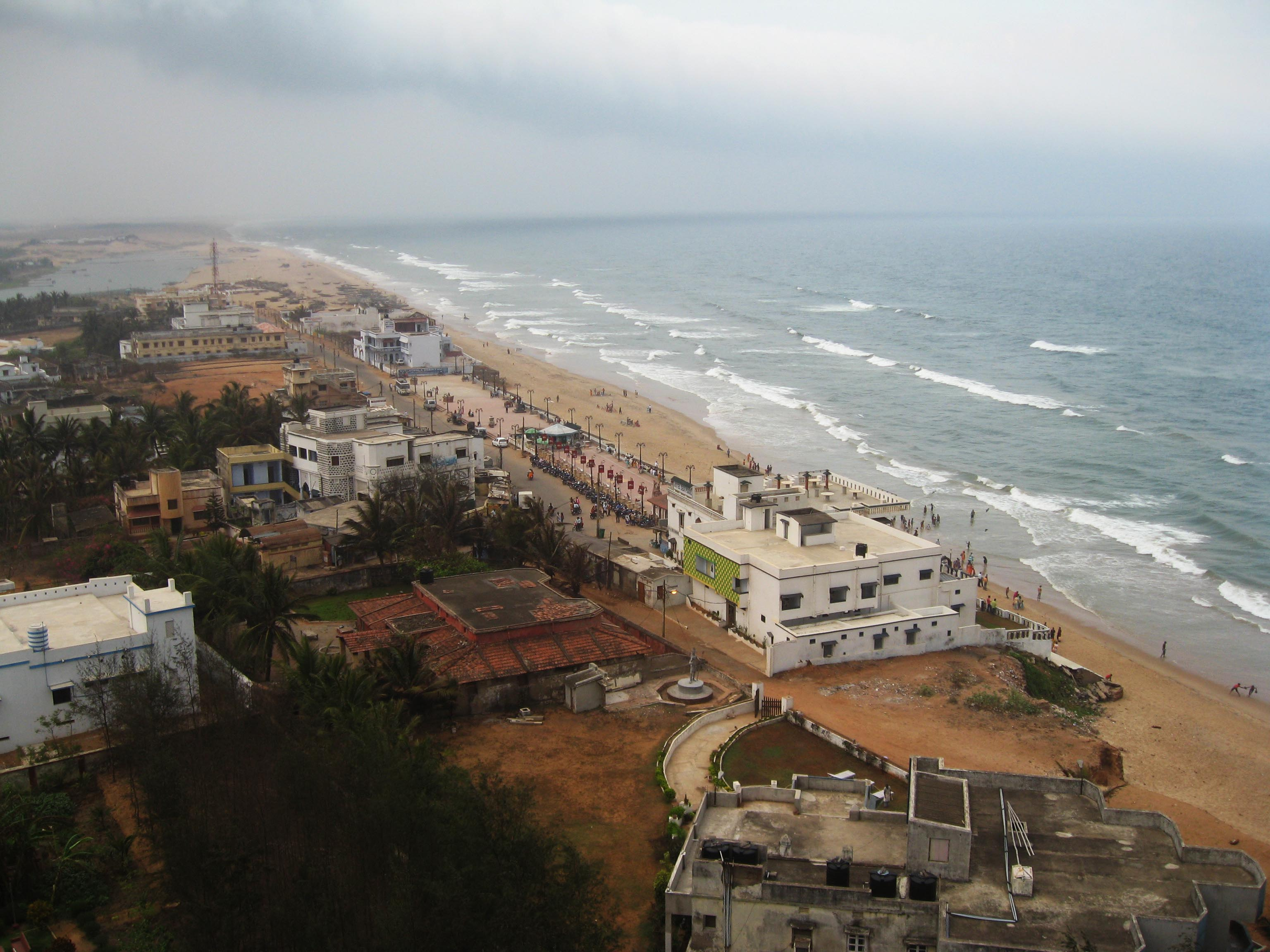
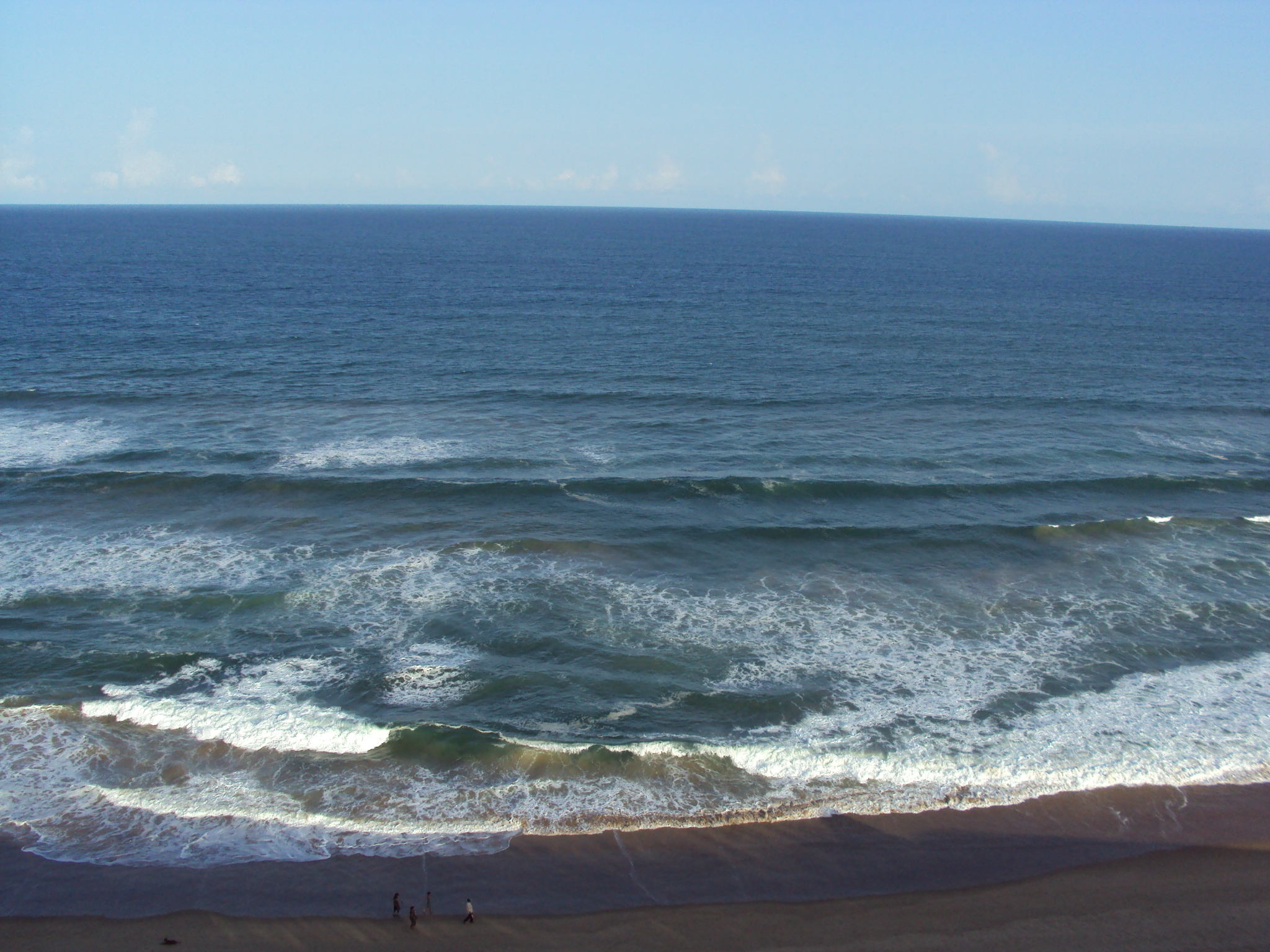
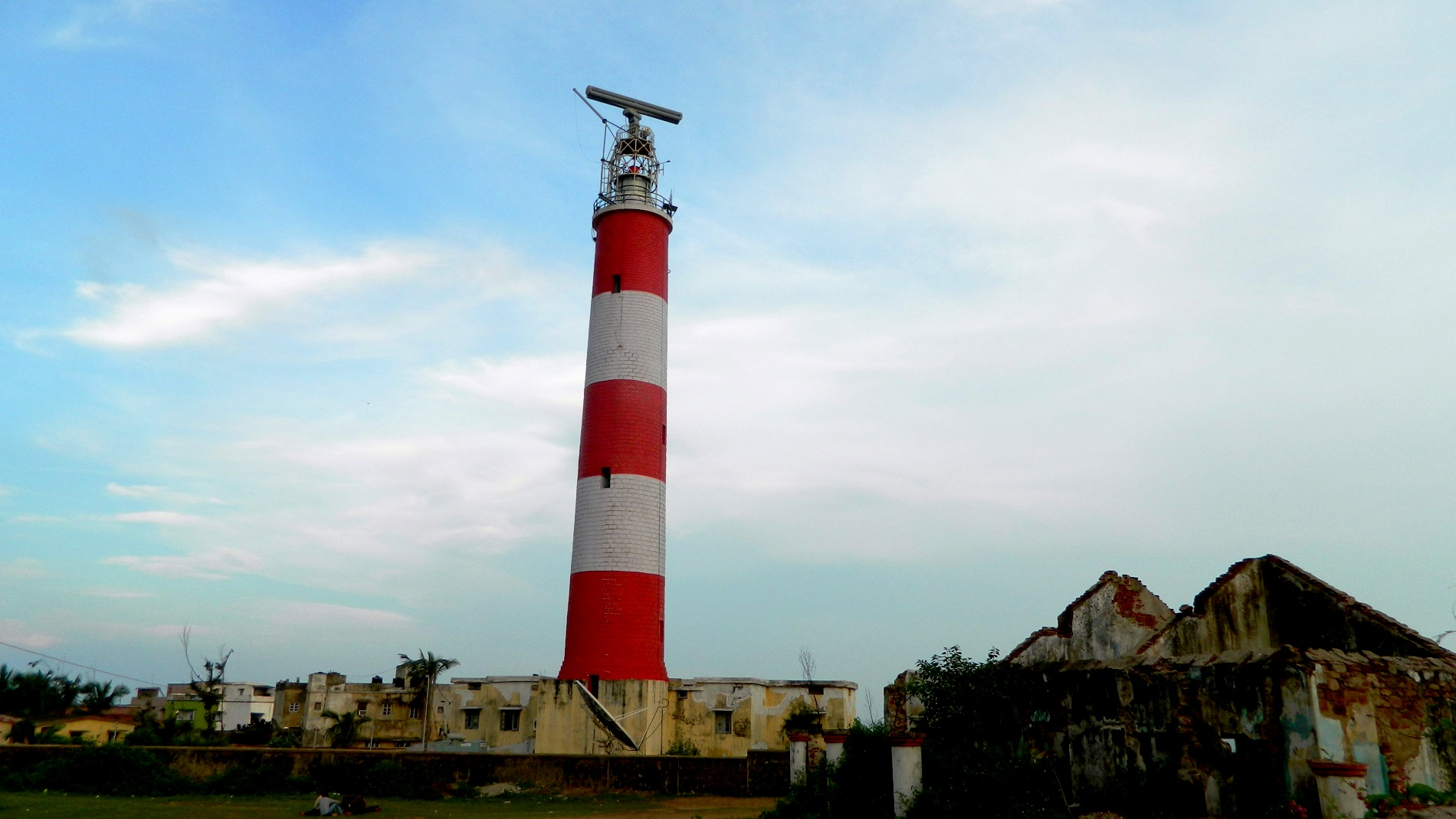
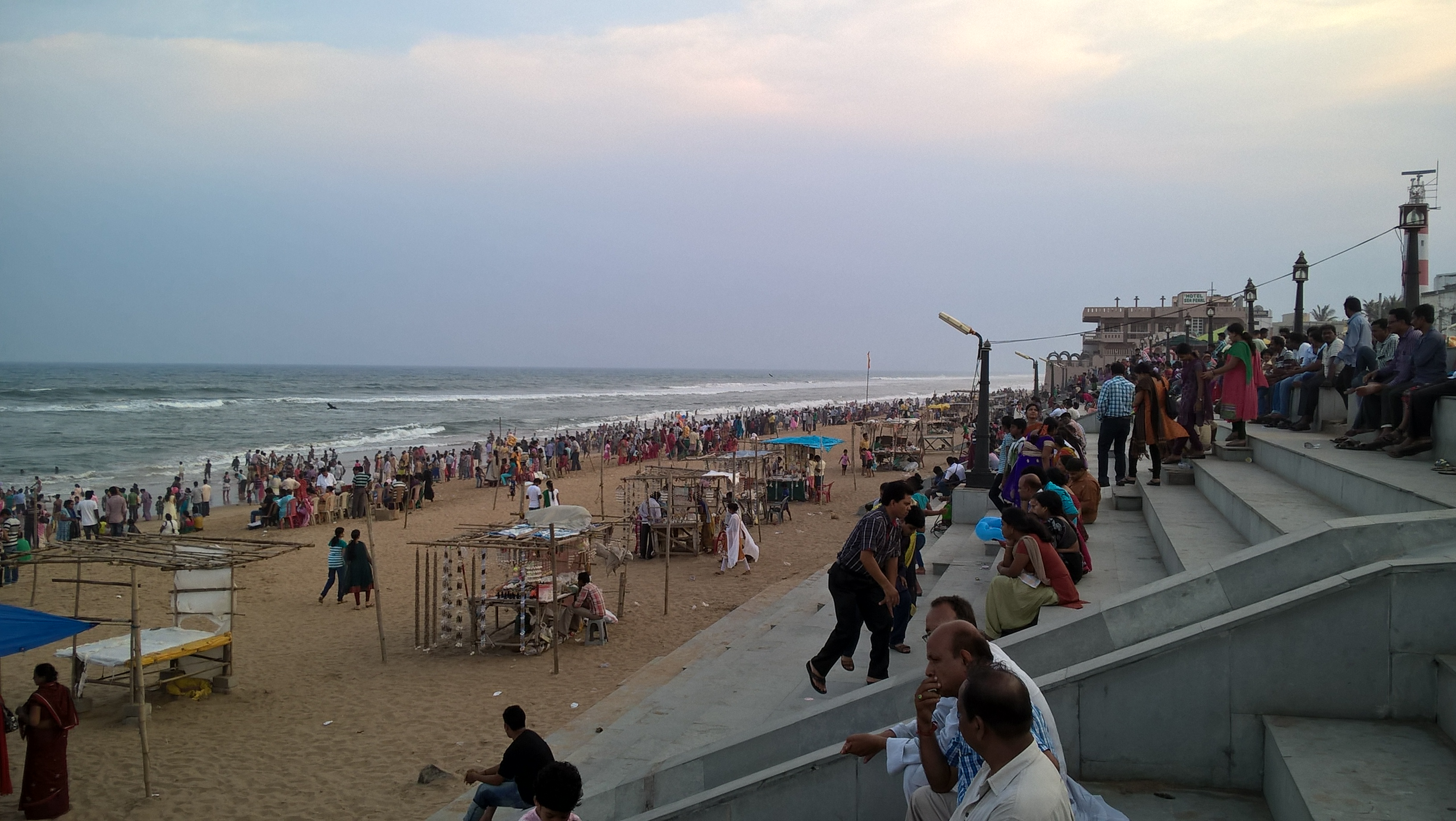
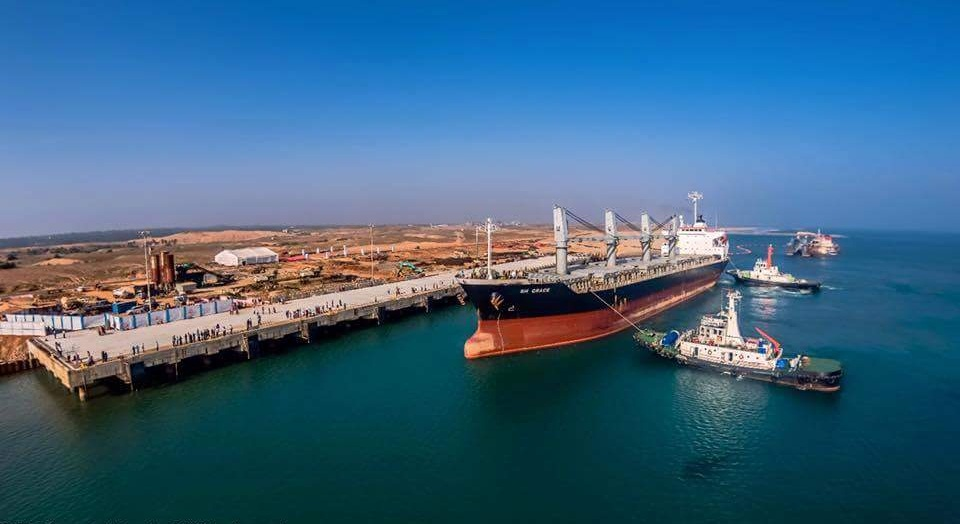
- Wind surfing, Gopalpur aerial view, Sea waves at Gopalpur, Gopalpur light house, Gopalpur sea beach and Gopalpur port

- Location within Odisha Location within India
- Coordinates: 19.27°N 84.92°E
- Country: India
- State: Odisha
- District: Ganjam

Government
  - Type: Notified Area Council
  - Body: Gopalpur N.A.C.
- Elevation: 1 m (3.3 ft)

Population (2011)
  - Total: 7,221

Languages
  - Official: Odia
- Time zone: UTC+5:30 (IST)
- PIN: 761002
- Telephone code: 0680
- Vehicle registration: OR-07 (Old); OD-07
- Sex ratio: 1000 ♂/♀
- Website: odisha.gov.in

Gopalpur or Gopalpur-on-Sea is a coastal town and a Notified Area Council in Ganjam district in Odisha, India. Gopalpur is around 15 km from Berhampur. Located on the southern part of the state, it was an ancient seaside resort on the shores of the Bay of Bengal, now more associated with its port.

== Demographics ==
As of the 2001 India census, Gopalpur had a population of 6660. Males constituted 50% of the population and females 50%. Gopalpur had an average literacy rate of 51%, lower than the national average of 59.5%: male literacy was 59%, and female literacy was 42%. In Gopalpur, 12% of the population was under 6 years of age.

Religion in Gopalpur
Hinduism	90.04%
Islam	2.45%
Christianity	7.33%
Sikh	0.00%
Buddhist	0.04%
Jain	0.01%
Not Stated	0.12%
Other	0.01%

== History ==
=== Ancient Kalinga era ===
Gopalpur has an ancient sea port which was operational during the heyday of maritime Kalinga region. It was used to enter Southeast Asia by travellers who embarked on their voyage.

=== Post-Medieval era ===
Under the ownership of the Soraine family the village grew in wealth, from an obscure little fishing village, Gopalpur became a prominent trading port. The family built the port, the lighthouse and the Albert Hotel and established both a local fishing industry and a trade route with Burma.

Gopalpur on sea, was once a Dutch establishment. Back in those days, S.K. Dey owned almost half of Gopalpur.

They also established the bylaw allowing any villagers who could build a house, with a perimeter and light a fire in the fireplace overnight, could then keep the land and house (on the backwaters) as their own.

During the British rule family squabbles and disputes resulted in much being transferred to British missionaries. The Albert Hotel now locked in ownership battles and lying derelict is the last remnant of those squabbles.

During the days of British East India Company The East India Company built large warehouses and godowns because the trade with Burma had picked up and it had become a trading point for rice from Rangoon.

Victor Soraine returned to India from England and built BetVic house where he retired, surrounded by memories of childhood and his family legacy. His final wish was granted when he was buried in Christian cemetery just a few years ago.

Once a house to a Europeans and Anglo Indians now only a few of the families live here.

== Beach ==
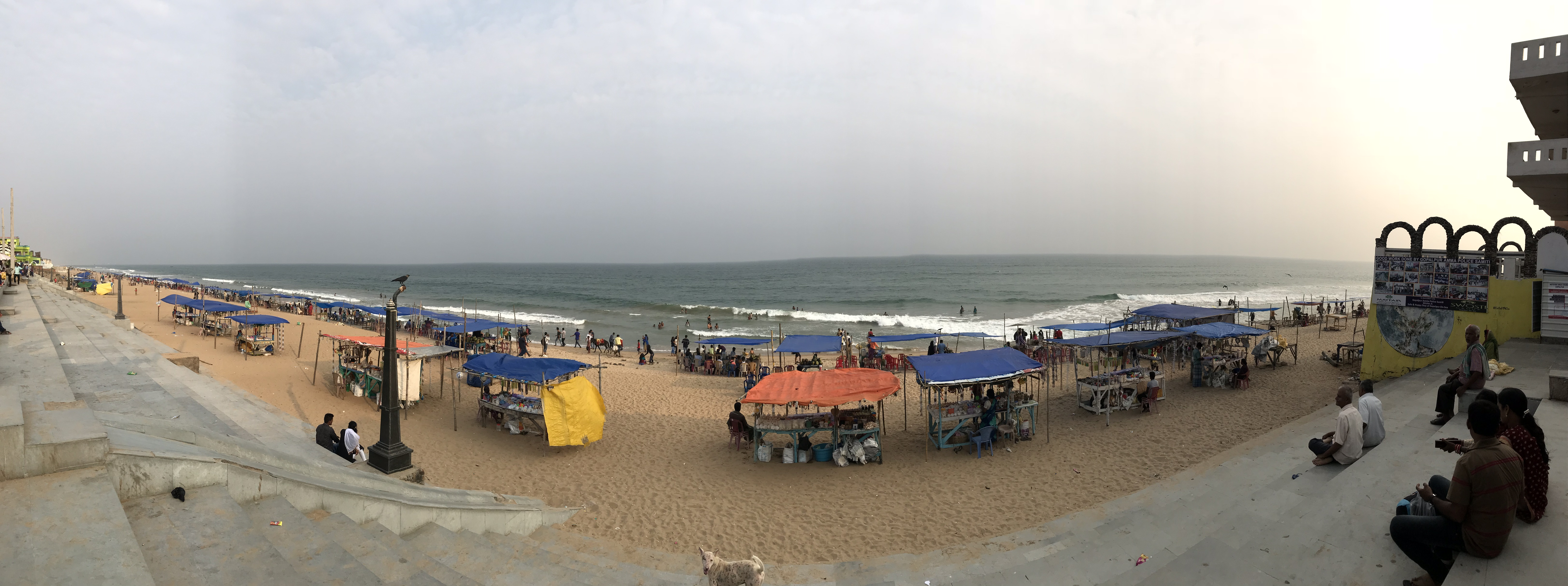
Panorama view of Gopalpur Sea Beach

Barely 16 km away from Brahmapur (it is also at times considered as a part of Brahmapur), the commercial hub of southern Odisha and close to the border of Andhra Pradesh, is the tiny town of Gopalpur on the Bay of Bengal. This languorous beach with coconut groves, casuarinas and gentle sand dunes is deserted for miles.

=== Development ===
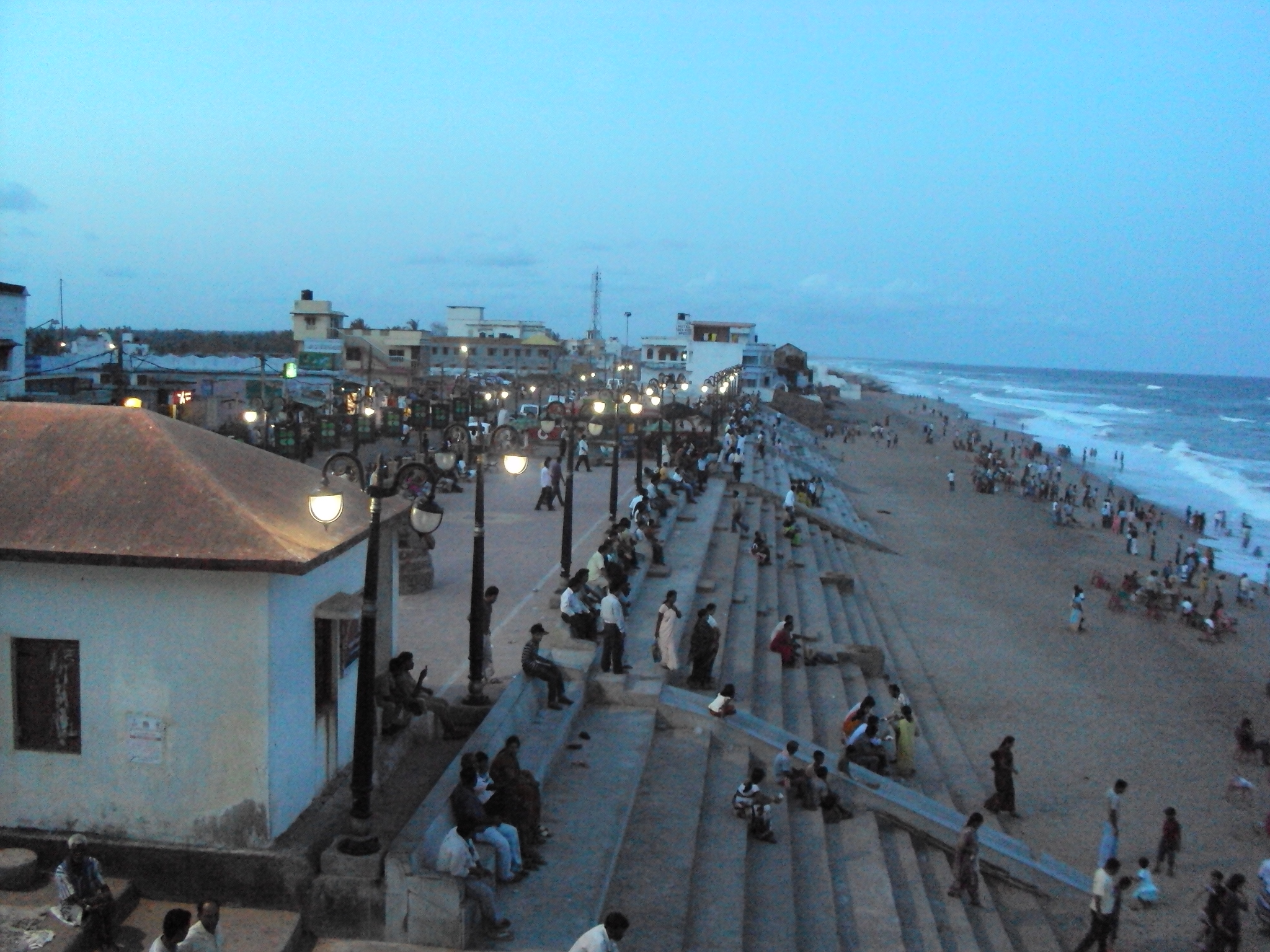
Entrance to Gopalpur Beach

Renovated in the 1970s at the initiative of the Odisha government, the jetties were supposed to revive the trading activities of Gopalpur port. The old jetty in Gopalpur is tourist attraction point, which was a major point for trade and commerce in medieval times. The sailors of those time started their journey from this jetty to Indonesia and Rangoon across the Indian Sea. Once the renovation of new jetty completed it will become an important port of south Odisha. It's a wonderful drive-in for the people and from the beach, a vast expanse of deep blue sea and the horizon can be seen. Another thrilling sight is the long stretch of cashew nut trees. Cashew nuts are processed here and exported. A major landmark of Gopalpur is its lighthouse. The view from the top is splendid and one can see at a glance the entire town of Gopalpur. Gopalour is also famous for its 'beach festival' organized annually. A nearby beach is Dhabaleshwar, which also houses a temple of the same name. People here can speak Odia and English.

=== Beach festival and other attractions near Gopalpur ===
Gopalpur Beach Festival: The first Gopalpur beach festival was held in 1996 by Gopalpur Club in association with Ganjam District Hotel Association to promote tourism and culture. The concept of Gopalpur Beach Festival was conceived by members of Gopalpur Club along with the members of Ganjam District Hotel Association.

== Geography and climate ==
Gopalpur is located at 19.27°N 84.92°E on the coast of Bay of Bengal, around 160 km south of Paradip and 260 km north of Visakhapatnam. It is a natural, deep sea port on the east coast of India. Gopalpur lies on a 4 km stretch of barren coast line, with no mangrove or tropical forests. The coast line falls in the rain-shadow of the region. The climate in the region is tropical wet and dry. Temperatures range from 32 degrees in summer to 17 degrees in winter. The region receives rainfall in both advance and retreat of the Southwest monsoon. Gopalpur has witnessed notable and strong tropical storms in history, including the Super cyclone of 1999 and Cyclone Phailin of 2013, the latter hitting the town directly.

Climate data for Gopalpur (1991–2020, extremes 1901–2020)
Month	Jan	Feb	Mar	Apr	May	Jun	Jul	Aug	Sep	Oct	Nov	Dec	Year
Record high °C (°F)	34.3 (93.7)	36.7 (98.1)	40.0 (104.0)	39.1 (102.4)	43.3 (109.9)	44.0 (111.2)	39.4 (102.9)	37.7 (99.9)	37.1 (98.8)	37.0 (98.6)	36.1 (97.0)	33.2 (91.8)	44.0 (111.2)
Mean daily maximum °C (°F)	27.8 (82.0)	29.9 (85.8)	31.4 (88.5)	31.8 (89.2)	33.0 (91.4)	32.5 (90.5)	31.6 (88.9)	31.8 (89.2)	32.5 (90.5)	32.1 (89.8)	30.5 (86.9)	28.5 (83.3)	31.1 (88.0)
Mean daily minimum °C (°F)	16.9 (62.4)	19.8 (67.6)	23.3 (73.9)	25.3 (77.5)	26.9 (80.4)	27.1 (80.8)	26.5 (79.7)	26.2 (79.2)	26.0 (78.8)	24.0 (75.2)	20.4 (68.7)	17.0 (62.6)	23.3 (73.9)
Record low °C (°F)	10.0 (50.0)	11.7 (53.1)	15.4 (59.7)	16.5 (61.7)	19.3 (66.7)	20.5 (68.9)	20.6 (69.1)	18.6 (65.5)	20.6 (69.1)	16.7 (62.1)	9.6 (49.3)	10.0 (50.0)	9.6 (49.3)
Average rainfall mm (inches)	11.1 (0.44)	10.6 (0.42)	12.5 (0.49)	28.3 (1.11)	69.8 (2.75)	127.3 (5.01)	202.4 (7.97)	200.0 (7.87)	206.1 (8.11)	200.7 (7.90)	66.1 (2.60)	11.3 (0.44)	1,146.2 (45.13)
Average rainy days	0.8	0.8	0.8	1.7	3.7	7.2	9.5	10.4	8.6	7.1	2.6	0.6	54.0
Average relative humidity (%) (at 17:30 IST)	72	75	81	84	84	83	85	84	82	76	70	67	78
Source: India Meteorological Department

== Politics ==
Current MLA from Gopalpur (SC) Assembly Constituency is Pradeep Panigrahi of BJD, who won the seat in State elections of 2014 and continuing since 2009. Previous MLAs from this seat was Trinatha Behera who won this seat in 2004 as INC candidate, Rama Chandra Sethy who won here in 2000 as BJD candidate and as JD candidate in 1995 and 1990, and Ghanashyam Behera who won this seat as INC candidate in 1985 and 1977 and as INC(I) candidate in 1980. Gopalpur is part of Berhampur (Lok Sabha constituency).
