= Cyclone Hudhud =

Category 4 North Indian Ocean cyclone in 2014

Extremely Severe Cyclonic Storm Hudhud
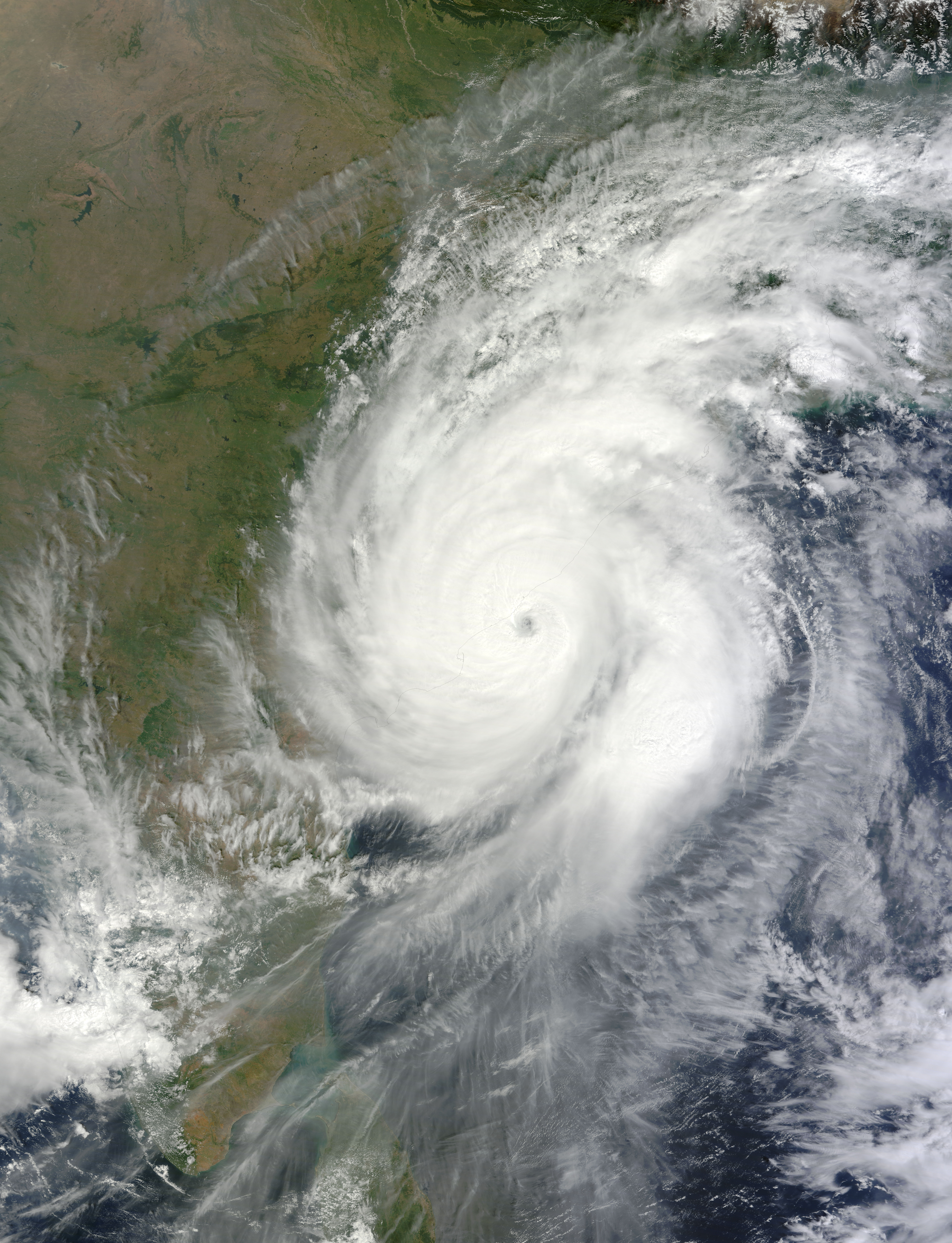
- Hudhud nearing landfall at peak intensity on 12 October

Meteorological history
- Formed: 7 October 2014
- Dissipated: 14 October 2014

Extremely severe cyclonic storm
- 3-minute sustained (IMD)
- Highest winds: 185 km/h (115 mph)
- Lowest pressure: 950 hPa (mbar); 28.05 inHg

Category 4-equivalent tropical cyclone
- 1-minute sustained (SSHWS/JTWC)
- Highest winds: 215 km/h (130 mph)
- Lowest pressure: 937 hPa (mbar); 27.67 inHg

Overall effects
- Fatalities: 116
- Damage: $11 billion (2014 USD)
- Areas affected: Andaman and Nicobar Islands; Andhra Pradesh (especially Visakhapatnam); Odisha; Chhattisgarh; Madhya Pradesh; Uttar Pradesh; Bihar; Jharkhand; Bangladesh; Nepal
- IBTrACS
- Part of the 2014 North Indian Ocean cyclone season

Extremely Severe Cyclonic Storm Hudhud (Note: The name Hudhud (Arabic: هدهد, [hud.hud]) was contributed by Oman and refers to the Eurasian hoopoe (Upupa epops) in Arabic.) brought heavy rain and powerful winds in eastern India and snowstorms in Nepal in October 2014. Hudhud originated from a low-pressure area in the Bay of Bengal and strengthened into a cyclone on 8 October, receiving the name Hudhud. It made its first landfall on Long Island in the Andaman and Nicobar Islands before re-emerging into the Bay of Bengal on 9 October. Amid favorable conditions, Hudhud underwent rapid intensification, making landfall on Visakhapatnam on 12 October at peak intensity with a minimum central pressure of 950 mbar (28 inHg). Hudhud weakened inland, degenerating into a low-pressure area over Uttar Pradesh on 14 October. It then merged with a trough over the Himalayas.

During Hudhud's landfall, strong winds shattered glass, uprooted trees and poles, and threw debris across roads. In Andhra Pradesh and Odisha, 730,000 residents were moved to relief camps or shelters following the cyclone, and thousands of homes and crops suffered damage. In Nepal, Hudhud's remnants caused a snowstorm disaster which killed 43 and injured hundreds more, with most of the casualties coming from Mount Annapurna.

In the aftermath of Hudhud, special response forces mounted relief efforts across the affected states, with the state governments of Andhra Pradesh and Odisha requesting a combined total of ₹27,771,200,000 (US$455.05 million) (Note: All currency totals are unadjusted for inflation.) in aid. A joint military operation named Lehar ("wave"), led by the Indian Navy, saw various branches of the military deploying and readying response teams and vehicles. Hudhud caused a combined total of 116 deaths and $11 billion (2014 USD) in damage across India and Nepal.

== Meteorological history ==
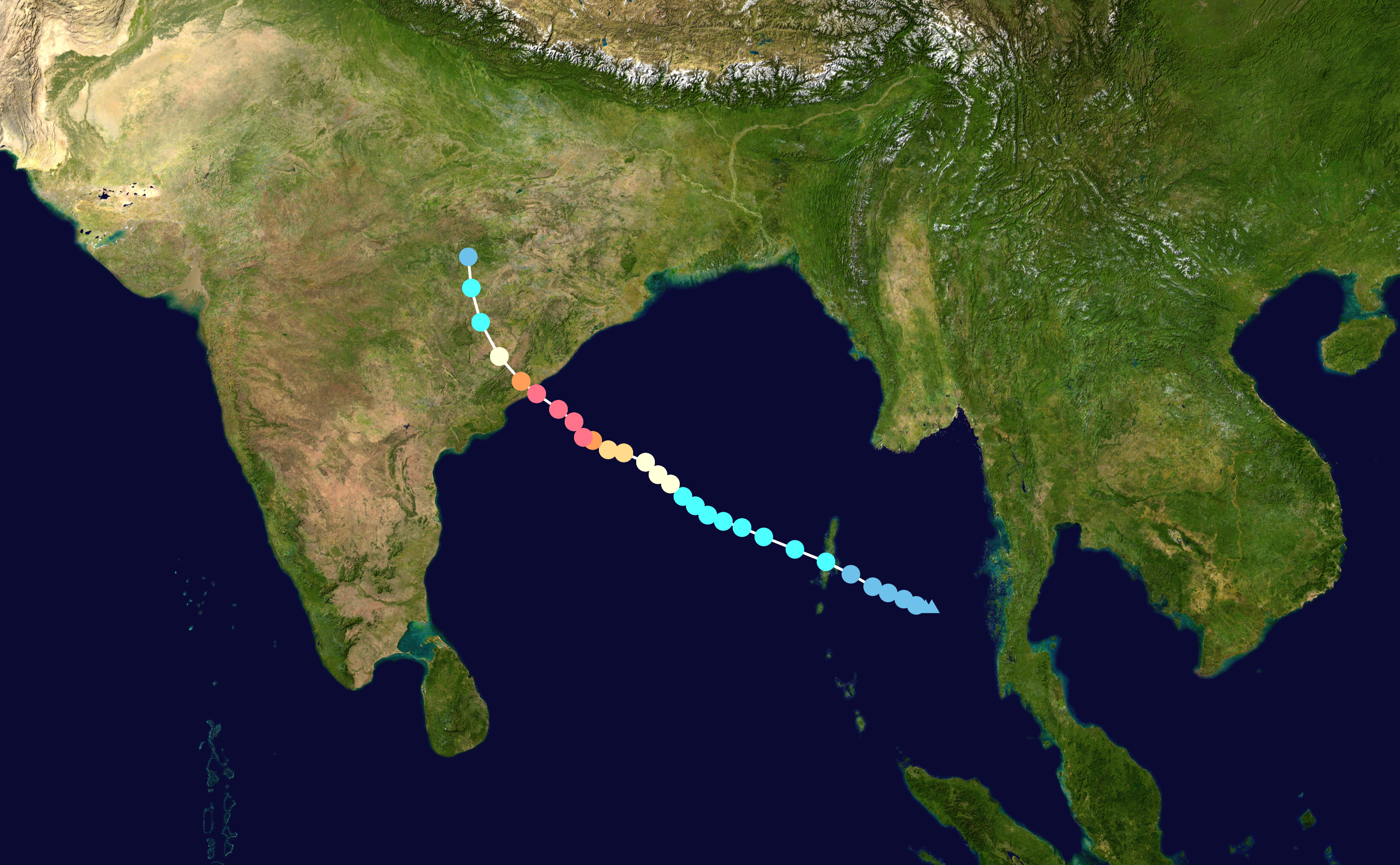
Map plotting the storm's track and intensity, according to the Saffir–Simpson scale Map key Saffir–Simpson scale Tropical depression (≤38 mph, ≤62 km/h) Tropical storm (39–73 mph, 63–118 km/h) Category 1 (74–95 mph, 119–153 km/h) Category 2 (96–110 mph, 154–177 km/h) Category 3 (111–129 mph, 178–208 km/h) Category 4 (130–156 mph, 209–251 km/h) Category 5 (≥157 mph, ≥252 km/h) Unknown Storm type Tropical cyclone Subtropical cyclone Extratropical cyclone, remnant low, tropical disturbance, or monsoon depression

On 6 October, the India Meteorological Department (IMD) began tracking a low-pressure area that formed over the Gulf of Thailand as a result of a cyclonic circulation. On 7 October, the low-pressure area strengthened into a depression over the northern Andaman Sea. It further strengthened into a deep depression later that day as it moved westwards. The Joint Typhoon Warning Center (JTWC) also began tracking the system on 8 October, designating it as tropical cyclone 03B. Later that day, it strengthened into Cyclonic Storm Hudhud before making its first landfall on Long Island in the Andaman and Nicobar Islands. Hudhud continued intensifying as it emerged into the eastern Bay of Bengal on 9 October and intensified into a severe cyclonic storm later that day with a minimum three-minute sustained central pressure of 990 mbar (29 inHg). Increased curved banding was also noted that day.

On 10 October, Hudhud strengthened into a very severe cyclonic storm with a three-minute sustained central pressure of 984 mbar (29.1 inHg). Early on 11 October, Hudhud entered the radar range of Visakhapatnam while continuing to move northwestwards toward the coast of Andhra Pradesh. Curved banding increased and the appearance of an eye was noted. Amid favorable conditions that day, Hudhud underwent rapid intensification, with a clearly visible eye as it approached northern Andhra Pradesh. Its minimum central pressure was 950 mbar (28 inHg). (Note: Operationally, the IMD assessed the cyclone's central pressure at 960 mbar (28 inHg). A post-cyclone report reanalyzed it to 950 mbar (28 inHg).) It maintained its intensity as it stalled southeast of Visakhapatnam. Hudhud made its second and final landfall near Visakhapatnam at peak intensity during the afternoon of 12 October.

After moving over land, Hudhud weakened into a severe cyclonic storm and then a cyclonic storm northwest of Visakhapatnam. It weakened into a deep depression the following day over southern Chhattisgarh. It further weakened into a depression that evening over central Chhattisgarh and persisted northward, degenerating into a low pressure area on 14 October over eastern Uttar Pradesh. The weakening remnants of Hudhud then merged with an upper-level trough, resulting in an interaction over the Himalayas which produced a heavy amount of moisture.

== Preparations ==
Hudhud traversing the Andaman and Nicobar Islands

On 9 October, the IMD placed areas of northern Andhra Pradesh and southern Odisha under a heavy rainfall warning. Across both states, 44 National Disaster Response Force (NDRF) teams and eight rescue teams were mobilized. Prime Minister Narendra Modi discussed readiness and response efforts with high-ranking officials in a meeting on 11 October. In Odisha, district officials were told to prepare kitchens and store dry food supplies. Ten Odisha Disaster Rapid Action Force (ODRAF) teams were sent out and preparations were made to evacuate those living in unsafe houses. Panic buying also occurred in the state on 8 October. Emergency response teams were mobilized for railways. Indian Railways considered rerouting or cancelling 75 trains in the South Central Railway zone. In Andhra Pradesh, 111,000 people living in coastal districts were evacuated, 370 relief camps were readied, and two months' worth of food was stocked. All flights from the Visakhapatnam Airport were suspended. A cricket match between the Indian and West Indies cricket team, set to be played in Visakhapatnam on 14 October, was cancelled.

== Impact ==
Costliest known North Indian cyclones (adjusted for inflation)
Rank	Cyclone	Season	Damage (2025 USD)
1	ESCS Nargis	2008	$22.9 billion
2	CS Senyar	2025	$20.1 billion
3	SuCS Amphan	2020	$19.3 billion
4	ESCS Hudhud	2014	$15 billion
5	ESCS Fani	2019	$10.2 billion
6	SuCS BOB 06	1999	$8.58 billion
7	SuCS Gonu	2007	$6.86 billion
8	ESCS ARB 02	1998	$5.93 billion
9	ESCS Phailin	2013	$5.89 billion
10	VSCS Vardah	2016	$4.53 billion

=== India ===
==== Andhra Pradesh ====
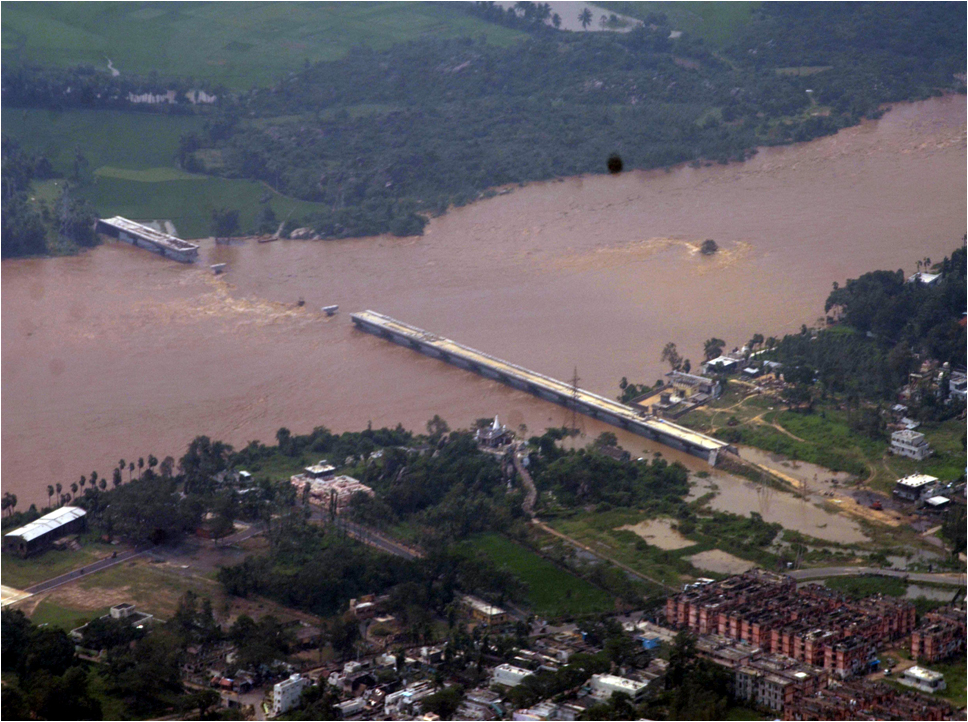
A collapsed bridge near Visakhapatnam

Strong winds shattered glass and left debris strewn across roads in Visakhapatnam. 70 per cent of the city's trees were destroyed. A 1.4 m (4.6 ft) storm surge wore down parts of the city's shoreline. Gantyada recorded 380 mm (15 in) of rain in 24 hours on 12–13 October, the highest in the state. The cyclone damaged Visakhapatnam Airport, flooding a runway and tearing off its roof. It did not operate from 11 to 17 October. Damage to it was estimated at ₹5,000,000,000 (US$81.93 million). The Visakhapatnam Steel Plant lost power from 12–16 October, halting operations and causing losses of about ₹3,500,000,000 (US$57.35 million). Operations at the headquarters of the Eastern Naval Command were disrupted, and the Indian Navy incurred losses of ₹20,000,000,000 (US$327.71 million).

The campus of Andhra University sustained widespread destruction; numerous offices inside the buildings were rendered unusable, the roofs of all 16 canteens were stripped, and the walls of six structures gave way. More than 90 percent of the campus' trees were felled. On 14 October, The Hindu described the state of most academic buildings as "unapproachable". Damage was assessed to be near ₹2,370,000,000 (US$38.83 million). 1,000 m (3,300 ft) of surrounding walls and several enclosures were destroyed at the Indira Gandhi Zoological Park, allowing some animals to roam unrestricted. Over 2,000 downed trees cluttered the facility, creating hindrances to navigation and harming animals. The zoo reopened on 11 November after the restoration of 65 enclosures and clearing of felled trees and debris.

Local police and NDRF members rescued residents trapped in vehicles on highways. At least 6,075.43 km (3,775.10 mi) of roads were affected, (Note: Damage to national highways was not assessed.) leaving 73 villages isolated for up to 2 days. Hudhud caused widespread power outages in Andhra Pradesh due to it damaging 27,041 electric poles. 33 drinking wells and 39.4 km (24.5 mi) of water lines were also damaged, along with 197 water towers and 102 pumping stations. The cyclone caused a water shortage in Visakhapatnam, resulting in inflated bottled water prices. Power outages exhausted suppliers' existing bottled water inventory. 41,269 houses and 237,854 ha (587,750 acres) of cropland were impacted across the state. The cyclone caused 46 deaths and 43 injuries in Andhra Pradesh; 2,446,532 livestock—2,831 larger animals and 2,443,701 poultry—also died.

==== Odisha ====
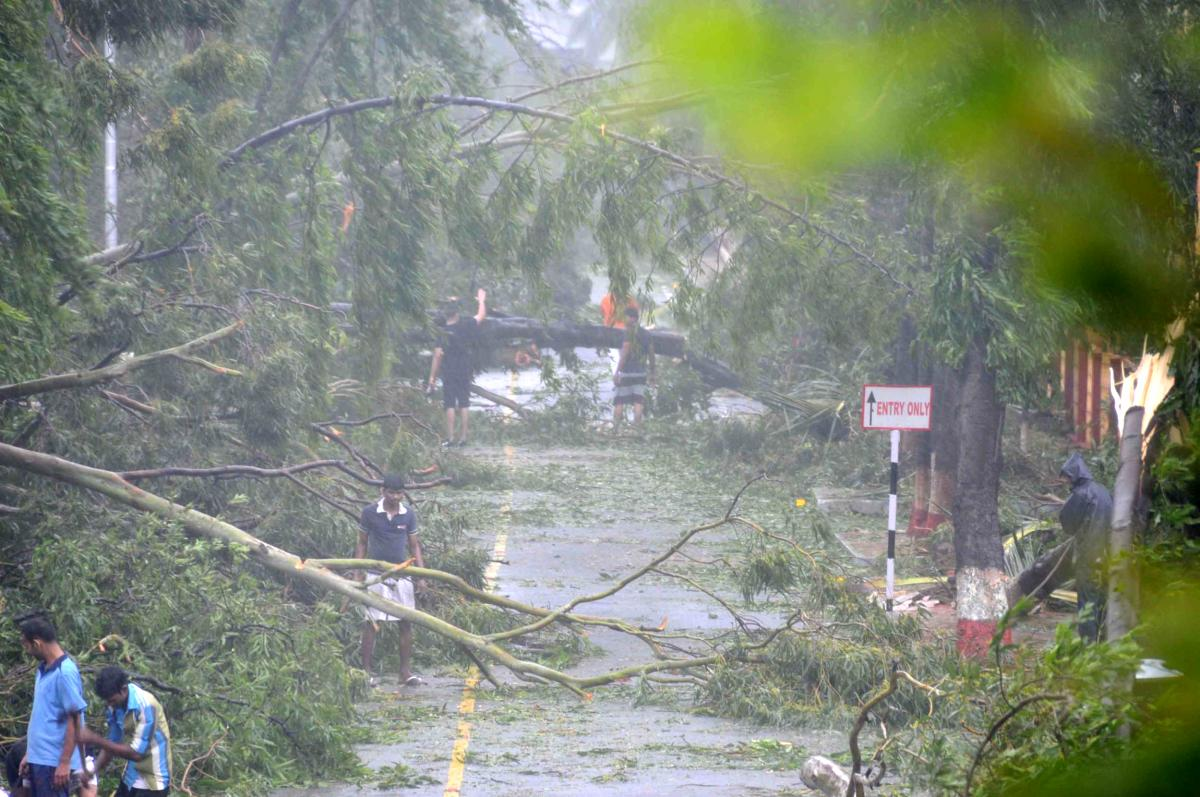
A road in Visakhapatnam after Hudhud

In rural southern Odisha, 600 electricity poles were toppled. 48,000 thatched homes were damaged or destroyed. 230,000 people were temporarily moved to shelters. Out of the 247,557 hectares (611,730 acres) of crops that were affected, 40,484 hectares (100,040 acres) lost more than half of their contents. 670 livestock were killed. The Vamsadhara River crested at 55.28 m (181.4 ft) on 13 October near Kashinagar, above the danger level of 54.60 m (179.1 ft). A maximum of 260 mm (10 in) of precipitation fell in R. Udayagiri in a 24-hour span on 12–13 October. Three deaths occurred in Odisha due to the cyclone, while twelve others were injured.

==== Elsewhere ====
In the Andaman and Nicobar Islands, Hudhud downed trees, forcing the closing of the Andaman Trunk Road on 8 October. A total of 210 mm (8.3 in) of rain fell in Port Blair in a 24-hour span between 7–8 October. Hudhud also caused extreme rainfall in Chhattisgarh, with 17 cm (6.7 in) in Manendragarh in 24 hours on 13–14 October. A house collapsed in Govindgarh, Madhya Pradesh, amid torrential rainfall on the morning of 14 October, killing a family of three and injuring another occupant. In Uttar Pradesh, rainfall killed 18 and caused damage to homes and crops. On 14 October in Lucknow, a record 61.1 mm (2.41 in) of rain fell, flooding multiple areas in the city. Accompanying strong winds damaged power lines, causing widespread power outages. Torrential rainfall in Bihar killed three and injured 50. In West Bengal, Hudhud caused minimal damage. Hotels in coastal towns such as Digha were filled up by an influx of tourists who wanted to observe the cyclone. The Sundarbans as well as a few districts in the state saw heavy rainfall. Minor rainfall and flooding occurred in Bangladesh.

=== Nepal ===
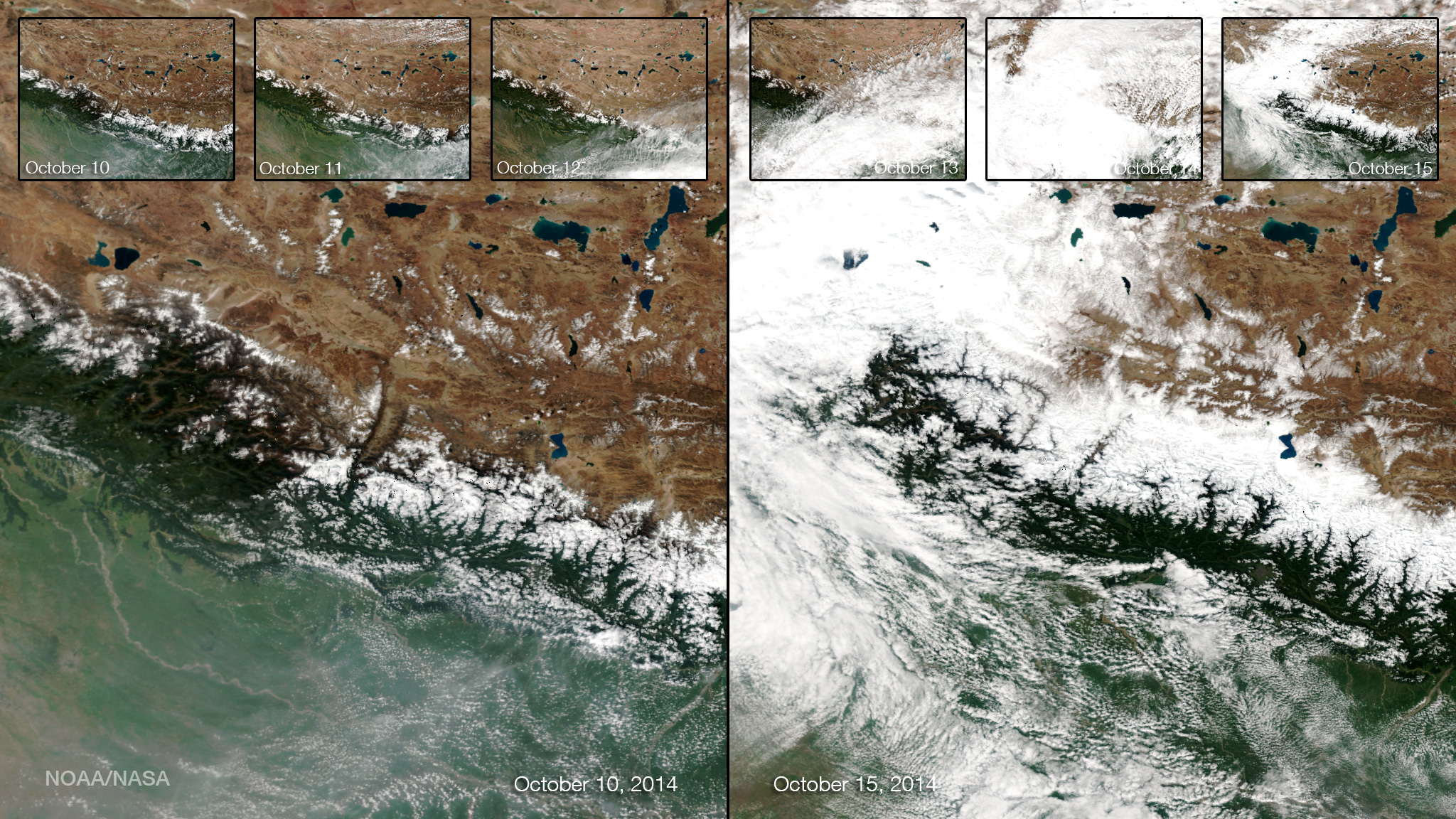
Satellite imagery shows a progression of snow cover from 10 to 15 October

On 14 October, the remnants of Hudhud caused severe avalanches and blizzards following a merger with an upper-level trough. Four people were killed on Mount Annapurna, eight in Mustang district, and eight in Manang district. 14 injured climbers were airlifted to hospitals on 15 October. 43 were killed due to the snowstorms, with 21 of the fatalities coming from Mount Annapurna. By 18 October 384 trekkers had been rescued from Mount Annapurna. The mountain received 1.8 m (5.9 ft) of snow in the span of 12 hours. On 19 October, the search for survivors ended, with close to 400 having been rescued. Many survivors were frostbitten following their rescue, requiring amputation of limbs.

== Aftermath ==
In Visakhapatnam, 12 NDRF teams worked to clean up fallen trees and debris on roads and 5,000 workers from power companies worked to restore electricity in the city on 14 October. Higher temperatures in the city in the months following the cyclone caused a 60 percent decrease in its bird population as they moved elsewhere or died. Andhra Pradesh's chief minister, N. Chandrababu Naidu, said that 70% of communications were down and urged residents to remain in their homes. To assist with relief efforts, 24 NDRF and 155 medical teams were sent to the affected areas. The Indian Navy led a military operation named Lehar to help citizens affected by Hudhud and placed 20 rescue teams in Visakhapatnam, while the Indian Army sent 25 rescue teams. The Indian Coast Guard sent 17 ships, and the Indian Air Force readied seven aircraft.

Equipped with night glasses and other supplies, 300 members of the ODRAF worked on clearing uprooted large trees and poles from roads. Naidu sought ₹20,000,000,000 (US$327.71 million) from the central government, while the government of Odisha sought ₹7,771,200,000 (US$127.34 million) and also requested a team to assess damages in the state. Inland fisheries in Dhubri, Assam benefited from increased hilsa catch as the fish were driven from the stormy ocean. According to a United Nations report in 2015, Hudhud caused $11 billion in damages.

== See also ==
- 1977 Andhra Pradesh cyclone
- 1999 Odisha cyclone
- Cyclone Phailin
- Cyclone Fani
- Tropical cyclones in India
