= Weather of 2026 =

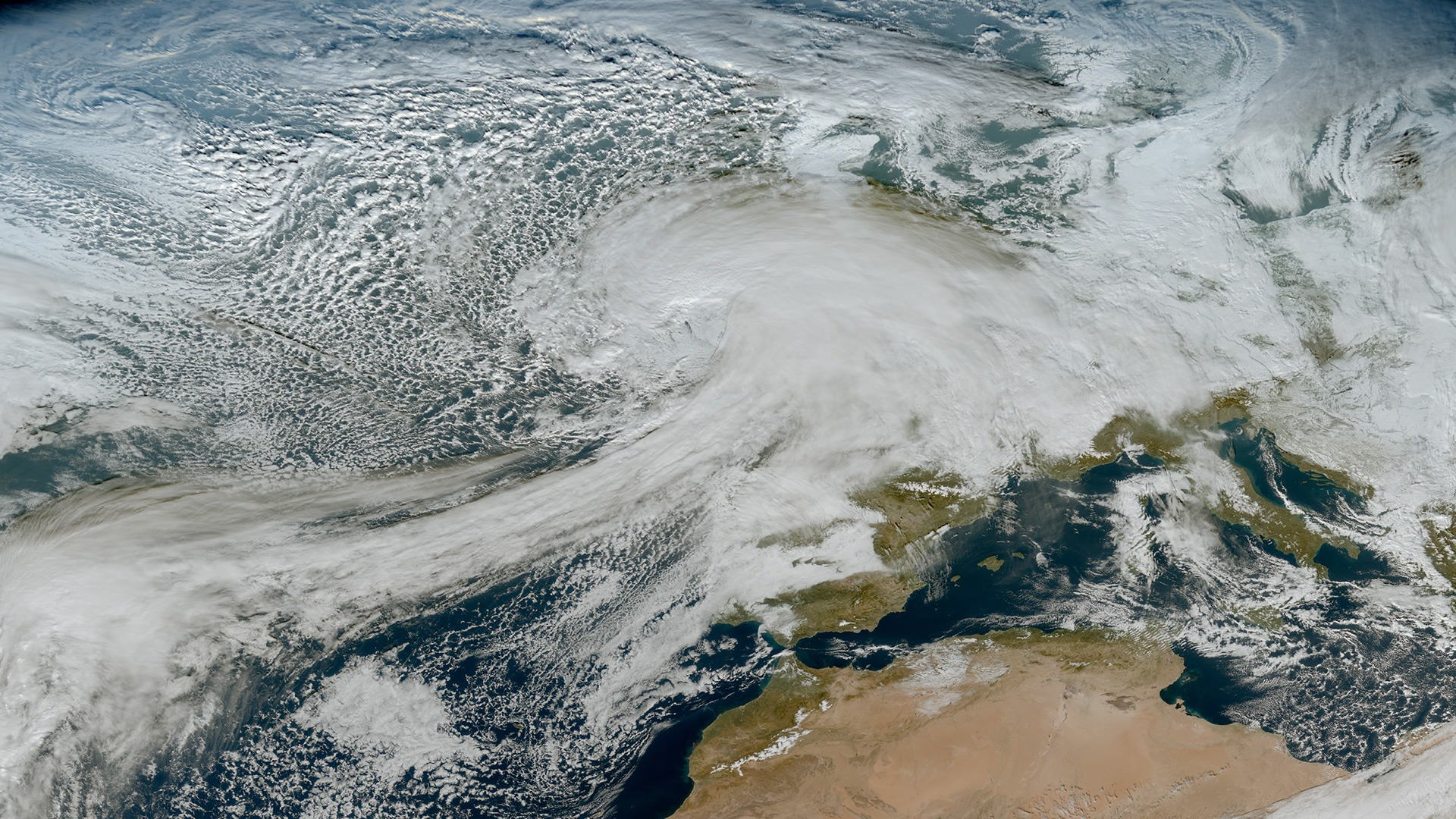
Storm Goretti was an extremely powerful extratropical cyclone that impacted Western Europe in early January 2026.

The following is a list of weather events that occurred on Earth in the year 2026.

== El Niño ==
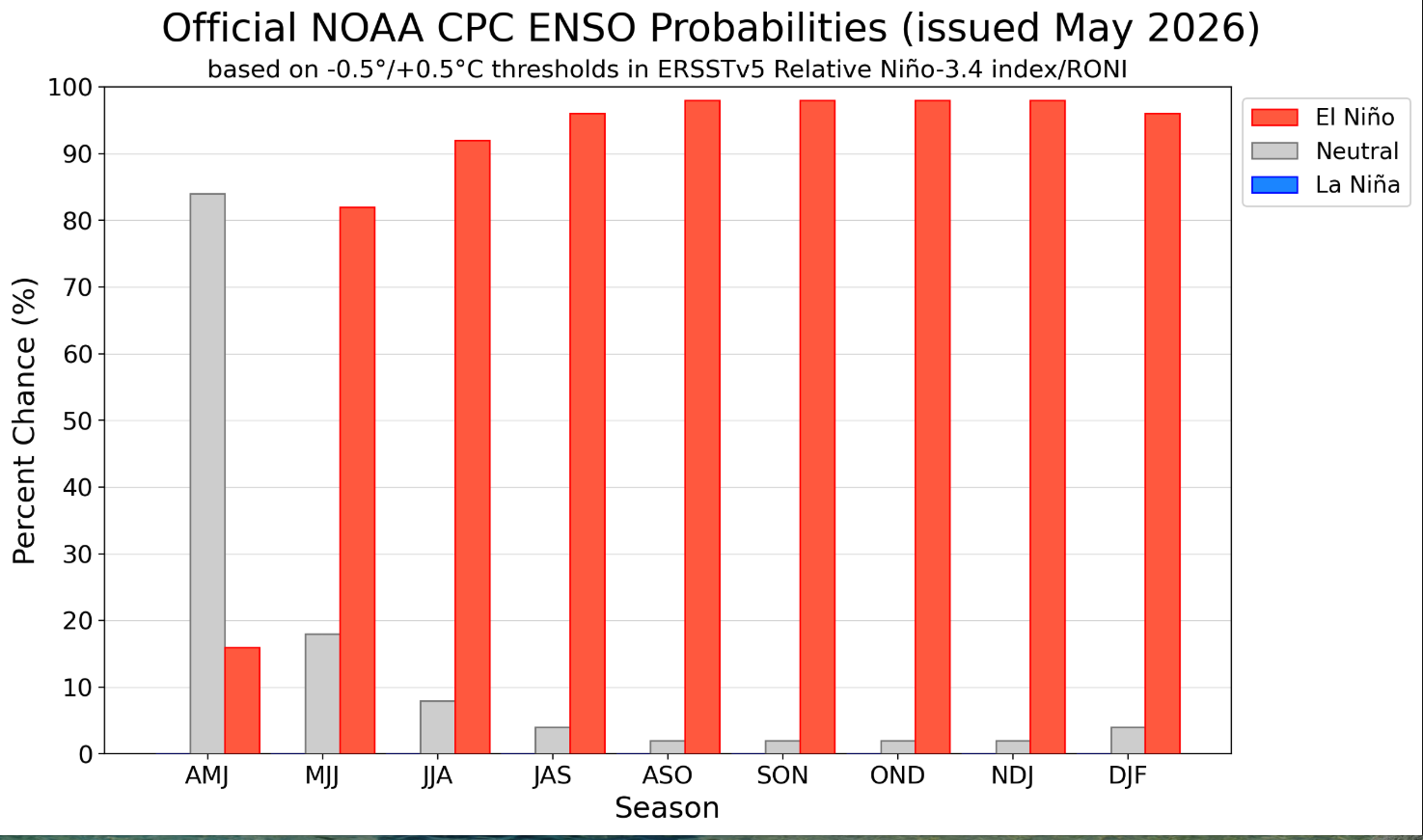
Official NOAA CPC ENSO probabilities as of May 2026

A weak La Niña event evolved to ENSO-neutral in early 2026, but by May was "rapidly transitioning" to El Niño, according to Columbia University's Climate School. Computer modeling in late May by the US National Oceanic and Atmospheric Administration (NOAA) suggested the development of an El Niño event was likely by the July through September peak of the Pacific hurricane season. The Center for Climate Systems Research (CCSR) and the International Research Institute for Climate and Society (IRI) ENSO plume forecast gave a 98% probability of El Niño forming and a 97%-98% probability of continuing through the end of the year, a range Columbia called "remarkably high and narrow".

On June 2 the United Nations World Meteorological Organization confirmed "that El Niño conditions are developing in the tropical Pacific and are expected to influence weather and climate patterns around the world in the months ahead." In June, the European Centre for Medium-Range Weather Forecasts released a forecast of a central equatorial Pacific Ocean temperature anomaly of 3–4 °C (5.4–7.2 °F), which would make it the strongest on record. On 19 September 2026, in the central equatorial Pacific Ocean Niño 3.4 region, the average ocean temperature reached 3.05 °C (5.49 °F) above average—the largest temperature anomaly on record. In September, the Climate Impact Lab projected that in the ensuing six months, 451,000 more lives would be lost due to heat than in a normal year.

== Global conditions ==
June 2026 global average sea surface temperatures reached an all-time record high for the month of June, with 2026's spring temperatures being exceeded only in spring of 2024. Global average sea surface temperatures reached a new July high (20.96 °C (69.73 °F), beating 2023's high of 20.89 °C (69.60 °F)), partly fueled by developing El Niño conditions in the Pacific Ocean. On 22 August, global average sea surface temperature reached 21.1 °C (70.0 °F), its highest level on record, exceeding the March 2024 record. Such temperatures are typically highest in March and April, following the austral summer.

August 2026 had the warmest global surface temperature of any month on record: 1.65 °C above pre-industrial levels. The Copernicus Climate Change Service reported that Earth's atmosphere held more water vapour in August 2026 than any other month on record, increasing the risk of extreme heat and rainfall around the world.

== Deadliest events ==
Deadliest meteorological events during 2026
Rank	Event	Date(s)	Deaths (+Missing)	Refs
1	2026 European heatwaves	May 24 – September	50,391+ (in urban areas only)	
2	2026 Nepal–Tibet floods	August 26	1,494+ (6,669+)	
3	Storm Harry	January 16–23	390	
4	January 2026 Southern Africa floods (Mozambique·Zimbabwe)	January 12–25	200+	
5	January 2026 North American winter storm	January 22–30	174 (1)	
6	Severe Tropical Storm Maysak	July 1–7	159+ (10+)	
7	Deep Depression BOB 06	September 21–27	131	
8	2026 Kenya floods	March 6 - May 31	112	
9	2026 Uttar Pradesh storm	May 13	111+	
10	2026 West Bandung landslide	January 24	80 (20)	

== Types ==
=== Cold snaps and winter storms ===
From January 22–27, a deadly winter storm affected Northern Mexico, United States and Atlantic Canada, causing many warnings, freezing temperatures and more than 170 deaths over the area. On January 28, the storm moved out to the open Atlantic Ocean, followed by another storm which affected almost all the same regions.

=== Tornadoes ===
==== January ====
On January 4, a tornado struck the Frattocchie area in Marino, Italy, after reportedly coming from the sea. 30 trees were downed, and several structures and vehicles sustained damage. The tornado was rated as an IF1.5 on the International Fujita scale. A few days later, a small tornado event occurred in Oklahoma early on January 8, with five tornadoes being confirmed, one of which was rated EF2 after it tore the roof off of a house southwest of Purcell. This tornado caused one injury along its path when it rolled a semi-truck as it crossed I–35 in the southern part of the Oklahoma City metropolitan area. That day, a significant tornado struck the town of Kalpaki, Greece. The tornado destroyed a farm, killing 30 to 40 thousand chickens. Two other buildings were heavily damaged, with partially collapsed walls, the tornado was rated as an IF2 tornado on the International Fujita Scale. Two days later, a tornado struck the city of São José dos Pinhais, Brazil. The tornado wrecked a warehouse and damaged at least 350 homes, as well as several walls, utility poles, and trees. An estimated 1,200 people were impacted, with two families being displaced and two people lightly injured. The winds reached an estimated 180 km/h (112 mph), and the tornado rated a low-end F2.

=== Tropical and subtropical cyclones ===
Tropical cyclones are primarily monitored by 9 warning centers around the world, which are designated as a Regional Specialized Meteorological Center (RSMC) or a Tropical Cyclone Warning Center (TCWC) by the World Meteorological Organization (WMO). These centers are: National Hurricane Center (NHC), Japan Meteorological Agency (JMA), Indian Meteorological Department (IMD), Météo-France (MFR), Indonesia's Meteorology, Climatology, and Geophysical Agency (BMKG), Australian Bureau of Meteorology (BoM), Papua New Guinea's National Weather Service (PNGNWS), Fiji Meteorological Service (FMS), and New Zealand's MetService. Unofficial, but still notable, warning centers include the Philippine Atmospheric, Geophysical and Astronomical Services Administration (PAGASA; albeit official within the Philippines), the United States's Joint Typhoon Warning Center (JTWC), and the Brazilian Navy Hydrographic Center.

Through 10 September—normally the peak of the Atlantic hurricane season—not a single Atlantic hurricane had formed, marking the latest season start since weather satellites were launched in the 1960s. In contrast, the Pacific was hyperactive, due to El Niño conditions.

=== Extratropical cyclones and European windstorms ===
Storm Anna caused widespread chaos at Amsterdam Airport Schiphol, particularly on January 2, 2026, where a combination of heavy snow and shifting crosswinds led to the cancellation of over 325 flights and delayed more than 635 others. The disruption at Schiphol hit KLM and easyJet hardest, with KLM alone cancelling roughly 30% of its schedule due to the airport's reduced runway capacity. The storm brought wind gusts of up to 90 km/h (56 mph) along the northern coast of the Netherlands. In Sweden, meteorologists recorded extreme accumulations, with up to 50 cm (20 in) of snow falling in parts of central Sweden on New Year's Day and January 2, leaving thousands of households without power. In the Netherlands and Germany, the storm's tail end brought freezing rain and black ice, leading to hazardous road conditions and the deployment of specialized snow removal equipment like the Lavastorm truck on major highways. Meanwhile, in Poland, the storm's heavy snow paralyzed the S7 motorway, leaving hundreds of travelers stranded in sub-zero temperatures with traffic jams stretching up to 20 km (12 mi).

Between 5 and 8 May 2026, an intense cut-off low-pressure system stalled over South Africa, triggering the South African Weather Service to issue its highest-impact Orange Level 8 warnings for the Eastern and Western Cape. The system delivered extreme rainfall, with Joubertina recording 301.2 mm (11.86 in) in three days, while the Kouga Dam saw an unprecedented rise from 32% to over 113% capacity in 24 hours. These torrential downpours resulted in widespread flash flooding that inundated homes, destroyed critical road infrastructure, and forced the emergency evacuation of over 2,000 residents in the Gamtoos Valley. Beyond the flooding, the storm brought gale-force winds and dangerous coastal surges, claiming at least one life in Knysna and leaving several communities in the Garden Route and Karoo completely isolated until the system finally moved offshore on 8 May.

=== Wildfires ===
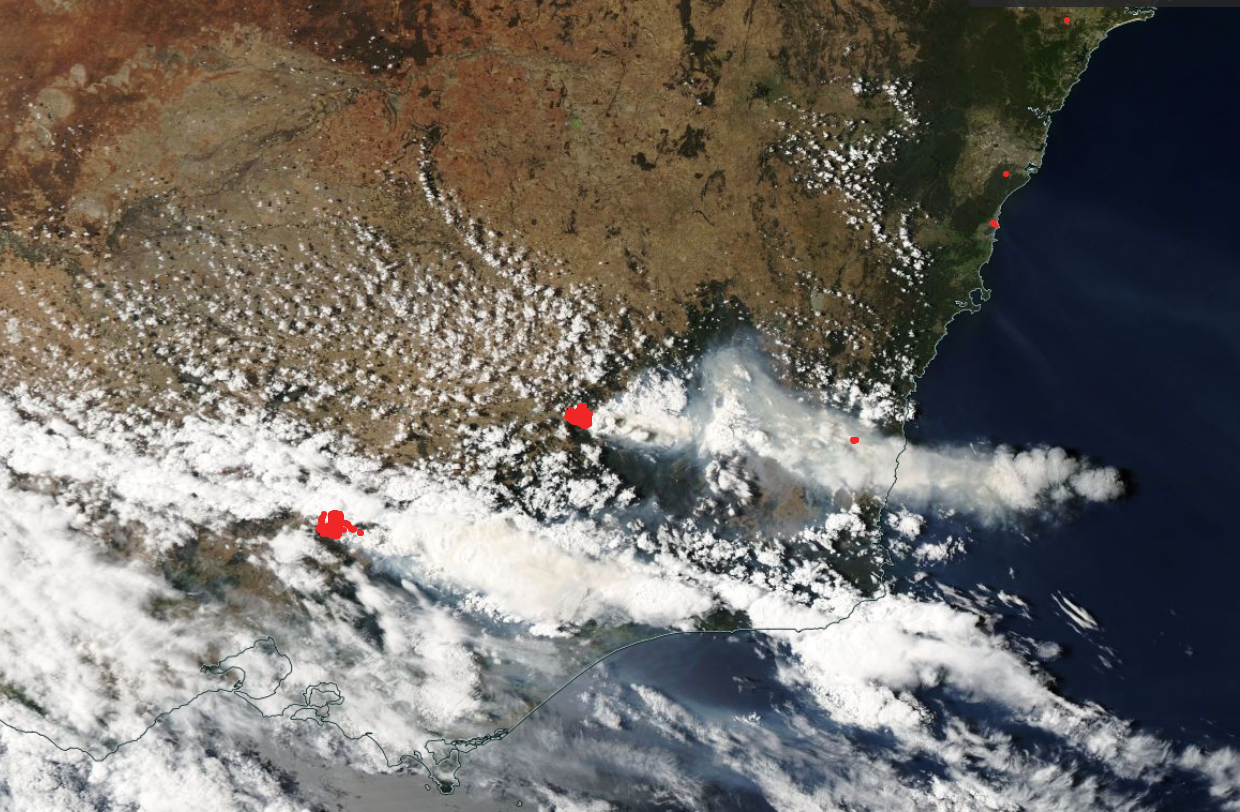
Satellite imagery of Victoria (Australia), showing smoke plumes from fires on 9 January 2026.

Fires from January to April 2026 burned more than 150 million ha (370 million acres) of land—20% more than the previous record.

==== Australia ====
On January 7, extreme conditions in Victoria, Australia, allowed for a massive fire outbreak, burning over 300 thousand ha (740 thousand acres), destroying over 300 structures, and resulting in one death.

==== Chile ====
From 16 January 2026, major wildfires burned in the regions of Biobío and Ñuble, destroying at least 800 structures, resulting in over 50,000 forced to evacuate and 21 fatalities.

=== Heatwaves ===
Heat storms—generally defined as heat waves of long duration and covering wide areas—have increased in recent decades, under one definition growing from five per year in the 1960s to 102 per year in the 2020s through September 2026. Spikes in heat storms have often followed within months after El Niño events.

A study published in the Proceedings of the National Academy of Sciences said that exceptionally low 2025 and 2026 arctic ice extent indicate that 20-year arctic sea ice decline was "becoming significant again" after a period in which such declines had been insignificant.

In late January, much of Australia experienced a prolonged, extreme heatwave, with 12 locations recording temperatures above 49 °C (120 °F), and two, Andamooka and Port Augusta reaching 50 °C (122 °F) on 29 and 30 January.

World Weather Attribution said that, even considering the progress of global warming, March 2026 heatwaves in Western North America were "rare events" that would have been "virtually impossible" without human-induced climate change.

In March, NASA reported that, for the second consecutive year winter arctic sea ice declined, matching the lowest level since records began in 1979.

NOAA's NCEI reported that the contiguous U.S. (CONUS) average temperature in March 2026 was 5.2 °C (9.4 °F) above the 20th century average—the warmest March in the 132-year record. Also, the year from April 2025 to March 2026 was deemed to be the warmest ever recorded for the CONUS in records since 1895, and January–March 2026 was the driest on record for the CONUS.

In May, a historic intense "heat dome" of high pressure trapping warm air from Northern Africa shattered all-time May national temperature records across Western Europe. A study by extreme event attribution organisation Climameter ascribed the high temperatures of the May 2026 Western European Heatwave to human-driven climate change, with natural climate variability likely playing a minor role. This happened again in June with many western and central European countries recording record temperatures, with large swathes under red warnings for heat. Extreme heat conditions persisted through July, with a third major heatwave affecting Western and Northern Europe in early July, followed by a fourth heatwave beginning on 28 July. The sustained high temperatures combined with extreme precipitation deficits—with parts of southern England receiving less than 1% of average July rainfall—led to flash drought conditions across the region and prompted the Environment Agency to officially declare drought status across more than half of England on 29 July. An October 2026 Imperial College London study estimated 50,391 heat-related excess deaths across 854 European cities during the summer, with around two thirds attributable to anthropogenic climate change.

In June, an Antarctic heatwave reached temperatures of nearly 60 °F (16 °C)—which is 36 °F (20 °C) above normal—leading to widespread ice thawing and rain falling on glaciers.

=== Drought ===
The Southwestern North American megadrought

The water level of Lake Powell has declined from near maximum capacity to a new low within 30 feet (9.1 m) of the minimum level needed for Glen Canyon Dam to generate electricity.

The water level of Lake Mead has declined from near maximum capacity to a new low within 100 feet (30 m) of the minimum level needed for Hoover Dam to generate electricity.

- Warm rivers and low water levels caused nuclear power plants to reduce output across Europe, affecting grids and energy prices on critical days.

== Timeline ==
=== January ===
- January 4 – A tornado struck the Frattocchie area in Marino, Italy, after reportedly coming from the sea. 30 trees were downed, and several structures and vehicles sustained damage. The tornado was rated as an IF1.5 on the International Fujita scale.
- January 5–10 – Southeastern Australia experiences its most severe heatwave since 2019; temperatures exceed 40 °C (104 °F) in Melbourne and Sydney, while regional Victoria and New South Wales face "extreme" fire danger ratings.
- January 8–9 – La Farge, Wisconsin, recorded 2.29 inches (58 mm) of rain, a record 24-hour amount for January.
- January 15 – Two people died due to severe winter storms in the Russian Far East.
- January 15–22 – 10 people died due to landslides and flooding caused by heavy rainfall during a storm which devastated parts of the North Island of New Zealand.
- January 22–27 – A major winter storm crossed the United States and Atlantic Canada causing more than 173 fatalities.
- January 20-February 3 - Multiple rounds of snow across Japan resulted in 30 fatalities throughout late January. One such snowstorm resulted in the closure of New Chitose Airport. Train services were also cancelled during the outburst of snow, while several highways were closed. Snowfall throughout those two weeks resulted in Aomori reached 7 feet (2.1 m).

=== February ===
- February 21-24 - A winter storm swept through Mongolia. The storm brought heavy snow, winds as fast as 31 metres per second (69 mph), and temperatures as low as −48 °C (−54 °F). The storm led to 5 fatalities and 56 injuries.

=== March ===
- March 6 – present – Destructive flooding in Kenya causes 110 fatalities, with most of the victims dying mainly from drowning or electrocution.
- March 10–24 – A series of Kona storms produced damaging floods in Hawaii, after thunderstorms produced heavy rainfall peaking at 54.92 inches (1,395 mm) on Maui. The floods caused more than US$1 billion in damage.

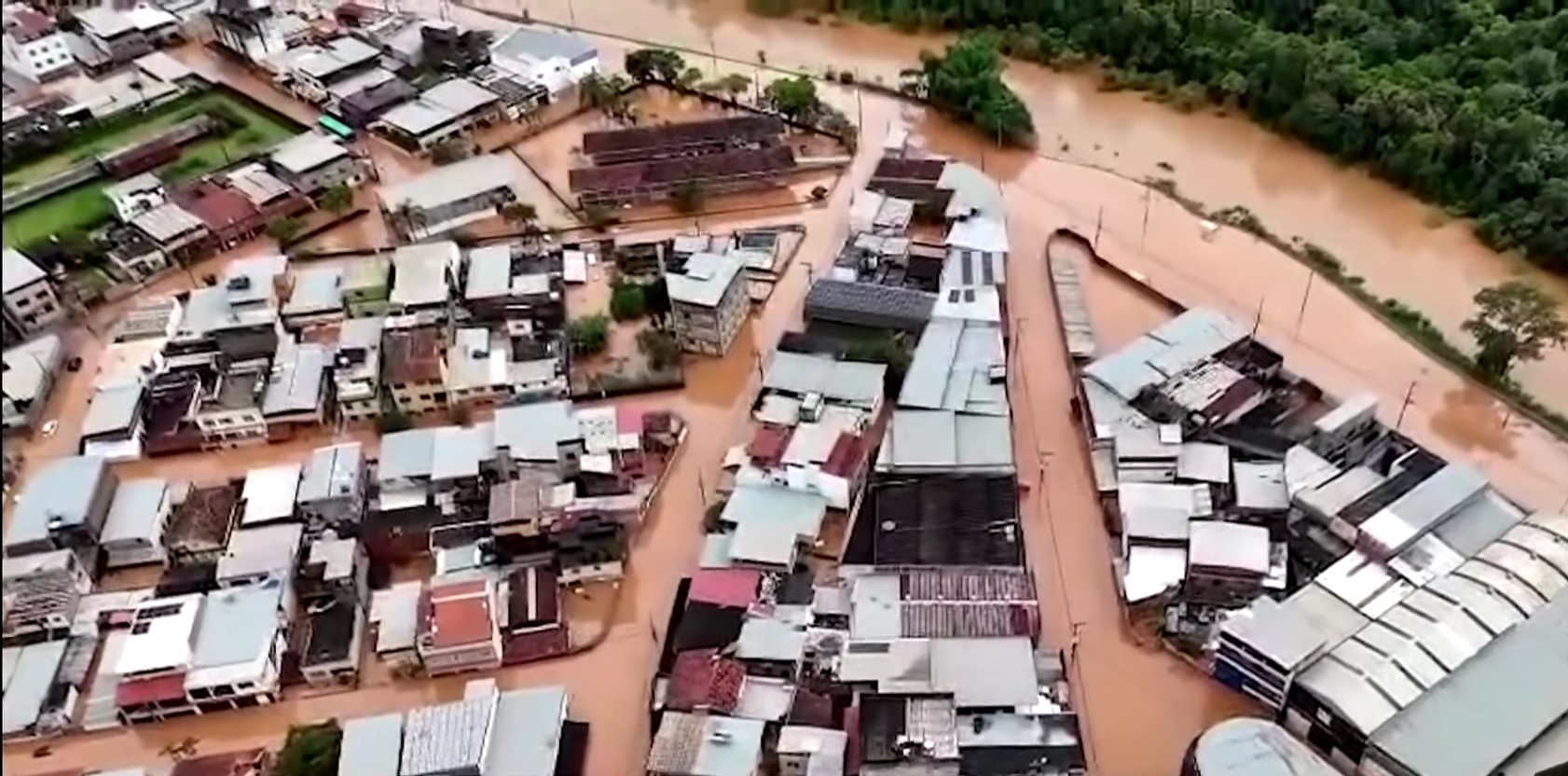
Flooding on the banks of the Paraibuna River in the Industrial neighborhood, Juiz de Fora

- March 12 – Intense localised rainfall triggers severe flooding and landslides across the Minas Gerais state in Brazil, resulting in more than 70 fatalities; the city of Juiz de Fora records its wettest month on record.
- March 13–17 – The March 2026 North American blizzard affects much of the Upper Midwest and High Plains with up to 3–4 feet (36–48 in; 91–122 cm) of snow, and causes an ice storm over northern Michigan. This was the first winter storm to be rated as a Category 5 on the Regional Snowfall Index in ten years.
- March 20 – The previous U.S. national heat record of 108 °F (42 °C) for the month of March was broken with a temperature of 112 °F (44 °C) at Buttercup and Squaw Lake in California.
- March 20–27 – Cyclone Narelle landfalls four times around Australia in Queensland, Northern Territory, and Western Australia.

=== April ===
- April 7 – Severe flooding in Dagestan, Russia, kills six people and inundates over 6,000 homes.
- April 23–28 – A tornado outbreak sequence affects the Plains and the Midwest. Multiple tornado watches and warnings were issued during the afternoon and evening, and a tornado emergency was issued for southern Enid, when an EF4 tornado caused extreme damage to multiple houses and other structures on April 23, injuring 1 person.

=== May ===
- The Copernicus Climate Change Service concluded that May 2026 was the second warmest May globally since records began in 1850.
- May 2-4 A large tornado outbreak occurred in Turkey. It consisted of 7 IF2's, 1 IF2.5 and one violent IF4 in Akçamezra, Turkey which started off in Northern Syria. Many houses were destroyed, and multiple emergency services arrived to Northeastern Turkey as many become homeless, or get injured by hail, wind, and possibly tornadoes. This is the strongest tornado outbreak in all of Turkey and Syria.
- May 5–6 – A severe wildfire in the Lublin region of south-eastern Poland burns over 250 hectares of forest in Kozaki, resulting in the death of a firefighting pilot during an aircraft crash.
- May 5–8 – An intense cut-off low-pressure system battered South Africa, triggering Orange Level 8 weather warnings for disruptive rain and flooding. The storm caused widespread infrastructure damage and evacuations in the Eastern Cape and Garden Route, with rainfall totals exceeding 300 mm (12 in) in Joubertina. The Kouga Dam exceeds its capacity (113%), leading to mass evacuations in the Gamtoos Valley.
- May 5–6 – A late season winter storm affects the Rocky Mountains. Cheyenne, Wyoming received 8.9 inches (23 cm) of snow, their heaviest of the season and the highest since March 2021, while the Boulder, Colorado office of the NWS recorded 10.7 inches (27 cm), the heaviest May snowstorm since 2013. Higher accumulations of 18–24 inches (46–61 cm) occurred in the mountainous peaks, with Estes Park reporting as much as 27 inches (69 cm).
- May 6–7 – A tornado outbreak affects the Southeastern United States. Four tornado emergencies were issued in southwestern Mississippi, along with several other PDS tornado warnings.
- May 13 – A series of deadly and destructive thunderstorms swept across Uttar Pradesh, India, causing 96 deaths and 72 injuries.
- May 13 – Honduras repeatedly broke its all-time May maximum temperature records when Choluteca recorded a scorching 42.2 °C (108.0 °F).
- May 25–26 – England, Wales and Northern Ireland all broke their all-time maximum temperature for May. A temperature of 34.8 °C (94.6 °F) was recorded in Kew Gardens, beating the old record from 1922 and 1944 of 32.8 °C (91.0 °F); and it also broke the records for the UK's hottest low temperature for any given day in May and the UK's hottest bank holiday ever. The next day this was broken again where 35.1 °C (95.2 °F) was recorded again at Kew Gardens.

=== June ===
- June 2 – The United Nations World Meteorological Organization (WMO) officially confirmed that El Niño conditions are actively developing in the tropical Pacific. This rapid transition follows a remarkably high 97–98% probability forecast from Columbia University's Climate School. Computer modeling points to an equatorial Pacific temperature anomaly of 3–4 °C (5.4–7.2 °F), threatening to make this the strongest El Niño event on record and heavily altering global weather patterns for the remainder of the year.
- June 11 – A National Oceanic and Atmospheric Administration notice stated that "El Niño conditions are present and expected to strengthen into the Northern Hemisphere winter 2026-27".
- June 11 – A moderately sized but intense tornado outbreak occurred in Illinois and Indiana, with an EF3 near Washburn, and two EF3 tornadoes in Streator and Kouts. No fatalities have been reported.
- June 17–18 – Tropical Storm Arthur makes landfall near the shorelines of Texas and Louisiana, causing flash flooding and four fatalities.
- June 22–27 – A historic and intense heat dome brought a ferocious, life-threatening heatwave to Western and Central Europe, including the United Kingdom, France, Spain, Italy, and Germany. Red weather alerts were widely issued across the continent as temperatures broke June records; Châteaumeillant, France recorded a peak temperature of 43.3 °C (109.9 °F), while parts of Spain were forecast to hit 44 °C (111 °F). The extreme heat caused dozens of direct fatalities, including over 40 drowning deaths in France as people sought relief from the stifling conditions.
- June 29 – Straight line winds of 131 mph (211 km/h) occurred in Highmore, South Dakota, the second highest wind gust from a thunderstorm wind gust ever recorded. These extreme winds occurred within a supercell. This likely occurred from a downburst. No fatalities have been reported from this event.

=== July ===
- July 2-15 – Typhoon Bavi forms 901 nmi (1,669 km; 1,037 mi) east-southeast of Kwajalein, where it began to undergo extreme rapid intensification tracking upwards from 157 to 194 km/h (98 to 121 mph) in a mere six-hour window. Bavi passed extremely close to the northern coast of the island of Rota early on July 6, becoming one of the strongest typhoons in history to affect the Northern Mariana Islands.
- July 3-15 – An intense ridge of high pressure triggers the third atmospheric heatwave of the year across southern England, pushing temperatures to 35 °C (95 °F). Simultaneously, an "extreme" Category 3 to 4 marine heatwave develops in the English Channel and North Sea, with sea surface temperatures spiking up to 5 °C (9.0 °F) above average. Temperatures peaked at 35 °C (95 °F) or higher during this stretch. This officially marked the first time in the UK's weather record that 35 °C or higher was recorded across three consecutive months (May, June, and July) in a single year. By July 10, the Met Office recorded a record eight days exceeding 34 °C, surpassing the historic summer benchmarks of 1976 and 2020. Red Health-Heat Alerts were issued across sections of England and Wales due to high humidity spiking the heat index and threatening critical transport and health infrastructure.
- July 5–7 – Severe Tropical Storm Maysak struck northeastern Vietnam and southern China, triggering catastrophic flooding across the Guangxi and Hubei provinces. The storm forced more than 130,000 evacuations and unleashed severe thunderstorms and tornadoes that caused widespread destruction, leaving at least 23 people dead and hundreds injured.
- July 6 - A powerful winter blocking high settles over Tasmania, recording a mean sea level pressure of 1,044.5 hPa (30.84 inHg) at Ouse. This provisionally breaks the record for the highest atmospheric pressure ever recorded in Australia, surpassing the previous record of 1,044.3 hPa set at Launceston on 7 June 1967.
- July 7-9 – Storm Bernadette, named by the Free University of Berlin, sweeps across Poland with 30 mm (1.2 in) of rain and 80 km/h (50 mph) winds. The storm breaks a regional heatwave but causes extensive hail damage to sugar beet crops in the Wielkopolska region, threatening Central European wholesale sugar prices and prompting early signals of government financial aid for farmers.
- July 7 - An exceptionally deep extratropical cyclone tracks across the South Atlantic Ocean, bringing destructive, hurricane-force winds to the remote island of Tristan da Cunha. An automatic weather station mounted at St Mary's School in Edinburgh of the Seven Seas records a peak wind gust of 200 km/h (124 mph; 108 kn). The storm causes widespread structural damage throughout the settlement; the official Residency suffers a partial roof collapse and heavy interior damage after being struck by a flying longboat torn from its tie-downs, while several other government and community buildings, including the island's biosecurity facility, are completely unroofed. No casualties are reported.
- July 8 – Intense monsoon downpours cause severe flash flooding and urban inundation across Delhi, Mumbai, and Pune. The torrential rainfall triggers fatal structural collapses and a major landfill slide, causing multiple casualties and halting regional rail and road networks.
- July 12-17 - Torrential rains hit southeastern Bangladesh and northeastern India. On 15 July, Chattogram recorded 412.3 mm (16.23 in) of rain in 24 hours—its highest single-day July total in 42 years—displacing over one million people.
- July 14-15 - Violent thunderstorms, large hail, and torrential rain swept across southern Germany. Nuremberg, Fürth, and Reutlingen were hardest hit. Nuremberg emergency services fielded over 3,000 emergency calls in just five hours. The severe weather temporarily forced Nuremberg Airport to halt all flight operations due to a flooded airfield, downed trees, and roof damage.
- July 14–16 – Slow-moving thunderstorms dump up to 711 mm (28 in) of rain over south-central Texas, causing the Guadalupe River to rise 9 m (30 ft) in under three hours, resulting in two drowning deaths and over 230 water rescues.
- July 14–18 – A powerful, Category 5 atmospheric river impacts central Chile and the Andes mountain range, bringing a historic winter blizzard. The Chilean government issues emergency declarations for high-altitude transport corridors. Over a 48-hour peak period ending July 18, the Portillo, Chile ski resort records 2.7 metres (9 feet) of snow, while Valle Nevado logs 1.6 metres (over 5 feet) of snowfall, forcing a total suspension of mountain operations due to severe avalanche risks.
- 19–24 July – Tropical Storm Bertha the second named storm of the 2026 Atlantic hurricane season formed in the north-eastern Gulf of Mexico and impacted Gulf coast states, with coastal flooding and gusty winds.
- July 19–20 – Severe monsoonal flash flooding near Bicknell, Utah, sweeps away vehicles at Sunglow Campground, resulting in five fatalities.
- July 20–21 – Torrential monsoonal thunderstorms trigger severe flash flooding across Tucson and Nogales, Arizona, resulting in seven deaths.
- July 20-22 – Intense, localised mountain rainfall in Afghanistan triggered sudden flash floods that swept down steep valleys into Parun City killing 26 people.
- July 21 – Heavy rainfall dumping up to 127 mm (5.0 in) in under six hours causes historic flooding across West Virginia, breaking a 1985 stream gauge record near Buckhannon and prompting a statewide State of Emergency.
- July 26–28 – A persistent heat dome brought severe conditions across wide swaths of the Central and Southern United States, with heat index values exceeding 100 °F (38 °C) affecting over 40 million people. Severe convective storms fired up along the periphery of the heat dome, triggering severe thunderstorm and flash flood alerts across portions of the Great Lakes and Mid-Atlantic regions.
- July 27–30 – Heavy monsoonal rain triggers rapid flash flooding at the Shuangshimen scenic area in Gansu Province, China, resulting in 10 deaths and 23 injuries.
- July 27–30 – A fourth wave of extreme heat swept across Western and Southern Europe, worsening widespread drought and extreme wildfire conditions. In France, the wave brought renewed high temperatures across the southwest, fueling a massive wildfire in the Gironde department near Bordeaux that has, so far consumed over 42,000 hectares (103,000 acres) and forced the evacuation of more than 220,000 people. In Spain, national weather agency AEMET issued extreme heat warnings as temperatures surged past 42 °C (107.6 °F) in the northeast and central regions, complicating efforts to control major blazes west of Madrid. Extreme heat advisories were also triggered across Portugal, Hungary, Slovakia, and the Czech Republic as the heat dome expanded eastward.
- July 28–30 – Heavy coastal rainfall exceeding 100 mm (3.9 in) triggers localised flooding and road infrastructure collapse along South Africa's southeastern coast near KuGompo (East London).
- July 29 - The Environment Agency of the United Kingdom officially moved seven of its 14 regions—comprising 51.4% of England—into formal drought status. The designated zones include London, East Anglia, Hertfordshire, the Thames Valley, Hampshire and the Isle of Wight, Devon and Cornwall, the West Midlands, and Wessex.

=== August ===
- August 1–4 – A broad heat dome produced extreme heat across Northern Africa and the Sahel, with daily high temperatures consistently exceeding 45 °C (113 °F) across regions of Algeria, Mali, and Sudan.
- August 3-4 – A prolonged heatwave in East Asia set national and regional heat records. South Korea activated its highest-level heatwave warning after Yangsan recorded a national record-breaking 42.5 °C (108.5 °F) on 2 August.
- August 5 – The World Meteorological Organization (WMO) issued a global seasonal update confirming that a developing El Niño event—2026–2027 El Niño—combined with positive Indian Ocean Dipole conditions and record-warm global sea surface temperatures, is projected to drive above-normal temperatures globally throughout the August–October season.
- August 6 - Slovakia recorded its highest national August temperature in history, reaching 42 °C (107.6 °F) in Dolné Plachtince.
- August 6 – An intense F3/IF3 tornado struck Pedro Osório in Rio Grande do Sul, Brazil, causing extensive damage to homes, greenhouses, and infrastructure. Generated by a quasi-linear convective system (QLCS) associated with an extratropical cyclone over Uruguay, it became one of the most severe tornadic events in the region in 2026.
- August 8 - Typhoon Dolphin tracked through the Ryukyu Islands near Okinawa, grounding all domestic and international flights at Naha Airport, causing 6 indirect fatalities so far, and prompting sea warnings across the Taiwan Strait and northern Taiwan.
- August 9–13 – A major heatwave swept across Western Europe. Temperatures peaked at 43.5 °C (110.3 °F) in Córdoba, Spain, and reached 41.2 °C (106.2 °F) in Nîmes, France. In the United Kingdom, temperatures peaked at 38.1 °C (100.6 °F) at Kew Gardens, London on August 13, marking the highest temperature recorded in the UK during the summer of 2026 amid an ongoing regional flash drought.
- August 11-14 - The Met Office issued an Amber Extreme Heat warning for parts of Southern, Eastern, and Central England, forecasting temperatures peaking between 37 °C (99 °F) and 38 °C (100 °F) on 13 August, alongside widespread Amber Heat-Health Alerts across all regions of England issued by the UK Health Security Agency.
- August 11 - A severe severe mesoscale convective system organised into a derecho over the US Upper Midwest, sweeping from eastern Iowa across Illinois and Indiana with straight-line wind gusts up to 100 mph (160 km/h) in Gary, Indiana, causing widespread structural damage, downed power lines, and power outages for hundreds of thousands of residents.
- August 13-15 - Torrential downpours from a severe atmospheric system impacted eastern Japan, triggering severe flash flooding and landslides. On August 13, the Japan Meteorological Agency issued a Level 5 emergency heavy rain warning for over a third of municipalities in Chiba Prefecture for the first time on record. Up to 115 millimetres (4.5 in) of rain fell in an hour in Chiba City, with three-hour rainfall totals reaching 189.5 mm (7.46 in) in Sakura. The deluge left 10 people dead, caused over 45,000 power outages, flooded more than 1,000 homes, and left nearly 7,000 travelers stranded overnight at Narita International Airport.
- August 13-16 - Historic flooding swept central Indiana in the United States following days of rainfall exceeding 280 mm (11 in). The White River crested at 24.9 feet (7.6 m) in Anderson and Noblesville, breaking previous records set during the Great Flood of 1913. The disaster caused at least seven fatalities, forced 350 boat evacuations, washed out critical roads, and cut power to 128,000 residents.
- August 13-30 - Hurricane Lala formed in the Central Pacific on August 13 and intensified into a Category 1 hurricane on August 15 as it approached Hawaii. On August 16, the eyewall grazed the southern coast of the Big Island, delivering localized wind gusts up to 140 mph (230 km/h) atop Mauna Kea and dumping over 3.5 ft (1.1 m) of rainfall in windward areas. The system brought severe flash flooding, washed away over 100 homes in coastal communities such as Nāʻālehu and Waiʻōhinu, damaged six bridges, and left approximately 184,000 customers without power across the state before tracking westward into the open ocean.
- August 16-17 - Unseasonal torrential night-time precipitation impacted southern coastal regions of Peru. In southern Lima, persistent downpours flooded more than 60 dwellings, three schools, and local markets across Villa El Salvador and Chorrillos, causing widespread drainage system overflows and emergency power cuts.
- August 17 - Torrential monsoonal downpours in South Korea triggered major flash flooding and mudslides across Geoje and southern coastal regions. Almost one metre (3.3 ft) of rain fell within 24 hours, triggering a deadly landslide that struck an apartment building, resulting in one fatality, widespread power outages, and hundreds of emergency evacuations.
- August 20-22 - A severe convective outbreak across Western and Central Europe produced destructive tornadic activity in Germany. Three confirmed tornadoes struck parts of Lower Saxony and North Rhine-Westphalia, causing severe structural damage to residential areas, downing high-voltage power corridors, and resulting in two fatalities and multiple injuries.
- August 22 - Global sea surface temperatures outside the polar regions reached a record daily average of 21.10 °C (69.98 °F) according to data from the Copernicus Climate Change Service, surpassing previous records driven by an intensifying El Niño and underlying global warming.
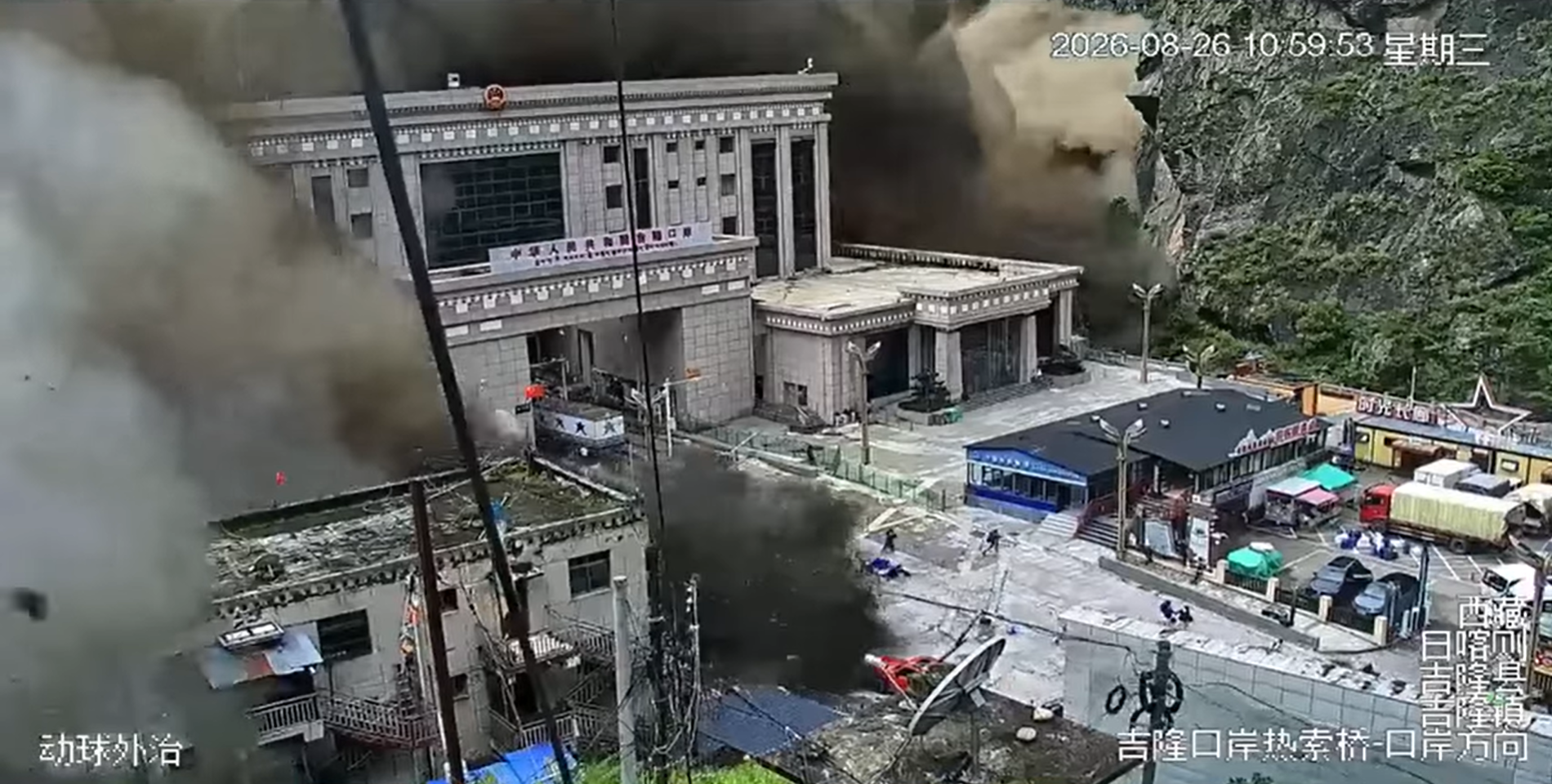
  Flood hitting the Gyirong Port crossing on the China–Nepal border seven minutes after a 5.2 tremor
- August 26 - A catastrophic glacier collapse or ice avalanche near Langtang Lirung in Nepal triggers a massive debris flow along the Trishuli River (Bhotekoshi). The initial mass movement registers as a 5.2 earthquake. The resulting flash flood travels over 80 km (50 mi) downstream, destroying the Gyirong Port border complex and devastating Nepal's Rasuwa District and Nuwakot District. As of 20 September death toll has rose to 1,494+ and over 6,669 missing across Nepal and Tibet.
- August 27 – Supercell thunderstorms in southern France give rise to a tornado near Pomas, causing structural damage to residential roofs and farm properties.
- August 29 – Severe flash flooding along Bright Angel Creek in the Grand Canyon destroys inner canyon footbridges and infrastructure, killing at least two people and leaving approximately 15 others missing.
- August 31 – September 2 – Tropical Storm Edouard forms in the northwestern Gulf of Mexico on August 31. It tracks northwestwards and makes landfall near Johnson Bayou, Louisiana, on September 1 with peak sustained winds of 60 mph (95 km/h). Moving inland over southeast Texas, it causes flash flooding and power outages before weakening into a remnant low on September 2.

=== September ===
- September 1–3 – An intense late-season heat dome expands across Southern and Central Europe, setting several early-September temperature records across Spain, Italy, and the Balkans.
- September 2 – Rare, heavy rainfall and high-altitude snowfall impact the Atacama Desert in northern Chile, triggering mudslides and disrupting mining operations.
- September 2–5 – Severe agricultural peatland and forest fires surge across Sumatra and Central Kalimantan, intensified by early dry conditions linked to the developing El Niño. Dense smoke causes toxic haze alerts, hazardous air quality levels, and school closures across parts of Riau province and neighboring Singapore.
- September 4 – Heavy monsoonal rainstorms trigger localised flooding and landslides in northern Pakistan and parts of Jammu and Kashmir, causing infrastructure damage and disrupting transit routes.
- September 4–5 – Severe nocturnal thunderstorm clusters strike northern Italy and the Upper Adriatic region, bringing severe hail, damaging straight-line winds, and localised flash flooding.
- September 5–6 – Severe early-spring gales and high waves impact southeastern Australia, triggering coastal wind warnings and minor power outages across Victoria and New South Wales.
- September 5 – Persistent drought and record-high late-summer temperatures fuel rapid wildfire growth in south-western France, prompting emergency local evacuations in the Gironde department.
- September 8–11 – An intense heatwave affects Western Europe, setting late-season high-temperature records across eastern Spain, southern France, and northern Italy, with localized maximum temperatures exceeding 38 °C (100 °F).
- September 10–13 – Torrential monsoonal rains stall over Western India, producing severe flash flooding in Gujarat and Maharashtra that inundates urban transport hubs and forces thousands of precautionary evacuations.
- September 17–18 – A localised severe storm outbreak produces an IF2-rated tornado near Bagnatica, Italy, followed by a cluster of three tornadoes in northern Germany, including an IF2 tornado in Groß Offenseth-Aspern.
- September 21–22 – Typhoon Dujuan tracks along Japan's eastern Pacific coastline. The storm brings record-breaking rainfall to the Kanto region and Izu Islands, including a September record of 600 mm (23.6 in) within 24 hours on Oshima, prompting a Level 5 landslide special warning from the Japan Meteorological Agency. The resulting flooding and landslides kill four people and six others were missing in Kanagawa, cause severe power outages, and cause major travel disruptions during the national Silver Week holidays.
- September 22 – Hurricane Polo forms off the Pacific coast of Mexico and undergoes explosive rapid intensification, adding 110 mph (180 km/h) to its wind speeds over a 24-hour span. On 22 September, Polo peaks as a Category 5 major hurricane with maximum sustained winds of 180 mph (290 km/h) and a minimum central pressure of 892 mb (26.34 inHg). This makes Polo the second-most intense hurricane on record in the Eastern Pacific basin by central pressure, second only to Hurricane Patricia in 2015.
- September 25 – A rare September nor'easter lashes the U.S. East Coast with storm-force winds and massive waves.

=== October ===
- October 1 – Heavy early-autumn monsoonal downpours trigger severe flash flooding and widespread landslips across Nepal, resulting in at least 32 fatalities and damaging major transportation infrastructure in the Kathmandu Valley.
- October 1-4 – Hurricane Nolo tracks westward across the Central Pacific Ocean, re-intensifying into a Category 3 major hurricane with maximum sustained winds of 115 mph (185 km/h). Nolo skirts low-lying Pacific atolls with heavy swells before crossing the International Date Line on 4 October, transitioning into a Western Pacific typhoon.
- October 3– An anomalous early-autumn heat wave brings record-breaking high temperatures to Southern China, where daily maximums reach 39.5 °C (103.1 °F), setting new national October temperature records across multiple stations.
- October 3 – Torrential localized rainstorms across the Castile-La Mancha region of Spain cause severe flash flooding, prompting over 90 emergency water rescues in Madrigueras.
- October 3-5 – Unseasonably strong high-pressure ridging causes an autumn heat wave across California, prompting widespread Heat Advisories and Extreme Heat Warnings from the National Weather Service as temperatures exceed seasonal averages by 10–15 °F (6–8 °C).
- October 6-9 — Hurricane Isaias forms in the Gulf of Mexico on 6 October, reaching Category 3 major hurricane status on 9 October. At 01:30 UTC on October 10, Isaias makes landfall as a Category 2 hurricane near Destin, Florida.
- October 8 – A complex global severe weather outbreak brings destructive flash flooding and mudflows across Guatemala and southern Mexico, alongside severe localized windstorms in Kisumu, Kenya, damaging infrastructure and electrical grids.
- October 10-13 – The moisture-rich remnants of Post-Tropical Cyclone Rachel, interacting with the ongoing Super El Niño, deliver widespread torrential rainfall and severe flash flooding across the Southwestern United States and Great Basin. Rainfall totals reach 1 to 4 in (25 to 102 mm) across low-lying desert areas and up to 4 to 8 in (100 to 200 mm) in mountainous regions across Southern California, Nevada, Arizona, Utah, and Idaho. Downpours inundate roads and urban areas in Las Vegas, leading to emergency water rescues in slot canyons, dry washes, and low-water crossings. Meanwhile, heavy ocean swells generated by Rachel cause coastal flooding, battering boardwalks and waterfront properties in Long Beach and along California State Route 1 in Big Sur.
- October 11-13 – An early-spring heat wave impacts eastern South Africa, with the South African Weather Service issuing warnings for dangerous heat levels across northwestern KwaZulu-Natal.
- October 14-15 – The extratropical remnants of Hurricane Isaias undergo explosive cyclogenesis over the North Atlantic, sweeping over Iceland as a powerful winter storm. A weather station at Vatnsskarðshólar records an atmospheric pressure of 937.5 hPa, breaking the national October low-pressure record set in 1963. Orange weather alerts are issued across South and West Iceland due to gale-force winds exceeding 130 km/h (81 mph) and heavy blizzard conditions that close major transportation routes.
- October 15-30 – Typhoon Champi rapidly intensifies over the Western Pacific Ocean, reaching Category 5-equivalent Super Typhoon status with 1-minute sustained winds of 260 km/h (160 mph). Champi passes just south of Guam and Rota in the Mariana Islands, dropping intense rainfall and generating wind gusts that knock out power across much of Guam before tracking toward open waters.
- October 16-21 – Storm Adam stalls across the Iberian Peninsula and the Western Mediterranean, producing catastrophic flash floods in eastern Spain with rainfall totals exceeding 700 mm (28 in) and resulting in at least five fatalities. The system subsequently tracks across Corsica—where Solenzara records a French three-hour rainfall record of 416 mm (16.4 in)—and moves into Northern Italy.
- October 20-26 – Rapidly successive Storm Austen and Storm Boelo caused severe regional travel cancellations, power grid failures, and structural damage across Northwestern Europe. Storm Austen swept through southern Britain, the Channel Islands, France, and the Benelux with wind gusts exceeding 100 mph (160 km/h), leaving nearly 300,000 French homes without electricity and injuring four people in Brussels, though no fatalities occurred. Striking immediately behind over saturated ground, Storm Boelo brought peak gusts of 85 mph (137 km/h) to Ireland, Scotland, and Northern England, cutting power to over 160,000 UK properties, causing major rail and ferry shutdowns, and resulting in two wind-related fatalities in the UK from falling trees.
- October 24-29 - Cyclone Arnab, a very severe cyclonic storm—the first named system of the 2026 North Indian Ocean cyclone season—made landfall along the Andhra Pradesh and Yanam coast in India on 28 October with peak 3-minute sustained winds of 155 km/h (100 mph). It triggered the evacuation of over 180,000 people, caused severe river and urban flooding across Andhra Pradesh and Odisha, resulted in at least 26 fatalities, and inflicted over US$550 million in damages, with emergency recovery operations extending into early November.
- October 26 - An IF3 tornado struck portions of Kepez, Antalya, Turkey, collapsing a crane and destroying two shipping containers occupied by construction workers, with one being lofted 300 metres (980 ft) onto the roof of a school. The tornado threw five workers from the containers, killing four and leaving one injured, with two workers dying at the scene and two others being declared dead later at the hospital. The fifth worker sustained only minor injuries, and no other structures were reported to have been impacted by the tornado. The tornado's rating is under discussion.

=== November ===
- November 1–7 – A severe flash flooding struck portions of Florida. The deluge brought three-day rainfall totals of 24.69 inches (627 mm) in Malabar and 24.13 inches (613 mm) in Palm Bay killing 2 and leaving hundreds rescued. Flooding also forced Election Day polling changes across several Florida counties and disrupted government services.
- Early November - A series of destructive severe thunderstorms and three confirmed tornadoes swept through Rio Grande do Sul, causing widespread structural damage and four fatalities.

== See also ==
Global weather by year
Preceded by 2025	Weather of 2026	Succeeded by 2027
