= 2026–27 European windstorm season =

2026–2027 European windstorm season
- Storm Boelo, the most intense named storm so far this season
- First storm formed: 16 October 2026
- Strongest storm^{1}: Storm Boelo 947 hPa (27.96 inHg)
- Strongest wind gust: Storm Boelo 120 mph (190 km/h)
- Total storms: 7
- Total fatalities: 13 (1)
- ^{1}Strongest storm is determined by lowest pressure and maximum recorded non-mountainous wind gust is also included for reference.

The 2026–27 European windstorm season is the current and twelfth occurrence of the continent's coordinated severe weather naming programme. While the official list of names is usually unveiled on or just before 1 September 2026, the season's duration typically spans from the start of September 2026 through to 31 August 2027, apart from the Eastern Mediterranean group, where the season begins on 1 October.

This year represents the eighth season of collaboration within the Western Group, where the Netherlands Koninklijk Nederlands Meteorologisch Instituut (KNMI) works alongside the UK's Met Office and Ireland's Met Éireann. To the south-west, the national meteorological agencies of Portugal, Spain, France, Belgium and Luxembourg have united for their tenth year of partnership.

The Mediterranean regions have also entered their sixth year of formal naming. This includes the Eastern Mediterranean group—comprising Greece, Israel, and Cyprus—and the Central Mediterranean group, which includes Italy, Slovenia, Croatia, Montenegro, North Macedonia, and Malta. Furthermore, this is the second year that the Northern Group, Norway, Sweden and Denmark, have joined the initiative.

== Background and naming ==
=== Naming conventions and criteria ===
European windstorms lack a single universal definition or naming system, with national meteorological agencies coordinating through regional EUMETNET groups instead. These regional groups name severe weather systems when forecast thresholds trigger high-level warnings to enhance public awareness.

The primary European storm-naming groups and their participating agencies operate as follows:

European regional storm naming groups and naming criteria
Region / group	Participating countries	Naming thresholds
Western Group	United Kingdom, Ireland, Netherlands	Names storms using a shared, impact-based framework whenever severe wind, rain, or snow triggers an Amber or Red weather warning in the UK, Ireland, or the Netherlands.
South-Western Group	France, Spain, Portugal, Belgium, Luxembourg, Andorra	Assigns names across all six member nations whenever an Orange or Red impact warning is issued, primarily for dangerous wind, rain, or snow.
Northern Group	Denmark, Norway, Sweden	Denmark requires an hourly average wind speed of at least 90 km/h (25 m/s), while Sweden and Norway rely on broader, impact-based extreme weather warnings.
Central Mediterranean Group	Italy, Slovenia, Croatia, Montenegro, North Macedonia, Malta, San Marino	Issued when an orange or red weather warning is triggered, primarily for high-impact wind, rain, or snow events.
Eastern Mediterranean Group	Greece, Israel, Cyprus	Greece names storms exceeding a fixed 50 km/h (~31 mph) wind threshold with infrastructure risk, while Cyprus and Israel name events based on multi-hazard Orange or Red impact warnings.

=== 2026–2027 storm names ===
==== Western group (United Kingdom, Ireland and the Netherlands) ====
Names chosen by the western group are as follows.

- Austen
- Boelo
- Chloe (unused)
- Dano (unused)
- Evelyn (unused)
- Finn (unused)
- Gwendolyn (unused)
- Heather (unused)
- Ivy (unused)
- Jade (unused)
- Kilian (unused)
- Laoise (unused)
- Miriam (unused)
- Nicola (unused)
- Olaf (unused)
- Phelim (unused)
- Ruban (unused)
- Shaun (unused)
- Theo (unused)
- Vesna (unused)
- Wende (unused)

==== South-western group (France, Spain, Portugal, Belgium, Luxembourg and Andorra) ====
Names chosen by the south-western group are as follows.

- Adam
- Bruna
- Charles
- Diane (unused)
- Eric (unused)
- Flora (unused)
- Gabriel (unused)
- Heloise (unused)
- Igor (unused)
- Julia (unused)
- Kevin (unused)
- Lola (unused)
- Michel (unused)
- Nathalie (unused)
- Oscar (unused)
- Paola (unused)
- Rafael (unused)
- Sandra (unused)
- Thomas (unused)
- Vera (unused)
- Walter (unused)

==== Northern group (Denmark, Norway and Sweden) ====
Unlike other naming groups, the Northern Group maintains a continuous, multi-season list of storm names, continuing sequential assignment from the next available entry following the usage of "Anna".

- Bjørn (unused)
- Cecilia (unused)
- Daniel (unused)
- Elena (unused)
- Filip (unused)
- Gunilla (unused)
- Hugo (unused)
- Ida (unused)
- Johan (unused)
- Karin (unused)
- Lukas (unused)
- Miriam (unused)
- Noah (unused)
- Olivia (unused)
- Pelle (unused)
- Ronja (unused)
- Sture (unused)
- Tonje (unused)
- Urban (unused)
- Vilma (unused)
- Ymer (unused)

==== Central Mediterranean group (Italy, Slovenia, Croatia, Bosnia & Herzegovina, Montenegro, North Macedonia and Malta) ====
Names chosen by the central-mediterranean group are as follows.

- Agneta
- Biagio (unused)
- Cloe (unused)
- Dante (unused)
- Eugenia (unused)
- Folco (unused)
- Gabriella (unused)
- Italo (unused)
- Lucilla (unused)
- Manlio (unused)
- Noemi (unused)
- Orazio (unused)
- Priscilla (unused)
- Rolando (unused)
- Samira (unused)
- Tarciso (unused)
- Ursula (unused)
- Virgilio (unused)
- Zeudi (unused)

==== Eastern Mediterranean group (Greece, Israel and Cyprus) ====
Names chosen by the eastern-mediterranean group are as follows

- Argos (unused)
- Bar (unused)
- Chabrias (unused)
- Dorothea (unused)
- Eitan (unused)
- Filippa (unused)
- Glafkos (unused)
- Hadar (unused)
- Ikaros (unused)
- Jason (unused)
- Kedem (unused)
- Laskarina (unused)
- Morfeas (unused)
- Nadia (unused)
- Odysseas (unused)
- Persefoni (unused)
- Roxani (unused)
- Sisyfos (unused)
- Tamar (unused)
- Uranos (unused)
- Vergina (unused)
- Wasim (unused)
- Xanthe (unused)
- Ypnos (unused)
- Zohar (unused)

==== Central/FUB naming group (Germany, Switzerland, Austria, Poland, Czech Republic, Slovakia and Hungary) ====
Like the northern group, the Free University of Berlin names storms based on low pressures across the continent and does not use a naming list. The critical criterion for FUB inclusion is that the storm must prompt a widespread orange weather warning or greater across the affected Central, NE, or SE regions of Europe.

- Talia

==== Atlantic ex-tropical cyclones ====
Ex-tropical cyclones (subtropical storms, tropical storms, or hurricanes) that directly impacted a European country from the 2026 Atlantic hurricane season or the 2027 Atlantic hurricane season which became a European windstorm and retained its name as assigned by the National Hurricane Center (NHC) in Miami, Florida.

== Season summary ==
Western group
South-western group
Northern group
Central Mediterranean group
Eastern Mediterranean group
FUB naming group

All storms named by European meteorological organisations in their respective forecasting areas, as well as Atlantic hurricanes that transitioned into European windstorms and retained the name assigned by the National Hurricane Center:

== Storms ==
=== Storm Adam (Katja) ===
Storm Adam

- Area affected: Spain, Portugal, Balearic Islands, France, Italy
- Date of impact: 16–21 October
- Maximum wind gust: 54 mph (87 km/h)
- Lowest pressure: 1,012 hPa (29.88 inHg)
- Fatalities: 5
- Power outages: Unknown

Naming and warnings

Storm Adam was named on 16 October 2026 by the Spanish State Meteorological Agency (AEMET), marking the first named storm of the 2026–2027 Southwestern Group season. The system developed off the Iberian Peninsula, bringing a cold front and widespread severe rainfall, high winds, and rough sea conditions across parts of mainland Spain, Portugal, and the Balearic Islands.

It was also known as Katja in Germany by Free University of Berlin.

Ahead of the storm, AEMET issued orange and yellow weather alerts across eastern and southern Spain and the Balearic Islands for intense, persistent precipitation and localised flash flooding.

On 17 October, AEMET escalated weather alerts to their highest level, issuing a Red Weather Alert for extreme rainfall across the southern coast of Valencia and the northern coast of Alicante. Forecasters warned that localized rainfall could exceed 200 mm (7.9 in) within 12 hours and up to 300 mm (12 in) over a 24-hour period.

Simultaneously, Orange Weather Alerts for heavy rain and thunderstorms producing 40–80 mm/h were activated across Catalonia (including Barcelona and Girona), the Balearic Islands (particularly Ibiza and Formentera), and parts of Murcia. Yellow alerts were deployed across Andalusia and Castile-La Mancha for wind gusts of 70–80 km/h (43–50 mph) and high coastal swells. Regional emergency services activated specialized flood protection plans—such as Catalonia's INUNCAT and the Balearic METEOBAL—advising residents to cancel non-essential travel and avoid dry riverbeds (*ramblas*).

As the storm tracked eastwards across the Western Mediterranean on 20 October, its associated low-pressure trough brought severe weather conditions to Northern and Central Italy. Weather advisories and flood warnings were issued for Veneto, Friuli-Venezia Giulia, and coastal areas, with forecasters warning of intense localized downpours, potential landslides, and swelling river networks. Additionally, an influx of cold air pulled in by Adam drove the snow line down below 2,000 m (6,600 ft) across the Italian Alps, bringing early-season snowfall to high-elevation areas.

Impacts

The system generated widespread flash flooding, urban inundation, and swelling of local ravines and watercourses across eastern Spain and the Balearics, with localized rainfall accumulations reaching 150–250 mm (5.9–9.8 in). Strong easterly Levante and Tramontana winds produced rough sea conditions and coastal surges along the Mediterranean shoreline, disrupting regional maritime transit and ferry links. A maximum wind gust of 54 mph (87 km/h) was reported in Oliva, Valencia. Additionally, the infusion of cold polar air brought an abrupt thermal drop of 8–10 °C (14–18 °F) across inland central and southern Spain, abruptly ending an unseasonably warm early-autumn period.

At least five fatalities were attributed to severe flooding and hazardous marine conditions across eastern Spain. In Sagunto, a 55-year-old woman drowned after being swept away by strong waves off Almardà Beach. In Catalonia, a 35-year-old woman was carried out to sea and killed after attempting to cross a swollen stream near Malgrat de Mar. Additional fatalities occurred across the Valencian Community as several rivers and ravines overflowed.

=== Storm Austen (Luise) ===
Storm Austen

- Area affected: United Kingdom, Ireland, France, Belgium, Netherlands, Denmark
- Date of impact: 20–24 October
- Maximum wind gust: 111 mph (179 km/h)
- Lowest pressure: 974 hPa (28.76 inHg)
- Fatalities: Unspecified
- Power outages: 287,000+ customers

Naming and warnings

Storm Austen was officially named on 20 October 2026 by the Met Office, marking the first named storm of the 2026–2027 Western Group windstorm season for the western group. Developing over the North Atlantic, the system was forecast to track east-northeastward toward the British Isles, bringing heavy rainfall and disruptive gale-force winds. The storm is named for English meteorologist, Austen H. Nagle (1903–1984), who served as the first director of the Irish Meteorological Service.

It was also known as Luise in Germany by Free University of Berlin.

Ahead of the storm's arrival, the Met Office issued yellow severe weather warnings for wind across South West England, South Wales, and southern coastal counties extending east to Brighton, effective from midnight to midday on 23 October. Forecasters warned of widespread gusts reaching 50 to 60 mph (80 to 97 km/h), with peak coastal gusts exceeding 70 mph (110 km/h), alongside rainfall accumulations of 20–30 mm (0.8–1.2 in).

Following the official naming of Storm Austen by the Met Office on 20 October 2026, Met Éireann issued a series of national severe weather warnings as the low-pressure system tracked toward the south of the country. Prior to the main rainband, Met Éireann issued an initial Status Yellow rain warning for Dublin and Wicklow, effective from 01:00 to 08:00 IST on 21 October, warning of localized surface flooding and hazardous morning commute conditions. As the core associated with Austen approached, a nationwide Status Yellow rain warning was declared across all 26 counties in the Republic of Ireland, scheduled from 19:00 IST on 22 October through 08:00 IST on 23 October. Forecasters warned that the storm's eastern progression across Ireland would deliver heavy rainfall capable of causing widespread travel disruption, localised surface flooding, and impacts to outdoor events.

The KNMI issued national weather advisories as the storm's eastern circulation brought widespread rainbands and gusty conditions across coastal provinces. Maritime and coastal wind warnings were declared for the North Sea coast and the Wadden Sea, with wind gusts expected to cause minor disruptions to regional ferry transit and port operations.

Météo-France issued pre-warning alerts and yellow weather advisories (vigilance jaune) for severe wind gusts and rain-flood conditions for coastal departments along the English Channel, including Pas-de-Calais, Nord, Somme, and parts of Normandy and Brittany. Offshore gale-force winds and heavy swell were forecast across the Strait of Dover, prompting maritime authorities to issue navigation warnings for shipping corridors. Météo-France issued official severe weather warnings across Northern France, placing northwestern coastal and inland departments under orange weather advisories (vigilance orange) for violent winds, heavy rain, and coastal flooding linked to the storm's arrival. Forecast models indicated sustained gale-force winds with inland gusts reaching 100–110 km/h (62–68 mph) and coastal peak gusts exceeding 130–150 km/h (80–93 mph) across exposed headlands in Normandy, Brittany, Nord-Pas-de-Calais, and Somme.

Impacts

As Storm Austen crossed the English Channel on 22–23 October, it brought severe gale-force to storm-force wind gusts and heavy rainfall to the Channel Islands and South West England. A top wind gust of 111 mph (179 km/h) was recorded at Padstow, Cornwall by the National Coastguard Institution. At Jersey Airport, peak wind gusts of 84 mph (135 km/h) were recorded as the storm's core passed overhead. Due to the impending severe weather and Red Wind Warnings issued by local meteorological services, all schools and colleges across Jersey and Guernsey were closed on 23 October as a safety precaution. In South West England, severe gales damaged overhead power infrastructure, leaving over 9,000 homes without electricity at the peak of the storm. In Brighton & Hove, peak wind gusts of 70 mph (113 km/h or 61 kt) were reached on 23 October, causing a large section of the now ruined West Pier to collapse.

In Ireland, on the night of 22–23 October with heavy rainfall and localized gale-force gusts, with peak gusts reaching 106 km/h (66 mph) at Roche's Point in County Cork. Up to 60 mm (2.4 in) of rain fell overnight in parts of Southern Ireland, causing widespread surface water accumulation and localized flooding. In County Cork and County Waterford, local authorities received reports of over 40 fallen trees and scattered debris overnight, resulting in temporary road closures along the N25 and key regional routes. Downed trees damaged streetlights and power distribution lines in Dunmore East and Colligan Woods. ESB Networks reported that approximately 3,000 homes, farms, and businesses suffered power outages across Ireland, including over 1,500 customers in Cork city and county, as well as widespread outages across Waterford city and county.

For France on 22–23 October, it brought severe gale-force to storm-force wind gusts, high seas, and heavy rain across northwestern departments, placing up to 23 departments under Orange weather advisories (vigilance orange). Power distribution network operator Enedis reported that nearly 300,000 homes lost electricity at the peak of the storm, with Brittany suffering the most extensive damage at approximately 128,000 customer outages, followed by Normandy with nearly 89,000, Pays de la Loire with around 50,000, and Hauts-de-France with roughly 8,000. Over 2,000 technicians were mobilized to restore grid connectivity. Cross-Channel maritime transit was heavily curtailed, with ferry services connecting France and England suspended throughout Friday morning due to heavy swell and dangerous gales, while Transport Minister Philippe Tabarot confirmed that regional rail line operations (TER) and major road corridors faced severe interruptions across Normandy, Brittany, Hauts-de-France, and the Île-de-France region due to fallen trees and debris. In the Finistère department, local authorities established an emergency crisis response center at the prefecture as firefighters carried out over 150 interventions overnight to clear fallen trees, repair damaged roofs, and address minor surface flooding, with damage to trees amplified by heavy late-season foliage offering high wind resistance.

In post storm analysis Met Office adjusted Austen's minimum pressure to 974 hPa (28.76 inHg).

=== Storm Boelo (Manja) ===
Storm Boelo

- Area affected: United Kingdom, Ireland, Norway
- Date of impact: 22–26 October
- Maximum wind gust: 120 mph (190 km/h)
- Lowest pressure: 947 hPa (27.96 inHg)
- Fatalities: 5
- Power outages: Unknown

Naming and warnings

Storm Boelo was officially named on 22 October 2026 by the Met Office, marking the second named storm of the 2026–2027 Western Group windstorm season.

It was also known as Manja in Germany by Free University of Berlin.

Following closely on the heels of Storm Austen, the Met Office designated Storm Boelo as a fast-developing autumn gale system capable of producing widespread disruptive weather. Forecasters warned that while Storm Austen targeted southern regions, Boelo would impact the opposite end of the UK, bringing heavy rainfall, mountain snow over higher ground in Scotland, and widespread wind gusts reaching 80–95 km/h (50–60 mph) inland, with peak gusts of 110–130 km/h (70–80 mph) across exposed coastal areas and high ground. Yellow weather warnings for wind and rain were issued ahead of the weekend to prepare populations across Scotland and Northern Ireland for potential travel disruption and localised flooding. On 23 October, as confidence in significant impacts increased, the Met Office upgraded severe weather alerts to an Amber wind warning across western and central Scotland, parts of Northern Ireland, and northern England, highlighting a potential "danger to life" from flying debris, power outages, and widespread travel disruption.

As Storm Boelo approached Ireland on 23 October, Met Éireann issued severe weather advisories and elevated national warning levels across multiple western and northern counties. A Status Orange rain warning was declared for County Kerry from 07:00 to 14:00 IST on 24 October, with forecasters warning of intense rainfall causing river and surface flooding, hazardous driving conditions, and potential damage to homes and businesses. Concurrently, Met Éireann issued **Status Orange** wind warnings for Donegal, Galway, Leitrim, Mayo, and Sligo, valid from 14:00 IST on 24 October through 09:00 IST on 25 October. The forecaster warned of gale-force westerly winds with severe, damaging gusts capable of causing structural damage, power outages, fallen trees, and coastal flooding along exposed Atlantic shores. Widespread Status Yellow wind and rain warnings were also enacted across Connacht, Clare, Cork, and Limerick. Off the coast, Met Éireann declared a Status Orange Marine Storm Warning from Erris Head to Bloody Foreland to Belfast Lough for west to northwest winds expected to reach storm force 10.

Impacts

As Storm Boelo swept across the northern United Kingdom and Ireland from 24 to 25 October 2026, it caused widespread disruptions, transport cancellations, property damage, and power distribution failures. The storm struck regions where ground conditions were already heavily saturated following Storm Austen only days earlier.

In Scotland, a top wind gust of 111.8 mph (179.9 km/h) was recorded at Loch Pityoulish in Inverness-shire, with a gust of 124 mph (200 km/h) recorded at 1,234 m (4,049 ft) on Cairngorm. The highest gust on the Met Office network was 85 mph (137 km/h) at Machrihanish. Two men also had died in a three way car crash near Bathgate. Public transport networks experienced severe preemptive and operational disruptions. Network Rail Scotland and ScotRail suspended train services across multiple key routes—including the Far North Line, West Highland Line (Oban and Mallaig branches), Kyle of Lochalsh line, and services south of Kilwinning toward Stranraer and Ayr—while implementing network-wide speed restrictions on operational lines to prevent derailment risks from fallen trees and blown debris. With peak intensity coinciding with high tide during a full moon, a significant storm surge was recorded along the west coast of Scotland, resulting in widespread damage. Much of the town centre in Largs was left underwater overnight, as waters rose to the highest level there for over 26 years; storm surge damage was also reported further along the coast in Gourock and in Skelmorlie. CalMac ferry services were heavily impacted, with dozens of sailings cancelled or delayed across the Western Isles and inner islands due to rough seas and violent coastal gusts. Road traffic faced restrictions on major structures, including speed limitations and high-sided vehicle bans on the Skye Bridge, Tay Road Bridge, and Forth Road Bridge. High winds uprooted trees across Scotland and Northern Ireland, causing power line damage, blocking roadways, and forcing the cancellation of major public events, including outdoor Halloween celebrations at Dean Castle Country Park in Kilmarnock. A 60-year-old man in Dumfries and Galloway was killed by a falling tree.

In Ireland, strong gales and intense rainfall caused localised river and surface water flooding across western counties, particularly in Kerry, Clare, and Galway. Downed trees and wind-borne debris severed overhead power lines, leaving thousands of ESB Networks customers without electricity across Connacht and Ulster, while high spring tides combined with onshore storm gales produced wave overtopping along exposed Atlantic harbours and coastal promenades.

In the Netherlands A cyclist had died and a windsurfer went missing.

In post storm analysis Met Office adjusted Boelo's minimum pressure to 947 hPa (27.96 inHg) and a top wind gust of 120 mph (190 km/h) at Cairngorms Summit.

=== Storm Agneta ===
Storm Agneta

- Area affected: Italy, The Balkans, Greece
- Date of impact: 2–3 November
- Lowest pressure: 999 hPa (29.50 inHg)

Naming and warnings

Storm Agneta was officially named on 2 November 2026 by Servizio Meteorologico as the first named storm from the Central Med Group.

Ahead of the system, severe weather alerts were activated across both Italy and Greece. In Italy, forecasts of up to 46 mm of heavy rainfall, high wind gusts reaching 65 km/h, and rough sea conditions led to rain and coastal alerts across Apulia, Puglia, and Calabria. As the low pressure system moved eastward, the Hellenic National Meteorological Service (EMY) updated its emergency weather bulletin to issue high-level alerts across Greece, declaring Red Weather Warnings for Corfu, Paxos, Epirus, the Dodecanese, and the northeastern Aegean islands (including Lemnos and Lesbos). Orange warnings were simultaneously deployed across the remaining Ionian islands, western Central Greece, the Peloponnese, Crete, and the Cyclades for localised rainfall totals exceeding 100–150 mm, while Civil Protection authorities activated the national 112 emergency notification system to issue stay-at-home directives across high-risk island zones.

Impacts

In southern Italy, Storm Agneta primarily produced short-duration intense rainfall, localised surface water pooling, and maritime transport advisories across Apulia, Taranto, and Bari on 1–2 November, though severe structural damage remained limited.

In Greece, persistent rainfall over saturated ground triggered extensive flash flooding, structural destruction, and infrastructure failure across mainland regions and several Aegean island chains. On Rhodes, following more than 17 hours of continuous precipitation, an overflowing river in Archangelos swept away at least 60 vehicles, inundated dozens of residential and commercial properties, and damaged municipal road networks, forcing the complete closure of local schools. On Kalymnos, heavy rain dislodged a large boulder from a hillside in Pothia, destroying a private garage complex, while severe street flooding, asphalt collapse, and municipal water and sewage grid failures were recorded across Samos, Volos, Lemnos, Thasos, and Kimolos. Fire brigades and civil defense teams were called to complete scores of emergency water-pumping operations across flooded settlements.

=== Storm Bruna (Pia) ===
Storm Bruna

- Area affected: Azores, Portugal (including the Madeira Archipelago) Spain
- Date of impact: 5–13 November
- Maximum wind gust: 68 mph (109 km/h)
- Lowest pressure: 969 hPa (28.61 inHg)

Naming and warnings

Storm Bruna was officially named on 5 November 2026 by IPMA. Developing as a broad, low-pressure trough over the eastern Atlantic Ocean, the system began driving an energetic cold front and tropical moisture plume toward the Iberian Peninsula and Macaronesia, initiating a prolonged multi-day period of unsettled conditions, severe gales, and high coastal swells.

It was also known as Pia in Germany by Free University of Berlin.

Ahead of the system's arrival, EUMETNET Meteoalarm, IPMA, and the State Meteorological Agency (AEMET) issued coordinated meteorological and coastal warnings across Atlantic island groups and mainland Southwestern Europe.Across Macaronesia, IPMA activated yellow rain, wind, and coastal agitation alerts across the Azores and Madeira—including higher elevations and southern coastlines—as the storm's core passed to the north. Simultaneously, AEMET and EUMETNET Meteoalarm deployed yellow advisories across the Canary Islands, focusing on La Palma and Tenerife for intense localised rainfall and strong coastal swells.On mainland Europe, IPMA issued yellow and orange weather warnings across continental Portugal for persistent heavy rainfall, localized urban flooding, strong wind gusts, and rough sea agitation expected to continue through mid-November. In Spain, AEMET and EUMETNET Meteoalarm deployed coastal and rain warnings across western Andalusia, Catalonia, and the Pyrenean regions for wind gusts exceeding 80 km/h and high sea swells along exposed shorelines.

On 9 November 2026, as Storm Bruna's primary active cold front moved inland across mainland Spain, AEMET and EUMETNET Meteoalarm escalated weather advisories to a Red Weather Warning for torrential rain, flash flooding, and extreme wind gusts up to 130 km/h (81 mph) across heavy-impact zones.

Impacts

Storm Bruna delivered heavy rainfall, severe wind gusts, and rough sea swells across Macaronesia and parts of Southwestern Europe starting on 6 November 2026.

Across Macaronesia, the initial outer rainbands of the system brought heavy localised rainfall and wind gusts up to 70 km/h (43 mph) to the western Canary Islands, particularly affecting La Palma, El Hierro, La Gomera, and Tenerife. Rain accumulations exceeded 15 mm (0.59 in) per hour across exposed southern and western slopes, while high tide coefficients combined with 3-to-5-metre (9.8 to 16.4 ft) waves triggered coastal overtopping and surface runoff. In the eastern Azores, yellow precipitation alerts led to localised urban flooding and the precautionary evacuation of a campsite on Terceira Island. Emergency services in the Canary Islands logged at least 16 storm-related incidents overnight on 7–8 November, primarily across Tenerife and La Palma. Heavy rain and severe wind sheer forced the diversion of seven commercial flights at La Palma Airport. On La Palma, gale-force winds caused minor structural damage, dislodged concrete harbour barriers, and triggered rockslides along the LP-2 highway, while wind-blown debris resulted in one confirmed injury in Fuencaliente. High winds also caused fallen trees and street debris across La Laguna, Icod de los Vinos, and Santa Cruz de Tenerife.

On continental Europe, frontal bands associated with Storm Bruna brought widespread heavy rainfall across Portugal and western Spain, with localized rainfall totals projected to reach up to 200 mm (7.9 in) through mid-November over saturated ground. Swelling coastal waves and surface runoff caused temporary travel delays, localised river rises, and hazardous sea conditions along exposed harbour walls and coastal promenades. In continental Portugal, the National Emergency and Civil Protection Authority (ANEPC) managed numerous call-outs for fallen trees, localised urban flooding, and water accumulation that forced temporary road closures, including a section of the IP3 trunk road near Santa Comba Dão. Across western Spain, localised precipitation exceeding 100 L/m² caused street flooding and drainage surcharges across municipalities in Andalusia (notably San Fernando and Seville), while red weather alerts were activated on 9 November for severe flash flooding risks and wind gusts up to 130 km/h (81 mph).

No fatal incidents were directly attributed to the storm during its initial sweep through 9 November.

In the afternoon of November 8, a 37 years old lifeguard went missing in Funchal in a period of strong waves associated with Bruna. By the end of November 10 afternoon, yhe authorities decided to stop the search operations, and since the 11th the search is integrated within the daily activities of the authorities.

=== Storm Charles ===
Storm Charles

- Area affected: Portugal (including Madeira), Morocco. Spain (including the Canary Islands), France, Italy, The Balkans
- Date of impact: 9–14 November
- Maximum wind gust: 112 mph (180 km/h)
- Lowest pressure: 987 hPa (29.15 inHg)
- Fatalities: 3

Meteorological history

Storm Charles originated in early November 2026 from a non-tropical Atlantic low south of Bermuda, which the National Hurricane Center briefly monitored as Invest 94L (AL94) for potential subtropical development. Tracking east-northeastward beneath the subtropical jet stream, the system retained hybrid features—including strong core convection and a warm core—before interacting with an upper-level trough as it approached Macaronesia and the Iberian Peninsula, where numerical models forecast rapid deepening to near 980 hPa (28.94 inHg).

Naming and warnings

Storm Charles was officially named on 9 November 2026 by IPMA. It followed closely behind Storm Bruna, which had been affecting Spain since 7 November. AEMET described Charles as a small but deep low-pressure system expected to cross Spain quickly, bringing very heavy rain and strong winds, although there was uncertainty over its exact track and the areas it would affect. The system was forecast to draw warm, humid air from tropical latitudes. Red warnings, the highest level, were issued in Portugal (on the mainland and in Madeira) and in Spain.

In Portugal, IPMA issued orange warnings for rain, wind and rough seas in several mainland districts, including Lisbon, Évora, Faro, Setúbal, Santarém, Leiria, Beja and Castelo Branco, with gusts of up to 120 km/h (75 mph) and waves of up to 6 m (20 ft) forecast. By the afternoon of 10 November, red warnings were in place for wind in eight mainland districts and for rain in six, with the coast from Leiria through Lisbon to Setúbal considered among the most exposed. The red wind warnings for 11 November ran from 09:00 to 21:00 in Beja, Faro and Setúbal, and from 12:00 to 21:00 in Évora, Leiria, Lisbon, Portalegre and Santarém, while the red rain warnings ran from 12:00 to 18:00 in Castelo Branco, Leiria, Lisbon, Portalegre, Santarém and Setúbal. IPMA expected the storm to make landfall between Cabo Carvoeiro and Sines. In Madeira, a red warning was in force for the mountains and the south coast from 21:00 on 10 November to 06:00 on 11 November, with gusts of up to 130 km/h (81 mph) forecast on high ground, while the north coast was under an orange warning. A separate red wind warning applied to the island's mountains from 00:00 to 06:00 on 11 November, with gusts of up to 140 km/h (87 mph) forecast. The Portuguese government declared a state of alert for all of mainland Portugal from 00:00 to 23:59 on 11 November, and the national civil protection authority (ANEPC) raised its readiness to the highest level; schools and non-essential public services on the mainland were closed for the day.

In Spain, a red warning for rainfall was put in place for 10 November, from 09:00 to 23:59 local time, in the north of the province of Cáceres (Extremadura) and the south of the province of Ávila (Castile and León), where accumulations of up to 120 mm (4.7 in) in 12 hours were forecast. Spanish media linked the red warning chiefly to the fronts associated with Bruna ahead of Charles' arrival. In response, the regional government of Castile and León suspended school activity and imposed maximum mobility restrictions in 32 municipalities in the south of Ávila, home to around 49,000 people. On the evening of 9 November, AEMET also issued special warning 38/2026 covering 10–12 November for the south and west of the Iberian Peninsula and the Canary Islands, citing the combined effects of Bruna and Charles. Charles was expected to enter the peninsula, probably through Portugal, on 11 November, worsening the wind and rainfall, before weakening progressively from 12 November as it moved northeast.

The Government of the Canary Islands declared a wind alert across the whole archipelago from 18:00 local time on 10 November. AEMET forecast orange warnings for wind gusts on all eight islands on 11 November, with gusts that could locally exceed 130 km/h (81 mph) on La Palma and Tenerife, and the heaviest rain on La Palma. The emergency services' bulletin, based on AEMET information, classed Charles as a high-impact storm.

Impacts

Storm Charles produced extensive infrastructure damage, transport collapse, and municipal disruptions across Macaronesia, Portugal, and Southwestern Spain on 10–11 November 2026, worsening ground saturation left by Storm Bruna.

Across Macaronesia, the system battered the Madeira archipelago on 10 November with localised torrents, single-day rain accumulations exceeding 200 mm (7.9 in), and peak wind gusts reaching up to 130 km/h (81 mph). Heavy runoff flooded ravines and urban streets, downed trees, and forced the cancellation of 16 flights at Madeira Airport. Emergency personnel in Madeira performed a water rescue to extract a man swept away when floodwaters inundated his residential garage.

In continental Portugal, the national government placed emergency services on high standby, closing all public schools, universities, and non-essential municipal operations on 11 November while advising residents to stay indoors. The storm severely disrupted air and sea transport, leading to the cancellation of over 200 commercial flights—including 184 flights at Lisbon Airport alone—and forcing 18 harbor entrances to close to maritime navigation. The National Emergency and Civil Protection Authority (ANEPC) logged at least 538 emergency incidents across mainland Portugal, concentrated in Greater Lisbon, the Setúbal Peninsula, Alentejo, and the Algarve. Heavy downpours inundated lower-lying areas, submerging vehicles near Lisbon's Oriente station and keeping key urban road tunnels closed. The Portuguese Environment Agency identified 101 municipalities as being at elevated risk of severe urban flooding.

In Spain, the State Meteorological Agency (AEMET) warned of severe impacts across southwestern regions as heavy frontal precipitation moved inland on 11 November. In central Spain, authorities maintained the emergency evacuation of over 3,000 residents from Piedralaves, Ávila, who had been evacuated due to structural overflow risks at the local dam following heavy rain from Storms Bruna and Charles.

Shortly after 18:00 local time, part of the perimeter wall surrounding a school in Casablanca's Salmia neighbourhood collapsed during severe winds and heavy rain, killing one person and seriously injuring another.

In the Isle of Corsica south of Francetwo men have been confirmed to be swept away from the strong winds across the shores.

=== Storm Talia ===
Storm Talia

- Area affected: United Kingdom, Netherlands France, Ireland, Germany, Switzerland, Poland, Ukraine, Czech Republic, Slovakia, Romania
- Date of impact: 14-21 November
- Maximum wind gust: 84 mph (135 km/h)
- Lowest pressure: 953 hPa (28.14 inHg)

Naming and warnings

Storm Talia was officially named on 14 November 2026 by Free University of Berlin. It was a severe mid-latitude windstorm and rain system in mid-November 2026 that impacted Germany and much of Western Europe and Central Europe following its transatlantic evolution. Affecting a broad swath of countries—including the British Isles, France, Belgium, the Netherlands, Switzerland, Germany, and Poland—the system generated damaging wind gusts, heavy precipitation, and transport disruptions.

In Germany, the German Weather Service (DWD) issued red flood and storm warnings ahead of the associated low-pressure systems, particularly across Bavaria, Saxony-Anhalt, Thuringia, and the Harz, while highlighting risks of flooding and landslides in Rhineland-Palatinate.

Warnings were issued across Central Europe, the United Kingdom, France, and Germany during the event with yellow snow warnings for central northern England. In Central Europe, orange-level alerts were reported across Switzerland, the Czech Republic, and Slovakia, while Romania's ANM issued severe weather alerts—including yellow and orange codes—for heavy rain, strong winds, and mountain snow as the system progressed eastward.

In the British Isles, wind and wintry hazards accompanied the transition into a European windstorm with gusts reaching 78 mph (126 km/h) in Wales and snow falling in parts of Northern England and Southern Scotland. In France, Météo-France issued an orange flood alert for Pas-de-Calais amid heavy rain reaching up to 70 mm (2.76 in) between the Somme and Pas-de-Calais, alongside rain and wave warnings across southern and Mediterranean departments. In Germany, the German Weather Service (DWD) issued flood and storm warnings for Bavaria, Saxony-Anhalt, Thuringia, and the Harz, while also flagging potential flooding and landslides in Rhineland-Palatinate alongside red and orange alerts in parts of the country.

Impacts

Across Western Europe more broadly, the storm brought gusts reaching up to 78 mph (126 km/h) in Wales, light snow in parts of northern England and southern Scotland, heavy rain and flood alerts in northwestern France, and heightened wind and travel hazards across neighbouring central European regions.

Between 17–20 November, Storm Talia, its offshoots, and influence from Storm Uma, heavily impacted Germany, serious damage from strong wind gusts reaching 53 mph (85 km/h) uprooted a tree that fell onto a former school that destroyed it in Neunkirchen, Saarland. Flooding occurred in Solingen, where floodwaters reached knee-height in Hildener Straße. A motorist was injured along the B 294 in Birkenfeld when a tree fell onto the vehicle. Two more motorists were injured near Groß-Umstadt when strong wind gusts skidded their vehicle off the road into a tree, causing €30,000 ($33,000 USD) in damages. The German Weather Service (DWD) issued flood and storm warnings in Bavaria, Saxony-Anhalt, Thuringia, and the Harz in advance of the low pressure systems. The DWD also noted the possibility of landslides and flooding in Rhineland-Palatinate.

== Season effects ==
=== Summary ===
The following table lists all the windstorms that have been named by at least one of the European meteorological naming groups, as well as those with names assigned by the Free University of Berlin (FUB). The table includes the storm's duration, peak intensity, and its socio-economic impact across affected countries.

Name	Dates active	Named by	Highest wind gust	Lowest pressure	Storm Type	FUB name	Countries affected	Fatalities (+missing)
Adam	16–21 Oct	(Spain) AEMET	54 mph (87 km/h) Oliva, Spain	1,012 hPa (29.88 inHg)	DANA (Cut-off low)	Katja	Spain, Portugal, Balearic Islands, France, Italy	5
Austen	20–23 Oct	(United Kingdom) Met Office	111 mph (179 km/h) Padstow, United Kingdom	974 hPa (28.8 inHg)	Extra-tropical cyclone	Luise	United Kingdom, Ireland, France, Belgium, Netherlands, Denmark	0
Boelo	22–26 Oct	(United Kingdom) Met Office	120 mph (190 km/h) Cairngorms Summit, United Kingdom	947 hPa (27.96 inHg)	Extra-tropical cyclone	Manja	United Kingdom, Ireland, Norway	5
Agneta	2–3 Nov	(Italy) Servizio Meteorologico	N/A	999 hPa (29.50 inHg)	Extra-tropical cyclone	N/A	Italy, Greece, Balkans	0
Bruna	5–13 Nov	(Portugal) IPMA	68 mph (109 km/h) Roque de los Muchachos, Spain	969 hPa (28.61 inHg)	Extra-tropical cyclone	Pia	Azores, Portugal (including the Madeira Archipelago), Spain	0 (+1)
Charles	9–14 Nov	(Portugal) IPMA	112 mph (180 km/h) Sierra Nevada, Spain	987 hPa (29.15 inHg)	Extra-tropical cyclone	N/A	Portugal, Morocco, Spain (including the Canary Islands), France, Italy, Balkans	1
Talia	14–21 Nov	(Germany) FUB	N/A	961 hPa (28.38 inHg)	Extra-tropical cyclone	FUB Assigned	United Kingdom, France, Germany, Switzerland, Belgium, Netherlands, Czech Republic, Slovakia, Poland, Romania, Ukraine	0

== See also ==
- Weather of: 2026, 2027
- Tropical cyclones in: 2026, 2027
- 2026-27 North American winter
- 2026-27 Asian winter
- List of historical European windstorm names
