= 2026–27 North American winter =

Seasonal boundaries
- Meteorological winter: December 1 – February 28
- Astronomical winter: December 21 – March 20
- First event started: September 23, 2026

Seasonal statistics
- Total WPC-issued storms: 3 total
- Rated storms (RSI) (Cat. 1+): None
- Major storms (RSI) (Cat. 3+): None
- Maximum snowfall accumulation: 19 in (48 cm) in Checkerboard, Montana (October 10–12, 2026)
- Total fatalities: 1 total
- Total damage: $750 million (2026 USD)

Related articles
- 2026–27 European windstorm season

The 2026–27 North American winter is the winter that will occur during late 2026 to early 2027 in North America. The winter season began early with a rare September nor'easter that affected the United States East Coast. The 2026 to 2027 "Super" El Niño event is forecast to influence weather patterns across the North American continent during the season.

While there is no well-agreed-upon date used to indicate the start of winter in the Northern Hemisphere, there are two definitions of winter which may be used. Based on the astronomical definition, winter begins at the winter solstice, which in 2026 will occur on December 21, and ends at the March equinox, which in 2027 will occur on March 20. Based on the meteorological definition, the first day of winter is December 1 and the last day February 28. Both definitions involve a period of approximately three months, with some variability. Winter is often defined by meteorologists to be the three calendar months with the lowest average temperatures. Since both definitions span the calendar year, it is possible to have a winter storm spanning two different years.

== Seasonal forecasts ==
Temperature outlook in the United States

Precipitation outlook in the United States

On October 15, 2026, the National Oceanic and Atmospheric Administration's Climate Prediction Center released its U.S. Winter Outlook. The temperature and precipitation outlooks reflected how the ongoing "super" El Niño event would influence the weather patterns across the continent during the winter. Above-average temperatures were expected across most of the Northern United States and East Coast. Near-average temperatures were expected to occur in the Southeast, with equal chances within the Southwest. Precipitation amounts were expected to be above average and wetter across much of the southern U.S. and East Coast due to an active subtropical jet, while below-average amounts and drier conditions expected in the northern tier near the Great Lakes.

== Seasonal summary ==
The 2026–27 winter season began with an early-season nor'easter in late September, which impacted the Northeastern United States. In mid-October, tropical moisture from the remnants of Hurricane Rachel helped produce snowfall in Montana. Another nor'easter then began to develop soon after. The nor'easter would later develop into Subtropical Storm Josephine.

== Events ==
=== Late September nor'easter ===
- Category 0 "Nuisance" (RSI/NOAA: N/A)
- Duration: September 23 – September 29, 2026
- Lowest pressure: 986 mb (29.12 inHg)
- Fatalities: 1 fatalities
- Damage: $750 million (2026 USD)

An unusually strong and rare nor'easter caused widespread impacts across the Northeastern United States in late September 2026. Although nor'easters typically strike in the late fall and winter, forecasters described this system as a rare, high-intensity early-season storm, drawing comparisons to Hurricane Sandy, Hurricane Irene, Hurricane Bob and Hurricane Gloria because of the scale of expected coastal flooding. Originating from an upper-level low as a frontal low-pressure system on September 23, the system meandered erratically off the U.S. East Coast gradually undergoing cyclogenesis as it approached the U.S. Northeast.

As of September 28, more than 200,000 people total have lost power across the Northeast, one person died in Brooklyn from a fallen tree, and nearly 550 flights have been cancelled. Gallagher Re estimated monetary losses to have reached $750 million dollars (2026 USD).

Meteorologists emphasized how unusual the storm's timing was, noting that nor'easters are far more common in the late fall and winter than in September. According to the Boston Globe, only about 1 percent of nor'easters on record have developed in September, a pattern typically associated with a surface front stalling off the mid-Atlantic coast beneath a dipping jet stream. NBC10 Boston similarly noted that while nor'easters can form at any time of year, they are most frequent in winter, making a storm of this strength forming in September especially rare, according to the National Weather Service.

=== Post-Tropical Cyclone Rachel ===
- Category 0 "Nuisance" (RSI/NOAA: N/A)
- Duration: October 10 – October 12, 2026
- Lowest pressure: 996 mb (29.41 inHg)
- Maximum snow: 19 in (48 cm)
- Fatalities: 0 (winter-related) fatalities

The remnants of Hurricane Rachel from the Eastern Pacific moved into the Intermountain West on October 11, producing heavy rain across Utah and prompting flood watches. Additionally, tropical moisture from Rachel interacted with another low-pressure system and produced heavy snowfall in Montana, with parts of the state recording over 1 ft (0.30 m) of snow. Up to 19 in (48 cm) reported in Checkerboard.

Flooding forced a closure on Utah State Route 190 due to debris falling on the road. The destruction, including flash flooding and fallen trees, forced the first cancellation of the ongoing 2026 Moab 240 ultramarathon, in Moab, Utah. Snow was also observed in some mountains across the state. Over 9,500 customers across Utah lost power.

=== Mid November nor'easter ===
- Category 0 "Nuisance" (RSI/NOAA: N/A)
- Duration: November 13 – November 20, 2026
- Lowest pressure: 953 mb (28.14 inHg)
- Maximum snow: 13.2 in (34 cm)
- Fatalities: 0 fatalities

The November 2026 nor'easter, also referred to as Storm Talia in Europe, was a powerful storm complex that affected regions from the Eastern United States to Western Europe. From November 12–14, the complex nor'easter brought the first large accumulations of snowfall across the Northeast, as well as bringing severe weather across the Mid-Atlantic. After the system became a European windstorm over the north Atlantic, it was named Talia by the Free University of Berlin, impacting Western Europe, and bringing the first accumulations of snow across the British Isles.

== Season effects ==
This is a table of all of the events that have occurred in the 2026–27 North American winter. It includes their duration, damage, impacted locations, and death totals. Deaths in parentheses are additional and indirect (an example of an indirect death would be a traffic accident), but were still related to that storm. All of the damage figures are in 2026 USD.

Regional snowfall index scale
C0	C1	C2	C3	C4	C5

2026–27 North American winter season statistics
Event name	Dates active	RSI category	RSI value	Highest gust mph (km/h)	Minimum pressure (mbar)	Maximum snow in (cm)	Maximum ice in (mm)	Areas affected	Damage (2026 USD)	Deaths
Late September nor'easter	September 23–29	N/A	N/A	81 (130)	986	N/A	N/A	United States East Coast	$750 million	1
Post-Tropical Cyclone Rachel	October 10–12	N/A	N/A	63 (101)	996	19 (48)	N/A	Western United States	Unknown	0
Mid November nor'easter	November 13–November 20	N/A	N/A	55–59 (89–95)	953	13.2 (34)	N/A	Northeastern United States, Mid-Atlantic states	Unknown	0
Season aggregates
0 RSI storms	September 23 – TBD				986	19 (48)	0		≥ $0	1

== See also ==
- Tornadoes of 2026
- Weather of 2026

Preceded by 2025–26	North American winters 2026–27	Succeeded by 2027–28
