= November 2026 nor'easter =

2026 storm in the northeastern United States

- The nor'easter off the Jersey Shore on November 13

Meteorological history
- Formed: November 10, 2026
- Exited land: November 15, 2026
- Dissipated: November 20, 2026

Category 0 "Nuisance" winter storm
- Regional snowfall index: 0.00 (NOAA)
- Highest winds: 70 mph (110 km/h) (1-minute sustained winds)
- Highest gusts: 78 mph (126 km/h) in Wales
- Lowest pressure: 953 mbar (hPa); 28.14 inHg
- Max. snowfall: 13.2 in (34 cm) of snow in Leonardsville, New York

Tornado outbreak
- Tornadoes: 2
- Max. rating: EF1 tornado

Overall effects
- Fatalities: 0
- Injuries: 3
- Damage: >$33,000 (2026 USD)
- Areas affected: Ohio Valley, Mid-Atlantic states, Northeastern United States, Atlantic Canada, British Isles, France, Germany
- Power outages: ~11,000
- Part of the 2026–27 North American winter and the 2026–27 European windstorm season

The November 2026 nor'easter, also referred to as Storm Talia in Europe, was a powerful storm complex that affected regions from the Eastern United States to Western Europe. From November 12–14, the complex nor'easter brought the first large accumulations of snowfall across the Northeast, as well as bringing severe weather across the Mid-Atlantic. After the system became a European windstorm over the north Atlantic, it was named Talia by the Free University of Berlin, impacting Western Europe, and bringing the first accumulations of snow across the British Isles.

== Meteorological history ==
Map plotting the storm's track and intensity, according to the Saffir–Simpson scale Map key Saffir–Simpson scale Tropical depression (≤38 mph, ≤62 km/h) Tropical storm (39–73 mph, 63–118 km/h) Category 1 (74–95 mph, 119–153 km/h) Category 2 (96–110 mph, 154–177 km/h) Category 3 (111–129 mph, 178–208 km/h) Category 4 (130–156 mph, 209–251 km/h) Category 5 (≥157 mph, ≥252 km/h) Unknown Storm type Tropical cyclone Subtropical cyclone Extratropical cyclone, remnant low, tropical disturbance, or monsoon depression

On November 10, 2026, a low-pressure system developed over the Northern Plains, and proceeded to move eastward. Early on November 12, 2026, the Weather Prediction Center (WPC) noted the low moving off the U.S. Mid-Atlantic coast under an amplified mid-level trough; providing cooling aloft and sufficient instability for robust updraft development, as the low moved off the Jersey coast that day. A secondary low was noted strengthening off the Jersey coast at the same time as a result of increased offshore baroclinicity. By the next morning, the secondary low had deepened just behind the first low, which; in-tandem produced rainfall and snowfall across the U.S. Northeast, reaching minimum central pressures of 992 mbar (29.3 inHg) and 990 mbar (29.2 inHg) respectively during their closest approach to the East Coast. The secondary low located just south of Long Island, continued moving to the east that day.

Storm Talia I (left) & Talia II (right) at their lifetime peak intensity on November 17

By November 15, the system had begun opening up as it moved near the Canadian Maritimes, the amplified mid-level trough remained established over the Northeast, maintaining persistent northwest cyclonic flow and cold air advection; paired with a sudden stratospheric warming (SSW) event, continued bringing scattered showers, colder temperatures, and lake-effect snow across the Ohio Valley and Northeast. The Free University of Berlin (FUB) named the systems Talia I and Talia II as both lows began undergoing cyclogenesis over the far North Atlantic as they accelerated towards the northeast on November 15, merging three days later. On November 17, the associated fronts of Talia reached the British Isles, bringing unsettled conditions across the region for the next few days. The low began moving to the southeast, away from England, as a high-pressure area built up over the British Isles on November 20. Two new areas of low pressure formed along Talia's fronts during that time, named Talia II (Note: This separate low pressure area is distinct from the Talia II that merged with Talia I over the far North Atlantic on November 18.) and Talia III. Late on November 20, Talia dissipated over Germany, while the new cyclones continued eastward.

== Impact ==
=== United States ===
Storm reports for November 12, 2026

==== New York & New Jersey ====
Severe thunderstorms across the region produced heavy rainfall and tornadoes. Bridgeport, New Jersey reported large accumulations of hail. JFK International Airport recorded 3.56 inches (90 mm) of rainfall on November 12, breaking the previous daily rainfall record set in 1975, and becoming the second wettest November day on record. Radar-indicated rotation was located south of Rockaway Beach moving to the northeast at 15 miles per hour (24 km/h), prompting the National Weather Service (NWS) New York office to issue a rare tornado warning for southern Queens. Ground stops were issued in JFK and LaGuardia airports. Flash flooding and heavy rainfall forced parts of the JFK Expressway and Interstate 678 to close; one vehicle was reportedly stuck in floodwaters.

Two tornado warnings were issued for portions of Burlington County, southeastern Mercer County and southwestern Monmouth County in the late afternoon, the NWS in Mount Holly noted "a rotating wall-cloud was observed near Westampton Township in Burlington County." Followed by reports of a tornado seen on the ground in Chesterfield Township. Storm surveyers the next day later confirmed an EF1 tornado that had winds of 100 mph (160 km/h) caused substantial damage to a farm building, strong winds damaged houses, trees, fences, and utility poles as it remained on the ground for 1.5 miles (2.4 km) in Chesterfield, no injuries or fatalities were reported from the tornado.

Upstate New York recorded its first measurable snowfall of the season, though initially projected to peak at 6 inches (15 cm) in higher elevations, snowfall amounts reached 10 inches (25 cm) in Cherry Valley, Otsego County. Other communities such as Springfield and Richfield Springs recorded 7 inches (18 cm). The maximum reported snowfall was 13.2 inches (33.5 cm) in Leonardsville, the wet snow led to nearly 11,000 people losing power across Upstate New York.

==== Delaware ====
A tornado warning was issued for parts of New Castle County, Delaware, including Wilmington, Newark, Stanton and Newport. A funnel cloud was reported near Wilmington and was later confirmed to be a tornado, damage was reported near Christiana Hospital. A few days later, NWS surveyors confirmed than an EF1 tornado with winds of 100 mph (160 km/h) struck New Castle County; forming in Salem Woods neighborhood, remaining on the ground for 10 minutes and trekking 4.4 miles before dissipating in Stanton, the tornado uprooted multiple trees and caused minor damage to multiple houses; at its peak intensity, the tornado caused significant roof and siding damage, trees were snapped at their trunks. This event is only the second confirmed tornado in the state of Delaware in the month of November.

==== Pennsylvania ====
In Delaware County, severe thunderstorms brought heavy hail accumulation of around 19 inches (48 cm) to Parkside Borough. Route 352 was closed due to several drivers becoming stuck. Flooding impacted portions of Interstate 76 and Interstate 95 around Philadelphia and water rescues were reported in Chester Township and Aston.

==== New England ====
As the nor'easter passed through New England on November 13, it brought cold weather and wind chills across Boston. Wind gusts in Block Island reached 55 to 59 miles per hour (89 to 95 km/h). The highest rainfall in Connecticut by that morning was in Stamford with 1.03 in (26 mm) of rain. Snow was also reported across Massachusetts, Vermont and New Hampshire, with 3 in (7.6 cm) of snow in eastern Hawley, Massachusetts. The nor'easter mostly missed the state of Maine, however precipitation was recorded in York.

==== Ohio Valley ====
As the nor'easter drifted off the East Coast, persistent northwestern flow associated with amplified mid-level troughing brought lake-effect showers and gusts reaching 10–20 mph (15–30 km/h) and occasionally 30 mph (50 km/h) in Northeast Ohio. However, snowfall totals in Ohio were minimal.

=== Atlantic Canada ===
==== Newfoundland & Labrador ====
As the tapering nor'easter passed through the Maritimes, temperatures reached near below freezing across Newfoundland, light rainfall around half an inch (13 mm) occurred across much of the province. In Labrador, light snow was observed in Lab West and Churchill Falls totaling between 0.5–2 in (2–5 cm) with up to 4 inches (100 mm) in higher elevations.

=== Europe ===
Storm Talia over Northern France on November 20

==== British Isles ====
After transitioning into a European windstorm, the system produced snow totaling 0.4–1.2 in (1–3 cm) across the majority of locations in Northern England and Southern Scotland. Wind gusts in Wales reached 78 mph (126 km/h).

==== France ====
As it impacted the British Isles, the southern end of Talia impacted Northwestern France, rainfall occurred in Manche, rain accumulations reached 2.76 in (70 mm) in places between the Somme and Pas-de-Calais, an orange flood alert was issued by Météo-France for the latter department.

==== Germany ====
Between November 17–20, Storm Talia, its offshoots, and influence from Storm Uma, heavily impacted Germany, producing serious damage. Strong wind gusts reaching 53 mph (85 km/h) uprooted a tree that fell onto a former school in Neunkirchen, Saarland, destroying it. Flooding occurred in Solingen, where floodwaters reached knee-height in Hildener Straße. A motorist was injured along the B 294 in Birkenfeld when a tree fell onto the vehicle. Two more motorists were injured near Groß-Umstadt when strong wind gusts skidded their vehicle off the road into a tree, causing €30,000 ($33,000 USD) in damages. The German Weather Service (DWD) issued flood and storm warnings in Bavaria, Saxony-Anhalt, Thuringia, and the Harz in advance of the low pressure systems. The DWD also noted the possibility of landslides and flooding in Rhineland-Palatinate.

== See also ==
- Nor'easter
- European windstorm
- October 2021 nor'easter
- September 2026 nor'easter
- January 30 – February 2, 2026 nor'easter
