= 2026 Storm Adam floods =

Deadly flooding

Storm Adam

- Area affected: Spain, Portugal, Balearic Islands, France, Italy
- Date of impact: 16–21 October
- Maximum wind gust: 54 mph (87 km/h)
- Lowest pressure: 1,012 hPa (29.88 inHg)
- Fatalities: 5
- Power outages: Unknown

Naming and warnings

Storm Adam was named on 16 October 2026 by the Spanish State Meteorological Agency (AEMET), marking the first named storm of the 2026–2027 Southwestern Group season. The system developed off the Iberian Peninsula, bringing a cold front and widespread severe rainfall, high winds, and rough sea conditions across parts of mainland Spain, Portugal, and the Balearic Islands.

It was also known as Katja in Germany by Free University of Berlin.

Ahead of the storm, AEMET issued orange and yellow weather alerts across eastern and southern Spain and the Balearic Islands for intense, persistent precipitation and localised flash flooding.

On 17 October, AEMET escalated weather alerts to their highest level, issuing a Red Weather Alert for extreme rainfall across the southern coast of Valencia and the northern coast of Alicante. Forecasters warned that localized rainfall could exceed 200 mm (7.9 in) within 12 hours and up to 300 mm (12 in) over a 24-hour period.

Simultaneously, Orange Weather Alerts for heavy rain and thunderstorms producing 40–80 mm/h were activated across Catalonia (including Barcelona and Girona), the Balearic Islands (particularly Ibiza and Formentera), and parts of Murcia. Yellow alerts were deployed across Andalusia and Castile-La Mancha for wind gusts of 70–80 km/h (43–50 mph) and high coastal swells. Regional emergency services activated specialized flood protection plans—such as Catalonia's INUNCAT and the Balearic METEOBAL—advising residents to cancel non-essential travel and avoid dry riverbeds (*ramblas*).

As the storm tracked eastwards across the Western Mediterranean on 20 October, its associated low-pressure trough brought severe weather conditions to Northern and Central Italy. Weather advisories and flood warnings were issued for Veneto, Friuli-Venezia Giulia, and coastal areas, with forecasters warning of intense localized downpours, potential landslides, and swelling river networks. Additionally, an influx of cold air pulled in by Adam drove the snow line down below 2,000 m (6,600 ft) across the Italian Alps, bringing early-season snowfall to high-elevation areas.

Impacts

The system generated widespread flash flooding, urban inundation, and swelling of local ravines and watercourses across eastern Spain and the Balearics, with localized rainfall accumulations reaching 150–250 mm (5.9–9.8 in). Strong easterly Levante and Tramontana winds produced rough sea conditions and coastal surges along the Mediterranean shoreline, disrupting regional maritime transit and ferry links. A maximum wind gust of 54 mph (87 km/h) was reported in Oliva, Valencia. Additionally, the infusion of cold polar air brought an abrupt thermal drop of 8–10 °C (14–18 °F) across inland central and southern Spain, abruptly ending an unseasonably warm early-autumn period.

At least five fatalities were attributed to severe flooding and hazardous marine conditions across eastern Spain. In Sagunto, a 55-year-old woman drowned after being swept away by strong waves off Almardà Beach. In Catalonia, a 35-year-old woman was carried out to sea and killed after attempting to cross a swollen stream near Malgrat de Mar. Additional fatalities occurred across the Valencian Community as several rivers and ravines overflowed.
