= Piedralaves =

- municipality
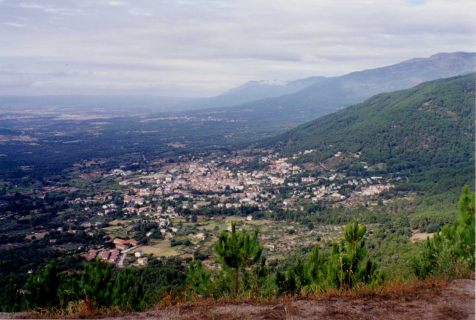
- Panoramic view of Piedralaves

- Flag Coat of arms

- Location in Spain. Piedralaves (Spain)
- Coordinates: 40°19′02″N 4°41′53″W
- Country: Spain
- Autonomous community: Castile and León
- Province: Ávila

Area
  - Total: 55 km^{2} (21 sq mi)

Population (2025-01-01)
  - Total: 2,183
  - Density: 40/km^{2} (100/sq mi)
- Time zone: UTC+1 (CET)
  - Summer (DST): UTC+2 (CEST)
- Website: Official website

Piedralaves is a municipality located in the province of Ávila, Castile and León, Spain.

== Population ==
Historical population
Year	Pop.	±% p.a.
2023	2,136	—
2024	2,150	+0.66%
2025	2,183	+1.53%
Source: INE
