= Chorrillos =

Chorrillos may refer to

== Places ==
- Chorrillos River, Argentina
- Chorrillos, Tarija Department, Bolivia
- Chorrillos, Chile
  - Antofagasta
  - Valparaíso
- Chorrillos District, Lima, Peru
- Chorrillos, Peru, a southern suburb of Lima

== Other ==
- Association Chorrillos football club in Chorrillos, Lima
- Battle of Chorrillos in the War of the Pacific, around Chorrillos, Lima
- Chorrillos Military School in Chorrillos, Lima
- Sport Chorrillos football club in Piura, Peru
