= Hydrometeorological Institute of Montenegro =

- Hidrometeorološki zavod Crne Gore; HMZCG

Agency overview
- Formed: 20 December 1947
- Headquarters: Podgorica, Montenegro
- Website: www.meteo.co.me

Hydrometeorological Institute of Montenegro (Montenegrin: Hidrometeorološki zavod Crne Gore or HMZCG) is the national hydrological and meteorological service of Montenegro.

== History ==
The first systematic measuring in free Montenegro was conducted on 1 September 1882 in Podgorica and was organized by Dr. Petar Miljanić. The measuring included basic climate elements, atmospheric temperature, precipitation, humidity, atmospheric pressure and wind direction. At the same time, during 1882, meteorological measuring started in towns of Bar and Ulcinj for the maritime purposes. As of 1887, the measuring also started in the towns of Cetinje and Nikšić, and later on in other urban parts of the Principality of Montenegro. A central meteorological service in Montenegro was established in 1931 and was operational until 1941.

Upon adoption of a Decree on Establishment of Hydrometeorological service in Montenegro, the Hydrometeorological Institute started with operations on 20 December 1947 as a governmental agency. Precipitation, maritime, meteorological, climatological, synoptical, agrometeorological and hydrological stations that were controlled by the army fell under the competence of the Hydrometeorological Institute.

Today, the Hydrometeorological Institute of Montenegro (HMZCG) has been organized in four sectors with 114 full-time employees. In the network of stations including 120 meteorological stations, 40 hydrological stations, 36 water quality stations and 17 air quality stations, there are 49 full-time employees, with over 100 part-time observers being engaged in observing, measuring and collecting of meteorological, hydrological and ecological parameters. 65 employees work in expert units of the Institute in Podgorica.
