= Copernicus Climate Change Service =

European Union scientific programme

- Abbreviation: C3S
- Formation: 2014
- Founder: European Commission
- Type: Climate monitoring service
- Purpose: Provide climate information for climate change adaptation and mitigation
- Fields: Climate science
- Website: https://climate.copernicus.eu

The Copernicus Climate Change Service (abbreviated as C3S) is one of the six thematic services provided by the European Union's Copernicus Programme. The Copernicus Programme is managed by the European Commission and the C3S is implemented by the European Centre for Medium-Range Weather Forecasts (ECMWF).

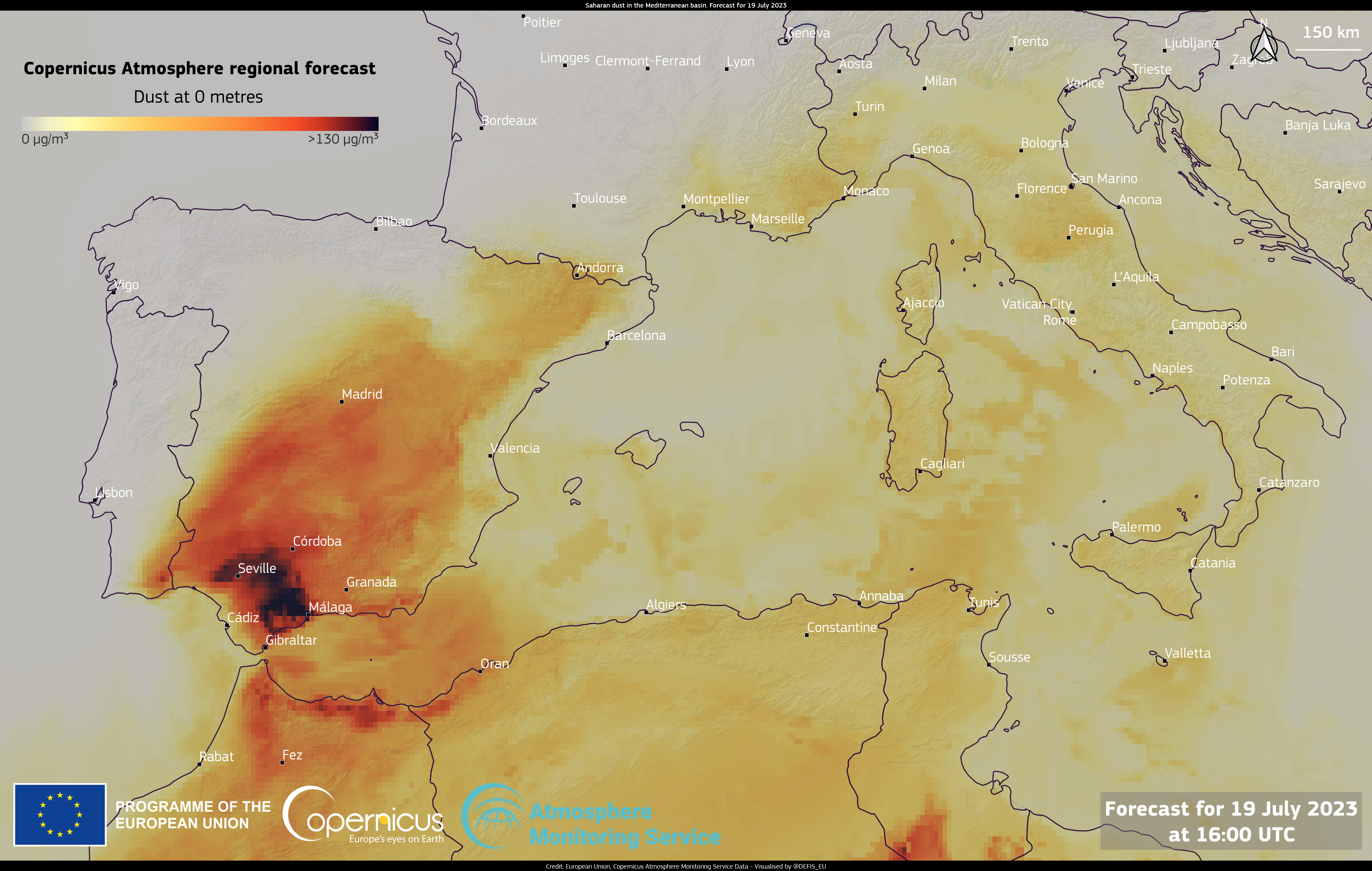
Saharan Dust, wildfires and extreme heat- Copernicus monitors extreme conditions in the Mediterranean basin.

The objective of the Copernicus Climate Change Service is to build an EU knowledge base in support of mitigation and adaptation policies for Climate Change and Global Warming. The goal of the operational Climate Change service is to provide reliable information about the current and past state of the climate, the forecasts on a seasonal time scale, and the more likely projections in the coming decades for various scenarios of greenhouse gas emissions and other Climate Change contributors.

In 2025, the Copernicus Climate Change Service reported that 2024 was the first year to exceed the 1.5°C threshold established by the Paris Agreement.
