= 2026 Kenya floods =

Natural disaster in Kenya

- Date: 6 March 2026 – late May 2026
- Location: 30 Counties nationwide, including Bungoma · Kajiado · Kiambu · Kirinyaga · Kisumu · Kwale · Makueni · Migori · Murang'a · Nairobi · Nakuru · Tharaka-Nithi · Mombasa
- Cause: Heavy rainfall
- Deaths: 112 (as of 3 April)
- Property damage: 6,953 households

Between early March and late May 2026, flash flooding caused by heavy rainfall affected parts of Kenya, particularly the capital, Nairobi, killing at least 66 people. Floodwaters inundated roads across the city after intense overnight rainfall caused rivers to overflow, sweeping away vehicles and stranding motorists. The victims died mainly from drowning or electrocution.

The flooding caused widespread disruption to transport and infrastructure in Nairobi, including the closure of major roads and power outages in several neighbourhoods. Flights at Jomo Kenyatta International Airport were also disrupted, with some aircraft diverted to the coastal city of Mombasa. Emergency responders, including the military and humanitarian agencies, were deployed to assist rescue operations and provide relief to affected residents.

== Background ==
Kenya experiences two principal rainy seasons each year: the long rains from March to May and the short rains from October to December, both of which can bring heavy rainfall and flooding across parts of the country. Kenya's floods have been linked to structural issues including rapid urbanisation, development on floodplains and riparian land, and drainage infrastructure that has not kept pace with the growth of cities such as Nairobi. Researchers have argued that these factors, combined with weak enforcement of land-use planning regulations and degradation of catchment areas, have increased the severity of flood impacts in recent years.

Kenya was affected by severe flooding in April–May 2024, when weeks of intense rainfall caused widespread flooding across large parts of the country. The floods have resulted in hundreds of deaths and the displacement of hundreds of thousands of people, while damaging homes, farmland and infrastructure in numerous counties.

Prior to the 2026 floods, the Kenya Meteorological Department issued a warning on 25 February 2026 forecasting heavy rainfall across several regions of the country. The advisory indicated that rainfall exceeding 20 millimetres within 24 hours was expected in some areas, including the central highlands and the Lake Victoria basin. Authorities warned that forecast conditions could lead to flash flooding, poor visibility and other weather-related hazards in affected areas.

== Flooding ==
Map by the Emergency Response Coordination Centre showing rainfall accumulation for 5–16 March and flood extent

Flash flooding began during the night of 6–7 March 2026 after heavy rainfall on 6 March caused the Nairobi River to burst its banks and inundate roads across the city. Vehicles were swept away and stranded motorists were rescued from flooded roads as water levels rose rapidly in several parts of the city. Major transport routes including Mombasa Road and Uhuru Highway were affected by flooding, causing severe traffic disruption. Floodwaters also disrupted operations at Jomo Kenyatta International Airport, forcing some flights to be diverted to Mombasa.

Flooding was also reported in several other counties, including Bungoma, Kajiado, Kiambu, Kirinyaga, Kisumu, Kwale, Makueni, Migori, Murang'a, Nakuru, and Tharaka-Nithi. Rescue operations were supported by a multi-agency response that included the deployment of a military rescue unit from the Kenya Defence Forces to assist emergency services, while humanitarian organisations including the Kenya Red Cross Society carried out search and rescue operations and assisted stranded residents as flooding blocked roads and disrupted transport across the city.

Police reported that 23 people had died in Nairobi following the overnight floods, with victims drowning or being electrocuted by damaged power lines. By the end of 7 March, government officials said the death toll had risen to 25 nationwide, including two children who died in Kitui County. The victims died mainly from drowning or electrocution. Thousands of residents were also displaced by the flooding. In Nairobi alone, approximately 3,500 households were affected, while in Kisumu County 381 households were impacted after the Sondu-Miriu River burst its banks.

On 8 March, rescue operations continued as emergency teams searched flooded neighbourhoods and vehicles for additional victims. Authorities warned that the death toll could rise as recovery operations continued across affected areas. By the end of that day, the death toll had reached 43, with 4,845 people displaced and 10,000 households affected.

On 13 March, authorities announced that the death toll had reached 62, including 46 men, eight women, and eight children. 33 of these were in Nairobi, 17 in the Eastern region, and seven in the Rift Valley region.

On 15 March, police reported four more deaths due to the floods, raising the death toll to 66.

On 18 March, authorities have announced 71 have died, 36 in the Nairobi area, 19 in the Eastern region, 8 in the Rift Valley, 4 in Nyanza region, 3 in coast, and one in the Central region.

On 3 April, the National Police Service updated the death toll to 112 people.

On the night of 25 April, flooding occurred in parts of Mwea Constituency, Kirinyaga County leaving villagers homeless. Farms were submerged in water and livestock like goats and chickens were killed or carried away by the currents, one villager was quoted as saying "We have lost everything" referring to his livelihood. Search and rescue was complicated by the destruction of infrastructure, preventing humanitarian aid reaching some of the worst affected areas.

Three consecutive days of heavy rainfall in the Mombasa sub-counties of Changamwe, Jomvu, Kisauni, Likoni, Mvita and Nyali caused flooding in the days preceding 24 April. This led to the displacement of 300 people as well as property damage. Damaged infrastructure included the Inuka Police Station, Al-Mandhry Mosque, the office of the Regional Commissioner, Tudor-Mworoto settlement and electricity poles in Mtongwe. Two Tanzanians who were at sea since 14 April were rescued at Bamburi Beach after turbulent seas and strong coastal winds forced their boat to drift from Pemba Island. The Red Cross reported flooding in Kwale County on the night of 23 April affecting 5 households and carrying one boda boda operator attempting to cross a flooded bridge.

On 3 May, the Kenya Police stated that 18 people had recently died from landslides in Tharaka Nithi, Elgeyo-Marakwet, and Kiambu counties. The primary flooding associated with the March–May long rains season continued until approximately the end of May 2026.

== Forecasts ==
The Kenya Meteorological Department forecasted intensified heavy rainfall from 20 March to 23 March which would wane on 24 March.

The Meteorological Department's April 2026 Climate Outlook forecasted that April would experience the peak of the rains. Some parts of the country would however have dry spells with others receiving heavy rain.

The Kenya Meteorological Department on 27 April forecasted continued rainfall in the Highlands East and West of the Rift Valley, Nairobi, the Rift Valley region, the Coast, and Northeastern Kenya. Citizens were notified of the increased risks of flooding, flash floods, reduced visibility on roads, rising river levels including in areas with no heavy rain, and possible landslides in high hilly regions. The Aberdare Range, Mount Kenya region and surrounding areas are among the most likely to experience landslides according to the department.

== Impacts ==
By 7 March, 71 vehicles had been carried away by flood waters in Nairobi.

By the end of March, at least 110 people had been confirmed dead across 30 counties, 6,953 households affected and at least 34,765 people displaced.

In Mombasa County, flooding in the days preceding 24 April led to the displacement of 300 people including 9 families, damaged at least 103 households and rendered Jomvu Model Hospital and Tudor Sub-County Health facility inaccessible.

== Response ==
Kenyan government officials said emergency response efforts were being coordinated between national and county authorities as rescue and recovery operations continued in affected areas. In a statement, President William Ruto said his government "stands in solidarity with every citizen affected" and was "acting swiftly to alleviate further suffering and safeguard lives". Ruto pledged to cover medical expenses for Kenyans affected by the floods and acknowledged that the country needed to improve its infrastructure to reduce the risk of such events in the future. Health authorities also warned of increased risks of water-borne diseases including cholera and malaria following the flooding, citing concerns about contaminated water supplies and stagnant floodwaters.
