= September 2026 nor'easter =

2026 storm in the northeastern United States

- Satellite image of the nor'easter near the Northeastern United States on September 26

Meteorological history
- Formed: September 23, 2026
- Dissipated: September 29, 2026

Extratropical cyclone
- Highest gusts: 81 mph (130 km/h) at Montauk, New York
- Lowest pressure: 986 hPa (mbar); 29.12 inHg

Overall effects
- Fatalities: 1
- Injuries: 4
- Damage: $750 million (2026 USD)
- Areas affected: Northeastern United States, Mid-Atlantic states
- Power outages: 200,000
- Part of the 2026–27 North American winter

An unusually strong, damaging, and rare nor'easter caused widespread impacts across the Northeastern United States in late September 2026. Although nor'easters typically strike in the late fall and winter, forecasters described this system as a rare, high-intensity early-season storm, drawing comparisons to Hurricane Sandy, Hurricane Irene, Hurricane Bob and Hurricane Gloria because of the scale of expected coastal flooding. Originating from an upper-level low as a frontal low-pressure system on September 23, the system meandered erratically off the U.S. East Coast gradually undergoing cyclogenesis as it approached the U.S. Northeast.

As of September 28, more than 200,000 people total have lost power across the Northeast, one person died in Brooklyn from a fallen tree, and nearly 550 flights have been cancelled. Gallagher Re estimated monetary losses to have reached $750 million dollars (2026 USD).

Meteorologists emphasized how unusual the storm's timing was, noting that nor'easters are far more common in the late fall and winter than in September. According to the Boston Globe, only about 1 percent of nor'easters on record have developed in September, a pattern typically associated with a surface front stalling off the mid-Atlantic coast beneath a dipping jet stream. NBC10 Boston similarly noted that while nor'easters can form at any time of year, they are most frequent in winter, making a storm of this strength forming in September especially rare, according to the National Weather Service.

== Meteorological history ==
Map plotting the storm's track and intensity, according to the Saffir–Simpson scale Map key Saffir–Simpson scale Tropical depression (≤38 mph, ≤62 km/h) Tropical storm (39–73 mph, 63–118 km/h) Category 1 (74–95 mph, 119–153 km/h) Category 2 (96–110 mph, 154–177 km/h) Category 3 (111–129 mph, 178–208 km/h) Category 4 (130–156 mph, 209–251 km/h) Category 5 (≥157 mph, ≥252 km/h) Unknown Storm type Tropical cyclone Subtropical cyclone Extratropical cyclone, remnant low, tropical disturbance, or monsoon depression

In late-September 2026, the Weather Prediction Center (WPC) began highlighting the possibility for development of a meandering coastal storm off the Eastern Seaboard. On September 23, a surface low pressure system developed under a slow-moving upper-level low off the Northern Mid-Atlantic coastline. Model forecasts were in good agreement that the low would meander south or southeast of Long Island, though slight differences in position could cause significantly different impacts in wind speed and direction. Throughout the next day, the low continued to meander offshore the Northern Mid-Atlantic and Northeastern U.S. bringing broad onshore flow onto those regions promoting marine hazards such as rip currents and high surf.

Satellite loop of the nor'easter swirling off the East Coast on September 26

On the morning of September 26, the nor'easter reached its peak intensity with a minimum central pressure of 986 mbar (29.12 inHg) as conditions began to deteriorate across the Northeast region. At 15:00 UTC, the Weather Prediction Center began issuing storm summaries, an occluded front extended eastward from the low south of Cape Cod, with radar indicating a large area of rain wrapping around the northern side of the low over the Delmarva Peninsula, eastern Pennsylvania, New Jersey, Long Island, and portions of southern New England. At 02:00 UTC on September 27, the nor'easter was positioned about 100 miles south of Long Island, where Montauk Point recorded a max wind gust of 81 mph (130 km/h). The nor'easter began to gradually weaken whilst centered along the New Jersey coast near Point Pleasant Beach as moderate coastal flooding continued to occur at that morning’s high tide. The low weakened further that night, weakening to a central pressure of 998 mbar (29.47 inHg) along the coast of Cape May, New Jersey. On September 29, the nor'easter turned to the northeast near far eastern Massachusetts.

== Preparations ==
=== Mid-Atlantic ===
New York MTA officials providing a weather update ahead of the nor'easter

Governor Kathy Hochul declared a state of emergency for New York City (NYC), Long Island, and Westchester County, while Governor Mikie Sherrill declared one for eight counties in New Jersey, both citing the threat of high winds, heavy rainfall, and coastal flooding. Mayor Zohran Mamdani separately issued a travel advisory for NYC. Ahead of the storm, the MTA issued a weather update to New Yorkers outlining precautionary measures for the transit system.

Businesses in Downtown Annapolis used sandbags provided by the city and other protective measures to prevent potential flooding from the nor'easter at high tide. A festival in Ocean City, Maryland was cancelled as a result of strong winds and beach erosion. Winds were gusting to 30 mph (48 km/h) and were expected to possibly reach 50 mph (80 km/h) on September 26. Coastal flood warnings were issued across beach communities including Ocean City, and Rehoboth and Bethany beaches in Delaware, as well as communities in Virginia. Southeast Virginia, from Virginia Beach to Norfolk, faced the highest risk for coastal flood inundation, at 1–3 ft (0.3–0.9 m).

Philadelphia was placed under a coastal flood and wind advisory by the National Weather Service office in Harrisburg due to its proximity to the shoreline; portions of central and eastern Pennsylvania were forecast to see gusts in excess of 28 mph (45 km/h).

=== New England ===
All Amtrak service between New York City and Boston was suspended during the nor'easter.

Governor Ned Lamont activated Connecticut's Emergency Operations Center (EOC) ahead of strong winds and heavy rain across the state, and ferry services between New London and Orient, New York were also cancelled. Boaters in Old Saybrook were encouraged to tighten and double their lines to prevent storm damage to their vessels and the dock.

The southern part of Rhode Island was put under a high wind warning, while wind advisories were issued for the northern part of the state. Four emergency shelters extended their hours in Providence, and access to the Mount Hope, Newport Pell, and Jamestown Verrazzano bridges was restricted by the Rhode Island Turnpike and Bridge Authority. Ferry cancellations occurred as well.

State officials in Massachusetts urged the public to reduce the risk of flooding by clearing debris from nearby storm drains, and encouraged drivers to minimize travel but to proceed with caution if necessary; all ferry services were cancelled from September 26–27. The City of Boston was placed under a coastal storm warning from September 25–27 by Mayor Michelle Wu, with forecasters predicting 2–4 in (51–102 mm) of rainfall for the city.

Though near the northern periphery of the storm, high surf and coastal flood advisories were issued along coastal Maine due to the risk of swells that may build to nearly 18 ft (5.5 m) offshore Cape Elizabeth, and minor coastal flooding of about 1–2 ft (0.3–0.6 m) along the rest of the Maine coast.

The National Weather Service placed New Hampshire's coast under a gale warning, a high surf advisory, a small craft advisory, and a coastal flood advisory, effective the morning of September 25, 2026.

== Impact ==
The September 2026 nor'easter made landfall in New Jersey on September 27, 2026

=== Mid-Atlantic ===
==== New York and New Jersey ====
As the strong nor'easter pounded Long Island, New York City experienced flooding particularly in streets and highways in low-lying areas by the coast, two people abandoned their vehicles due to rising floodwaters in Elmhurst, Queens, occasional lightning strikes occurred within embedded convection from the outer bands of the storm as it moved in from the east. Storm surge reached 3.54 ft (1.08 m) in Kings Park, New York. Jersey Central Power and Light reported more than 17,300 power outages in New Jersey statewide as strong winds approaching 50 mph (80 km/h) brought down trees, large branches and power lines. New Jersey Route 35 remained closed at the Sayreville-Old Bridge border due to flooding. A high tide on September 26 pushed water levels in Atlantic City to their highest point since Hurricane Sandy in 2012, and officials in the city warned that conditions were among the worst since that storm. Rainfall totals in New Jersey reached 6.78 in (172 mm) in Neptune. The Long Beach Branch of the Long Island Rail Road was suspended from Valley Stream to Long Beach. Fallen trees also resulted in the North Jersey Coast Line of NJ Transit being suspended. A swimmer off the coast of Robert Moses State Park went missing, though was later found alive. The New York Yankees were forced to cancel their regular season finale due to the nor'easter impacts. Up to 10.40 in (264 mm) of rain was recorded at Orient Point. In Brooklyn, one tree fell and killed a man, while another fell and injured at least four others.

==== Delaware, Maryland, and Pennsylvania ====
High tides and waves caused beach erosion in Delaware. Flooding resulted in the closure of Delaware Route 1 between Bethany Beach to Dewey Beach. In Maryland, Ocean City was impacted by coastal flooding and beaches saw significant erosion. To the north in Pennsylvania, over 14,000 customers were without power on September 26. Downed trees and utility poles caused some property damage. Several delays were reported at the 30th Street Station in Philadelphia.

=== New England ===
==== Southern New England ====
Fallen trees and flooding resulted in road closures across Connecticut. A state maximum of 4.2 in (107 mm) of rain fell over Durham, Connecticut. Across the state, 35,000 customers lost power.

In Massachusetts, winds began to intensify on the afternoon of September 25. Gusts of over 60 mph (97 km/h) were recorded in parts of the state, with Wellfleet reporting a gust of 70 mph (110 km/h). About 6,600 customers lost power across the state by 4 p.m. on September 26, and approximately 1,500 customers remained without power around 3 a.m. Monday, September 28, particularly in Lawrence, Woburn, and Bedford.

Winds reaching close to 55 mph (89 km/h) struck Rhode Island. Rhode Island Energy reported over 31,000 customers were impacted due to falling trees damaging power lines.

==== Northern New England ====
High surf impacted the coast of Maine, though was not as high as originally forecasted. The Pemaquid Point Lighthouse was closed due to the storm. A car was damaged by a wave in Kennebunk.

As of Sunday, September 27, 2026, New Hampshire officials were reporting 4,500 power outages.

=== Other states ===
North Carolina Highway 12 was closed after it was damaged by heavy overwash and strong winds, cutting off the islands of Hatteras and Ocracoke from the mainland.

A wind gust of 51 mph (82 km/h) was recorded at Cape Henry, Virginia.

== See also ==
- Nor'easter
- November 2026 nor'easter
- January 30 – February 2, 2026 nor'easter
- Hurricane Sandy
- Hurricane Irene
- Hurricane Bob
- Hurricane Gloria
