= Checkerboard, Montana =

- Unincorporated community
- Location within Montana Location within the United States
- Coordinates: 46°34′21″N 110°32′49″W
- Country: United States
- State: Montana
- County: Meagher
- Elevation: 5,246 ft (1,599 m)
- Time zone: UTC-7 (Mountain (MST))
  - Summer (DST): UTC-6 (MDT)
- Area code: 406
- GNIS feature ID: 806920

Checkerboard is an unincorporated community in Meagher County, Montana, United States. The community is along U.S. Route 12 17 miles (27 km) east of White Sulphur Springs.

Checkerboard takes its name from nearby Checkerboard Creek, though the origin of the creek's name is uncertain. As of 1995, it had a year-round population of 22 and a summer population of 30 to 50 residents. It is home to an annual Labor Day parade, which the Billings Gazette speculated may be the smallest parade in Montana.
