= South of Scotland =

South of Scotland may refer to:

- The southern portion of Scotland
  - Geography of Scotland
- South of Scotland (Scottish Parliament electoral region) (1999–2011)
- South Scotland (Scottish Parliament electoral region) (2011–present)
- South of Scotland (European Parliament constituency) (1979–1999)
- South of Scotland District (rugby union), a rugby union team
