= List of Southern Hemisphere tropical cyclone seasons =

The tropical cyclone seasons that occur in the Southern Hemisphere are:

- South-West Indian Ocean tropical cyclone
  - Current – 2026–27 South-West Indian Ocean cyclone season
- Australian region tropical cyclone
  - Current – 2025–26 Australian region cyclone season
- South Pacific tropical cyclone
  - Current – 2026–27 South Pacific cyclone season
- South Atlantic tropical cyclone

== See also ==
- List of Northern Hemisphere tropical cyclone seasons
