= 2026–27 Australian region cyclone season =

Cyclone season in Australia

- Season summary map

Seasonal boundaries
- First system formed: 16 November 2026
- Last system dissipated: Season ongoing

Strongest storm
- Name: 01U
  - Maximum winds: 65 km/h (40 mph)
  - Lowest pressure: 1003 hPa (mbar)

Seasonal statistics
- Tropical lows: 1
- Tropical cyclones: 0
- Severe tropical cyclones: 0
- Total fatalities: None
- Total damage: None

Related articles
- 2026–27 South-West Indian Ocean cyclone season; 2026–27 South Pacific cyclone season

The 2026–27 Australian region cyclone season is the current season of the annual Australian region cyclone season in the Southern Hemisphere. The season officially began on 1 November 2026, and will end on 30 April 2027. These dates conventionally delimit the period of each year when most tropical and subtropical cyclones form in the basin, which is east of 90°E and south of the Equator. However, tropical cyclones can form year-round with any cyclone forming between 1 July 2026 and 30 June 2027. Tropical and subtropical cyclones in this basin are monitored by the Bureau of Meteorology and unofficially by the Joint Typhoon Warning Center.

== Systems ==
=== Tropical Low 01U ===
- Tropical low (Australian scale)
- Duration: 16 November – 21 November
- Peak intensity: 65 km/h (40 mph) (10-min); 1003 hPa (mbar)

In early November, a westerly wind burst occurred in the eastern Indian Ocean, which spawned two disturbances on either side of the equator. The northern system would develop into Cyclonic Storm Akvan, while the southern system would become 01U. The Joint Typhoon Warning Center began tracking the southern disturbance on 13 November, noting it was located within 2 degrees south of the equator. On 16 November, the Australian Bureau of Meteorology designated the system Tropical Low 01U, while it was situated east of Sumatra.

== Storm names ==
=== Bureau of Meteorology ===
The Australian Bureau of Meteorology (TCWC Melbourne) monitors all tropical cyclones that form within the Australian region, including any within the areas of responsibility of TCWC Jakarta or TCWC Port Moresby. Should a tropical low reach tropical cyclone strength within the BoM's area of responsibility, it will be assigned the next name from the following naming list. The names Oran and Riordan were originally planned to be used for the first time this season, after replacing Oswald and Rusty respectively, from the 2012–13 season, but the name Oran was swapped with Owen for unknown reasons.

- Owen (unused)
- Peta (unused)
- Riordan (unused)
- Sandra (unused)
- Tim (unused)
- Victoria (unused)
- Zane (unused)
- Alessia (unused)

=== TCWC Jakarta ===
TCWC Jakarta monitors Tropical Cyclones from the Equator to 10°S and from 90°E to 145°E. Should a Tropical Depression reach Tropical Cyclone strength within TCWC Jakarta's Area of Responsibility then it will be assigned the next name from the following list.

- Cempaka (unused)
- Dahlia (unused)
- Flamboyan (unused)
- Kenanga (unused)
- Lili (unused)
- Melati (unused)
- Rambutan (unused)
- Teratai (unused)

=== TCWC Port Moresby ===
Tropical cyclones that develop north of 11°S between 151°E and 160°E are assigned names by the Tropical Cyclone Warning Centre in Port Moresby, Papua New Guinea. Tropical cyclone formation in this area is rare, with Maila from the previous season being the first named cyclone in the region since 2007.

- Alu (unused)
- Buri (unused)
- Emau (unused)
- Fere (unused)
- Hibu (unused)
- Ila (unused)
- Kama (unused)
- Lobu (unused)
- Nou (unused)
- Paia (unused)

== Season effects ==
An eventual table will list all of the tropical cyclones and subtropical cyclones that were monitored during the 2026–2027 Australian region cyclone season. Information on their intensity, duration, name, areas affected, primarily comes from the BoM. Death and damage reports come from either press reports or the relevant national disaster management agency while the damage totals are given in 2026 or 2027 USD.

2026–27 Australian region cyclone season
Name	Dates	Peak intensity			Areas affected	Damage (US$)	Deaths
Name	Dates	Category	Wind speed (km/h (mph))	Pressure (hPa)	Areas affected	Damage (US$)	Deaths
01U	16–21 Nov	Tropical low	65 (40)	1003	Indonesia (particularly Sumatra)	None	0
Season aggregates
1 system	16 Nov – Present		65 (40)	1003		None	

== See also ==
- Weather of 2026 and 2027
- List of Southern Hemisphere cyclone seasons
- Tropical cyclones in 2026 and 2027
- Atlantic hurricane seasons: 2026, 2027
- Pacific hurricane seasons: 2026, 2027
- Pacific typhoon seasons: 2026, 2027
- North Indian Ocean cyclone seasons: 2026, 2027
- 2026–27 South-West Indian Ocean cyclone season
- 2026–27 South Pacific cyclone season
