= Joint Typhoon Warning Center =

Joint United States Navy – United States Air Force command

Agency overview
- Formed: May 1, 1959; 67 years ago
- Headquarters: Pearl Harbor, Hawaii
- Employees: 61 (2020)
- Parent agency: United States Navy; United States Air Force
- Website: metoc.navy.mil/jtwc

The Joint Typhoon Warning Center (JTWC) is a joint United States Navy – United States Air Force command in Pearl Harbor, Hawaii. The JTWC is responsible for the issuing of tropical cyclone warnings in the northwest Pacific Ocean, south Pacific Ocean, and Indian Ocean for all branches of the U.S. Department of Defense and other U.S. government agencies. Their warnings are intended primarily for the protection of U.S. military ships and aircraft, as well as military installations jointly operated with other countries around the world. Its U.S. Navy components are aligned with the Naval Meteorology and Oceanography Command.

== History ==
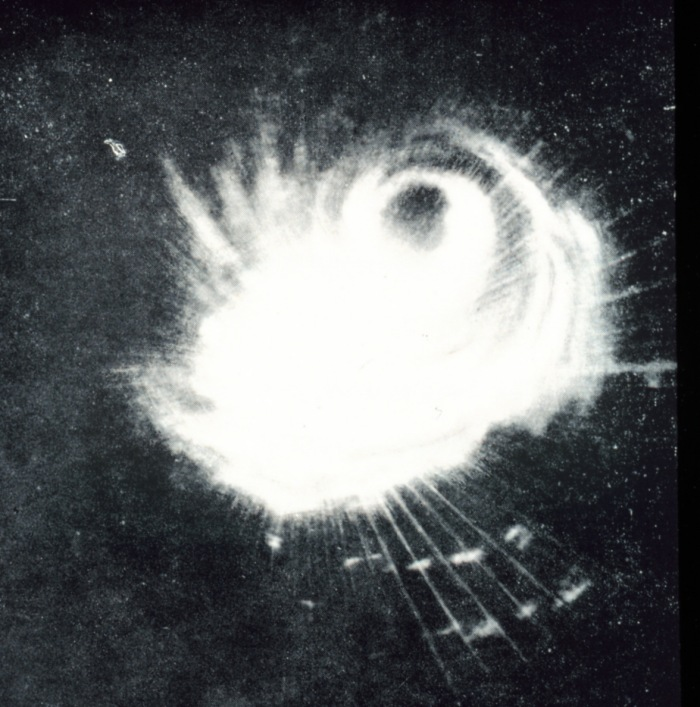
Radar image of Typhoon Cobra

The origins of the Joint Typhoon Warning Center (JTWC) can be traced back to June 1945, when the Fleet Weather Center/Typhoon Tracking Center was established on the island of Guam, after multiple typhoons, including Typhoon Cobra of December 1944 and Typhoon Connie in June 1945, had caused a significant loss of men and ships. At that time, the center was one of three Navy and two Air Force units responsible for tropical cyclone reconnaissance and warnings in the Pacific. Over the next few years, the coordination of tropical warnings between the centers was at times difficult or impossible due to various communication problems.

During 1958, the United States Department of Defense weather services and the Weather Bureau formed the Joint Meteorology Committee to the Pacific Command and proposed the formation of a joint Navy and Air Force center for typhoon analysis and forecasting. A committee was subsequently set up to study the issue which issued a report during January 1959, which gave recommendation that the center be set up. Based on the report and the conclusions reached at the March 1959 Annual Tropical Cyclone Conference, the Joint Meteorology Committee formally urged, the Commander in Chief, U.S. Pacific Command (CINCPAC) to establish a Joint Typhoon Warning Center. The CINCPAC subsequently petitioned the Joint Chiefs of Staff, who gave permission for the center to be set up effective May 1, 1959, under the command of the Fleet Weather Center's commander.

The JTWC initially consisted of ten people with two officers and three enlisted personnel provided by each service. It was required to provide warnings on all tropical cyclones between the Malay Peninsula and the International Dateline for U.S. government agencies. They also had to determine reconnaissance requirements, prepare annual typhoon summaries, and conduct research into tropical cyclone forecasting and detection. In November 1962, Typhoon Karen destroyed the building housing the Fleet Weather Center/Joint Typhoon Warning Center. It relocated to a more typhoon-proof building in 1965.

Between 1971 and 1976, CINCPAC gradually expanded the JTWC's area of responsibility, to include the area between the International Dateline and the African coasts. In October 1978, the Fleet Weather Center/JTWC became the Navy Oceanographic Command Center/Joint Typhoon Warning Center and responsible for the whole oceanic environment, from the bottom of the ocean to the top of the atmosphere. The JTWC subsequently started issuing warnings for the Southern Hemisphere between the African coast and the International Dateline during October of 1980. It was relocated to Pearl Harbor on January 1, 1999, due to the 1995 Base Realignment and Closure Commission round. During October 2011, the JTWC's name changed from the "Naval Maritime Forecast Center/Joint Typhoon Warning Center" to just the Joint Typhoon Warning Center, as it became a stand-alone command for the first time in its 52-year history.

=== Alternate Joint Typhoon Warning Center ===
In case of debilitation of the agency, the Alternate Joint Typhoon Warning Center (AJTWC) assumes JTWC's functions. The AJTWC was first designated as the Tokyo Weather Central by the Fleet Weather Facility in Yokosuka, Japan, before eventually being re-designated to Pearl Harbor in November 1977. The first time the AJTWC had to activate was after Typhoon Omar passed above Guam in 1992, incapacitating the JTWC for 11 days. The AJTWC was then relocated back to Yokosuka as part of the 1995 Base Realignment and Closure Commission.

== Standards and practices ==
JTWC's Tropical Cyclone Intensity Scale
Category	Sustained winds
Super typhoon	≥130 knots ≥240 km/h
Typhoon	64–129 knots 118–239 km/h
Tropical Storm	34–63 knots 63–117 km/h
Tropical Depression	≤33 knots ≤62 km/h

As of 2020, the center was staffed by 61 U.S. Air Force and Navy personnel. The JTWC uses several satellite systems and sensors, radar, surface and upper level synoptic data as well as atmospheric models to complete its mission. The need for a more modernized method for forecasting tropical cyclones had become apparent by the 1980s. Prior to the development of the Automated Tropical Cyclone Forecasting System (ATCF), the tools used by the Department of Defense to forecast tropical cyclone track were acetate, grease pencils, and disparate computer programs. The ATCF software was developed by the Naval Research Laboratory for the JTWC beginning in 1986 and used since 1988. It was adapted for use at the National Hurricane Center (NHC) in 1990.

JTWC adheres to the World Meteorological Organization's (WMO) rules for storm names and adheres to acknowledged guidelines for intensity of tropical cyclones and tropical storms, with the exception of using the U.S. standard of measuring sustained winds for 1-min instead of the 10-min span recommended by the WMO (see Saffir-Simpson Hurricane Scale). The JTWC is not one of the WMO designated Regional Specialized Meteorological Centres, nor one of its tropical cyclone warning centers, as its main mission is to support the United States government agencies. JTWC monitors, analyzes, and forecasts tropical cyclone formation, development, and movement year round. Its area of responsibility covers 89% of the world's tropical cyclone activity. The way the JTWC labels tropical cyclones vary depending on the location and intensity of the cyclone. A scale is used for systems in the Western Pacific based on the wind speed. Elsewhere of the agency's responsibility area, all systems with a wind speed of at least 34 knots (63 km/h) are labeled as "Tropical Cyclone", regardless of the estimated intensity.

When monitoring disturbances, the agency labels them as an invest (short for investigation area), and numbers them from 90 to 99, followed by a "W" (West Pacific), "B" (Bay of Bengal), "A" (Arabian Sea), "S" (South Indian Ocean), or "P" (South Pacific), based on the location of the system. The numbers are rotated for each time a disturbance forms within a basin, meaning the next invest in the same basin after 99 would be numbered 90.

== Products ==
=== Tropical Cyclone Warnings ===
A tropical cyclone warning is a text message issued about a tropical cyclone by the JTWC. It contains the storm's position and direction, wind speed and the wind distribution, the forecasts of them, and the remarks of the information. Warnings are updated every six hours for the North Pacific and North Indian Ocean (00Z, 06Z, 12Z, 18Z), and are updated every twelve hours for the South Pacific and South Indian Ocean (00Z, 12Z). For a warning to be issued, a storm system must meet one or more of the following criteria:

- It must have a closed circulation and maximum sustained winds of 25 kn (45 km/h; 30 mph) in the North Pacific or 35 kn (65 km/h; 40 mph) in the South Pacific and Indian Oceans.
- Its maximum sustained winds within the close circulation are expected to increase to 35 kn (65 km/h; 40 mph) or greater within 48 hours.
- It may endanger life and/or property within 72 hours.
- USINDOPACOM directs the JTWC to begin warnings

A graphic is produced in each warning in a low-bandwidth image tailored for mariners. Like the National Hurricane Center (NHC), the error cone accounts for basin-specific 5-year average uncertainty in the center location but is expanded to include the size of the storm (in the form of the maximum 34-knot wind radius at each time). For this reason, the JTWC error cone will always be larger than the NHC error cone, provided the tropical cyclone is producing at least 34-knot winds. On the graphic, the shaded zone represents the potential area of tropical storm force winds and is referred to as the avoidance area by Navy ship routing officers. A different graphic may be issued on the "off-hour" tropical cyclone fix cycles (03Z, 09Z, 15Z, 21Z) if a tropical cyclone is within 180 nmi (210 mi; 330 km) of one of the six designated installations in the Western North Pacific, when one of these installations sets TCCOR 2 or higher on the Tropical Cyclone Condition of Readiness scale, or when the JTWC is directed by USINDOPACOM.

A warning may be amended whenever a significant change is made to the forecast track, intensity, and/or tropical cyclone best track position before the next regular warning is issued, or it may be corrected due to administrative or typographical errors. Additionally, the JTWC may issue a relocated warning to indicate a significant re-assessment of the tropical cyclone's location and movement.

=== Prognostic Reasoning ===
Prognostic Reasoning Messages are bulletins that accompany a tropical cyclone warning and discuss the tropical cyclone, and are intended to be for meteorologists. They are released at the synoptic time plus three hours (0300Z, 0900Z, 1500Z, or 2100Z), and contain two sections: the 6 hour summary and analysis, and forecast discussion. The former section includes details on the position and intensity of the system, the satellite imagery, the steering mechanism of the system, and the environment the cyclone is in (covering vertical wind shear, sea surface temperature, and outflow) and forecaster assessment, as well as the confidence of the position, intensity, and wind radii. It also compares the Dvorak estimates of agencies. The latter section covers significant changes in forecast (if any) and discusses said forecast and forecast models, and covers the confidence in the forecast. Prior to June 21, 2021, only tropical cyclones in the Western Pacific had their own Prognostic Reasoning Message, and those in the Indian Ocean would have the discussion in the remarks section of warning text messages.

=== Significant Tropical Weather Advisory ===
Released daily, a Significant Tropical Weather Advisory discusses any tropical disturbances within the JTWC's area of responsibility and their potential for further tropical cyclogenesis. Two separate bulletins are issued for the Western Pacific and the Indian Ocean. The bulletin indicates the chance of becoming a tropical cyclone for each tropical disturbance based on the environment that the disturbance is situated in. The disturbances are categorized as one of the following:

- Low: Unlikely to develop into a significant tropical cyclone within the next 24 hours.
- Medium: Higher potential and may develop into a significant tropical cyclone beyond 24 hours.
- High: Likely to develop into a significant tropical cyclone within the next 24 hours; a Tropical Cyclone Formation Alert is issued under this circumstance.

In October 2019, the JTWC modified the bulletin format to include subtropical systems and clarity, stating that the RSMC issues warnings on subtropical systems whereas the JTWC does not.

=== Tropical Cyclone Formation Alert ===
A Tropical Cyclone Formation Alert (TCFA) is issued when an area of disturbed weather (designated an invest) has a high chance to develop into a tropical cyclone within the following 24 hours. It briefly describes the meteorological environment and how it could aid in development of the system. The alert is then accompanied by a graphic depicting the path of the disturbance and a forecast path. The forecast path is depicted as either a rectangle with a centerline—indicating that the invest would follow along the centerline—or a circle around the disturbance's current position—indicating uncertainty of its future direction. The necessity of such issuance is based on data gathered on the synoptic scale, and utilizes satellite or other pertinent data. The JTWC follows a checklist to determine whether or not a TCFA should be issued on tropical disturbances. The checklist contains five sections and a miscellaneous section for special cases, covering conditions in the atmosphere starting from the surface to 200 millibar level (35,000 to 41,000 feet (11,000 to 12,000 m) above the surface) as well as sea surface temperatures, while also utilizing the Dvorak technique. If there are a total of at least 35 points, a TCFA shall be issued.

=== Annual Tropical Cyclone Report ===
An Annual Tropical Cyclone Report (ATCR) is prepared by the staff of the JTWC, describing operationally or meteorologically significant cyclones that occurred within the JTWC's responsibility area. Details highlight significant challenges and/or shortfalls in the tropical cyclone warning system and serve as a focal point for future research and development efforts. Also included are tropical cyclone reconnaissance statistics and a summary of research and development efforts, operational tactics, techniques and procedure development, and outreach that members of the JTWC conducted or contributed to throughout the year. .

== See also ==
- National Hurricane Center
- Invest (meteorology)
- 2026 Pacific hurricane season
- 2026 Pacific typhoon season
- 2026 North Indian Ocean cyclone season
- 2026–27 South-West Indian Ocean cyclone season
- 2026–27 Australian region cyclone season
- 2026–27 South Pacific cyclone season
