= 2026–27 South-West Indian Ocean cyclone season =

Tropical cyclone season

- Season summary map

Seasonal boundaries
- First system formed: 19 October 2026
- Last system dissipated: Season ongoing

Strongest storm
- Name: Agueda
  - Maximum winds: 95 km/h (60 mph) (10-minute sustained)
  - Lowest pressure: 995 hPa (mbar)

Seasonal statistics
- Total disturbances: 2
- Total depressions: 2
- Total storms: 2
- Total fatalities: Unknown
- Total damage: Unknown

Related articles
- 2026–27 Australian region cyclone season; 2026–27 South Pacific cyclone season

The 2026-27 South-West Indian Ocean cyclone season is an ongoing event of the annual South-West Indian Ocean cyclone season in the Southern Hemisphere. The season officially began on 15 November 2026, and ends on 30 April 2027, with the exception for Mauritius and the Seychelles, for which will end on 15 May 2027. These dates conventionally delimit the period of each year when most tropical and subtropical cyclones form in the basin, which is west of 90°E and south of the Equator. However, tropical cyclones can form year-round with any cyclone forming between 1 July 2026 and 30 June 2027, such as Agueda. Tropical and subtropical cyclones in this basin are monitored by the Regional Specialised Meteorological Centre in Réunion and unofficially by the Joint Typhoon Warning Center.

== Seasonal forecasts ==
Record	Moderate Tropical Storm		Tropical Cyclone
Average	10		5
Record high	15 (2018–19)		11 (2018–19)
Record low	3 (1982–83)		0 (1982–83)
Forecast center	Systems		
Météo-France	6-10		3-5
Mauritius; Meteorological; Services	5-7		N/A
Forecast center	Chance of below/near/above average		
Météo-France	70%	20%	10%

On October 28, 2026, Météo-France forecasted that the cyclonic activity season in the Southwest Indian Ocean basin would see below-normal, driven by an exceptionally strong 2026–2027 El Niño event, coinciding with a negative phase of the Indian Ocean Subtropical Dipole. RSMC La Réunion estimated a 70% probability of below-normal activity. The most likely scenario, therefore, was for between 6 and 10 storms (including Storm Agueda) to develop, with 3 to 5 of these reaching the stage of a tropical cyclone..

Activity was expected to concentrate primarily to the north and northeast of the Mascarene Islands, with systems generally moving toward the south or southeast—a pattern facilitated by a weaker-than-usual Mascarene High. Consequently, the risk of impact on Madagascar and Mozambique was considered lower, while the risk for the Mascarene Islands (Rodrigues, Mauritius, and La Réunion) remained near normal.

Mauritius Meteorological Services has the same evaluation of the situation but is even more restrictive on the number of storms (5 to 7).

== Seasonal summary ==
The season began with the formation of Moderate Tropical Storm Agueda on October 19.

== Systems ==
=== Severe Tropical Storm Agueda ===
- Severe tropical storm (MFR)
- Tropical storm (SSHWS)
- Duration: 19 October – 23 October
- Peak intensity: 95 km/h (60 mph) (10-min); 995 hPa (mbar)

On 19 October 2026, Météo-France La Réunion (MFR) began issuing advisories on the system formerly tracked as Zone of Disturbed Weather 01, which intensified into a moderate tropical storm and was named Agueda while moving slowly southwestward north of the Seychelles. Agueda’s cloud pattern gradually improved over the next 3 days, reaching its peak intensity of 60 mph (10-min) and a minimum pressure of 995 mbar (29.38 inHg) on 22 October, 12:00 UTC. Shortly after peaking, the system’s convective structure waned as Agueda began entering a northerly sheared environment, causing the circulation to weaken and slightly expand. By the next day, convective activity collapsed, exposing the low-level circulation (LLC); despite multiple attempts of convective reorganization over Agueda’s exposed LLC, the storm’s remnants dissipated off the coast of Kenya on 27 October.

While passing near the Seychelles, Agueda dropped heavy rainfall, leading to flooding and landslides. On 21 October, the Tanzania Meteorological Authority warned that the system could enhance rainfall in coastal Tanzania.

=== Moderate Tropical Storm 02 ===
- Moderate tropical storm (MFR)
- Tropical storm (SSHWS)
- Duration: 5 November – 8 November
- Peak intensity: 65 km/h (40 mph) (10-min); 1003 hPa (mbar)

On 5 November, MFR began issuing advisories on Zone of Disturbed Weather 02 northeast of Agaléga; consisting of an elongated low-level circulation and offset convective organization near the system’s center. The consolidation of the inner circulation early on 7 November prompted the classification of Tropical Depression 02; regardless, the system remained disorganized due to the presence of westerly wind shear displacing much of its convection to the southeast. A 17:07 UTC scatterometer pass observed gale-force winds along an asymmetrical LLC, leading to the Joint Typhoon Warning Center (JTWC) issuing warnings on 03S. By 12:00 UTC the next day, the system continued to maintain a sheared configuration, the circulation was easily discernible on visible satellite imagery and was deemed a filling low-pressure system while gradually moving to the northwest by MFR; advisory bulletins were ceased. The JTWC continued to monitor 03S as a tropical cyclone. Final warnings from the JTWC were issued on 8 November, 21:00 UTC. The dissipating remnants passed off the northern tip of Madagascar the following night, and then moved north of the Mozambique Channel, near Aldabra, over the next couple of days. Later in November, the RSMC La Réunion reanalyzed the system, upgrading it to a moderate tropical storm without giving it a name.

== Storm names ==
Within the South-West Indian Ocean, tropical depressions and subtropical depressions that are judged to have 10-minute sustained windspeeds of 65 km/h (40 mph) by the Regional Specialized Meteorological Centre on Réunion island, France (RSMC La Réunion) are usually assigned a name. However, it is the Sub-Regional Tropical Cyclone Advisory Centres in Mauritius and Madagascar who name the systems. The Sub-Regional Tropical Cyclone Advisory Centre (Mauritius Meteorological Services) in Mauritius names a storm if it intensifies into a moderate tropical storm between 55°E and 90°E. If instead a cyclone intensifies into a moderate tropical storm between 30°E and 55°E then the Sub-Regional Tropical Cyclone Advisory Centre (Meteo Madagascar) in Madagascar assigns the appropriate name to the storm. Storm names are taken from three pre-determined lists of names, which rotate on a triennial basis, with any names that have been used automatically removed. New names this season are: Agueda, Bertrand, Celiwe, Dira, Emmie, Fikri, Gumbo, Hisna, Isaura, Pitsana and Wafula, which replaced Alvaro, Belal, Candice, Djoungou, Eleanor, Filipo, Gamane, Hidaya and Ialy during the 2023–24 season, and also the unused names Pelagie and Wagner, however the reason for their removals are unknown.

- Agueda
- Bertrand (unused)
- Celiwe (unused)
- Dira (unused)
- Emmie (unused)
- Fikri (unused)
- Gumbo (unused)
- Hisna (unused)
- Isaura (unused)
- Jeremy (unused)
- Kanga (unused)
- Ludzi (unused)
- Melina (unused)
- Noah (unused)
- Onias (unused)
- Pitsana (unused)
- Quamar (unused)
- Rita (unused)
- Solani (unused)
- Tarik (unused)
- Urilia (unused)
- Vuyane (unused)
- Wafula (unused)
- Xusa (unused)
- Yarona (unused)
- Zacarias (unused)

== Season effects ==
An eventual table will list all of the tropical cyclones and subtropical cyclones that will be monitored during the 2026–2027 South-West Indian Ocean cyclone season. Information on their intensity, duration, name, areas affected, primarily comes from RSMC La Réunion. Death and damage reports come from either press reports or the relevant national disaster management agency while the damage totals are given in 2026 or 2027 USD.

Name	Dates	Peak intensity			Areas affected	Damage (USD)	Deaths	Ref(s).
Name	Dates	Category	Wind speed	Pressure	Areas affected	Damage (USD)	Deaths	Ref(s).
Agueda	19–23 October	Severe tropical storm	95 km/h (60 mph)	995 hPa (29.38 inHg)	Seychelles	Minimal	None	
02	5–8 November	Moderate tropical storm	65 km/h (40 mph)	1003 hPa (29.62 inHg)	Agaléga, Madagascar	None	None	
Season aggregates
2 systems	19 October 2026 – Season ongoing		95 km/h (60 mph)	995 hPa (29.38 inHg)		None	None	

== See also ==
- Weather of 2026 and 2027
- List of Southern Hemisphere cyclone seasons
- Tropical cyclones in 2026 and 2027
- Atlantic hurricane seasons: 2026, 2027
- Pacific hurricane seasons: 2026, 2027
- Pacific typhoon seasons: 2026, 2027
- North Indian Ocean cyclone seasons: 2026, 2027
- 2026–27 Australian region cyclone season
- 2026–27 South Pacific cyclone season
