= 2026–27 South Pacific cyclone season =

- Season summary map

Seasonal boundaries
- First system formed: 14 October 2026
- Last system dissipated: Season ongoing

Strongest storm
- Name: Xavier
  - Maximum winds: 220 km/h (140 mph) (10-minute sustained)
  - Lowest pressure: 910 hPa (mbar)

Seasonal statistics
- Total disturbances: 2
- Total depressions: 2
- Tropical cyclones: 2
- Severe tropical cyclones: 1
- Total fatalities: None
- Total damage: Unknown

Related articles
- 2026–27 South-West Indian Ocean cyclone season; 2026–27 Australian region cyclone season

The 2026–27 South Pacific cyclone season is an ongoing event in the annual cycle of tropical cyclone formation in the Southern Hemisphere. The season had the earliest first named storm since the 2018–19 season, in stark contrast to the previous season, which set the record for the latest first named storm on record in the basin. The 2026–27 season officially began on 1 November, 2026, and will end on 30 April, 2027. These dates conventionally delimit the period of each year when most tropical and subtropical cyclones form in the basin, which is west of 160°E and south of the Equator. However, tropical cyclones can form year-round with any cyclone forming between 1 July, 2026, and 30 June, 2027, as demonstrated by Wati, which formed on 14 October, 2026. Tropical and subtropical cyclones in this basin are monitored by the Fiji Meteorological Service, Australian Bureau of Meteorology and New Zealand's MetService and unofficially by the Joint Typhoon Warning Center.

== Seasonal forecasts ==
Source/Record	Region	Tropical Cyclone	Severe Tropical Cyclones	Ref
Records
Average (1969–70 – 2025–26):	160°E – 120°W	7	3	
Record high:	160°E – 120°W	1997–98: 16	1982–83: 9	
Record low:	160°E – 120°W	1990–91: 2 (tie)	2008–09: 0 (tie)	
Predictions
ESNZ October	135°E – 120°W	7–11	2–4	
FMS Whole	160°E – 120°W	11–15	6–8	
FMS Western	160°E – 180°	5–6	2–3	
FMS Eastern	180° – 120°W	8–10	4–5	

Ahead of the season officially starting on 1 November, the Fiji Meteorological Service (FMS) and Earth Sciences New Zealand (ESNZ), both issued a tropical cyclone outlook that discussed the upcoming season. These outlooks took into account a variety of factors such as a developing strong El Niño event and what had happened in previous seasons such as 1972-73, 1977-78, 1982–83, 1991–92, 1997–98, 2015–16. The Southwest Pacific tropical cyclone outlook issued by Earth Sciences New Zealand (ESNZ) in conjunction with MetService and various other Pacific meteorological services, predicted that seven to eleven tropical cyclones would occur over the South Pacific Ocean between 135°E and 120°W. The outlook also predicted that six to eight of these tropical cyclones would intensify further and become either a Category three, four or five severe tropical cyclone on the Australian tropical cyclone intensity scale. In addition to contributing towards the Southwest Pacific tropical cyclone outlook, the FMS predicted that between eleven and fifteen tropical cyclones would occur within the basin, while six to eight of these tropical cyclones were expected to intensify further and become either a category three, four or five severe tropical cyclone on the Australian scale. Both outlooks also predicted that the majority of systems would occur to the east of the International Dateline

== Systems ==
=== Tropical Cyclone Wati ===
- Category 2 tropical cyclone (Australian scale)
- Category 1 tropical cyclone (SSHWS)
- Duration: 14 October – 19 October
- Peak intensity: 100 km/h (65 mph) (10-min); 975 hPa (mbar)

At 18:00 UTC on 14 October, the FMS began monitoring the first tropical disturbance of the season. The disturbance was noted to be in a moderately sheared environment, albeit countered by good divergence and warm sea surface temperatures. At 00:00 UTC on 15 October, the JTWC assigned the system as 92P, forecasting the possibility of the system developing into a tropical cyclone. Later that day at 21:00 UTC, the FMS upgraded the system to a tropical depression. The following day, the JTWC upgraded the system to a tropical cyclone, designating it 01P. On October 16, the FMS upgraded the system to a tropical cyclone and assigned it the name Wati. The system eventually reached its peak intensity on October 18, with winds of approximately 100km/h (62mph) and a minimum central pressure of 975 hPa (mbar). The following day, the FMS reported that the system transitioned into an extratropical cyclone.

Wati brought gale-force winds and rough seas to Arutanga, battering a 7 million USD wharf project.

=== Severe Tropical Cyclone Xavier ===
- Category 5 severe tropical cyclone (Australian scale)
- Category 4 tropical cyclone (SSHWS)
- Duration: 12 November – 22 November
- Peak intensity: 220 km/h (140 mph) (10-min); 910 hPa (mbar)

On November 12, the FMS began monitoring a disturbance that formed 1,526 km (948 miles) northeast of Samoa. The FMS noted that the disturbance was in a favorable environment with low wind shear and strong radial outflow. On November 15, the JTWC classified it as Tropical Cyclone designating it 04P, as the LLCC became well defined. Later that day, the FMS upgraded the system into a tropical cyclone assigning it the name Xavier. Due to a combination of favorable conditions, the storm intensified rapidly, reaching Category 5 on the Australian tropical cyclone intensity scale and Category 4 on the Saffir–Simpson scale just two days after being named. It became the first storm to reach Category 5 on the Australian scale since Lola in 2023. The system peaked with 10-minute sustained winds of 120 knots (220 km/h) and a central pressure of 910 hPa, as reported by the FMS, therefore Xavier became the most intense tropical cyclone in the South Pacific since Winston in 2016.

On 17 November, the Cook Islands Meteorological Service issued a storm warning for Manihiki and Rakahanga in response to the approaching Severe Tropical Cyclone Xavier. Later that day, the storm was upgraded to a Category 4 storm. By 18 November, Cyclone Xavier had reached the Northern Cook Islands, bringing strong winds of about 220km/h and gusts of up to 315 km/h (195 mph). Emergency Management Cook Islands advised residents to seek shelter. By 19 November, Xavier was downgraded to a Category 4 storm as sustained winds drop to 175 km/h (109 mph), with warnings still remained in place for the Northern Cook Islands. The storm also caused minimal damage to the wharf and coastal areas of Manihiki.

In response, New Zealand deployed two rapid response personnel to assist Cook Islands authorities with humanitarian coordination and emergency operations. By 21 November, Cyclone Xavier had been downgraded to a Category 1 storm. On 21 November, Cook Islands Prime Minister Mark Brown confirmed that the Cook Islands government was dispatching relief supplies to the Northern Cook Islands. In addition, the Royal New Zealand Air Force also sent a C-130 Hercules carrying humanitarian supplies to Rarotonga, where they would then be loaded onto the Te Kukupa II.

== Storm names ==
Within the South Pacific, a tropical depression is judged to have reached tropical cyclone intensity should it reach winds of 65 km/h (40 mph) and it is evident that gales are occurring at least halfway around the centre. Tropical depressions intensifying into a tropical cyclone between the Equator and 26°S and between 160°E–120°W are named by the Fiji Meteorological Service (FMS); should a tropical depression intensify to the south of 26°S between 160°E and 120°W, it will be named in conjunction with the FMS by MetService. Should a tropical cyclone move out of the basin and into the Australian region or vice-versa, it will retain its original name. The names Chip and Denia are expected to be used for the first time this season, after replacing Cliff and Daman respectively, from the 2006–07 and the 2007–08 seasons. The next eight names are listed below:

- Wati
- Xavier
- Yani (unused)
- Zita (unused)
- Arthur (unused)
- Becky (unused)
- Chip (unused)
- Denia (unused)

== Season effects ==
This table lists all the storms that developed in the South Pacific to the east of longitude 160°E during the 2026–27 season. It includes their intensity on the Australian tropical cyclone intensity scale, duration, name, landfalls, deaths, and damages. All data is taken from RSMC Nadi and/or TCWC Wellington, and all of the damage figures are in 2026 or 2027 USD.

Name	Dates	Peak intensity			Areas affected	Damage (USD)	Deaths	Ref(s).
Name	Dates	Category	Wind speed	Pressure	Areas affected	Damage (USD)	Deaths	Ref(s).
Wati	October 14 – 19	Category 2 tropical cyclone	100 km/h (65 mph)	975 hPa (28.79 inHg)	Cook Islands, French Polynesia	>7 million	None	
Xavier	November 12 – 22	Category 5 severe tropical cyclone	220 km/h (140 mph)	910 hPa (26.87 inHg)	Cook Islands	Unknown	None	
Season aggregates
2 systems	14 October 2026 – Season ongoing		220 km/h (140 mph)	910 hPa (26.87 inHg)		>7 million	None	

== See also ==
- Weather of 2026
- List of Southern Hemisphere cyclone seasons
- Tropical cyclones in 2026 and 2027
- Atlantic hurricane seasons: 2026, 2027
- Pacific hurricane seasons: 2026, 2027
- Pacific typhoon seasons: 2026, 2027
- North Indian Ocean cyclone seasons: 2026, 2027
- 2026–27 South-West Indian Ocean cyclone season
- 2026–27 Australian region cyclone season
