= List of Northern Hemisphere tropical cyclone seasons =

The tropical cyclone seasons that occur in the Northern Hemisphere are:

- Atlantic hurricane
  - Current – 2025 Atlantic hurricane season
- Pacific hurricane
  - Current – 2025 Pacific hurricane season
- Pacific typhoon
  - Current – 2025 Pacific typhoon season
- North Indian Ocean tropical cyclone
  - Current – 2025 North Indian Ocean cyclone season
