= Tropical Cyclone Heat Potential =

Non-conventional oceanographic parameters

Tropical Cyclone Heat Potential (TCHP) is one of such non-conventional oceanographic parameters influencing the tropical cyclone intensity. The relationship between Sea Surface Temperature (SST) and cyclone intensity has been long studied in statistical intensity prediction schemes such as the National Hurricane Center Statistical Hurricane Intensity Prediction Scheme (SHIPS) and Statistical Typhoon Intensity Prediction Scheme (STIPS). STIPS is run at the Naval Research Laboratory in Monterey, California, and is provided to Joint Typhoon Warning Centre (JTWC) to make cyclone intensity forecasts in the western North Pacific, South Pacific, and Indian Oceans. In most of the cyclone models, SST is the only oceanographic parameter representing heat exchange. However, cyclones have long been known to interact with the deeper layers of ocean rather than sea surface alone. Using a coupled ocean atmospheric model, Mao et al., concluded that the rate of intensification and final intensity of cyclone were sensitive to the initial spatial distribution of the mixed layer rather than to SST alone. Similarly, Namias and Canyan observed patterns of lower atmospheric anomalies being more consistent with the upper ocean thermal structure variability than SST.
