= Tropical cyclone =

Rapidly rotating storm system

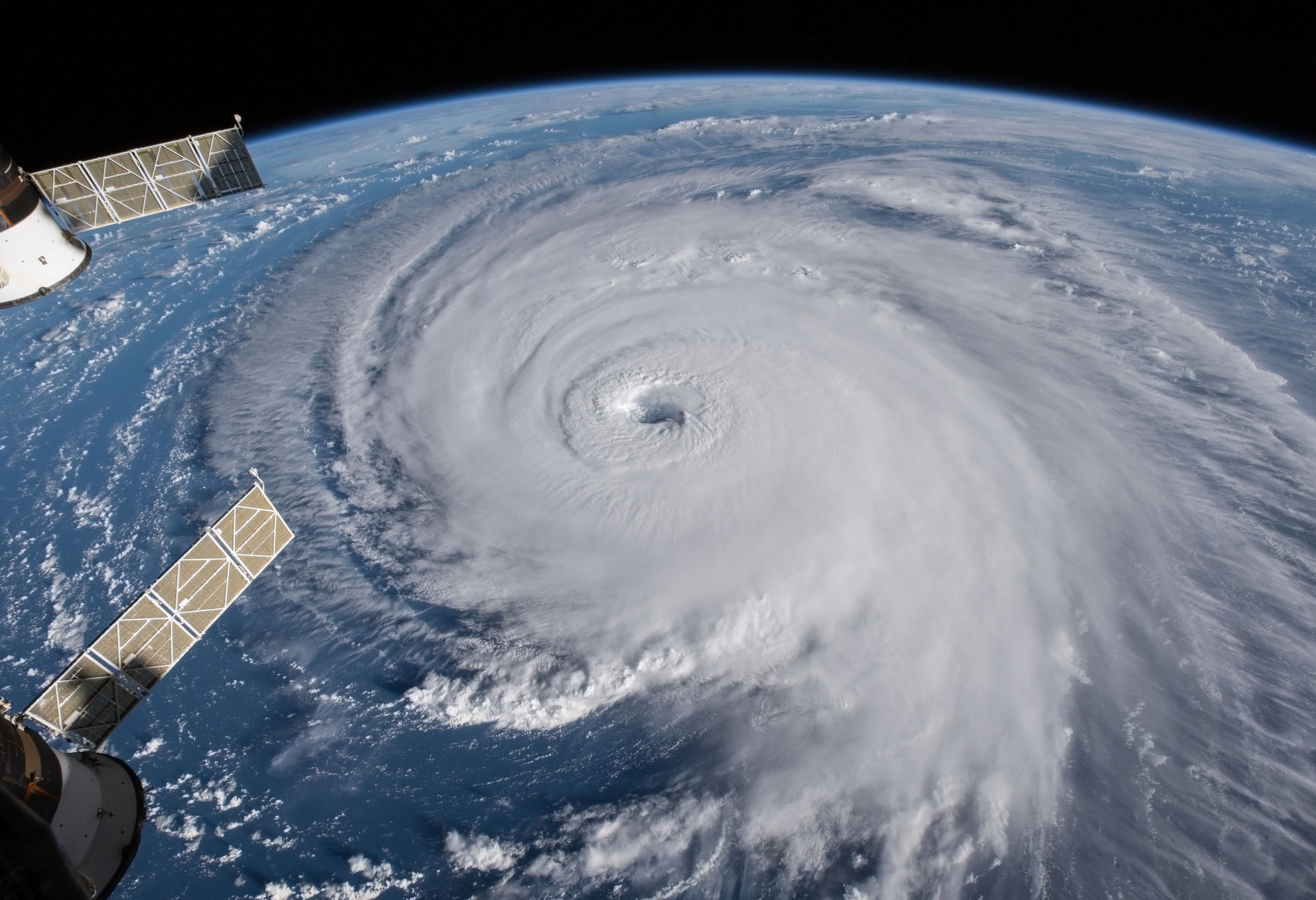
Hurricane Florence viewed from the International Space Station in 2018. The eye, eyewall, and surrounding rainbands are characteristics of tropical cyclones.

A tropical cyclone is a rapidly rotating storm system with a low-pressure area, a closed low-level atmospheric circulation, strong winds, and a spiral arrangement of thunderstorms that produce heavy rain and squalls. Depending on its location and strength, a tropical cyclone is called a hurricane (/ˈhʌrɪkən, -keɪn/), typhoon (/taɪˈfuːn/), tropical storm, cyclonic storm, tropical depression, or simply cyclone. A hurricane is a strong tropical cyclone that occurs in the Atlantic Ocean or northeastern Pacific Ocean. A typhoon is the same thing which occurs in the northwestern Pacific Ocean. In the Indian Ocean and South Pacific, comparable storms are referred to as "tropical cyclones". In modern times, on average around 80 to 90 named tropical cyclones form each year around the world, over half of which develop hurricane-force winds of 65 kn (120 km/h; 75 mph) or more.

Tropical cyclones typically form over large bodies of relatively warm water. They derive their energy through the evaporation of water from the ocean surface, which ultimately condenses into clouds and rain when moist air rises and cools to saturation. This energy source differs from that of mid-latitude cyclonic storms, such as nor'easters and European windstorms, which are powered primarily by horizontal temperature contrasts. Tropical cyclones are typically between 100 and 2,000 km (62 and 1,243 mi) in diameter. The strong rotating winds of a tropical cyclone are a result of the conservation of angular momentum imparted by the Earth's rotation as air flows inwards toward the axis of rotation. As a result, cyclones rarely form within 5° of the equator. South Atlantic tropical cyclones are very rare due to consistently strong wind shear and a weak Intertropical Convergence Zone. In contrast, the African easterly jet and areas of atmospheric instability give rise to cyclones in the Atlantic Ocean and Caribbean Sea.

Heat energy from the ocean acts as the accelerator for tropical cyclones. This causes inland regions to suffer far less damage from cyclones than coastal regions, although the impacts of flooding are felt across the board. Coastal damage may be caused by strong winds and rain, high waves, storm surges, and tornadoes. Climate change affects tropical cyclones in several ways. Scientists have found that climate change can exacerbate the impact of tropical cyclones by increasing their duration, occurrence, and intensity due to the warming of ocean waters and intensification of the water cycle. Tropical cyclones draw in air from a large area and concentrate the water content of that air into precipitation over a much smaller area. This replenishing of moisture-bearing air after rain may cause multi-hour or multi-day extremely heavy rain up to 40 km (25 mi) from the coastline, far beyond the amount of water that the local atmosphere holds at any one time. This in turn can lead to river flooding, overland flooding, and a general overwhelming of local water control structures across a large area.

== Definition and terminology ==
A tropical cyclone is the generic term for a warm-cored, non-frontal synoptic-scale low-pressure system over tropical or subtropical waters around the world. The systems generally have a well-defined center which is surrounded by deep atmospheric convection and a closed wind circulation at the surface. A tropical cyclone is generally deemed to have formed once mean surface winds in excess of 35 kn (65 km/h; 40 mph) are observed. It is assumed at this stage that a tropical cyclone has become self-sustaining and can continue to intensify without any help from its environment.

Depending on its location and strength, a tropical cyclone is referred to by different names, including hurricane, typhoon, tropical storm, cyclonic storm, tropical depression, or simply cyclone. A hurricane is a strong tropical cyclone that occurs in the Atlantic Ocean or northeastern Pacific Ocean, and a typhoon occurs in the northwestern Pacific Ocean. In the Indian Ocean and South Pacific, comparable storms are referred to as "tropical cyclones", and such storms in the Indian Ocean can also be called "severe cyclonic storms".

Tropical refers to the geographical origin of these systems, which form almost exclusively over tropical seas. Cyclone refers to their winds moving in a circle, whirling round their central clear eye, with their surface winds blowing counterclockwise in the Northern Hemisphere and clockwise in the Southern Hemisphere. The opposite direction of circulation is due to the Coriolis effect.

== Formation ==
A diagram of a tropical cyclone in the Northern Hemisphere

Tropical cyclones tend to develop during the summer, but have been noted in nearly every month in most tropical cyclone basins. Tropical cyclones on either side of the Equator generally have their origins in the Intertropical Convergence Zone (ITCZ), where winds blow from either the northeast or southeast. Within this broad area of low-pressure, air is heated over the warm tropical ocean and rises in discrete parcels, which causes towering thunderstorms to form. These showers dissipate quite quickly; however, they can group together into large clusters of thunderstorms. This creates a flow of warm, moist, rapidly rising air, which starts to rotate cyclonically as it interacts with the rotation of the earth.

Several factors are required for these thunderstorms to develop further, including sea surface temperatures of around 27 °C (81 °F) and low vertical wind shear surrounding the system, atmospheric instability, high humidity in the lower to middle levels of the troposphere, enough Coriolis force to develop a low-pressure center, and a pre-existing low-level focus or disturbance. There is a limit on tropical cyclone intensity which is strongly related to the water temperatures along its path and upper-level divergence. An average of 86 tropical cyclones of tropical storm intensity form annually worldwide. Of those cyclones, 47 reach strengths higher than 119 km/h (74 mph), and 20 become intense tropical cyclones, of at least Category 3 intensity on the Saffir–Simpson scale.

Climate oscillations such as El Niño–Southern Oscillation (ENSO) and the Madden–Julian oscillation modulate the timing and frequency of tropical cyclone development. Rossby waves can aid in the formation of a new tropical cyclone by disseminating the energy of an existing, mature storm. Kelvin waves can contribute to tropical cyclone formation by regulating the development of the westerlies. Cyclone formation is usually reduced 3 days prior to the wave's crest and increased during the 3 days after.

=== Formation regions and warning centers ===
Tropical cyclone basins and official warning centers
| Basin | Warning center | Area of responsibility | Notes |
|---|---|---|---|
Northern Hemisphere
| North Atlantic | United States National Hurricane Center (Miami) | Equator northward, African Coast – 140°W | |
| Eastern Pacific | United States Central Pacific Hurricane Center (Honolulu) | Equator northward, 140–180°W | |
| Western Pacific | Japan Meteorological Agency | Equator – 60°N, 180–100°E | |
| North Indian Ocean | India Meteorological Department | Equator northwards, 100–40°E | |
Southern Hemisphere
| South-West Indian Ocean | Météo-France Reunion | Equator – 40°S, African Coast – 90°E | |
| Australian region | Indonesian Meteorology, Climatology, and Geophysical Agency (BMKG) | Equator – 10°S, 90–141°E | |
| Australian region | Papua New Guinea National Weather Service | Equator – 10°S, 141–160°E | |
| Australian region | Australian Bureau of Meteorology | 10–40°S, 90–160°E | |
| Southern Pacific | Fiji Meteorological Service | Equator – 25°S, 160°E – 120°W | |
| Southern Pacific | Meteorological Service of New Zealand | 25–40°S, 160°E – 120°W | |

The majority of tropical cyclones each year form in one of seven tropical cyclone basins, which are monitored by a variety of meteorological services and warning centers. Ten of these warning centers worldwide are designated as either a Regional Specialized Meteorological Centre or a Tropical Cyclone Warning Centre by the World Meteorological Organization's (WMO) tropical cyclone programme. These warning centers issue advisories which provide basic information and cover a systems present, forecast position, movement and intensity, in their designated areas of responsibility.

Meteorological services around the world are generally responsible for issuing warnings for their own country. There are exceptions, as the United States National Hurricane Center and Fiji Meteorological Service issue alerts, watches and warnings for various island nations in their areas of responsibility. The United States Joint Typhoon Warning Center and Fleet Weather Center also publicly issue warnings about tropical cyclones on behalf of the United States Government. The Brazilian Navy Hydrographic Center names South Atlantic tropical cyclones, however the South Atlantic is not a major basin, and not an official basin according to the WMO.

== Interactions with climate ==
Each year on average, around 80 to 90 named tropical cyclones form around the world, of which over half develop hurricane-force winds of 65 kn (120 km/h; 75 mph) or more. Worldwide, tropical cyclone activity peaks in late summer, when the difference between temperatures aloft and sea surface temperatures is the greatest. However, each particular basin has its own seasonal patterns. On a worldwide scale, May is the least active month, while September is the most active month. November is the only month in which all the tropical cyclone basins are in season.

In the Northern Atlantic Ocean, a distinct cyclone season occurs from June 1 to November 30, sharply peaking from late August through September. The statistical peak of the Atlantic hurricane season is September 10.

The Northeast Pacific Ocean has a broader period of activity, but in a similar time frame to the Atlantic. The Northwest Pacific sees tropical cyclones year-round, with a minimum in February and March and a peak in early September. In the North Indian basin, storms are most common from April to December, with peaks in May and November. In the Southern Hemisphere, the tropical cyclone year begins on July 1 and runs all year-round encompassing the tropical cyclone seasons, which run from November 1 until the end of April, with peaks in mid-February to early March.

Of various modes of variability in the climate system, El Niño–Southern Oscillation has the largest effect on tropical cyclone activity. Most tropical cyclones form on the side of the subtropical ridge closer to the equator, then move poleward past the ridge axis before recurving into the main belt of the Westerlies. When the subtropical ridge position shifts due to El Niño, so will the preferred tropical cyclone tracks. Areas west of Japan and Korea tend to experience much fewer September–November tropical cyclone impacts during El Niño and neutral years.

During La Niña years, the formation of tropical cyclones, along with the subtropical ridge position, shifts westward across the western Pacific Ocean, which increases the landfall threat to China and much greater intensity in the Philippines. The Atlantic Ocean experiences depressed activity due to increased vertical wind shear across the region during El Niño years. Tropical cyclones are further influenced by the Atlantic Meridional Mode, the Quasi-biennial oscillation and the Madden–Julian oscillation.

Season lengths and averages
| Basin | Season start | Season end | Tropical cyclones | Refs |
|---|---|---|---|---|
| North Atlantic | June 1 | November 30 | 14.4 | |
| Eastern Pacific | May 15 | November 30 | 16.6 | |
| Western Pacific | January 1 | December 31 | 26.0 | |
| North Indian | January 1 | December 31 | 12 | |
| South-West Indian | July 1 | June 30 | 9.3 | |
| Australian region | November 1 | April 30 | 11.0 | |
| Southern Pacific | November 1 | April 30 | 7.1 | |
| Total: | | | 96.4 | |

=== Influence of climate change ===
The 20-year average of the number of annual Category 4 and 5 hurricanes in the Atlantic region has approximately doubled since the year 2000.

Worldwide, the average annual number of Category 5 storms has doubled since 1982.

Climate change's increase of water temperatures intensified peak wind speeds in all eleven 2024 Atlantic hurricanes.

Perceptions in the United States differ along political lines, on whether climate change was a "major factor" contributing to various extreme weather events experienced by respondents in 2023. "Severe storms" includes hurricanes.

The IPCC Sixth Assessment Report summarize the latest scientific findings about the impact of climate change on tropical cyclones. According to the report, we have now better understanding about the impact of climate change on tropical storm than before. Major tropical storms likely became more frequent in the last 40 years. We can say with high confidence that climate change increased rainfall during tropical cyclones. We can say with high confidence that a 1.5 degree warming lead to "increased proportion of and peak wind speeds of intense tropical cyclones". We can say with medium confidence that regional impacts of further warming include more intense tropical cyclones and/or extratropical storms.

Climate change can affect tropical cyclones in a variety of ways: an intensification of rainfall and wind speed, a decrease in overall frequency, an increase in the frequency of very intense storms and a poleward extension of where the cyclones reach maximum intensity are among the possible consequences of human-induced climate change. Tropical cyclones use warm, moist air as their fuel. As climate change is warming ocean temperatures, there is potentially more of this fuel available.

Between 1979 and 2017, there was a global increase in the proportion of tropical cyclones of Category 3 and higher on the Saffir–Simpson scale. The trend was most clear in the North Atlantic and in the Southern Indian Ocean. In the North Pacific, tropical cyclones have been moving poleward into colder waters and there was no increase in intensity over this period. With 2 °C (3.6 °F) warming, a greater percentage (+13%) of tropical cyclones are expected to reach Category 4 and 5 strength. A 2019 study indicates that climate change has been driving the observed trend of rapid intensification of tropical cyclones in the Atlantic basin. Rapidly intensifying cyclones are hard to forecast and therefore pose additional risk to coastal communities.

Warmer air can hold more water vapor: the theoretical maximum water vapor content is given by the Clausius–Clapeyron relation, which yields ≈7% increase in water vapor in the atmosphere per 1 °C (1.8 °F) warming. All models that were assessed in a 2019 review paper show a future increase of rainfall rates. Additional sea level rise will increase storm surge levels. It is plausible that extreme wind waves see an increase as a consequence of changes in tropical cyclones, further exacerbating storm surge dangers to coastal communities. The compounding effects from floods, storm surge, and terrestrial flooding (rivers) are projected to increase due to global warming.

There is currently no consensus on how climate change will affect the overall frequency of tropical cyclones. A majority of climate models show a decreased frequency in future projections. For instance, a 2020 paper comparing nine high-resolution climate models found robust decreases in frequency in the Southern Indian Ocean and the Southern Hemisphere more generally, while finding mixed signals for Northern Hemisphere tropical cyclones. Observations have shown little change in the overall frequency of tropical cyclones worldwide, with increased frequency in the North Atlantic and central Pacific, and significant decreases in the southern Indian Ocean and western North Pacific.

There has been a poleward expansion of the latitude at which the maximum intensity of tropical cyclones occurs, which may be associated with climate change. In the North Pacific, there may also have been an eastward expansion. Between 1949 and 2016, there was a slowdown in tropical cyclone translation speeds. (Tropical cyclone translation speed is the speed at which a storm moves across the ocean, measured at consecutive locations at a selected time interval, such as every three hours or every six hours.) It is unclear still to what extent this can be attributed to climate change: climate models do not all show this feature.

A 2021 study review article concluded that the geographic range of tropical cyclones will probably expand poleward in response to climate warming of the Hadley circulation.

When hurricane winds speed rise by 5%, its destructive power rises by about 50%. Therefore, as climate change increased the wind speed of Hurricane Helene by 11%, it increased the destruction from it by more than twice. According to World Weather Attribution the influence of climate change on the rainfall of some latest hurricanes can be described as follows:

Impact of climate change on the rainfall during some recent hurricanes according to World Weather Attribution.
| The name of the hurricane | How much climate change increased rainfall |
|---|---|
| Hurricane Katrina | 4% |
| Hurricane Irma | 6% |
| Hurricane Maria | 9% |
| Hurricane Florence | 5% |
| Hurricane Dorian | 5–18% |
| Hurricane Ian | 18% |
| Hurricane Harvey | 7–38% |
| Hurricane Helene | 10% |

== Intensity ==
Tropical cyclone intensity is based on wind speeds and pressure. Relationships between winds and pressure are often used in determining the intensity of a storm. Tropical cyclone scales, such as the Saffir-Simpson hurricane wind scale and Australia's scale (Bureau of Meteorology), only use wind speed for determining the category of a storm. The most intense storm on record is Typhoon Tip in the northwestern Pacific Ocean in 1979, which reached a minimum pressure of 870 hPa (25.69 inHg) and maximum sustained wind speeds of 165 kn (85 m/s; 305 km/h; 190 mph). The highest maximum sustained wind speed ever recorded was 185 kn (95 m/s; 345 km/h; 215 mph) in Hurricane Patricia in 2015—the most intense cyclone ever recorded in the Western Hemisphere.

=== Factors ===
Warm sea surface temperatures are required for tropical cyclones to form and strengthen. The commonly accepted minimum temperature range for this to occur is 26–27 °C (79–81 °F), however, multiple studies have proposed a lower minimum of 25.5 °C (77.9 °F). Higher sea surface temperatures result in faster intensification rates and sometimes even rapid intensification. High ocean heat content, also known as Tropical Cyclone Heat Potential, allows storms to achieve a higher intensity. Most tropical cyclones that experience rapid intensification are traversing regions of high ocean heat content rather than lower values. High ocean heat content values can help to offset the oceanic cooling caused by the passage of a tropical cyclone, limiting the effect this cooling has on the storm. Faster-moving systems are able to intensify to higher intensities with lower ocean heat content values. Slower-moving systems require higher values of ocean heat content to achieve the same intensity.

The passage of a tropical cyclone over the ocean causes the upper layers of the ocean to cool substantially, a process known as upwelling, which can negatively influence subsequent cyclone development. This cooling is primarily caused by wind-driven mixing of cold water from deeper in the ocean with the warm surface waters. This effect results in a negative feedback process that can inhibit further development or lead to weakening. Additional cooling may come in the form of cold water from falling raindrops (this is because the atmosphere is cooler at higher altitudes). Cloud cover may also play a role in cooling the ocean, by shielding the ocean surface from direct sunlight before and slightly after the storm passage. All these effects can combine to produce a dramatic drop in sea surface temperature over a large area in just a few days. Conversely, the mixing of the sea can result in heat being inserted in deeper waters, with potential effects on global climate.

Vertical wind shear decreases tropical cyclone predicability, with storms exhibiting wide range of responses in the presence of shear. Wind shear often negatively affects tropical cyclone intensification by displacing moisture and heat from a system's center. Low levels of vertical wind shear are most optimal for strengthening, while stronger wind shear induces weakening. Dry air entraining into a tropical cyclone's core has a negative effect on its development and intensity by diminishing atmospheric convection and introducing asymmetries in the storm's structure. Symmetric, strong outflow leads to a faster rate of intensification than observed in other systems by mitigating local wind shear. Weakening outflow is associated with the weakening of rainbands within a tropical cyclone. Tropical cyclones may still intensify, even rapidly, in the presence of moderate or strong wind shear depending on the evolution and structure of the storm's convection.

The size of tropical cyclones plays a role in how quickly they intensify. Smaller tropical cyclones are more prone to rapid intensification than larger ones. The Fujiwhara effect, which involves interaction between two tropical cyclones, can weaken and ultimately result in the dissipation of the weaker of two tropical cyclones by reducing the organization of the system's convection and imparting horizontal wind shear. Tropical cyclones typically weaken while situated over a landmass because conditions are often unfavorable as a result of the lack of oceanic forcing. The Brown ocean effect can allow a tropical cyclone to maintain or increase its intensity following landfall, in cases where there has been copious rainfall, through the release of latent heat from the saturated soil. Orographic lift can cause a significant increase in the intensity of the convection of a tropical cyclone when its eye moves over a mountain, breaking the capped boundary layer that had been restraining it. Jet streams can both enhance and inhibit tropical cyclone intensity by influencing the storm's outflow as well as vertical wind shear.

=== Rapid intensification ===
On occasion, tropical cyclones may undergo a process known as rapid intensification, a period in which the maximum sustained winds of a tropical cyclone increase by 30 kn (56 km/h; 35 mph) or more within 24 hours. Similarly, rapid deepening in tropical cyclones is defined as a minimum sea surface pressure decrease of 1.75 hPa (0.052 inHg) per hour or 42 hPa (1.2 inHg) within a 24-hour period; explosive deepening occurs when the surface pressure decreases by 2.5 hPa (0.074 inHg) per hour for at least 12 hours or 5 hPa (0.15 inHg) per hour for at least 6 hours.

For rapid intensification to occur, several conditions must be in place. Water temperatures must be extremely high, near or above 30 °C (86 °F), and water of this temperature must be sufficiently deep such that waves do not upwell cooler waters to the surface. On the other hand, Tropical Cyclone Heat Potential is one of such non-conventional subsurface oceanographic parameters influencing the cyclone intensity.

Wind shear must be low. When wind shear is high, the convection and circulation in the cyclone will be disrupted. Usually, an anticyclone in the upper layers of the troposphere above the storm must be present as well—for extremely low surface pressures to develop, air must be rising very rapidly in the eyewall of the storm, and an upper-level anticyclone helps channel this air away from the cyclone efficiently. However, some cyclones such as Hurricane Epsilon in 2020 have rapidly intensified despite relatively unfavorable conditions.

=== Dissipation ===
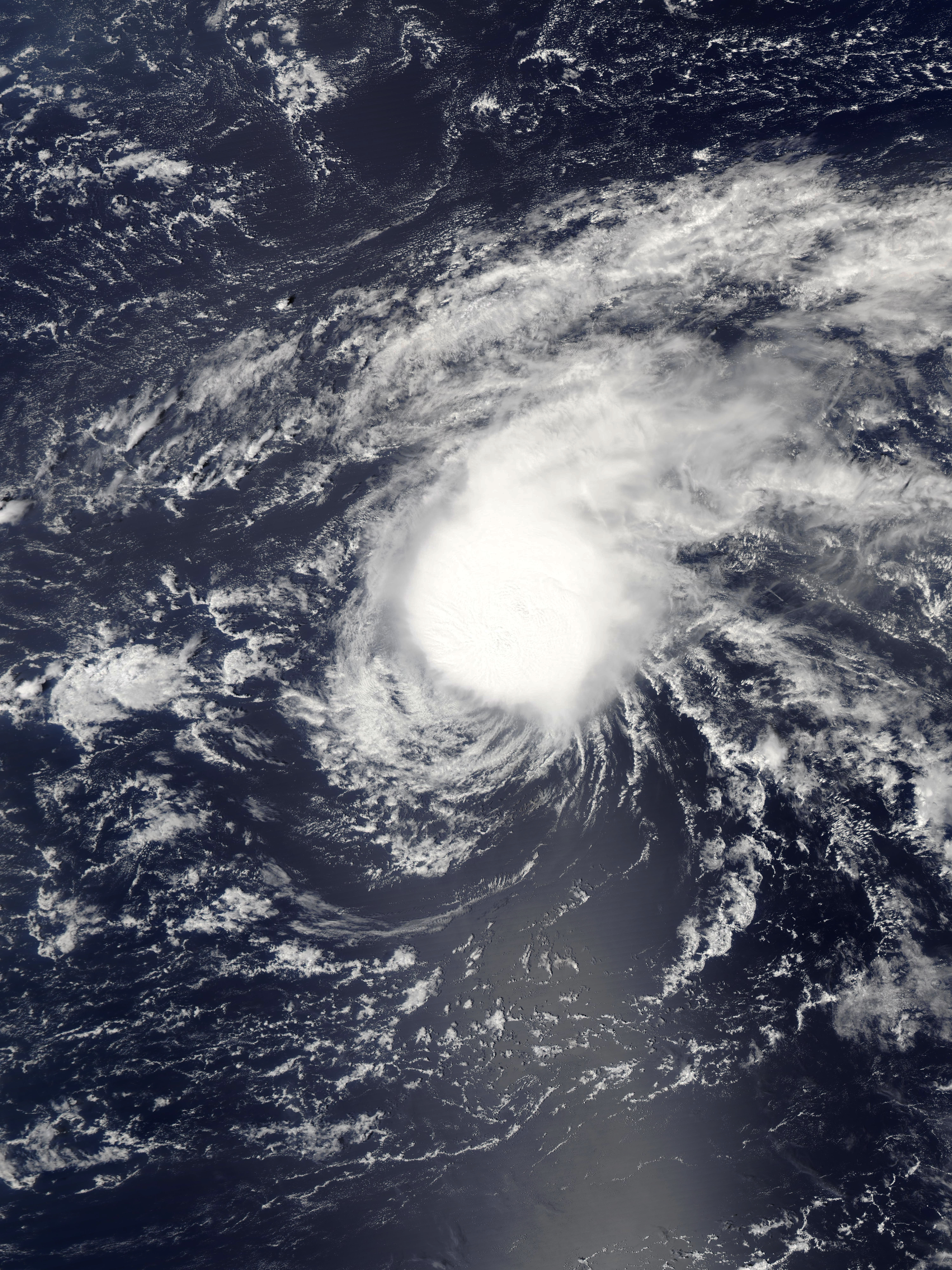
Hurricane Paulette, in 2020, is an example of a sheared tropical cyclone, with deep convection slightly removed from the center of the system.

There are a number of ways a tropical cyclone can weaken, dissipate, or lose its tropical characteristics. These include making landfall, moving over cooler water, encountering dry air, or interacting with other weather systems; however, once a system has dissipated or lost its tropical characteristics, its remnants could regenerate a tropical cyclone if environmental conditions become favorable.

A tropical cyclone can dissipate when it moves over waters significantly cooler than 26.5 °C (79.7 °F). This will deprive the storm of such tropical characteristics as a warm core with thunderstorms near the center, so that it becomes a remnant low-pressure area. Remnant systems may persist for several days before losing their identity. This dissipation mechanism is most common in the eastern North Pacific. Weakening or dissipation can also occur if a storm experiences vertical wind shear which causes the convection and heat engine to move away from the center. This normally ceases the development of a tropical cyclone. In addition, its interaction with the main belt of the Westerlies, by means of merging with a nearby frontal zone, can cause tropical cyclones to evolve into extratropical cyclones. This transition can take 1–3 days.

Should a tropical cyclone make landfall or pass over an island, its circulation could start to break down, especially if it encounters mountainous terrain. When a system makes landfall on a large landmass, it is cut off from its supply of warm moist maritime air and starts to draw in dry continental air. This, combined with the increased friction over land areas, leads to the weakening and dissipation of the tropical cyclone. Over a mountainous terrain, a system can quickly weaken. Over flat areas, it may endure for two to three days before circulation breaks down and dissipates.

Over the years, there have been a number of techniques considered to try to artificially modify tropical cyclones. These techniques have included using nuclear weapons, cooling the ocean with icebergs, blowing the storm away from land with giant fans, and seeding selected storms with dry ice or silver iodide. These techniques, however, fail to appreciate the duration, intensity, power or size of tropical cyclones.

=== Assessment methods ===
A variety of methods or techniques, including surface, satellite, and aerial, are used to assess the intensity of a tropical cyclone. Reconnaissance aircraft fly around and through tropical cyclones, outfitted with specialized instruments, to collect information that can be used to ascertain the winds and pressure of a system. Tropical cyclones possess winds of different speeds at different heights. Winds recorded at flight level can be converted to find the wind speeds at the surface. Surface observations, such as ship reports, land stations, mesonets, coastal stations, and buoys, can provide information on a tropical cyclone's intensity or the direction it is traveling.

Wind-pressure relationships (WPRs) are used as a way to determine the pressure of a storm based on its wind speed. Several different methods and equations have been proposed to calculate WPRs. Tropical cyclones agencies each use their own, fixed WPR, which can result in inaccuracies between agencies that are issuing estimates on the same system. The ASCAT is a scatterometer used by the MetOp satellites to map the wind field vectors of tropical cyclones. The SMAP uses an L-band radiometer channel to determine the wind speeds of tropical cyclones at the ocean surface, and has been shown to be reliable at higher intensities and under heavy rainfall conditions, unlike scatterometer-based and other radiometer-based instruments.

The Dvorak technique plays a large role in both the classification of a tropical cyclone and the determination of its intensity. Used in warning centers, the method was developed by Vernon Dvorak in the 1970s, and uses both visible and infrared satellite imagery in the assessment of tropical cyclone intensity. The Dvorak technique uses a scale of "T-numbers", scaling in increments of 0.5 from T1.0 to T8.0. Each T-number has an intensity assigned to it, with larger T-numbers indicating a stronger system. Tropical cyclones are assessed by forecasters according to an array of patterns, including curved banding features, shear, central dense overcast, and eye, to determine the T-number and thus assess the intensity of the storm.

The Cooperative Institute for Meteorological Satellite Studies works to develop and improve automated satellite methods, such as the Advanced Dvorak Technique (ADT) and SATCON. The ADT, used by a large number of forecasting centers, uses infrared geostationary satellite imagery and an algorithm based upon the Dvorak technique to assess the intensity of tropical cyclones. The ADT has a number of differences from the conventional Dvorak technique, including changes to intensity constraint rules and the usage of microwave imagery to base a system's intensity upon its internal structure, which prevents the intensity from leveling off before an eye emerges in infrared imagery. The SATCON weights estimates from various satellite-based systems and microwave sounders, accounting for the strengths and flaws in each individual estimate, to produce a consensus estimate of a tropical cyclone's intensity which can be more reliable than the Dvorak technique at times.

=== Intensity metrics ===
Multiple intensity metrics are used, including accumulated cyclone energy (ACE), the Hurricane Surge Index, the Hurricane Severity Index, the Power Dissipation Index (PDI), and integrated kinetic energy (IKE). ACE is a metric of the total energy a system has exerted over its lifespan. ACE is calculated by summing the squares of a cyclone's sustained wind speed, every six hours as long as the system is at or above tropical storm intensity and either tropical or subtropical. The calculation of the PDI is similar in nature to ACE, with the major difference being that wind speeds are cubed rather than squared.

The Hurricane Surge Index is a metric of the potential damage a storm may inflict via storm surge. It is calculated by squaring the dividend of the storm's wind speed and a climatological value (33 m/s or 74 mph), and then multiplying that quantity by the dividend of the radius of hurricane-force winds and its climatological value (96.6 km or 60.0 mi). This can be represented in equation form as:

$$\left(\frac{v}{33\ \mathrm{m/s}}\right)^2\times\left(\frac{r}{96.6\ \mathrm{km}}\right)\,$$

where $v$ is the storm's wind speed and $r$ is the radius of hurricane-force winds. The Hurricane Severity Index is a scale that can assign up to 50 points to a system; up to 25 points come from intensity, while the other 25 come from the size of the storm's wind field. The IKE model measures the destructive capability of a tropical cyclone via winds, waves, and surge. It is calculated as:

$$\int_{Vol} \frac{1}{2}pu^2d_{v}\,$$

where $p$ is the density of air, $u$ is a sustained surface wind speed value, and $d_v$ is the volume element.

== Classification and naming ==
Terminology for tropical cyclones on a world map

=== Classification ===
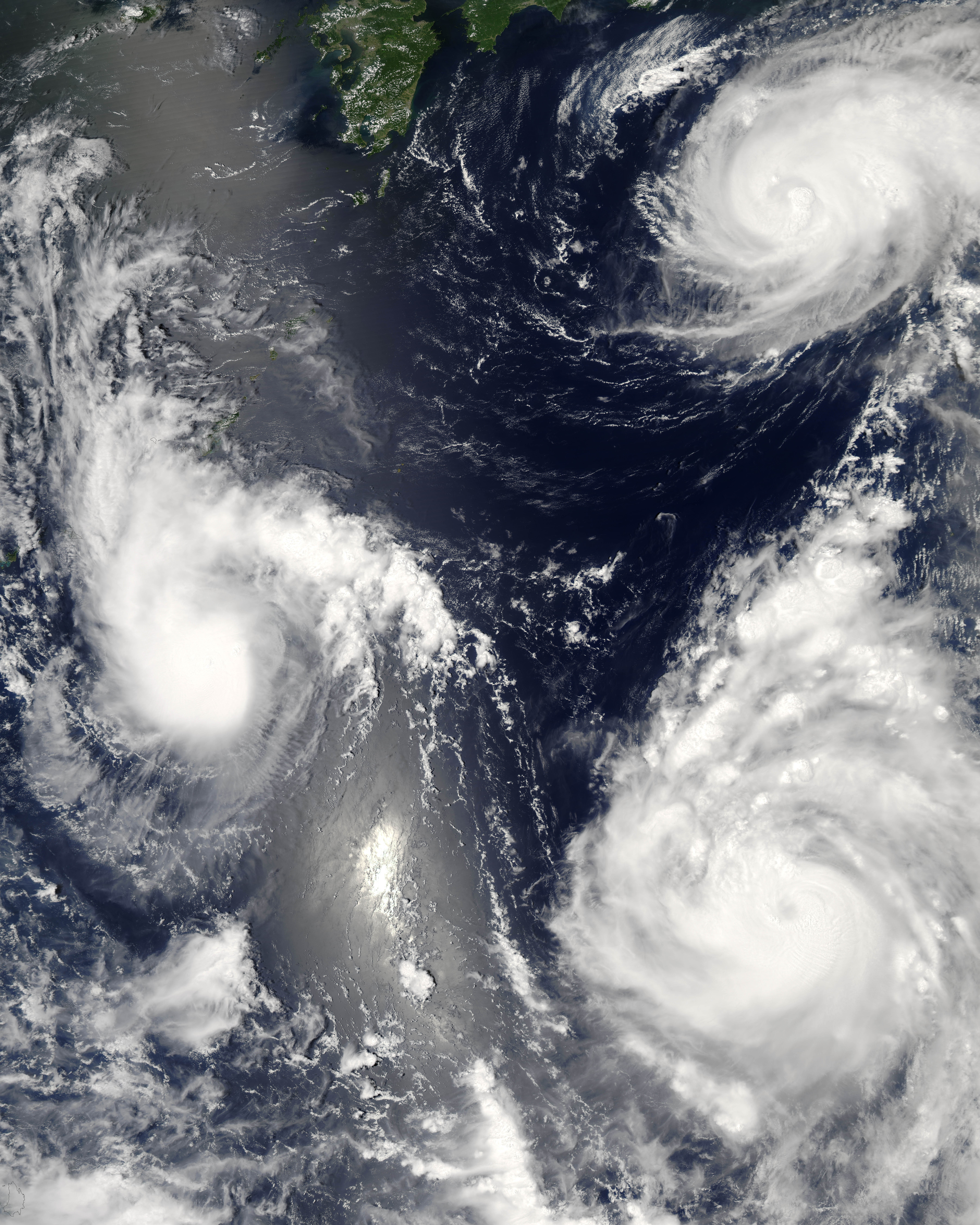
Three tropical cyclones of the 2006 Pacific typhoon season at different stages of development. The weakest (left) demonstrates only the most basic circular shape. A stronger storm (top right) demonstrates spiral banding and increased centralization, while the strongest (lower right) has developed an eye.

Around the world, tropical cyclones are classified in different ways, based on the location (tropical cyclone basins), the structure of the system and its intensity. For example, within the Northern Atlantic and Eastern Pacific basins, a tropical cyclone with wind speeds of over 65 kn (120 km/h; 75 mph) is called a hurricane, while it is called a typhoon or a severe cyclonic storm within the Western Pacific or North Indian oceans. When a hurricane passes west across the International Dateline in the Northern Hemisphere, it becomes known as a typhoon. This happened in 2014 for Hurricane Genevieve, which became Typhoon Genevieve.

Within the Southern Hemisphere, it is either called a hurricane, tropical cyclone or a severe tropical cyclone, depending on if it is located within the South Atlantic, South-West Indian Ocean, Australian region or the South Pacific Ocean. The descriptors for tropical cyclones with wind speeds below 65 kn (120 km/h; 75 mph) vary by tropical cyclone basin and may be further subdivided into categories such as "tropical storm", "cyclonic storm", "tropical depression", or "deep depression".

=== Naming ===
The practice of using given names to identify tropical cyclones dates back to the late 1800s and early 1900s and gradually superseded the existing system—simply naming cyclones based on what they hit. The system currently used provides positive identification of severe weather systems in a brief form, that is readily understood and recognized by the public. The credit for the first usage of personal names for weather systems is generally given to the Queensland Government Meteorologist Clement Wragge who named systems between 1887 and 1907. This system of naming weather systems fell into disuse for several years after Wragge retired, until it was revived in the latter part of World War II for the Western Pacific. Formal naming schemes have subsequently been introduced for the North and South Atlantic, Eastern, Central, Western and Southern Pacific basins as well as the Australian region and Indian Ocean.

At present, tropical cyclones are officially named by one of twelve meteorological services and retain their names throughout their lifetimes to provide ease of communication between forecasters and the general public regarding forecasts, watches, and warnings. Since the systems can last a week or longer, and more than one can be occurring in the same basin at the same time, the names are thought to reduce the confusion about what storm is being described. Names are assigned in order from predetermined lists with one, three, or ten-minute sustained wind speeds of more than 65 km/h (40 mph) depending on which basin it originates.

Standards vary from basin to basin. Some tropical depressions are named in the Western Pacific. Tropical cyclones have to have a significant amount of gale-force winds occurring around the center before they are named within the Southern Hemisphere. The names of significant tropical cyclones in the North Atlantic Ocean, Pacific Ocean, and Australian region are retired from the naming lists and replaced with another name. Tropical cyclones that develop around the world are assigned an identification code consisting of a two-digit number and suffix letter by the warning centers that monitor them.

=== Related cyclone types ===
In addition to tropical cyclones, there are two other classes of cyclones within the spectrum of cyclone types. These kinds of cyclones, known as extratropical cyclones and subtropical cyclones, can be stages a tropical cyclone passes through during its formation or dissipation. An extratropical cyclone is a storm that derives energy from horizontal temperature differences, which are typical in higher latitudes. A tropical cyclone can become extratropical as it moves toward higher latitudes if its energy source changes from heat released by condensation to differences in temperature between air masses. Although not as frequently, an extratropical cyclone can transform into a subtropical storm, and from there into a tropical cyclone. From space, extratropical storms have a characteristic "comma-shaped" cloud pattern. Extratropical cyclones can also be dangerous when their low-pressure centers cause powerful winds and high seas.

A subtropical cyclone is a weather system that has some characteristics of a tropical cyclone and some characteristics of an extratropical cyclone. They can form in a wide band of latitudes, from the equator to 50°. Although subtropical storms rarely have hurricane-force winds, they may become tropical in nature as their cores warm.

== Structure ==
=== Eye and center ===
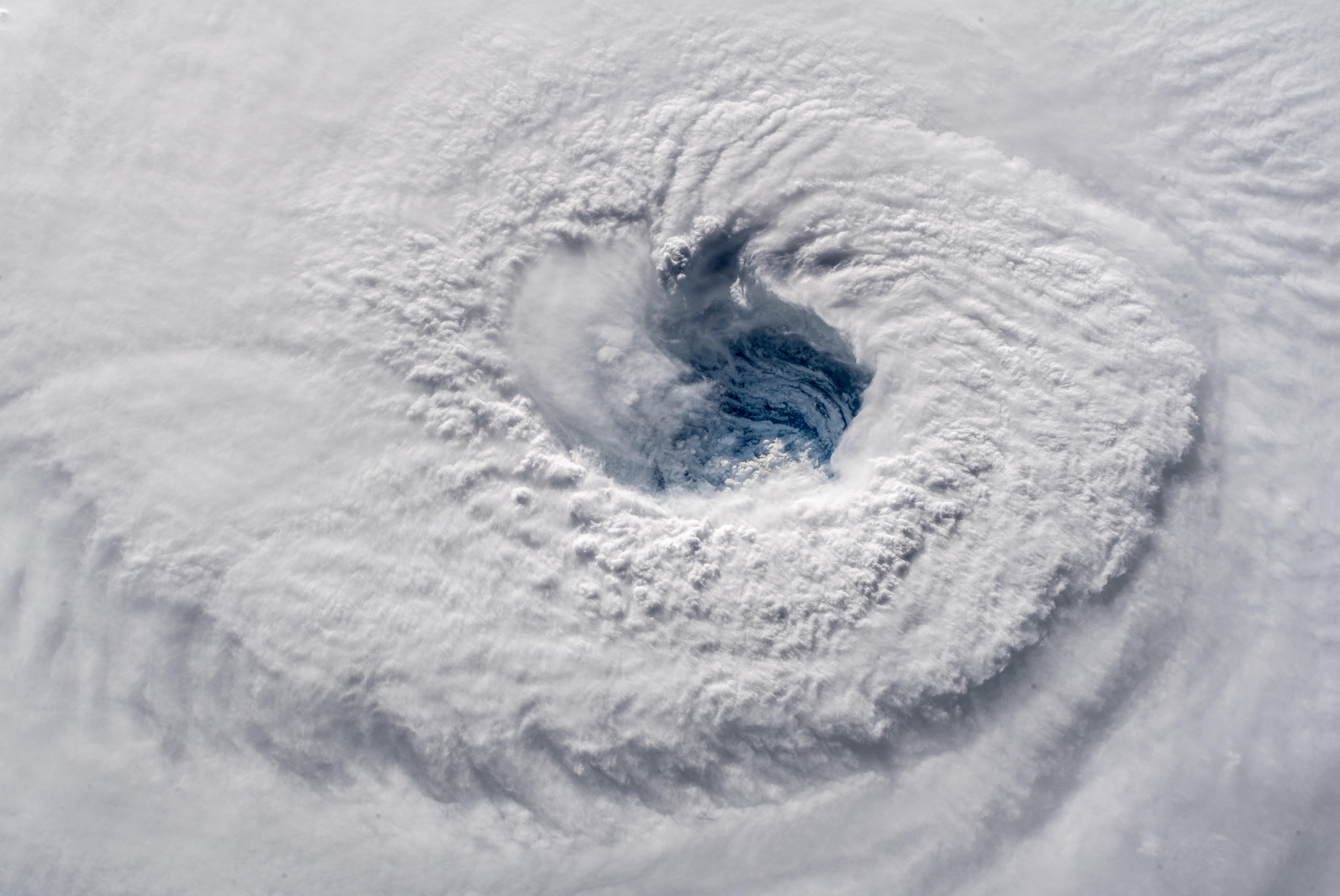
The eye and surrounding clouds of Hurricane Florence seen from the International Space Station

At the center of a mature tropical cyclone, air sinks rather than rises. For a sufficiently strong storm, air may sink over a layer deep enough to suppress cloud formation, thereby creating a clear "eye". Weather in the eye is normally calm and free of convective clouds, although the sea may be extremely violent. The eye is normally circular and is typically 30–65 km (19–40 mi) in diameter, though eyes as small as 3 km (1.9 mi) and as large as 370 km (230 mi) have been observed.

The cloudy outer edge of the eye is called the "eyewall". The eyewall typically expands outward with height, resembling an arena football stadium; this phenomenon is sometimes referred to as the "stadium effect". The eyewall is where the greatest wind speeds are found, air rises most rapidly, clouds reach their highest altitude, and precipitation is the heaviest. The heaviest wind damage occurs where a tropical cyclone's eyewall passes over land.

In a weaker storm, the eye may be obscured by the central dense overcast, which is the upper-level cirrus shield that is associated with a concentrated area of strong thunderstorm activity near the center of a tropical cyclone.

The eyewall may vary over time in the form of eyewall replacement cycles, particularly in intense tropical cyclones. Outer rainbands can organize into an outer ring of thunderstorms that slowly moves inward, which is believed to rob the primary eyewall of moisture and angular momentum. When the primary eyewall weakens, the tropical cyclone weakens temporarily. The outer eyewall eventually replaces the primary one at the end of the cycle, at which time the storm may return to its original intensity.

=== Size ===
Size descriptions of tropical cyclones
| ROCI (Diameter) | Type |
|---|---|
| Less than 2 degrees latitude | Very small/minor |
| 2 to 3 degrees of latitude | Small |
| 3 to 6 degrees of latitude | Medium/average/normal |
| 6 to 8 degrees of latitude | Large |
| Over 8 degrees of latitude | Very large |

Though large hurricane size does not imply strength—which is based on sustained wind measurements—it can mean that more people are exposed to its hazards.

There are a variety of metrics commonly used to measure storm size. The most common metrics include the radius of maximum wind, the radius of 34-knot (17 m/s; 63 km/h; 39 mph) wind (i.e. gale force), the radius of outermost closed isobar (ROCI), and the radius of vanishing wind. An additional metric is the radius at which the cyclone's relative vorticity field decreases to 1×10^{−5} s^{−1}.

On Earth, tropical cyclones span a large range of sizes, from 100–2,000 km (62–1,243 mi) as measured by the radius of vanishing wind. They are largest on average in the northwest Pacific Ocean basin and smallest in the northeastern Pacific Ocean basin. If the radius of outermost closed isobar is less than two degrees of latitude (222 km (138 mi)), then the cyclone is "very small" or a "midget". A radius of 3–6 latitude degrees (333–670 km (207–416 mi)) is considered "average sized". "Very large" tropical cyclones have a radius of greater than 8 degrees (888 km (552 mi)). Observations indicate that size is only weakly correlated to variables such as storm intensity (i.e. maximum wind speed), radius of maximum wind, latitude, and maximum potential intensity. Typhoon Tip is the largest cyclone on record, with tropical storm-force winds 2,170 km (1,350 mi) in diameter. The smallest storm on record is Tropical Storm Marco of 2008, which generated tropical storm-force winds only 37 km (23 mi) in diameter.

== Movement ==
The movement of a tropical cyclone (i.e. its "track") is typically approximated as the sum of two terms: "steering" by the background environmental wind and "beta drift". Some tropical cyclones can move across large distances, such as Hurricane John, the second longest-lasting tropical cyclone on record, which traveled 13,280 km (8,250 mi), the longest track of any Northern Hemisphere tropical cyclone, over its 31-day lifespan in 1994.

=== Environmental steering ===
Environmental steering is the primary influence on the motion of tropical cyclones. It represents the movement of the storm due to prevailing winds and other wider environmental conditions, similar to "leaves carried along by a stream".

Physically, the winds, or flow field, in the vicinity of a tropical cyclone may be treated as having two parts: the flow associated with the storm itself, and the large-scale background flow of the environment. Tropical cyclones can be treated as local maxima of vorticity suspended within the large-scale background flow of the environment. In this way, tropical cyclone motion may be represented to first-order as advection of the storm by the local environmental flow. This environmental flow is termed the "steering flow" and is the dominant influence on tropical cyclone motion. The strength and direction of the steering flow can be approximated as a vertical integration of the winds blowing horizontally in the cyclone's vicinity, weighted by the altitude at which those winds are occurring. Because winds can vary with height, determining the steering flow precisely can be difficult.

The pressure altitude at which the background winds are most correlated with a tropical cyclone's motion is known as the "steering level". The motion of stronger tropical cyclones is more correlated with the background flow averaged across a thicker portion of troposphere compared to weaker tropical cyclones whose motion is more correlated with the background flow averaged across a narrower extent of the lower troposphere. When wind shear and latent heat release is present, tropical cyclones tend to move towards regions where potential vorticity is increasing most quickly.

Climatologically, tropical cyclones are steered primarily westward by the east-to-west trade winds on the equatorial side of the subtropical ridge—a persistent high-pressure area over the world's subtropical oceans. In the tropical North Atlantic and Northeast Pacific oceans, the trade winds steer tropical easterly waves westward from the African coast toward the Caribbean Sea, North America, and ultimately into the central Pacific Ocean before the waves dampen out. These waves are the precursors to many tropical cyclones within this region. In contrast, in the Indian Ocean and Western Pacific in both hemispheres, tropical cyclogenesis is influenced less by tropical easterly waves and more by the seasonal movement of the Intertropical Convergence Zone and the monsoon trough. Other weather systems such as mid-latitude troughs and broad monsoon gyres can also influence tropical cyclone motion by modifying the steering flow.

=== Beta drift ===
In addition to environmental steering, a tropical cyclone will tend to drift poleward and westward, a motion known as "beta drift". This motion is due to the superposition of a vortex, such as a tropical cyclone, onto an environment in which the Coriolis force varies with latitude, such as on a sphere or beta plane. The magnitude of the component of tropical cyclone motion associated with the beta drift ranges between 1–3 m/s (3.6–10.8 km/h; 2.2–6.7 mph) and tends to be larger for more intense tropical cyclones and at higher latitudes. It is induced indirectly by the storm itself as a result of feedback between the cyclonic flow of the storm and its environment.

Physically, the cyclonic circulation of the storm advects environmental air poleward east of center and equatorial west of center. Because air must conserve its angular momentum, this flow configuration induces a cyclonic gyre equatorward and westward of the storm center and an anticyclonic gyre poleward and eastward of the storm center. The combined flow of these gyres acts to advect the storm slowly poleward and westward. This effect occurs even if there is zero environmental flow. Due to a direct dependence of the beta drift on angular momentum, the size of a tropical cyclone can affect the influence of beta drift on its motion; beta drift imparts a greater influence on the movement of larger tropical cyclones than that of smaller ones.

=== Multiple storm interaction ===
A third component of motion that occurs relatively infrequently involves the interaction of multiple tropical cyclones. When two cyclones approach one another, their centers will begin orbiting cyclonically about a point between the two systems. Depending on their separation distance and strength, the two vortices may simply orbit around one another, or else may spiral into the center point and merge. When the two vortices are of unequal size, the larger vortex will tend to dominate the interaction, and the smaller vortex will orbit around it. This phenomenon is called the Fujiwhara effect, after Sakuhei Fujiwhara.

=== Interaction with the mid-latitude westerlies ===
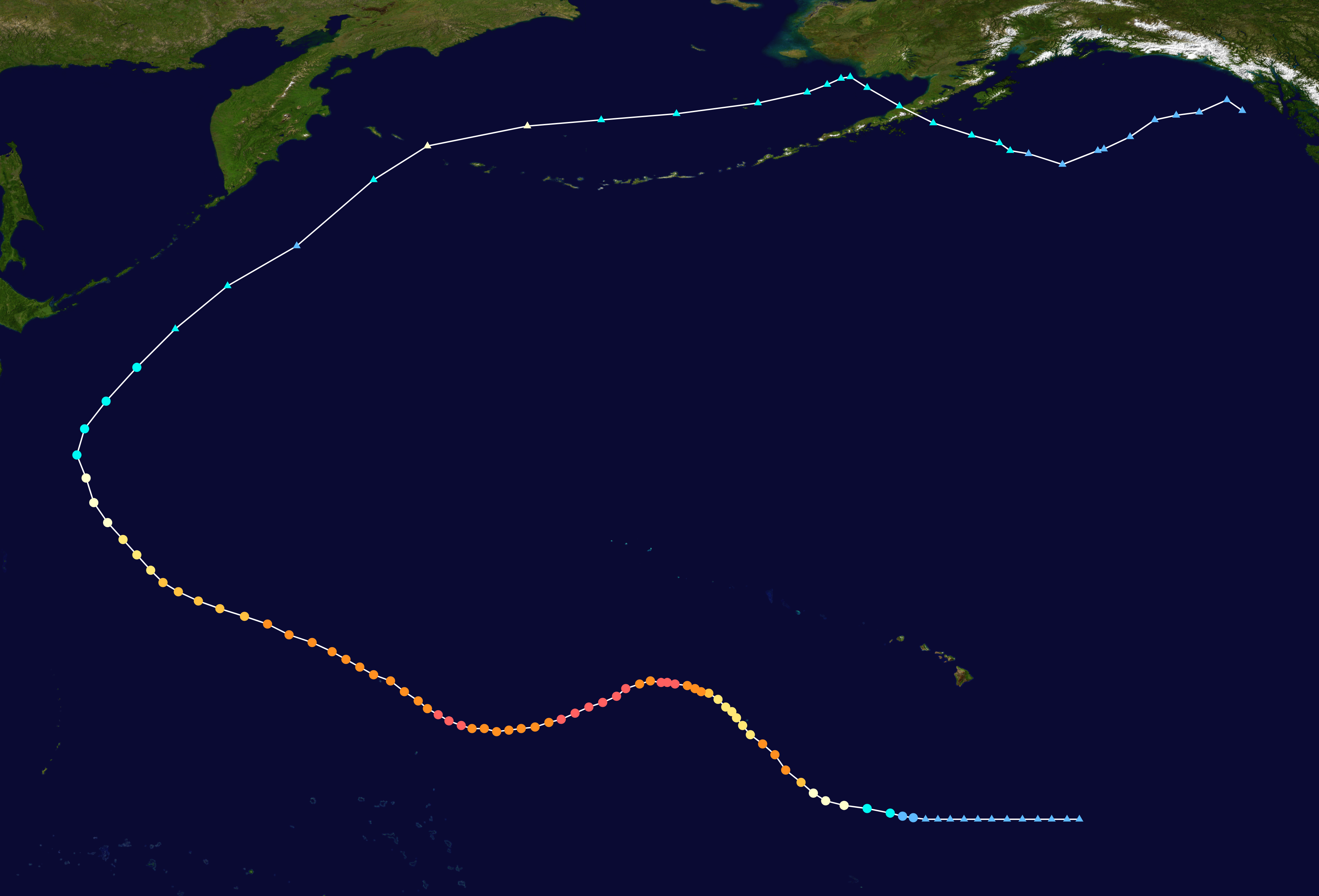
Storm track of Typhoon Ioke, showing recurvature off the Japanese coast in 2006

Though a tropical cyclone typically moves from east to west in the tropics, its track may shift poleward and eastward either as it moves west of the subtropical ridge axis or else if it interacts with the mid-latitude flow, such as the jet stream or an extratropical cyclone. This motion, termed "recurvature", commonly occurs near the western edge of the major ocean basins, where the jet stream typically has a poleward component and extratropical cyclones are common. An example of tropical cyclone recurvature was Typhoon Ioke in 2006.

== Effects ==
=== Natural phenomena caused or worsened by tropical cyclones ===
Tropical cyclones out at sea cause large waves, heavy rain, floods and high winds, disrupting international shipping and, at times, causing shipwrecks. Tropical cyclones stir up water, leaving a cool wake behind them, which causes the region to be less favorable for subsequent tropical cyclones. On land, strong winds can damage or destroy vehicles, buildings, bridges, and other outside objects, turning loose debris into deadly flying projectiles. The storm surge, or the increase in sea level due to the cyclone, is typically the worst effect from landfalling tropical cyclones, historically resulting in 90% of tropical cyclone deaths. Cyclone Mahina produced the highest storm surge on record, 13 m (43 ft), at Bathurst Bay, Queensland, Australia, in March 1899.

Other ocean-based hazards that tropical cyclones produce are rip currents and undertow. These hazards can occur hundreds of kilometers (hundreds of miles) away from the center of a cyclone, even if other weather conditions are favorable. The broad rotation of a landfalling tropical cyclone, and vertical wind shear at its periphery, spawns tornadoes. Tornadoes can also be spawned as a result of eyewall mesovortices, which persist until landfall. Hurricane Ivan produced 120 tornadoes, more than any other tropical cyclone. Lightning activity is produced within tropical cyclones. This activity is more intense within stronger storms and closer to and within the storm's eyewall. Tropical cyclones can increase the amount of snowfall a region experiences by delivering additional moisture. Wildfires can be worsened when a nearby storm fans their flames with its strong winds.

=== Effect on property and human life ===
Wind damage varies exponentially with wind speed, so that small increases in wind strength can dramatically increase damage. Damages rise by about a factor of four for every category increase in the Saffir–Simpson scale.

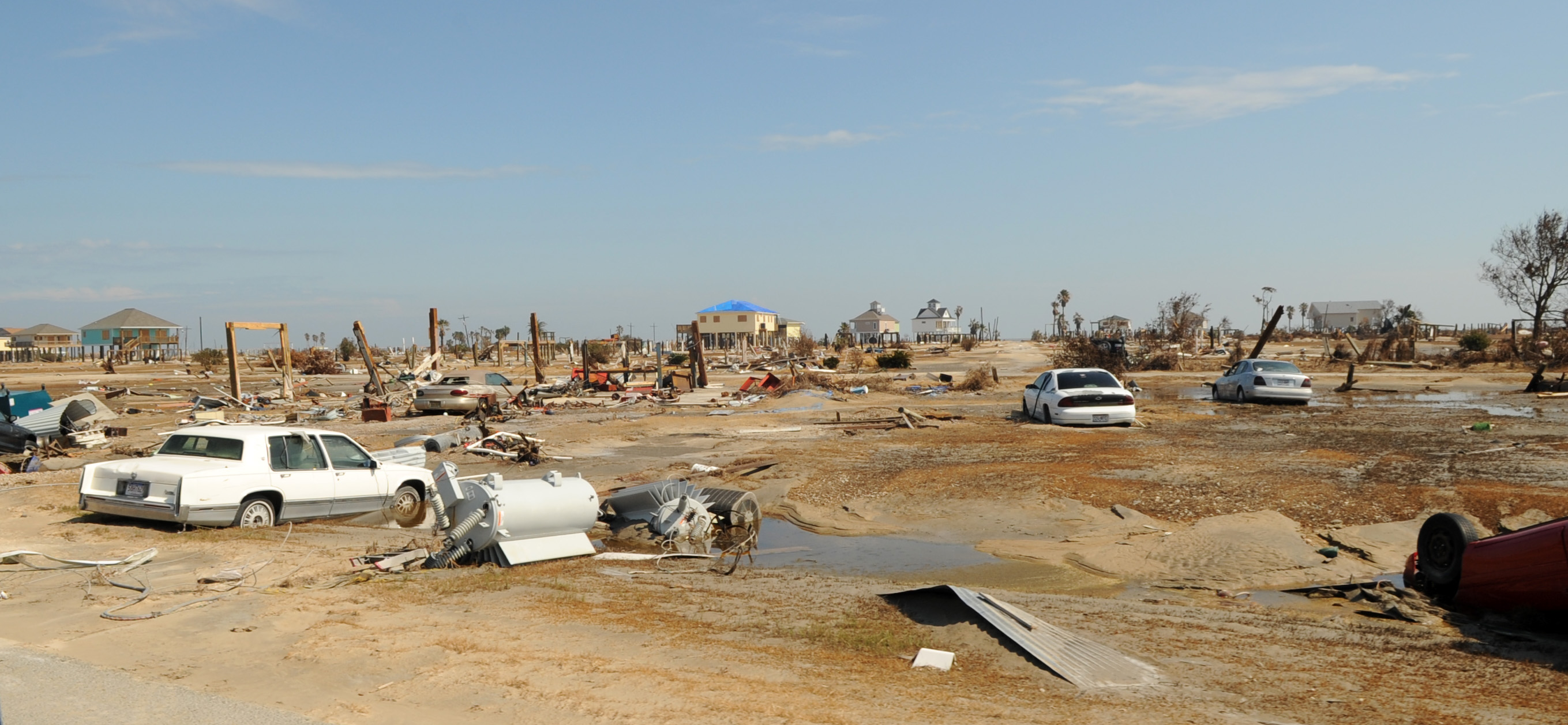
Aftermath of Hurricane Ike in Bolivar Peninsula, Texas

The number of $1 billion Atlantic hurricanes almost doubled from the 1980s to the 2010s, and inflation-adjusted costs have increased more than elevenfold. The increases have been attributed to climate change and to greater numbers of people moving to coastal areas.

Tropical cyclones regularly affect the coastlines of most of Earth's major bodies of water along the Atlantic, Pacific, and Indian oceans. Tropical cyclones have caused significant destruction and loss of human life, resulting in about 2 million deaths since the 19th century. Large areas of standing water caused by flooding lead to infection, as well as contributing to mosquito-borne illnesses. Crowded evacuees in shelters increase the risk of disease propagation. Tropical cyclones significantly interrupt infrastructure, leading to power outages, bridge and road destruction, and the hampering of reconstruction efforts.

Winds and water from storms can damage or destroy homes, buildings, and other manmade structures. Tropical cyclones destroy agriculture, kill livestock, and prevent access to marketplaces for both buyers and sellers; both of these result in financial losses. Powerful cyclones that make landfall – moving from the ocean to over land – are some of the most powerful, although that is not always the case. An average of 86 tropical cyclones of tropical storm intensity form annually worldwide, with 47 reaching hurricane or typhoon strength, and 20 becoming intense tropical cyclones, super typhoons, or major hurricanes (at least of Category 3 intensity).

==== Africa ====
In Africa, tropical cyclones can originate from tropical waves generated over the Sahara Desert, or otherwise strike the Horn of Africa and Southern Africa. Cyclone Idai in March 2019 hit central Mozambique, becoming the deadliest tropical cyclone on record in Africa, with 1,302 fatalities, and damage estimated at US$2.2 billion. Réunion island, located east of Southern Africa, experiences some of the wettest tropical cyclones on record. In January 1980, Cyclone Hyacinthe produced 6,083 mm (239.5 in) of rain over 15 days, which was the largest rain total recorded from a tropical cyclone on record.

==== Asia ====
In Asia, tropical cyclones from the Indian and Pacific oceans regularly affect some of the most populated countries on Earth. In 1970, a cyclone struck Bangladesh, then known as East Pakistan, producing a 6.1 m (20 ft) storm surge that killed at least 300,000 people. This made it the deadliest tropical cyclone on record. In October 2019, Typhoon Hagibis struck the Japanese island of Honshu and inflicted US$15 billion in damage, making it the costliest storm on record in Japan. The islands that comprise Oceania, from Australia to French Polynesia, are routinely affected by tropical cyclones. In Indonesia, a cyclone struck the island of Flores in April 1973, killing 1,653 people, making it the deadliest tropical cyclone recorded in the Southern Hemisphere.

==== North and South America ====
Atlantic and Pacific hurricanes regularly affect North America. In the United States, hurricanes Katrina in 2005 and Harvey in 2017 are the country's costliest ever natural disasters, with monetary damage estimated at US$125 billion. Katrina struck Louisiana and largely destroyed the city of New Orleans, while Harvey caused significant flooding in southeastern Texas after it dropped 60.58 in (1,539 mm) of rainfall; this was the highest rainfall total on record in the country.

The Caribbean islands are regularly hit by hurricanes, which have caused multiple humanitarian crises in Haiti since 2004 due in part to the lack of infrastructure and high population density in urban areas. In 2004, hurricane Jeanne caused severe flooding and mudslides, and a total estimated 3,006 deaths. More recently, in 2016, hurricane Matthew caused US$2.8 billion in damages, killing an estimated 674 people.

The northern portion of South America experiences occasional tropical cyclones, with 173 fatalities from Tropical Storm Bret in August 1993. The South Atlantic Ocean is generally inhospitable to the formation of a tropical storm. However, in March 2004, Hurricane Catarina struck southeastern Brazil as the first hurricane on record in the South Atlantic Ocean.

==== Europe ====
Europe is rarely affected by tropical cyclones; however, the continent regularly encounters storms after they transitioned into extratropical cyclones. Only one tropical depression – Vince in 2005 – struck Spain, and only one subtropical cyclone – Subtropical Storm Alpha in 2020 – struck Portugal. Occasionally, there are tropical-like cyclones in the Mediterranean Sea.

=== Environmental effects ===
Although cyclones take an enormous toll in lives and personal property, they may be important factors in the precipitation regimes of places they affect, as they may bring much-needed precipitation to otherwise dry regions. Their precipitation may also alleviate drought conditions by restoring soil moisture, though one study focused on the Southeastern United States suggested tropical cyclones did not offer significant drought recovery. Tropical cyclones also help maintain the global heat balance by moving warm, moist tropical air to the middle latitudes and polar regions, and by regulating the thermohaline circulation through upwelling. Research on Pacific cyclones has demonstrated that deeper layers of the ocean receive a heat transfer from these powerful storms.

The storm surge and winds of hurricanes may be destructive to human-made structures, but they also stir up the waters of coastal estuaries, which are typically important fish breeding locales. Ecosystems, such as saltmarshes and Mangrove forests, can be severely damaged or destroyed by tropical cyclones, which erode land and destroy vegetation. Tropical cyclones can cause harmful algae blooms to form in bodies of water by increasing the amount of nutrients available. Insect populations can decrease in both quantity and diversity after the passage of storms. Strong winds associated with tropical cyclones and their remnants are capable of felling thousands of trees, causing damage to forests.

When hurricanes surge upon shore from the ocean, salt is introduced to many freshwater areas and raises the salinity levels too high for some habitats to withstand. Some are able to cope with the salt and recycle it back into the ocean, but others can not release the extra surface water quickly enough or do not have a large enough freshwater source to replace it. Because of this, some species of plants and vegetation die due to the excess salt. Hurricanes can carry toxins and acids onshore when they make landfall. The floodwater can pick up the toxins from different spills and contaminate the land that it passes over. These toxins are harmful to the people and animals in the area, as well as the environment around them. Tropical cyclones can cause oil spills by damaging or destroying pipelines and storage facilities. Similarly, chemical spills have been reported when chemical and processing facilities were damaged. Waterways have become contaminated with toxic levels of metals such as nickel, chromium, and mercury during tropical cyclones.

Tropical cyclones can have an extensive effect on geography, such as creating or destroying land. Cyclone Bebe increased the size of Tuvalu island, Funafuti Atoll, by nearly 20%. Hurricane Walaka destroyed the small East Island in 2018, which destroyed the habitat for the endangered Hawaiian monk seal, as well as, threatened sea turtles and seabirds. Landslides frequently occur during tropical cyclones and can vastly alter landscapes. Some storms are capable of causing hundreds to tens of thousands of landslides. Storms can erode coastlines over an extensive area and transport the sediment to other locations.

== Observation and forecasting ==
=== Observation ===
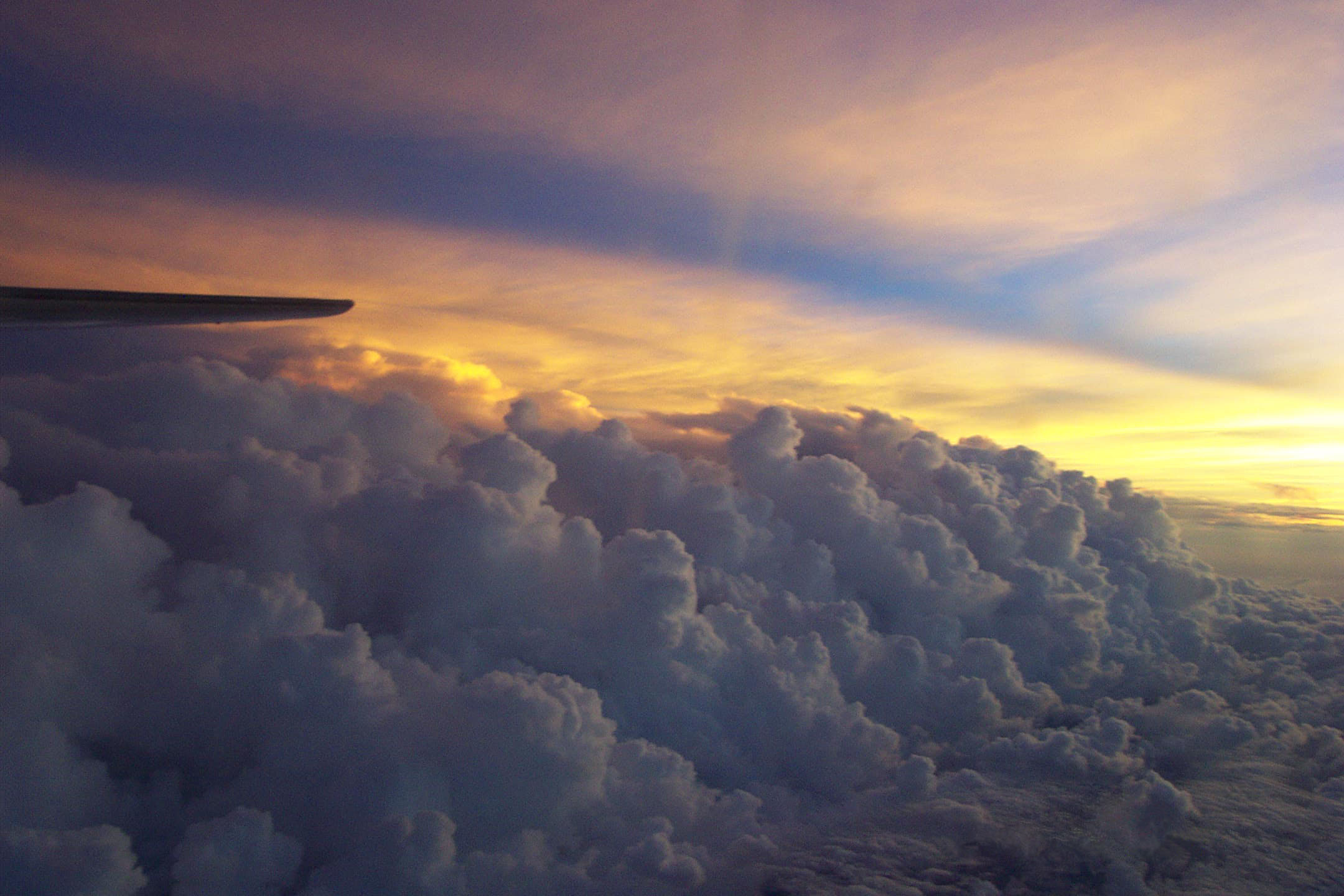
A sunset view of Hurricane Isidore's rainbands photographed at 2,100 m (7,000 ft)

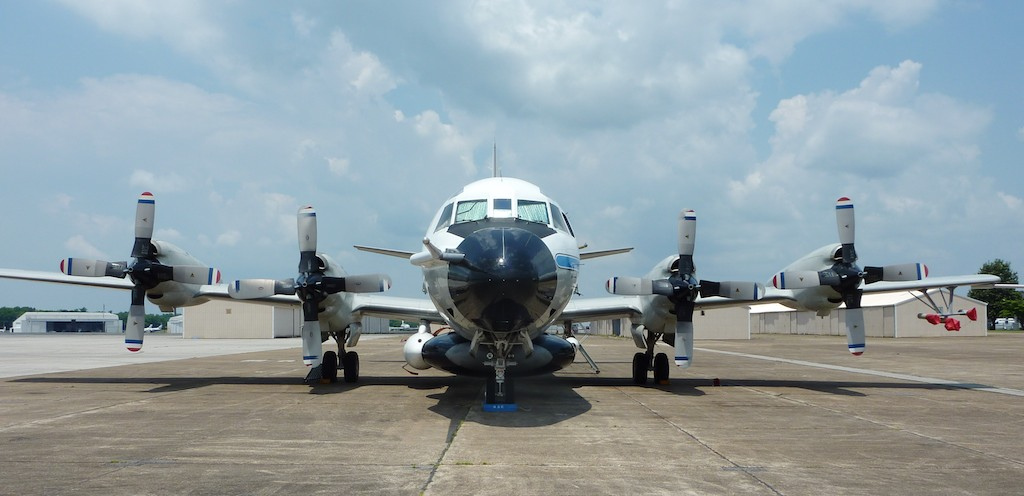
"Hurricane Hunter" – WP-3D Orion is used to go into the eye of a hurricane for data collection and measurements purposes.

Tropical cyclones have occurred around the world for millennia. Reanalyses and research are being undertaken to extend the historical record, through the usage of proxy data such as overwash deposits, beach ridges and historical documents such as diaries. Major tropical cyclones leave traces in overwash records and shell layers in some coastal areas, which have been used to gain insight into hurricane activity over the past thousands of years. Sediment records in Western Australia suggest an intense tropical cyclone in the 4th millennium BC.

Proxy records based on paleotempestological research have revealed that major hurricane activity along the Gulf of Mexico coast varies on timescales of centuries to millennia. In the year 957, a powerful typhoon struck southern China, killing around 10,000 people due to flooding. The Spanish colonization of Mexico described "tempestades" in 1730, although the official record for Pacific hurricanes only dates to 1949. In the south-west Indian Ocean, the tropical cyclone record goes back to 1848. In 2003, the Atlantic hurricane reanalysis project examined and analyzed the historical record of tropical cyclones in the Atlantic back to 1851, extending the existing database from 1886.

Before satellite imagery became available during the 20th century, many of these systems went undetected unless it impacted land or a ship encountered it by chance. Often in part because of the threat of hurricanes, many coastal regions had sparse population between major ports until the advent of automobile tourism; therefore, the most severe portions of hurricanes striking the coast may have gone unmeasured in some instances. The combined effects of ship destruction and remote landfall severely limit the number of intense hurricanes in the official record before the era of hurricane reconnaissance aircraft and satellite meteorology. Although the record shows a distinct increase in the number and strength of intense hurricanes, therefore, experts regard the early data as suspect. The ability of climatologists to make a long-term analysis of tropical cyclones is limited by the amount of reliable historical data.

In the 1940s, routine aircraft reconnaissance started in both the Atlantic and Western Pacific basin in the mid-1940s, which provided ground truth data. Early flights were only made once or twice a day. In 1960, Polar-orbiting weather satellites were first launched by the United States National Aeronautics and Space Administration, but were not declared operational until 1965. It took several years for some of the warning centers to take advantage of this new viewing platform and develop the expertise to associate satellite signatures with storm position and intensity.

Intense tropical cyclones pose a particular observation challenge, as they are a dangerous oceanic phenomenon, and weather stations, being relatively sparse, are rarely available on the site of the storm itself. In general, surface observations are available only if the storm is passing over an island or a coastal area, or if there is a nearby ship. Real-time measurements are usually taken in the periphery of the cyclone, where conditions are less catastrophic and its true strength cannot be evaluated. For this reason, there are teams of meteorologists that move into the path of tropical cyclones to help evaluate their strength at the point of landfall.

Tropical cyclones are tracked by weather satellites capturing visible and infrared images from space, usually at half-hour to quarter-hour intervals. As a storm approaches land, it can be observed by land-based Doppler weather radar. Radar plays a crucial role around landfall by showing a storm's location and intensity every several minutes. Other satellites provide information from the perturbations of GPS signals, providing thousands of snapshots per day and capturing atmospheric temperature, pressure, and moisture content.

In situ measurements, in real-time, can be taken by sending specially equipped reconnaissance flights into the cyclone. In the Atlantic basin, these flights are regularly flown by United States government hurricane hunters. These aircraft fly directly into the cyclone and take direct and remote-sensing measurements. The aircraft launch GPS dropsondes inside the cyclone. These sondes measure temperature, humidity, pressure, and especially winds between flight level and the ocean's surface. A new era in hurricane observation began when a remotely piloted Aerosonde, a small drone aircraft, was flown through Tropical Storm Ophelia as it passed Virginia's eastern shore during the 2005 hurricane season. A similar mission was also completed successfully in the western Pacific Ocean.

=== Forecasting ===
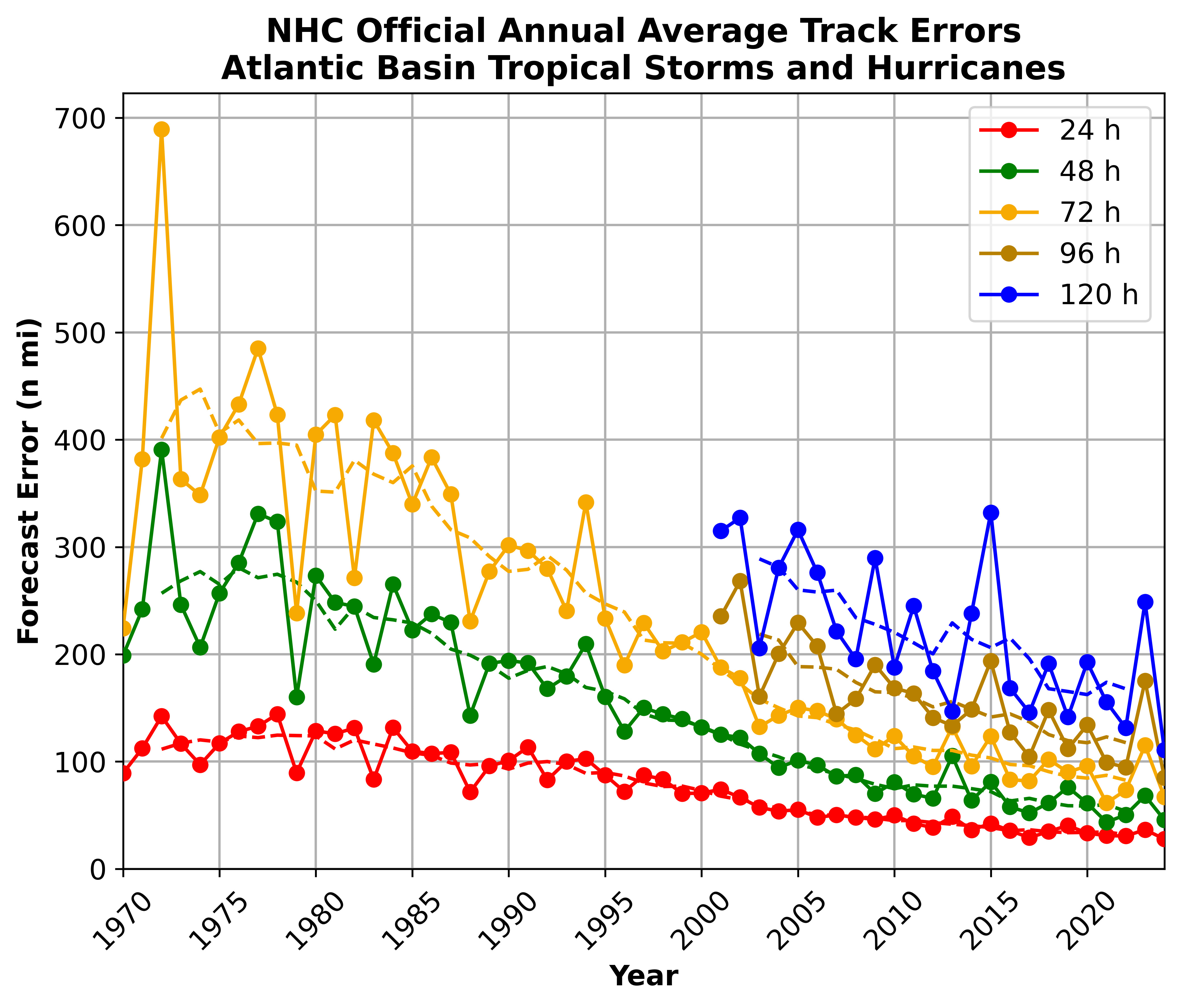
A general decrease in error trends in tropical cyclone path prediction is evident since the 1970s.

High-speed computers and sophisticated simulation software allow forecasters to produce computer models that predict tropical cyclone tracks based on the future position and strength of high- and low-pressure systems. Combining forecast models with increased understanding of the forces that act on tropical cyclones, as well as with a wealth of data from Earth-orbiting satellites and other sensors, scientists have increased the accuracy of track forecasts over recent decades.

However, scientists are not as skillful at predicting the intensity of tropical cyclones. The lack of improvement in intensity forecasting is attributed to the complexity of tropical systems and an incomplete understanding of factors that affect their development. New tropical cyclone position and forecast information is available at least every six hours from the various warning centers.

== Awareness and response ==
=== Preparations ===
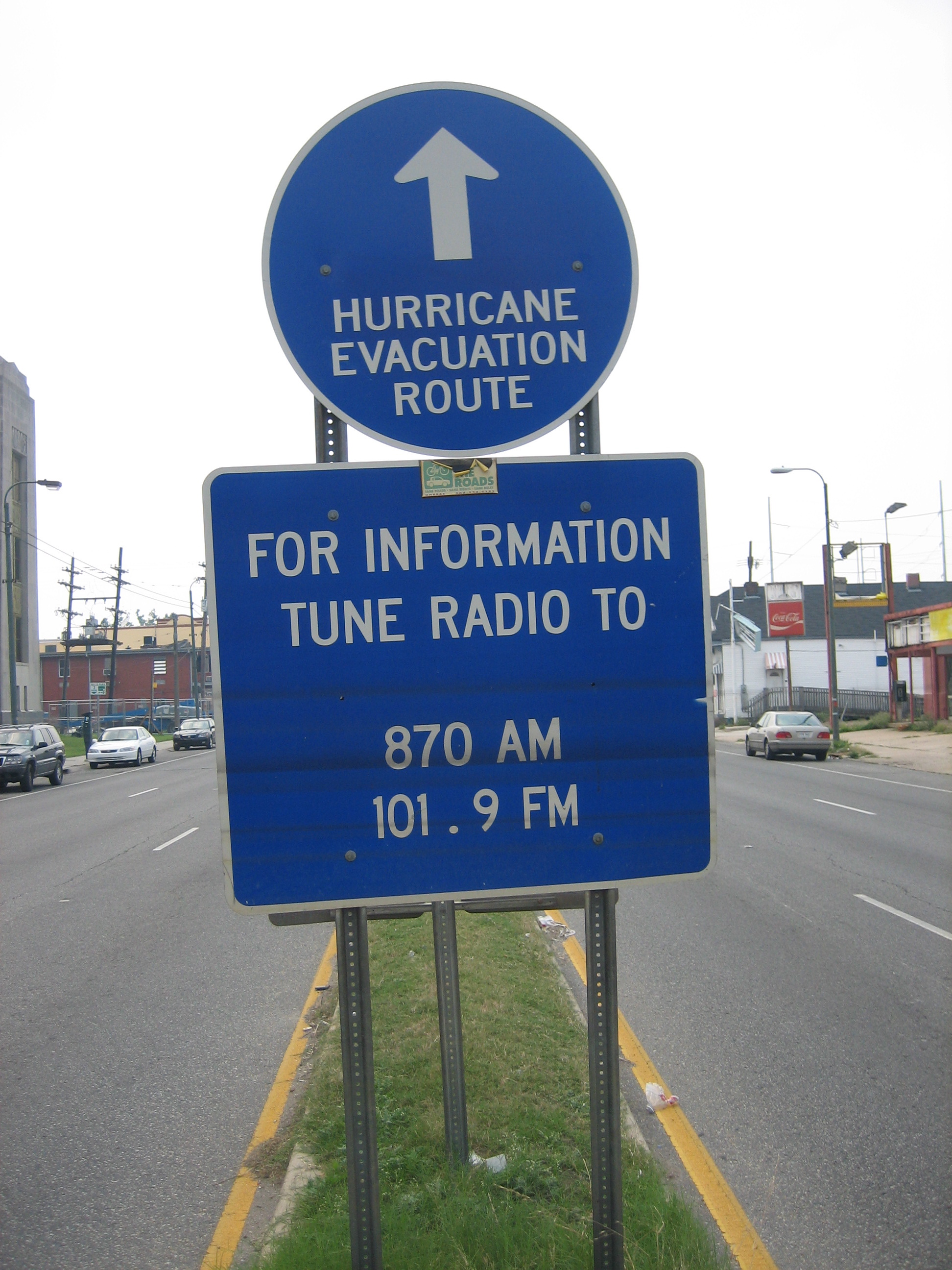
Evacuation route sign on Tulane Avenue in New Orleans shows lines from long standing floodwaters after Hurricane Katrina.

Ahead of the formal season starting, people are urged to prepare for the effects of a tropical cyclone by politicians and weather forecasters, among others. They prepare by determining their risk to the different types of weather, tropical cyclones cause, checking their insurance coverage and emergency supplies, as well as determining where to evacuate to if needed. When a tropical cyclone develops and is forecast to impact land, each member nation of the World Meteorological Organization issues various watches and warnings to cover the expected effects. However, there are some exceptions with the United States National Hurricane Center and Fiji Meteorological Service responsible for issuing or recommending warnings for other nations in their area of responsibility.

An important decision in individual preparedness is determining if and when to evacuate an area that will be affected by a tropical cyclone. Tropical cyclone tracking charts allow people to track ongoing systems to form their own opinions regarding where the storms are going and whether or not they need to prepare for the system being tracked, including possible evacuation. This continues to be encouraged by the National Oceanic and Atmospheric Administration and National Hurricane Center.

=== Response ===
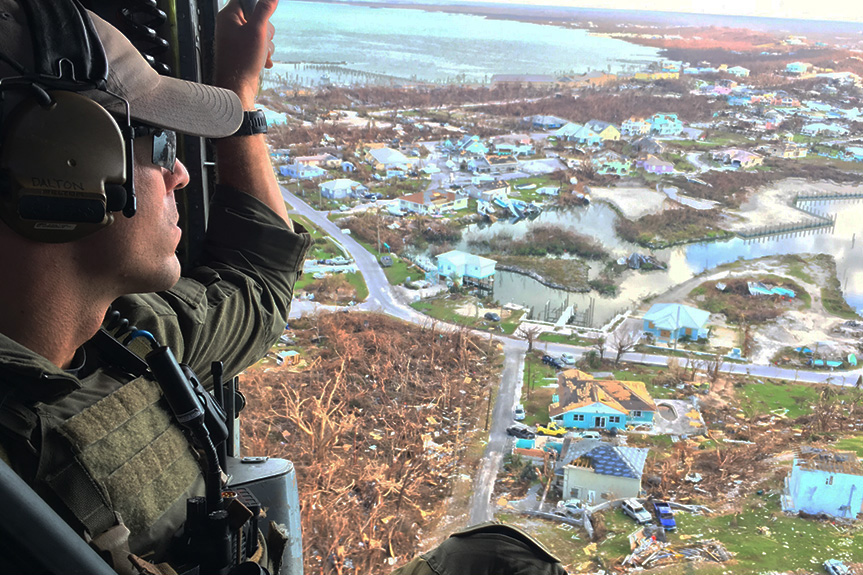
Relief efforts for Hurricane Dorian in the Bahamas

Hurricane response is the disaster response after a hurricane. Activities performed by hurricane responders include assessment, restoration, and demolition of buildings; removal of debris and waste; repairs to land-based and maritime infrastructure; and public health services including search and rescue operations. Hurricane response requires coordination between federal, tribal, state, local, and private entities. According to the National Voluntary Organizations Active in Disaster, potential response volunteers should affiliate with established organizations and should not self-deploy, so that proper training and support can be provided to mitigate the danger and stress of response work.

Hurricane responders face many hazards. Hurricane responders may be exposed to chemical and biological contaminants including stored chemicals, sewage, human remains, and mold growth encouraged by flooding, as well as asbestos and lead that may be present in older buildings. Common injuries arise from falls from heights, such as from a ladder or from level surfaces; from electrocution in flooded areas, including from backfeed from portable generators; or from motor vehicle accidents. Long and irregular shifts may lead to sleep deprivation and fatigue, increasing the risk of injuries, and workers may experience mental stress associated with a traumatic incident. Heat stress is a concern as workers are often exposed to hot and humid temperatures, wear protective clothing and equipment, and have physically difficult tasks.

== Extraterrestrial tropical cyclones ==
Animated tracks of simulated tropical cyclones on tidally locked red dwarf exoplanets.

Limited research has been conducted on the possibility of tropical cyclogenesis on other worlds. Polar vortices with structures similar to tropical cyclones have been found on other planets in the Solar System, such as Venus's north polar vortex and Saturn's Hexagon. The four giant planets frequently generate large and extremely powerful storm systems, such as the Great Red Spot on Jupiter and the Great Dark Spots on Neptune, but these storms are anticyclones. Tropical cyclones are regarded as a feature unique to Earth.

Titan, the largest moon of Saturn, is the only other world in the Solar System known to host large bodies of liquid on its surface. It also hosts a "methane cycle," where liquid hydrocarbons power weather systems much like water does on Earth. Despite the appearance of many cloud features, no low-level cyclones have been observed. A 2013 study determined that Titan's tropics are not favorable for tropical cyclogenesis, as its equatorial regions only host isolated lakes and is subject to high wind shear. The Coriolis force is also much weaker on Titan due to its long rotation period (nearly 16 days). However, the study found that hydrocarbon polar seas may contain enough thermal energy to power tropical cyclones. Genesis could be aided by waves generated in the Seasonal Convergence Zone (SCZ), Titan's counterpart to the ITCZ; unlike the ITCZ, the SCZ swings from polar region to polar region as seasons progress. Wind shear in the polar regions is more favorable for tropical cyclogenesis, and the high latitudes in which the polar seas are located could help counter the low Coriolis force to an extent.

Exoplanetary climates may be influenced by tropical cyclones, encouraging theoretical analyses of tropical cyclone frequency and distribution on Earth-like exoplanets. Earth-sized exoplanets are expected to be common around dim red dwarf stars; for these planets to sustain liquid water oceans, they must orbit very close to their parent star. As a result, many such planets are likely to be tidally locked, with slower rotation periods and one hemisphere permanently facing the star. Early planetary climate models with Earth-like atmospheres suggested that tidally locked exoplanets are capable of hosting environments conducive for tropical cyclogenesis, albeit favorability is limited by their slow rotation rates. Further simulations supported the viability of tropical cyclones on tidally locked planets. A 2020 study found that tropical cyclones are more common for planets near the inner edge of the habitable zone, with cyclones forming in both the day and night hemispheres on such planets. A 2024 study further explored the influence of rotation periods on tropical cyclogenesis, concluding that planets with intermediate (8 day) rotation periods are most favorable for tropical cyclogenesis, though weak tropical cyclone-like systems spawned on planets with long (16 day) rotation periods as well.

== See also ==
- Cyclone – Large scale rotating air mass
- Tropical cyclones by year
- Tropical cyclones in 2026
- 2026 Atlantic hurricane season
- 2026 Pacific hurricane season
- 2026 Pacific typhoon season
- 2026 North Indian Ocean cyclone season
- 2026–27 South-West Indian Ocean cyclone season
- 2026–27 Australian region cyclone season
- 2026–27 South Pacific cyclone season
