= 2025 North Indian Ocean cyclone season =

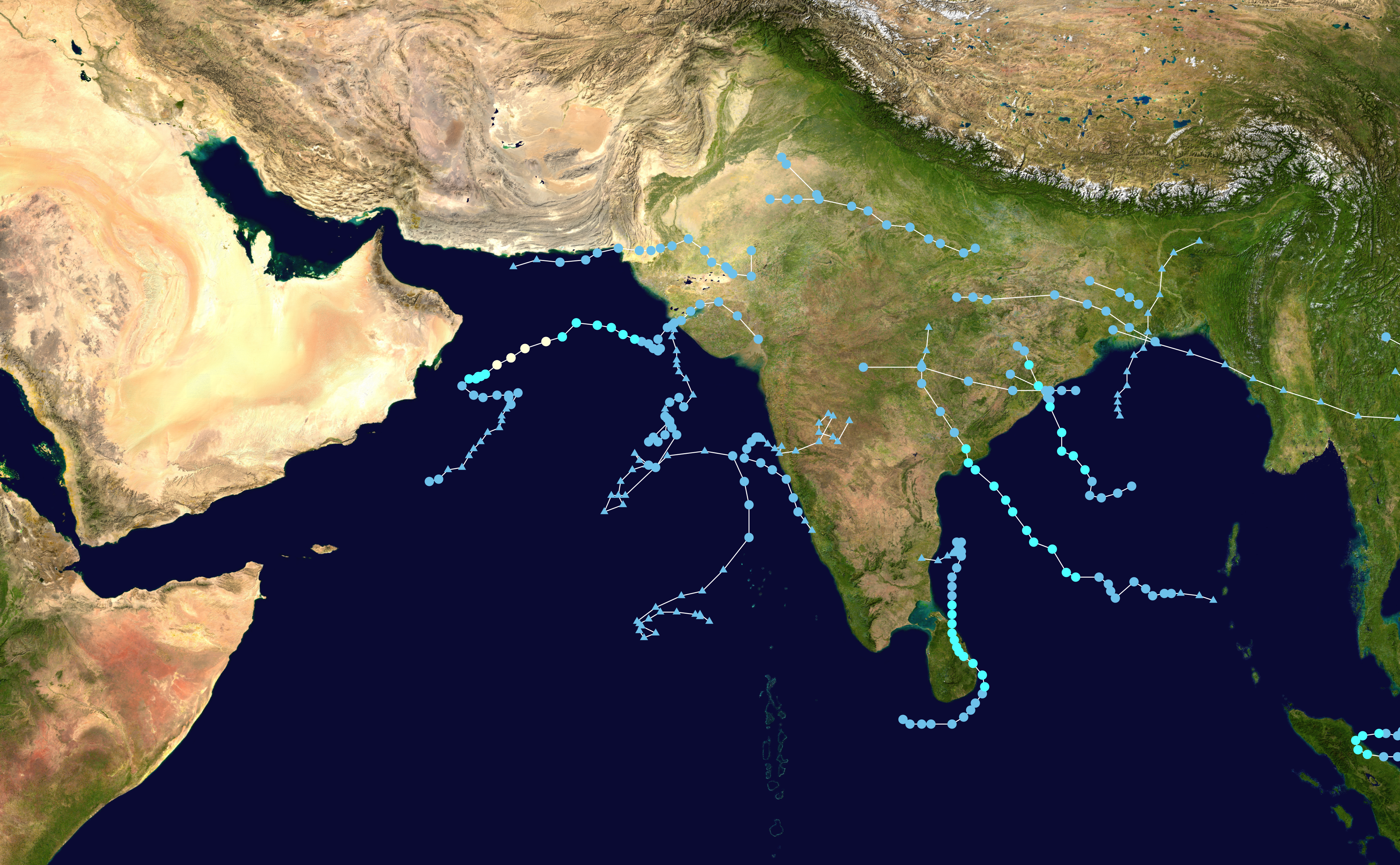
- Season summary map

Seasonal boundaries
- First system formed: 24 May 2025
- Last system dissipated: 3 December 2025

Strongest storm
- By maximum sustained winds: Shakhti
  - Maximum winds: 110 km/h (70 mph) (3-minute sustained)
  - Lowest pressure: 987 hPa (mbar)
- By central pressure: BOB 01
  - Maximum winds: 55 km/h (35 mph) (3-minute sustained)
  - Lowest pressure: 986 hPa (mbar)

Seasonal statistics
- Depressions: 14
- Deep depressions: 6
- Cyclonic storms: 4
- Severe cyclonic storms: 2
- Total fatalities: 3,110 total
- Total damage: $24.8 billion (2025 USD)

Related articles
- 2025 Atlantic hurricane season; 2025 Pacific hurricane season; 2025 Pacific typhoon season

The 2025 North Indian Ocean cyclone season was the costliest season on record and the deadliest since 2008. The season featured several deadly tropical cyclones, including cyclones Senyar and Ditwah. Senyar was the first recorded cyclone to form in the Strait of Malacca, producing deadly floods across Indonesia, Thailand, and Malaysia and claiming over 1,501 lives, with Cyclone Ditwah meandered near Sri Lanka for several days, killing 647 people in the country in November 2025. The season itself saw an above-average number of depressions forming, and an average amount of cyclonic storms forming. Seasons have no official bounds, but cyclones tend to form between April and December, with the peak from May to November. However, this year, the first cyclone attained that strength on October 3rd. These dates conventionally delimit the period of each year when most tropical cyclones form in the northern Indian Ocean.

The scope of this article is limited to the Indian Ocean in the Northern Hemisphere, east of the Horn of Africa and west of the Malay Peninsula. There are two main seas in the North Indian Ocean—the Arabian Sea to the west of the Indian subcontinent, abbreviated ARB by the India Meteorological Department (IMD); and the Bay of Bengal to the east as BOB. The systems that form over land are abbreviated as LAND.

The official Regional Specialized Meteorological Centre in this basin is the IMD, while the Joint Typhoon Warning Center (JTWC) releases unofficial advisories. On average, four to five cyclonic storms form in this basin every season.

== Season summary ==
A depression formed on 24 May in the Arabian Sea off the coast of Konkan, named ARB 01. It made a landfall on India soon after, bringing heavy rain to the region after degrading into a tropical low. It peaked with 30 mph 3-min winds and a minimum barometric pressure of 997 hPa (mbar). On 29 May, Depression BOB 01 formed near West Bengal. It strengthened into a Deep Depression three hours later on the IMD scale. It made landfall on the border of West Bengal and Bangladesh 6 hours later at its peak of 35 mph 3-min winds and a minimum barometric pressure of 988 hPa (mbar). It weakened and dissipated over Bangladesh over the next 36 hours, bringing heavy rain to the region. 65 people died from the resulting landslides and flooding.

After a lull in activity, Depression BOB 02 formed over West Bengal on 14 July from a well-marked low that moved inland a day prior. The next day, another depression was designated LAND 01. It quickly dissipated after forming over Northwestern India. BOB 02 dissipated but soon regenerated, causing it to be assigned a new name, LAND 03, despite there being no recorded evidence of a LAND 02. Soon after it dissipated for good, a new Depression emerged in the extreme northern Bay of Bengal, designated as BOB 04, but, similar to BOB 02/LAND 03, there was no evidence of a BOB 03. It moved inland and soon dissipated, but brought extreme rain and flooding to the affected areas.

== Systems ==
=== Depression ARB 01 ===
- Depression (IMD)
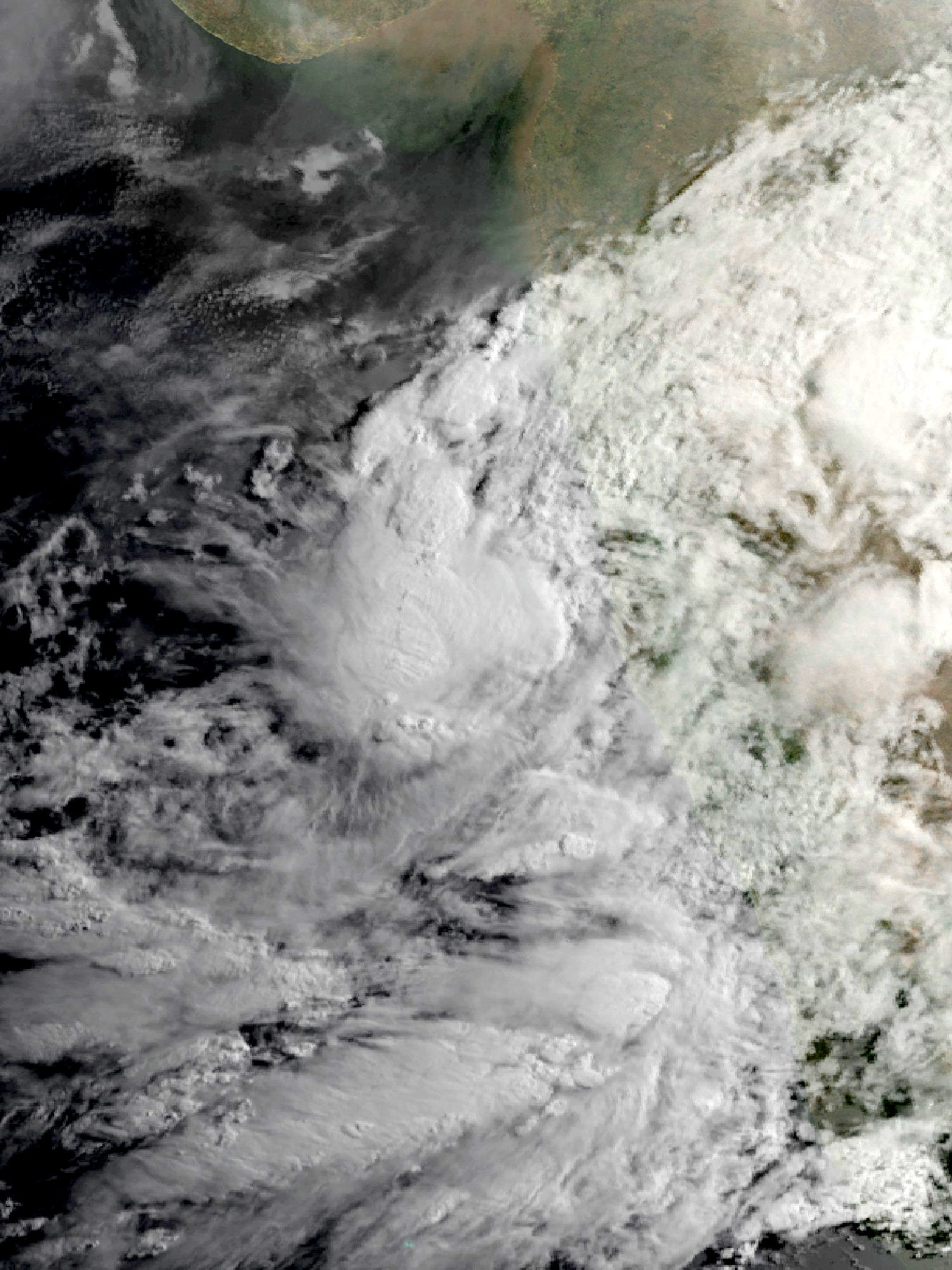
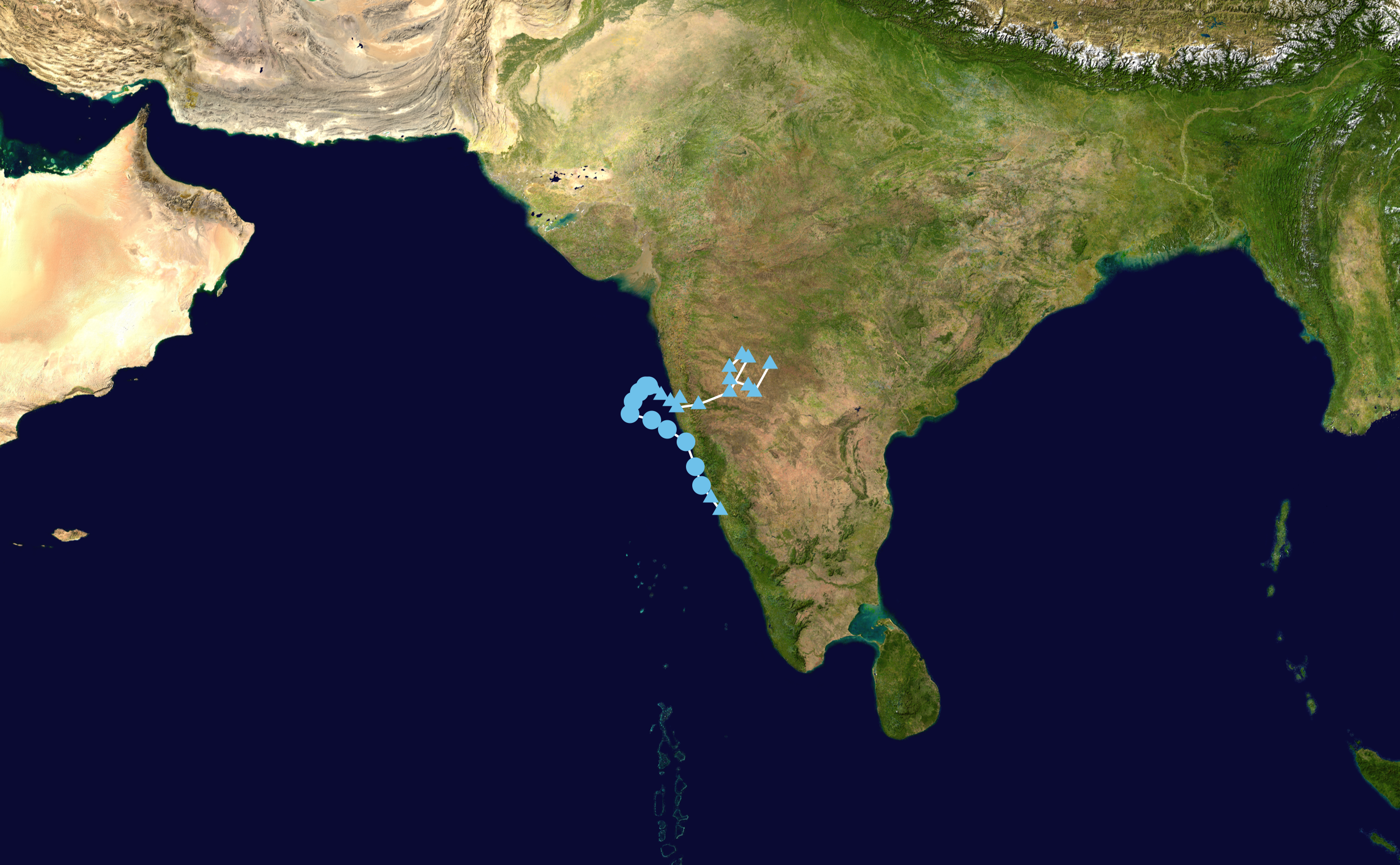
- Duration: 24 May – 25 May
- Peak intensity: 45 km/h (30 mph) (3-min); 998 hPa (mbar)

On 21 May, a tropical disturbance designated as Invest 93A formed in the Arabian Sea near the west coast of India, approximately 165 nautical miles (306 km) south-southwest of Mumbai. Favorable environmental conditions including warm sea surface temperatures and moderate wind shear allowed the system to gradually consolidate. The India Meteorological Department (IMD) forecasted its intensification into a cyclonic storm within 2 to 3 days, prompting orange and yellow weather warnings along the Konkan and Gujarat coasts, as well as widespread rainfall alerts across Kerala. This system marked the onset of tropical cyclone activity in the North Indian Ocean basin for the 2025 season.

Under the influence of the tropical disturbance, a low pressure area formed over the eastern Arabian Sea off the southern Konkan-Goa coasts by 05:30 IST on 22 May. By 05:30 IST on 23 May, it became a well marked low pressure area off the southern Konkan coast and persisted over the same region as of 08:30 IST. The system organised into a depression by 05:30 IST on 24 May about 40 km northwest of Ratnagiri. Over the next 6 hours, the depression moved slowly eastward at a speed of 5 km/h and between 11:30 and 12:30 IST it made landfall, crossing the south Konkan coast near Ratnagiri. The maximum sustained windspeed at the time was 25 knots (46 km/h) gusting to 35 knots (65 km/h). The system then moved eastwards inland, and by 05:30 IST on 25 May, the system had weakened back into a well marked low pressure area over southern Madhya Maharastra and the adjoining regions of Marathwada and Karnataka.

=== Deep Depression BOB 01 ===
- Deep depression (IMD)
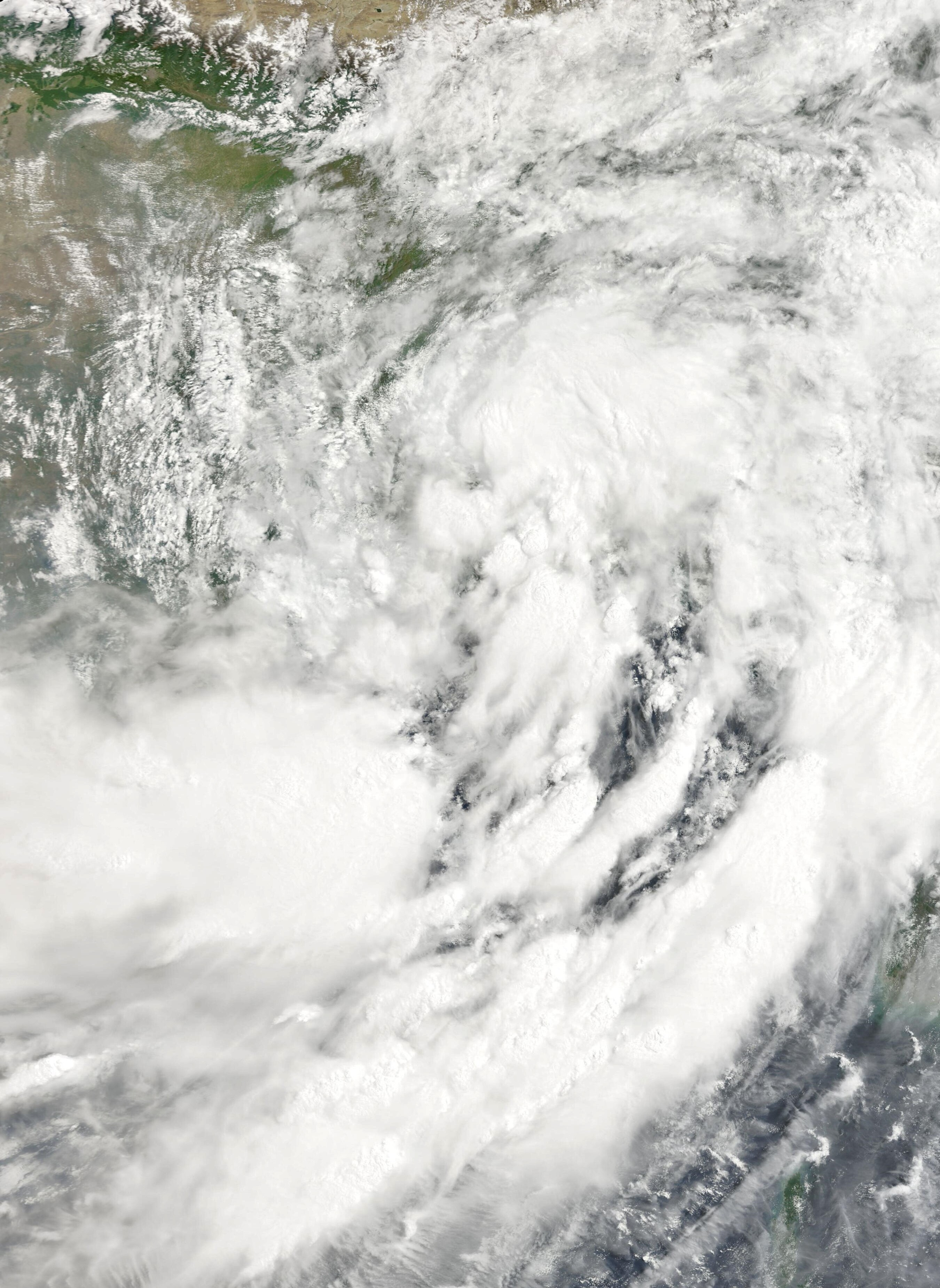
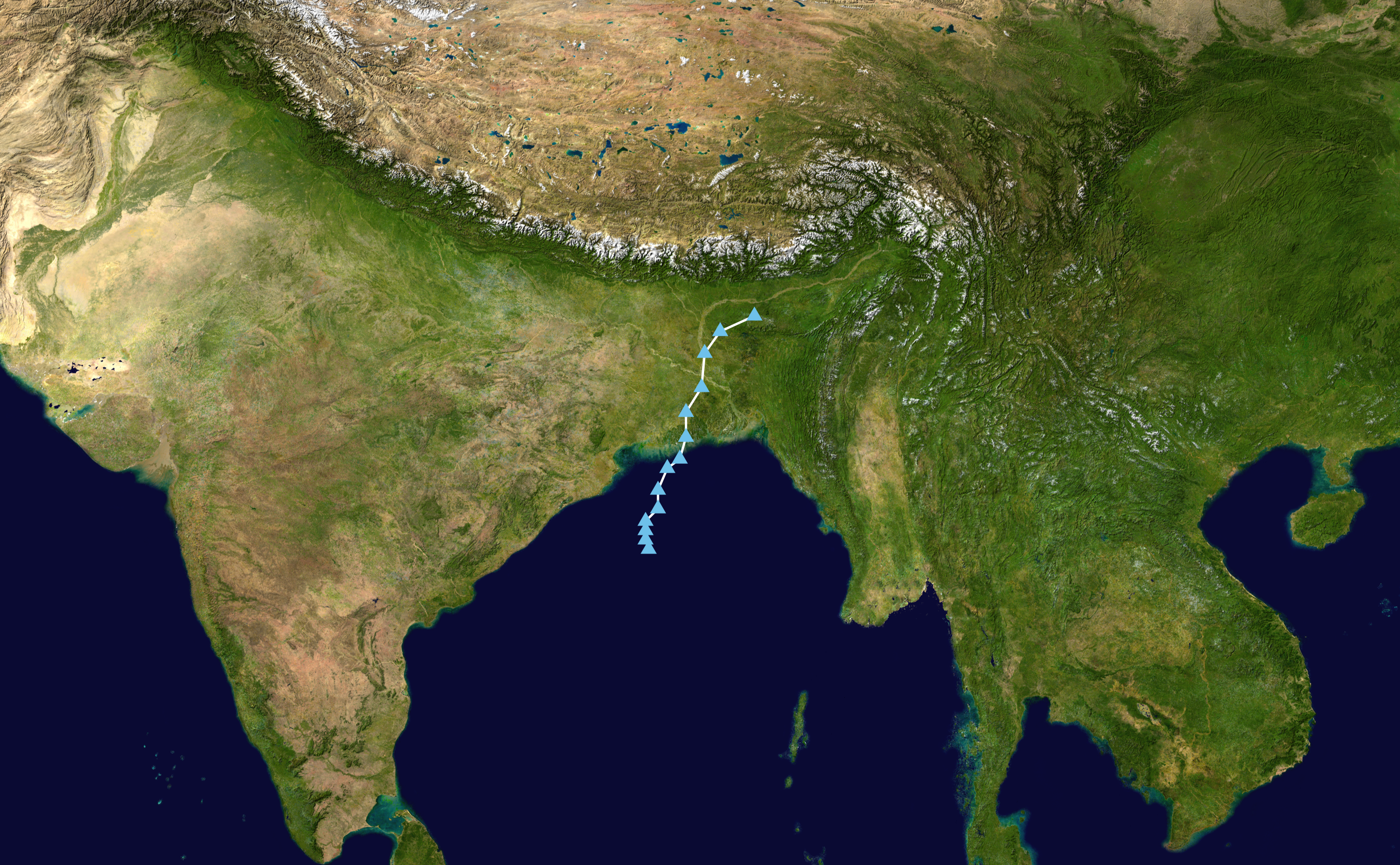
- Duration: 29 May – 30 May
- Peak intensity: 55 km/h (35 mph) (3-min); 986 hPa (mbar)

A low pressure area formed over northwest Bay of Bengal off the coast of Odisha at 08:30 IST on 27 May. Favorable environmental conditions including warm sea surface temperatures, moderate vertical wind shear over the system and the presence of warm air over Gangetic West Bengal and Bangladesh allowed it to gradually consolidate. However, the strong wind shear in the region due to the advancing southwest monsoon and insufficient time over sea before landfall limited its intensification. It became well marked at 05:30 IST on 28 May and persisted over the same region. By 05:30 IST on 29 May, the system coalesced into a depression near the coasts of West Bengal and Bangladesh. Thereafter, the depression moved nearly northwards and by 08:30 IST on the same day, it intensified into a deep depression. Over the next 6 hours, the system continued to move nearly northwards and made landfall on the West Bengal–Bangladesh coast between Sagar Island and Khepupara, close to Raidighi. Its maximum sustained windspeed at the time was 30 knots (56 km/h) gusting to 40 knots (74 km/h). It then tracked north-northeastward inland, and by 05:30 IST on 30 May the system had weakened back into a depression over Bangladesh. By 17:30 IST on the same day, it had degenerated into a well marked low over Meghalaya due to interaction with rugged terrain.

As a result of the system, Noakhali received 168 mm (6.6 in) and Dhaka 88 mm (3.5 in) of rainfall on 29 May. The same day, Kolkata received light to moderate rainfall with Jinjirabazar receiving 23 mm (0.91 in) of rainfall in a timespan from noon to 20:00 IST. It caused floods and landslides which killed 61, left 10 missing and affected 6.1 million people in India, with 27 deaths in Assam, 12 in Arunachal Pradesh, 6 each in Meghalaya and Mizoram, 4 in Manipur, 3 in Sikkim, 2 in Tripura and 1 in Nagaland. Four additional deaths occurred in Bangladesh, including 2 in Dhaka and 1 in Moheshkhali, while 8 others went missing when a trawler sank near Kutubdia. In Moheshkhali and Kutubdia, over 100 homes and farmland were flooded. Another person was killed by a collapsing wall, 11 were injured by lightning strikes, over 1,400 homes were damaged and 53 landslides were observed across 33 Rohingya refugee camps. The system brought heavy rainfall and strong winds to Myanmar as well. As a result, 26 homes were destroyed and 22 others were damaged in Yegyi and Dedaye Townships.

=== Depression BOB 02/LAND 03 ===
- Depression (IMD)
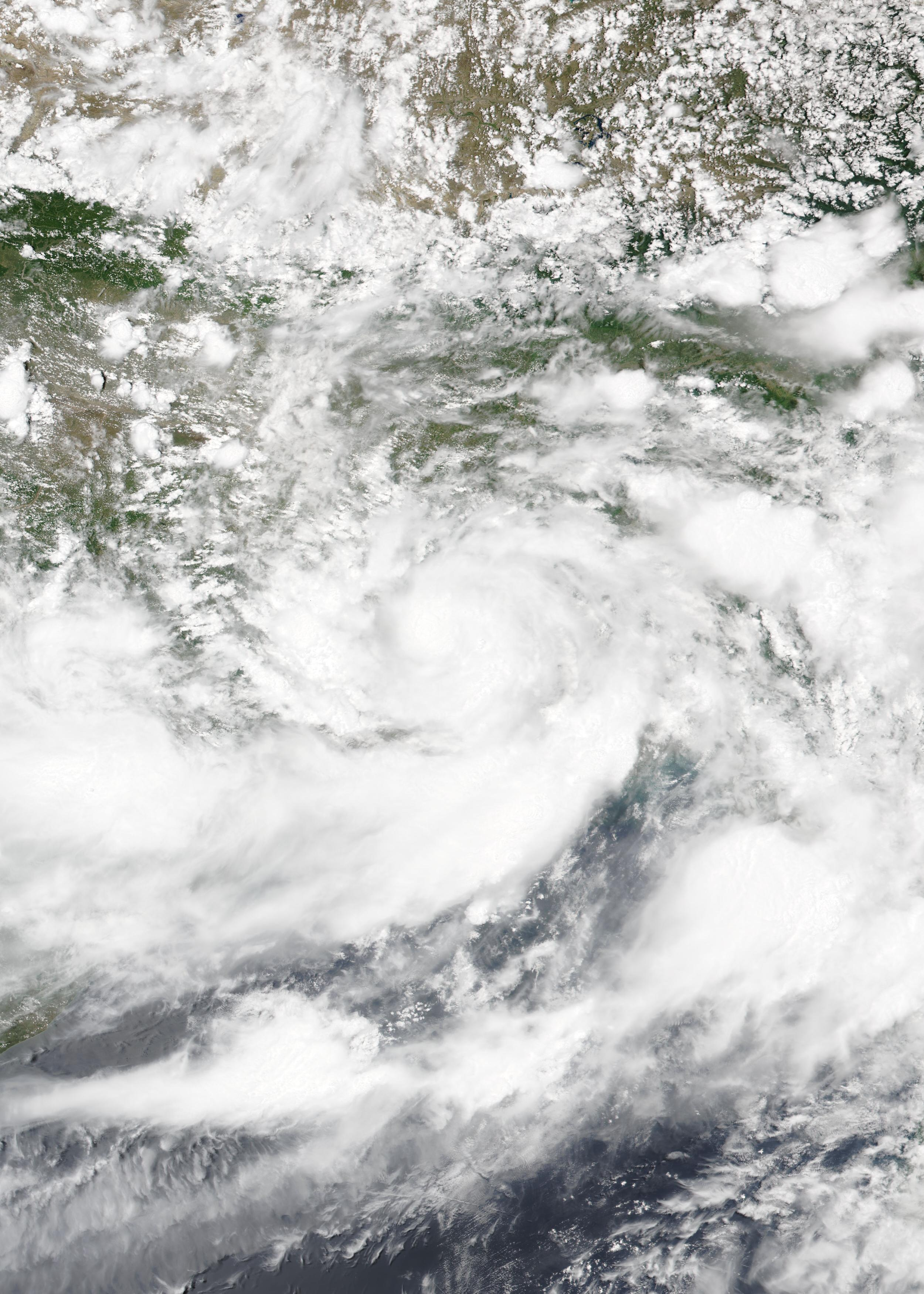
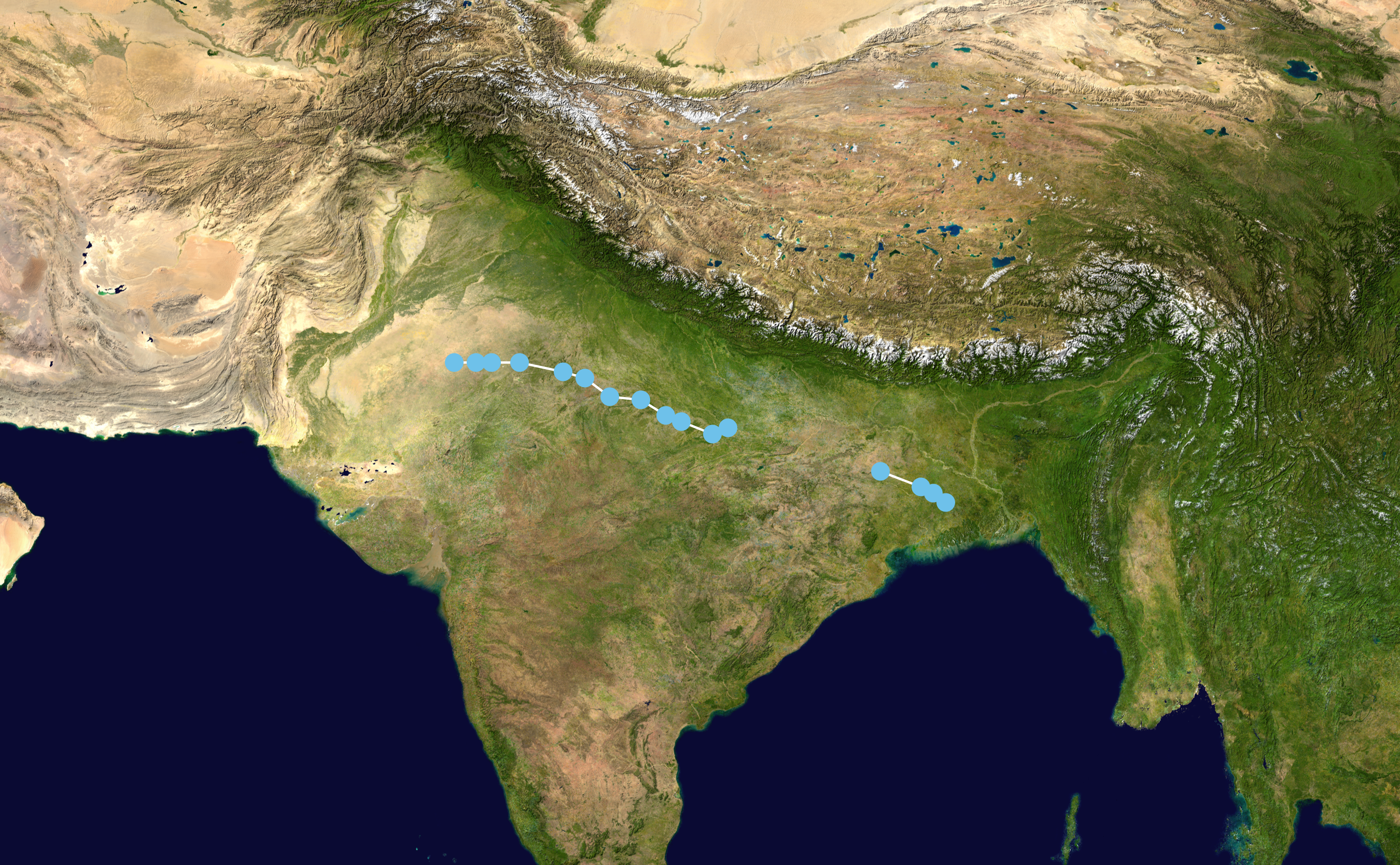
- Duration: 14 July – 20 July
- Peak intensity: 45 km/h (30 mph) (3-min); 993 hPa (mbar)

On 14 July, a circulation previously marked as a well-defined low consolidated into a depression while over West Bengal, near Bangladesh, at 06:00 UTC. It weakened to a well-defined low on 16 July with it re-intensifying to a depression on the next day, according to the IMD.

=== Depression LAND 01 ===
- Depression (IMD)
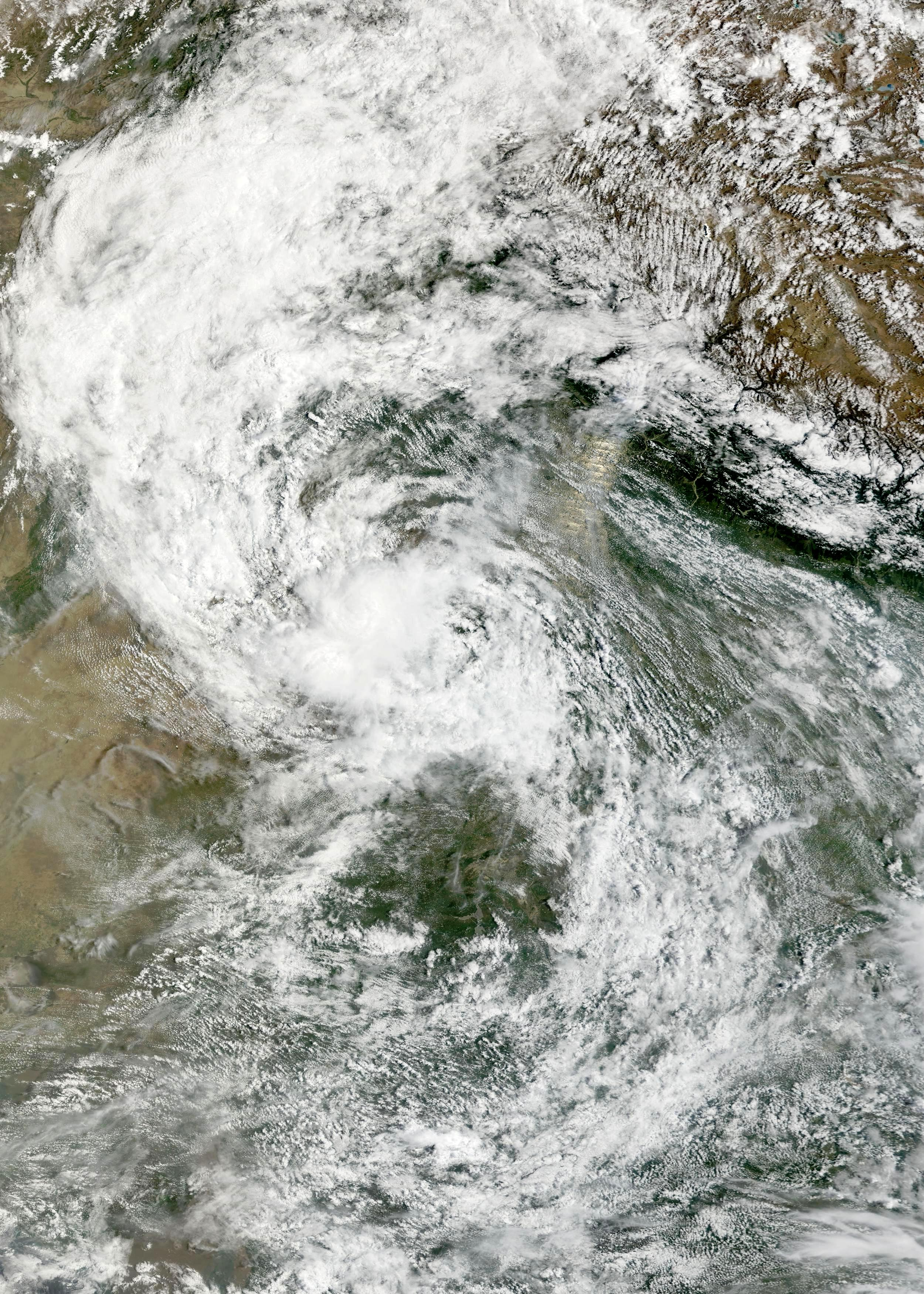
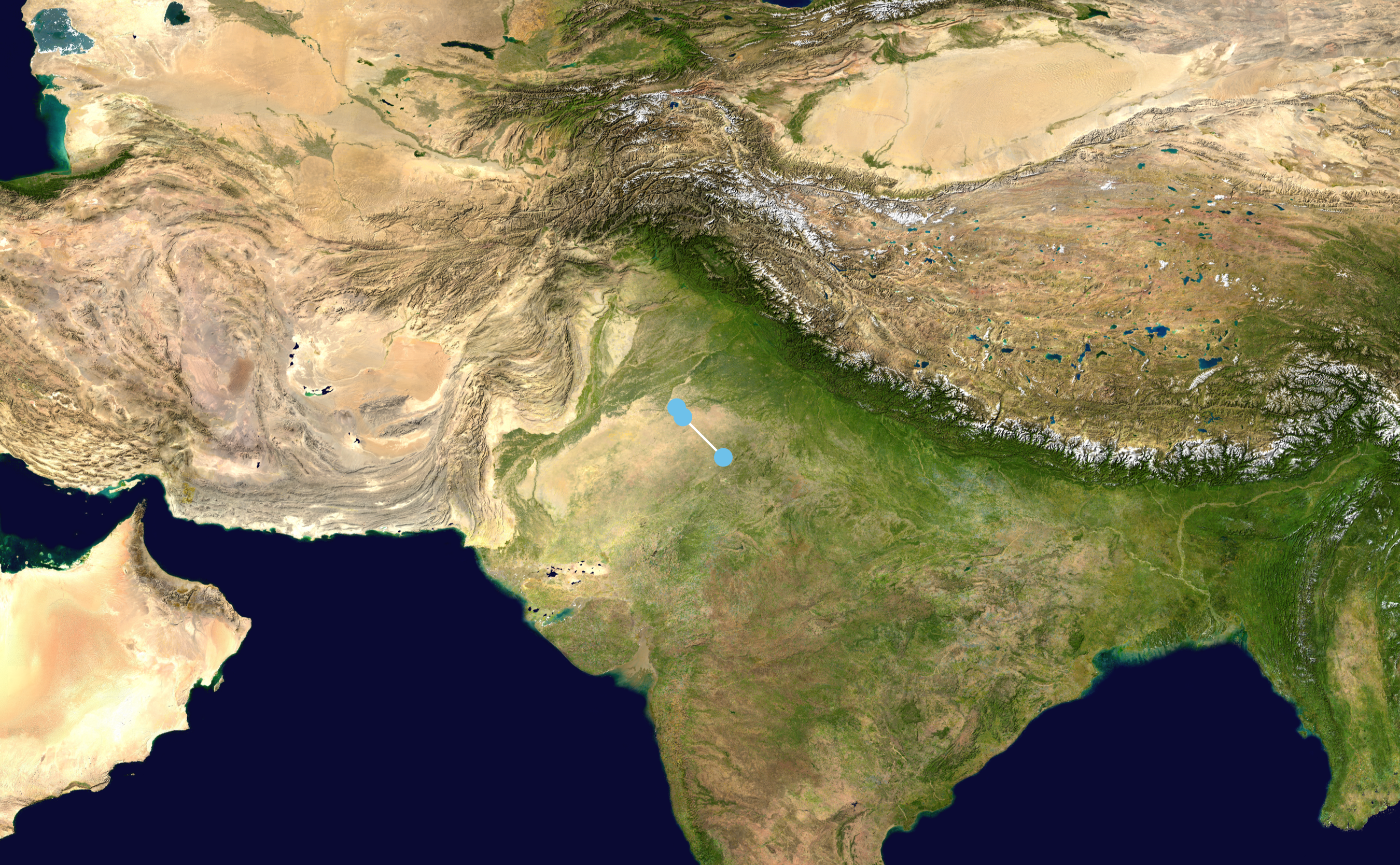
- Duration: 15 July – 16 July
- Peak intensity: 35 km/h (25 mph) (3-min); 998 hPa (mbar)

On 13 July, an upper air cyclonic circulation developed over parts of north Madhya. The IMD forecasted a low-pressure area to form under its influence over northwest Madhya during the next 24 hours.

Sometime during the late hours of 13 July or the early hours of 14 July, the forecasted low-pressure area formed over northwest Madhya, the active monsoon trough contributing to its rapid development.

On 15 July, the low pressure area became well-marked as of 08:30 IST (03:00 UTC) over parts of north Rajasthan and concentrated into a depression. The IMD forecasted the newly-formed depression to move west-northwestwards during the next 24 hours across parts of north Rajasthan. On 16 July, the depression weakened into a well-marked low over northwest Rajasthan at 05:30 IST (00:00 UTC) due to loss of moisture and topographical interaction.

The IMD issued red alerts across Rajasthan due to heavy forecasted rain. Isolated extremely heavy rainfall (over 21 cm) was forecasted by the IMD in southwest Rajasthan and north Gujarat. The highest rainfall recorded as a result of the depression was 234 mm in Nainwa of the Bundi district. 10 casualties were reported. The depression contributed to widespread flooding and financial losses. Many villages were cut off as rivers, drains, and dams overflowed. 17 people became stranded in the Banas River of Tonk, but were fortunately rescued by authorities. Flash floods across cities like Kota and Jaipur affected Rajasthan's economy, damaging roads and submerging farmlands.

=== Depression BOB 04 ===
- Depression (IMD)
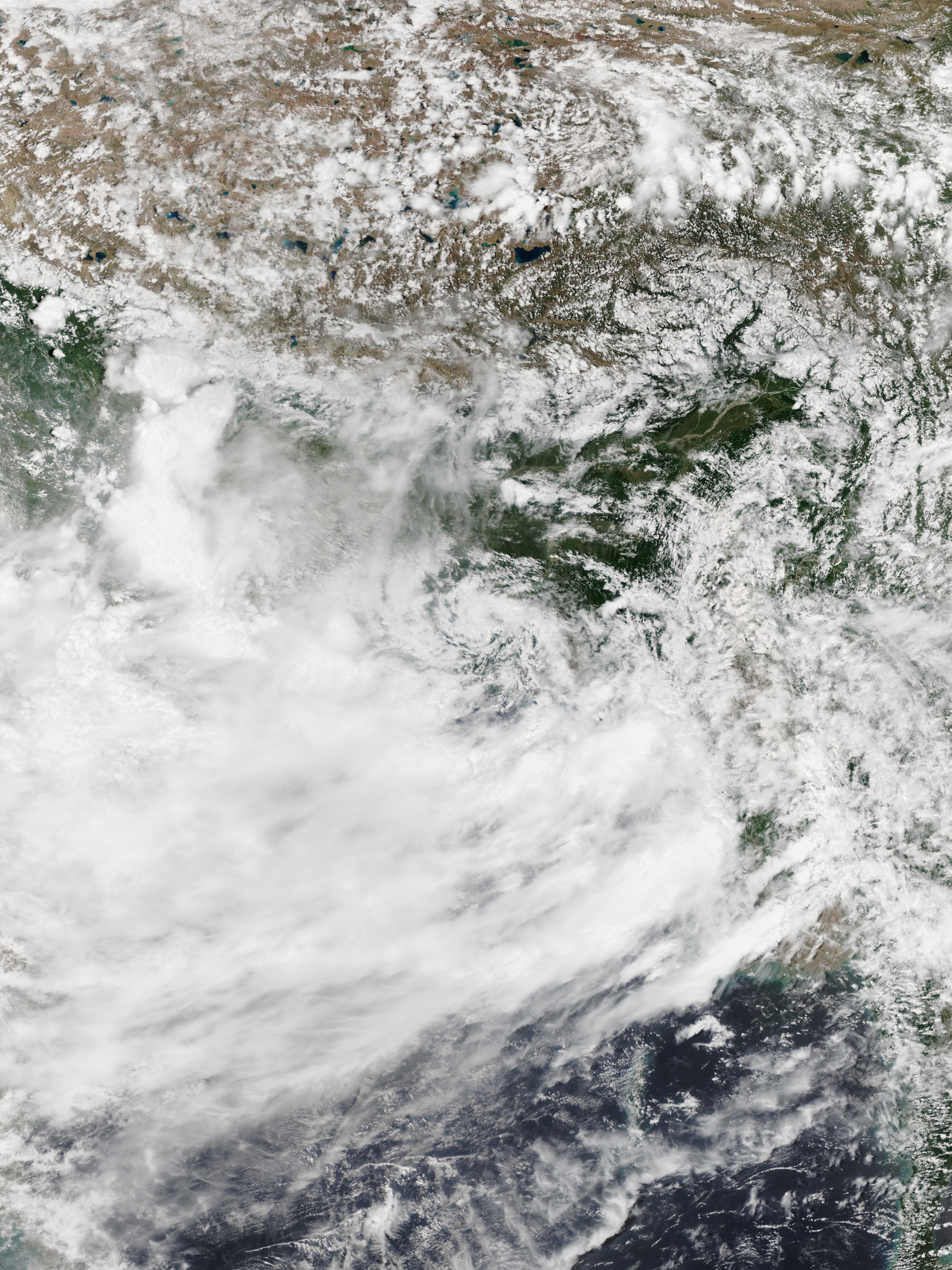
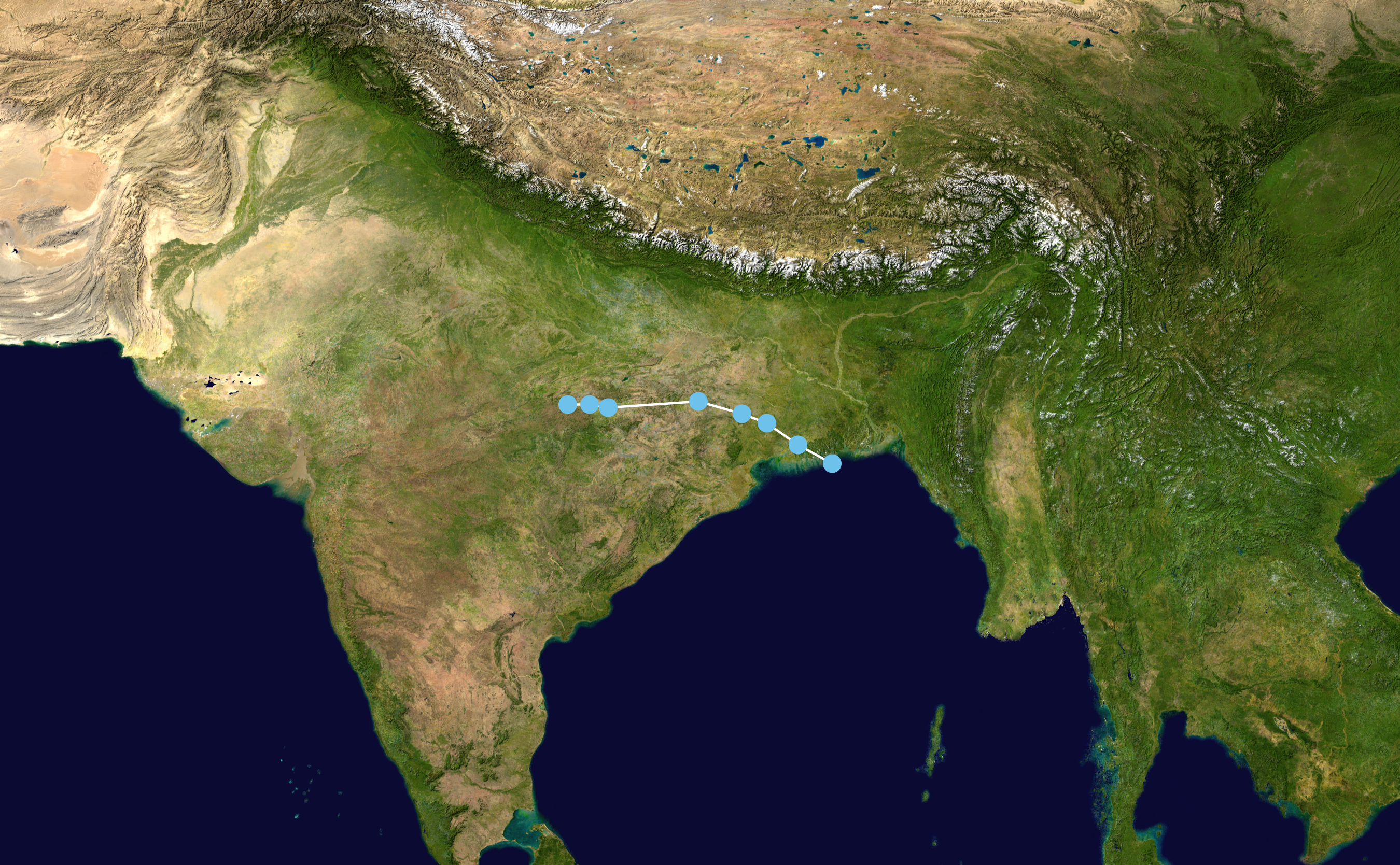
- Duration: 25 July – 27 July
- Peak intensity: 45 km/h (30 mph) (3-min); 988 hPa (mbar)

The remnants of Tropical Storm Wipha continued developing over the North Indian Ocean on 23 July. On 25 July, the low-pressure area over the Northwestern part of the Bay of Bengal concentrated into a depression by the IMD at 05:30 IST (00:00 UTC).

As a result of the depression, Pagladanga in Kolkata recorded 186 mm (7.3 in) in 15 hours from 24 July to 25 July, while Alipore recorded 120 mm (4.7 in) in 24 hours. Gusts of 50 km/h (31 mph; 27 kn) were also reported from the city. Many parts of the city were waterlogged.

=== Depression BOB 05 ===
- Depression (IMD)
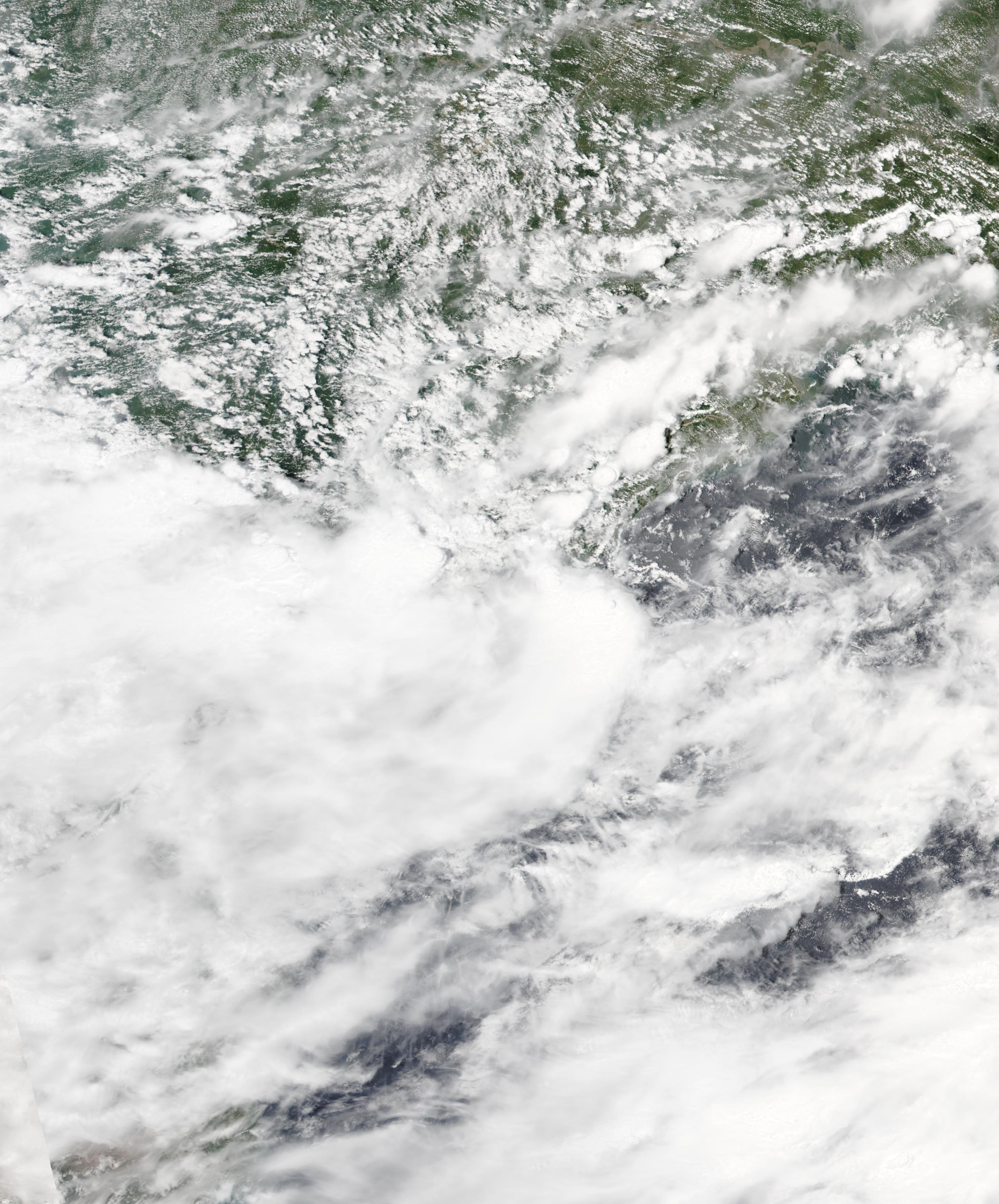
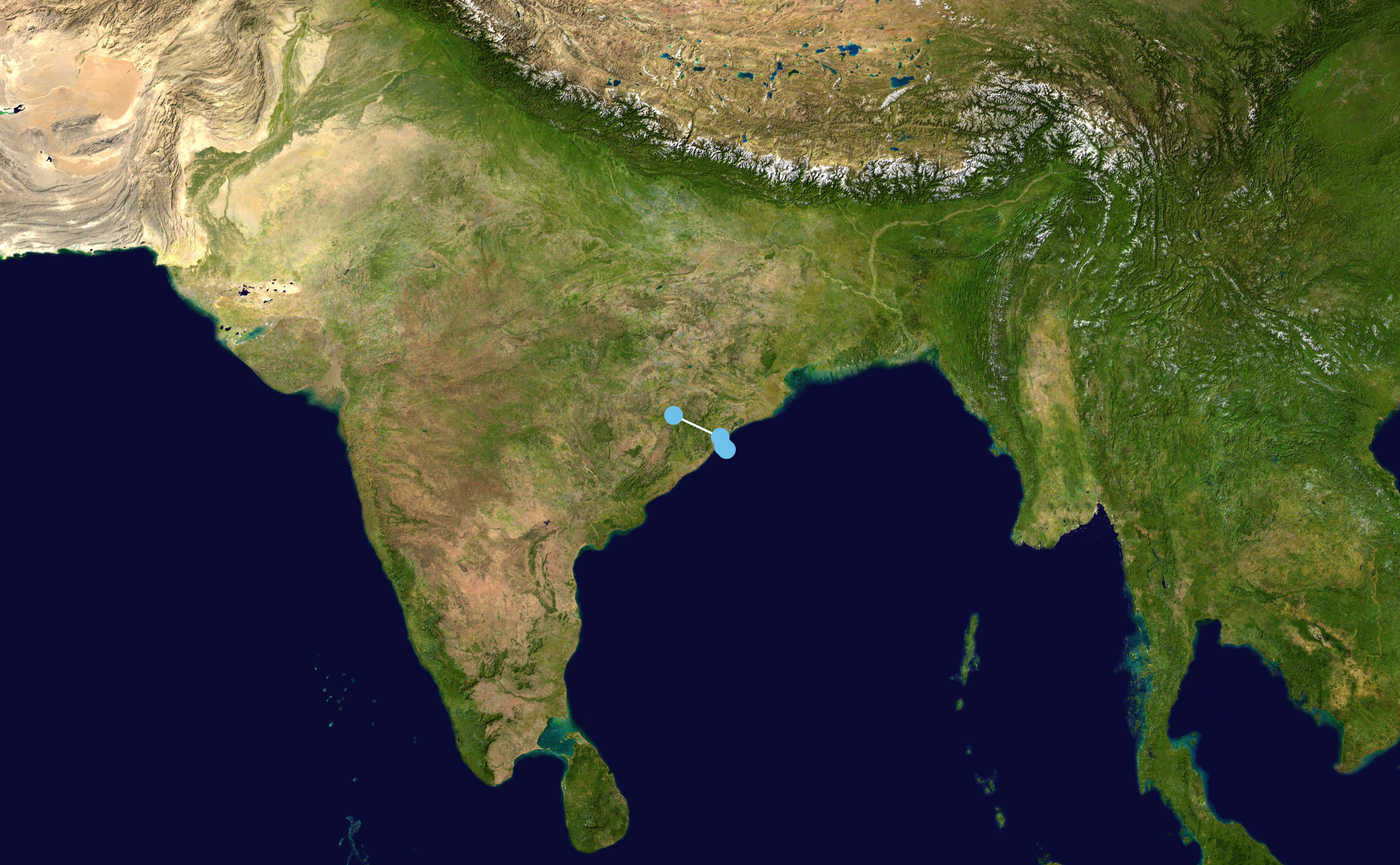
- Duration: 18 August – 19 August
- Peak intensity: 35 km/h (25 mph) (3-min); 994 hPa (mbar)

On 17 August, a low pressure area formed over the northwestern Bay of Bengal off the coasts of north Andhra and south Odisha under the influence of an upper air cyclonic circulation located over the same area as of 08:30 IST (03:00 UTC) according to the IMD.

The IMD began to track the system as it developed further, forecasting the low pressure area to concentrate into a depression. On 18 August, the low pressure area became well-marked as of 05:30 IST (00:00 UTC), persisting over the same regions. It concentrated into a depression as of 17:30 IST (12:00 UTC).

The IMD forecasted the newly-formed depression to move northwestwards and make landfall along south Odisha and north Andhra coasts around 08:30 IST (03:00 UTC) on 19 August. This prompted the IMD to issue orange and yellow rainfall alerts to districts across Odisha and Andhra Pradesh. After it moved inland, it degenerated into a well marked low the next day.

=== Deep Depression LAND 04 ===
- Deep depression (IMD)
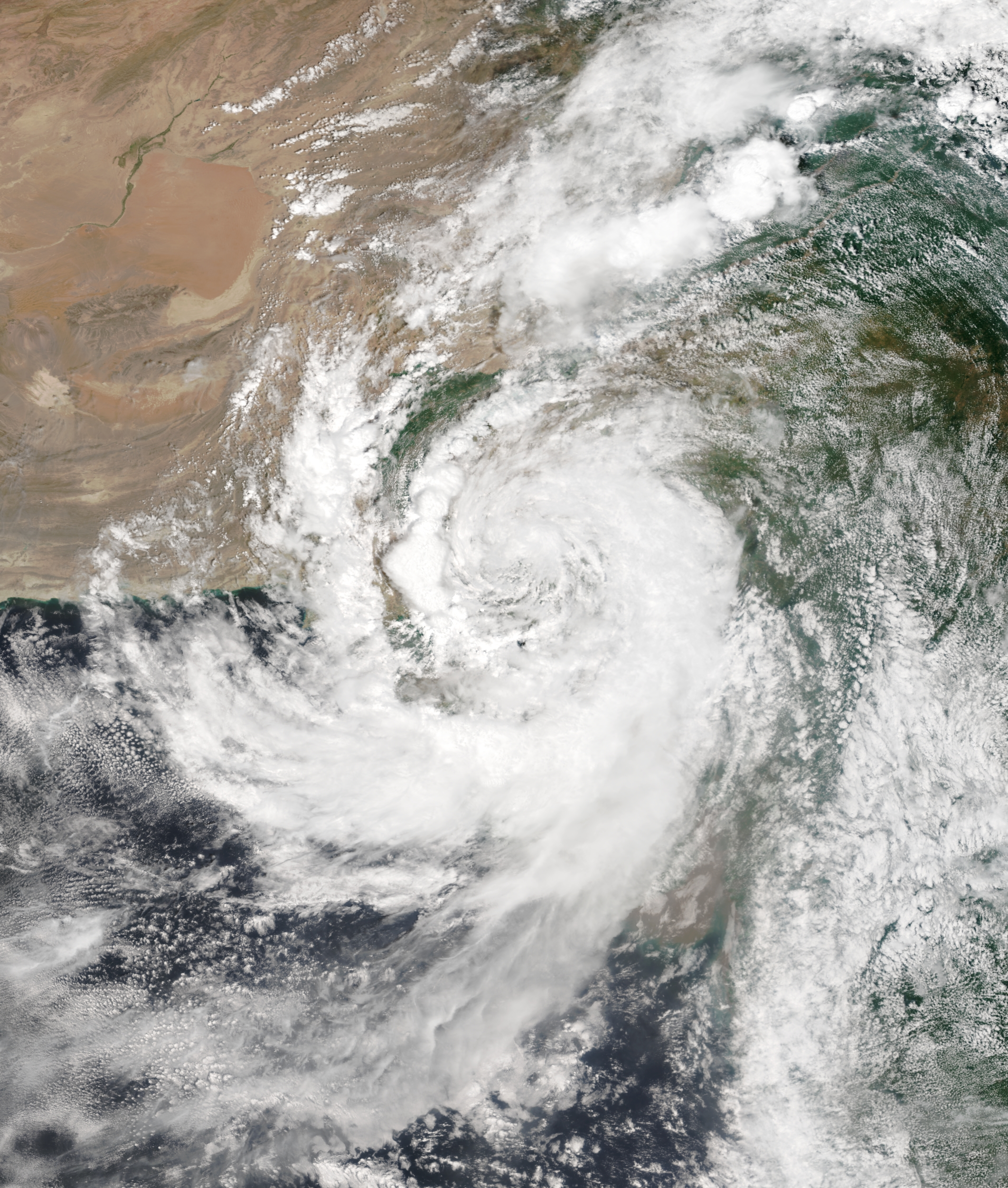
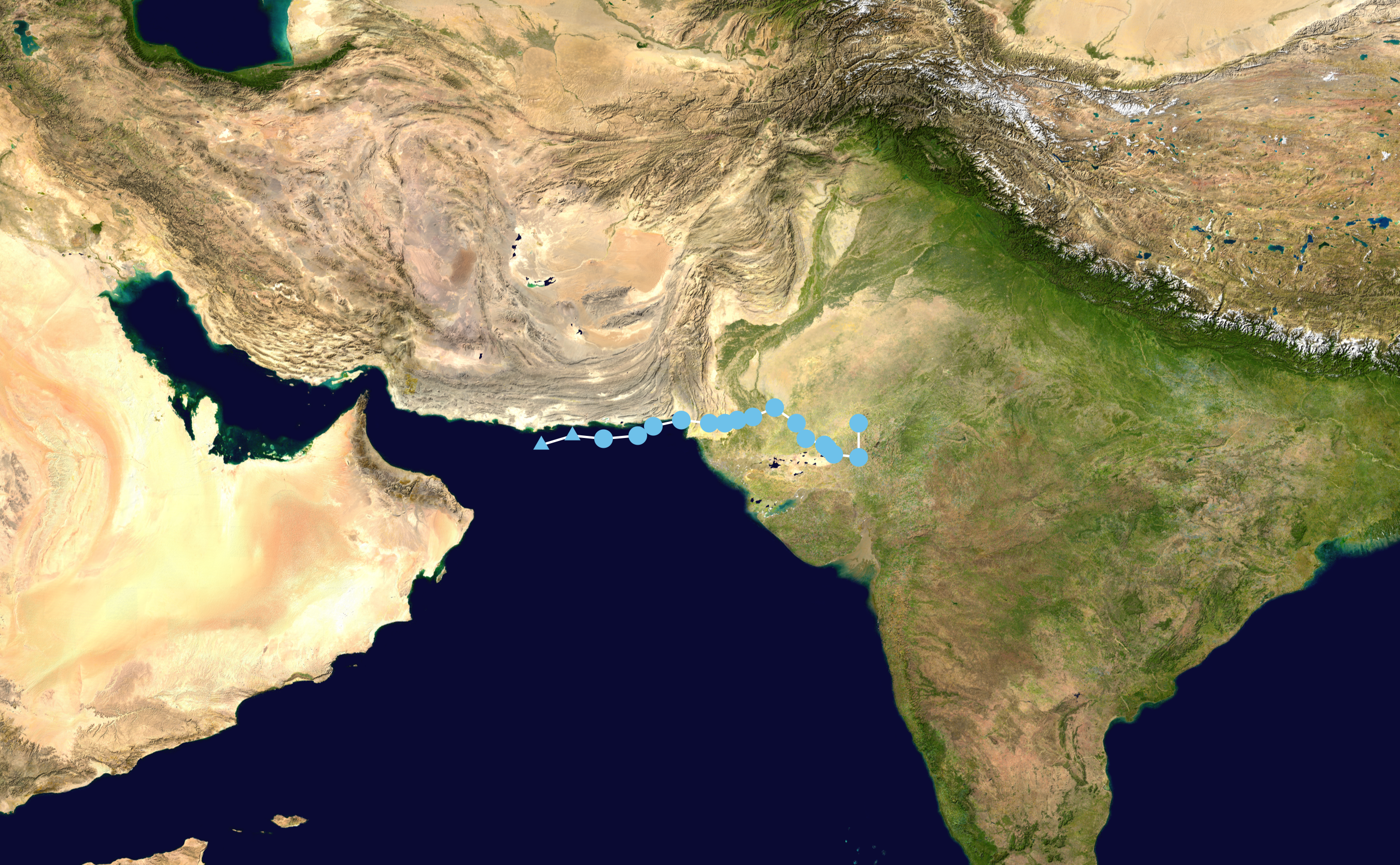
- Duration: 6 September – 11 September
- Peak intensity: 55 km/h (35 mph) (3-min); 995 hPa (mbar)

The remnants of Tropical Storm Nongfa from the South China sea in the Western Pacific basin contributed to the development of the depression. On 31 August, an upper air cyclonic circulation over the northwestern Bay of Bengal would help a low pressure to develop on 2 September. It would further develop into a well-marked low on 3 September. It then moved inland over northern Odisha on 4 September and weakened into a low pressure area over northern Chhattisgarh. Then on 5 September, it developed into a well-marked low pressure area again western Madhya Pradesh. At 23:30 IST on 6 September, the low further developed into a depression over southwestern Rajasthan. The depression continued to intensify and became a deep depression at 11:30 IST on 7 September over northern Gujarat. The deep depression moved into southeastern Pakistan the next day. It then weakened to a depression at 23:30 IST on 9 September. On 10 September, it would move offshore into the northeastern Arabian Sea. The system would further weaken to a well-marked low the next day over the northwestern Arabian Sea.

=== Depression BOB 06 ===
- Depression (IMD)
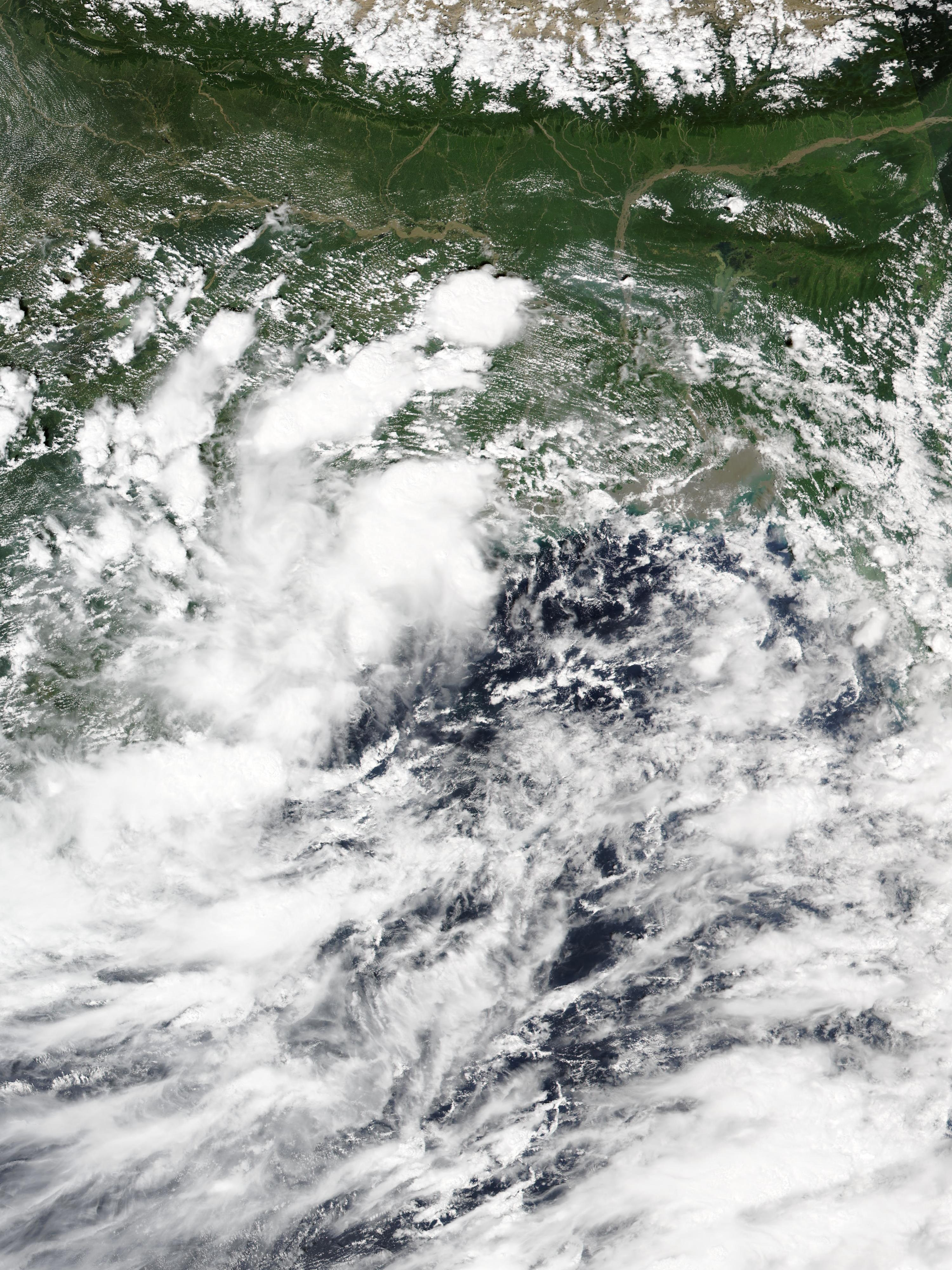
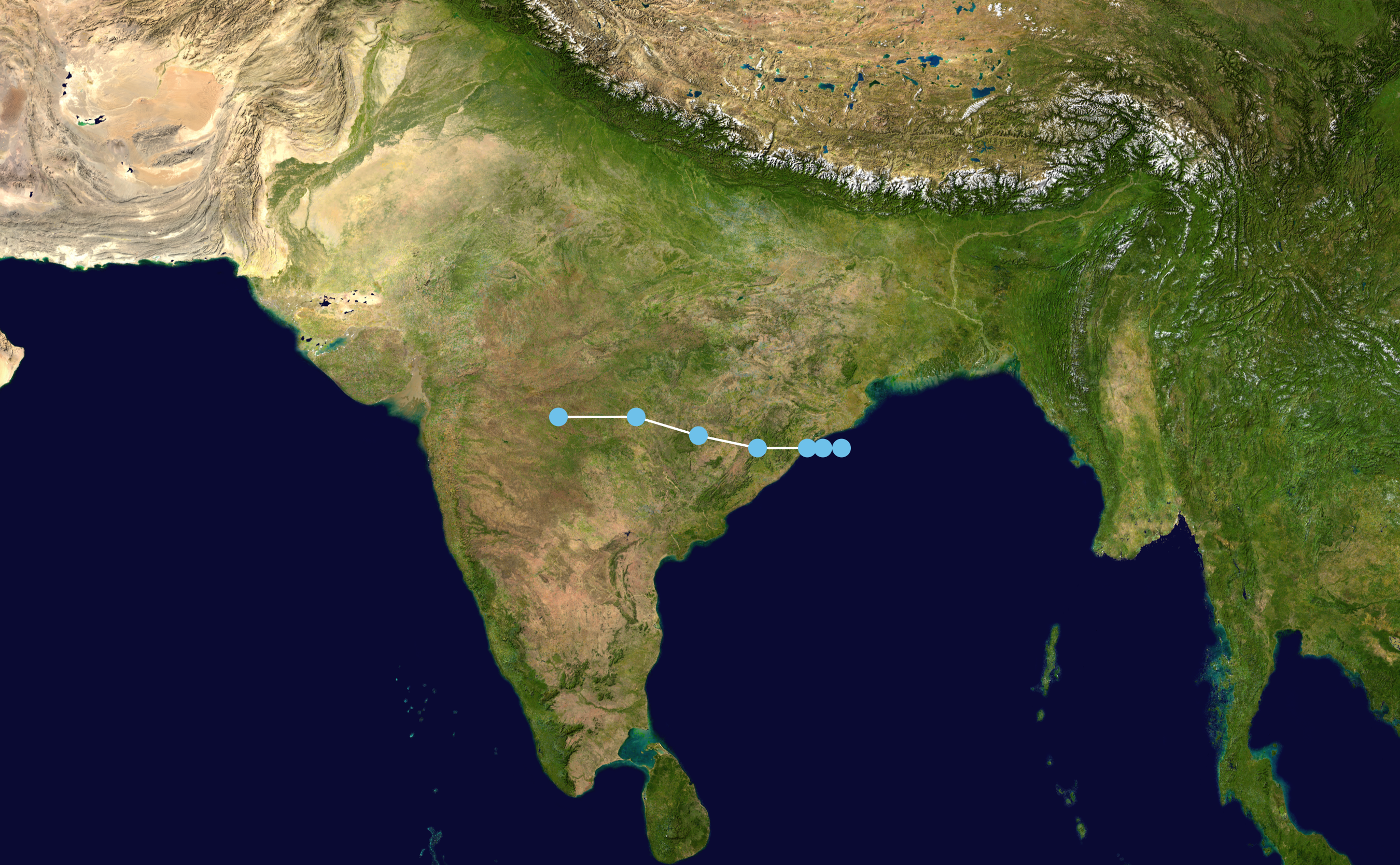
- Duration: 26 September – 28 September
- Peak intensity: 45 km/h (30 mph) (3-min); 996 hPa (mbar)

On 21 September an upper air cyclonic circulation over the northeast Bay of Bengal developed into a low pressure on 22 September. It would develop into a well-marked low on 26 September. By 2:15 IST on 27 September, it would further develop into a depression. It then crossed the coast of South Odisha at 4:30 IST and moved inland. At 8:30 IST on 28 September the system weakened to a well-marked low-pressure area over West Vidarbha. The well-marked low moved over the Gulf of Cambay and eventually emerged over the Arabian Sea, where it would develop into Cyclone Shakhti.

The Harsul circle in Chhatrapati Sambhajinagar recorded 196 mm of rainfall over 24 hours. Over 11,500 were evacuated in Marathwada. The heavy rainfall and flooding led to the deaths of two in Dharashiv.

=== Deep Depression BOB 07 ===
- Deep depression (IMD)
- Tropical storm (SSHWS)
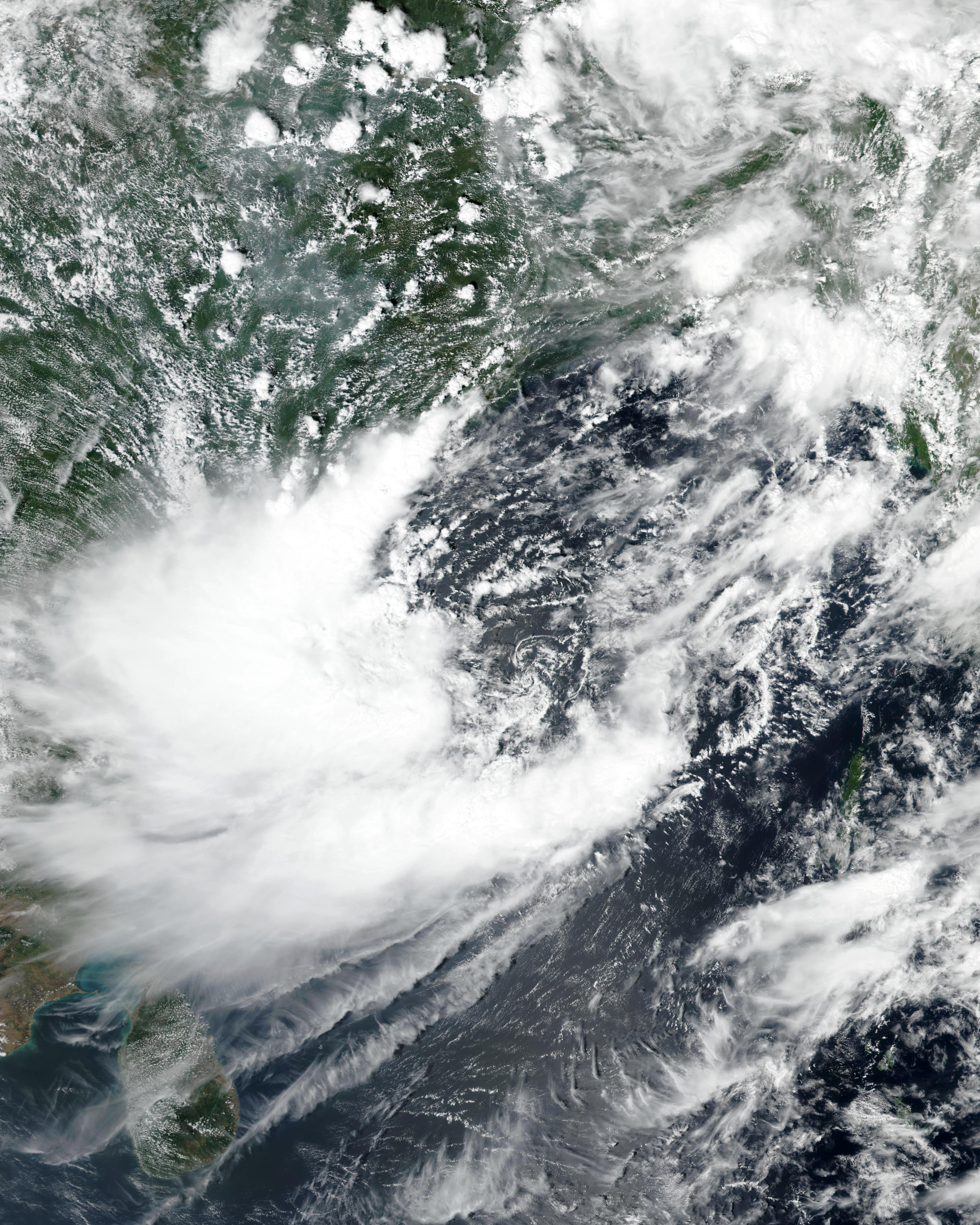
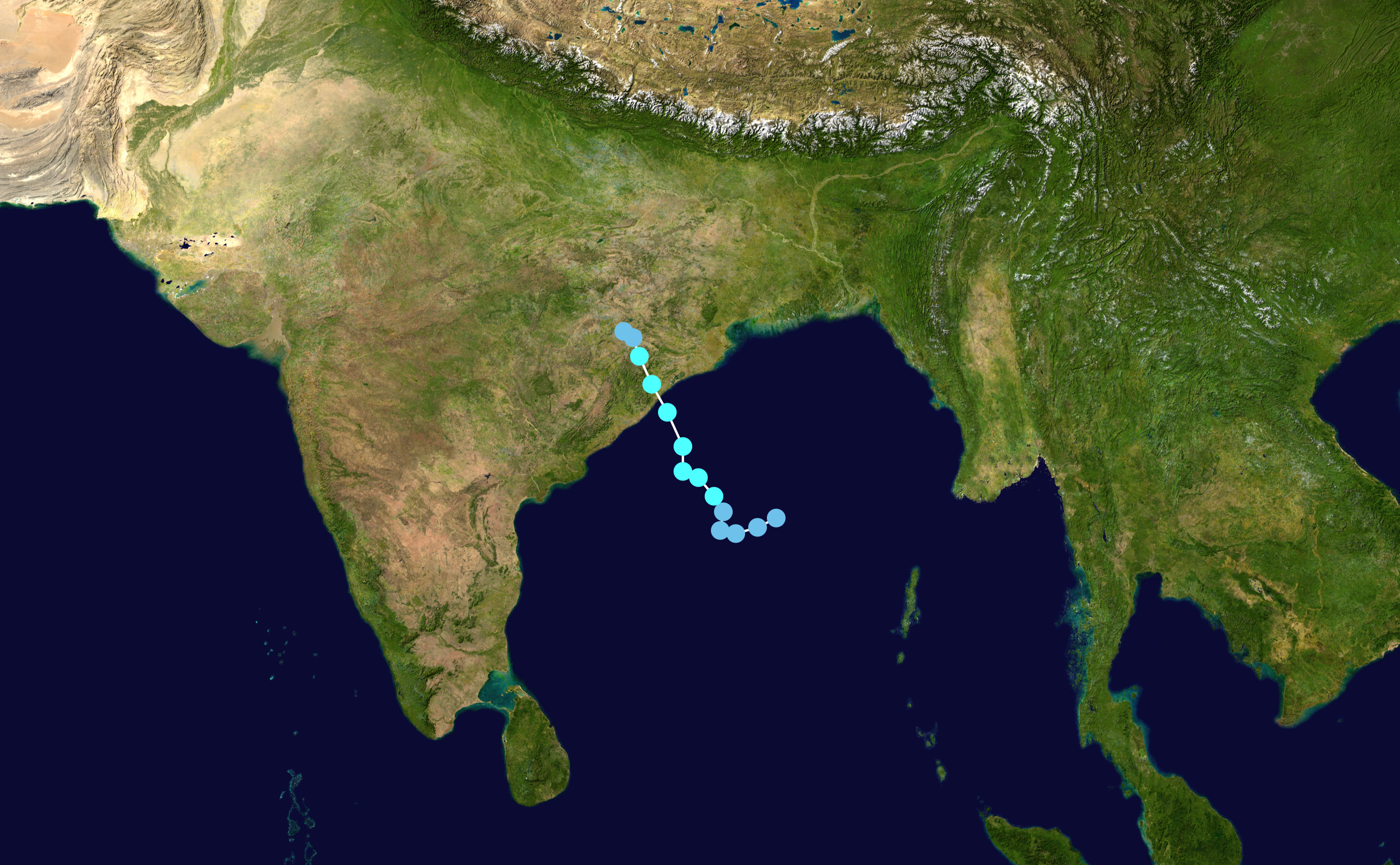
- Duration: 1 October – 3 October
- Peak intensity: 55 km/h (35 mph) (3-min); 995 hPa (mbar)

On 30 September, an upper air cyclonic circulation formed over the east-central Bay of Bengal at 1430 IST. Under its influence, a low pressure area formed over the west-central Bay of Bengal at 1730 IST. The next day, 1 October, at 05:30 IST, it became well marked over the same region. By 11:30 IST, it had concentrated into a depression, moving north-northwestwards about 400 km (250 mi) east-southeast of Vishakhapatnam. The system moved in the same direction at a speed of 10 km/h (6.2 mph) and intensified into a deep depression by 23:30 IST, and was about 300 km (190 mi) east-southeast of Vishakhapatnam. BOB 07 triggered flooding and landslides, killing 61 in Nepal, 48 in West Bengal, Odisha, and Andhra Pradesh, India, and another in Wangdue Phodrang, Bhutan, with many more missing, including two in Bhutan. At least 24 of the deaths in West Bengal occurred in the Darjeeling hills area. BOB 07 produced a rare blizzard that impacted Nepal, causing the death of a climber on Mera Peak. On October 10, a joint report by Nepal's Ministry of Physical Infrastructure Development and the Ministry of Energy, Drinking Water and Irrigation of Koshi Province stated that the two-day disaster caused over Rs2.06 billion ($14.4 million USD) in damage to public infrastructure, including losses of more than Rs1.98 billion to bridges and roads. On 4 November, the District Administration Office reported that floods and landslides on October 4 and 5 caused property damage of over Rs11.81 billion ($83 million USD) and damaged bridges, buildings, and agriculture and livestock sectors.

=== Severe Cyclonic Storm Shakhti ===
- Severe cyclonic storm (IMD)
- Category 1 tropical cyclone (SSHWS)
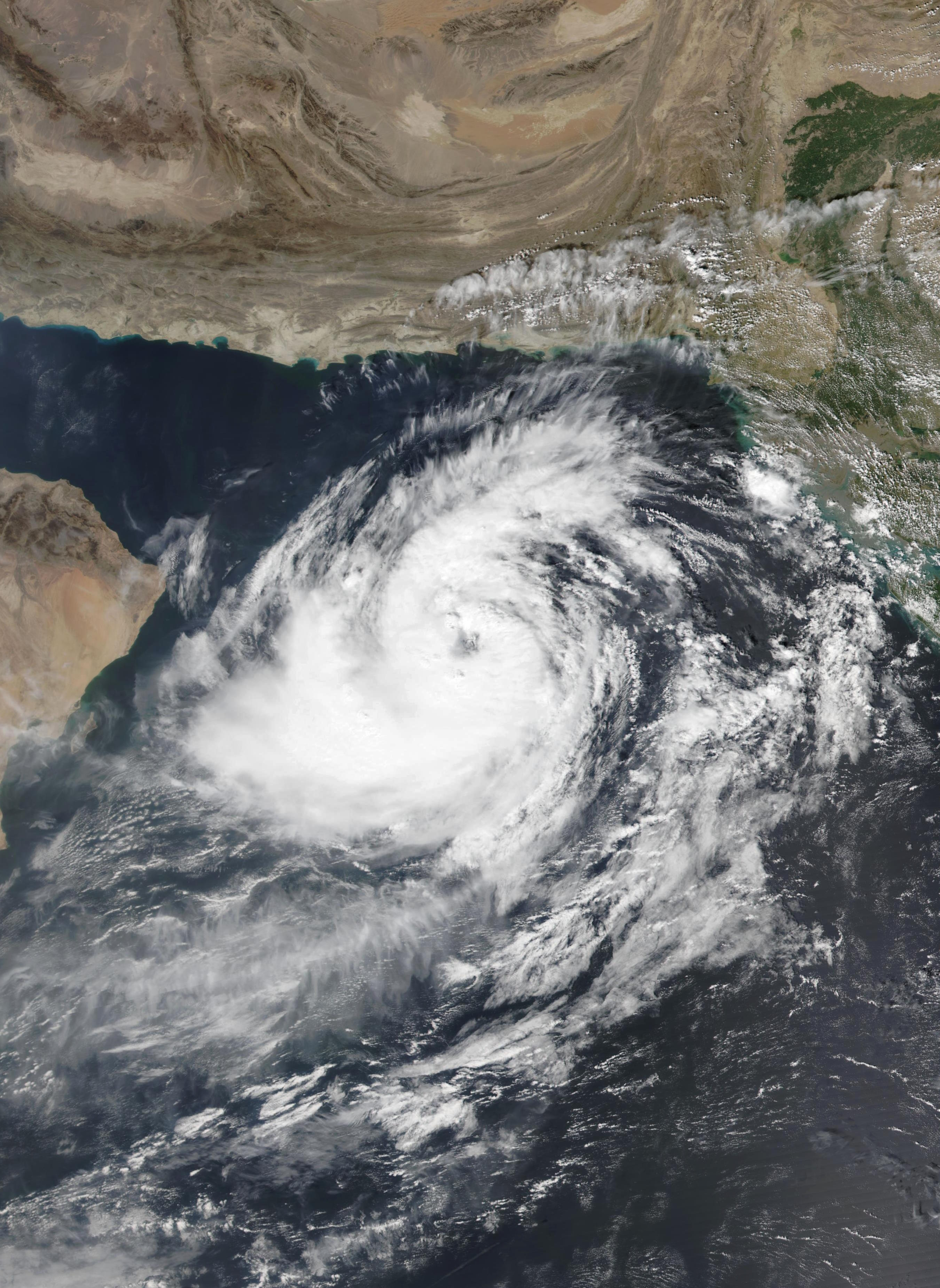
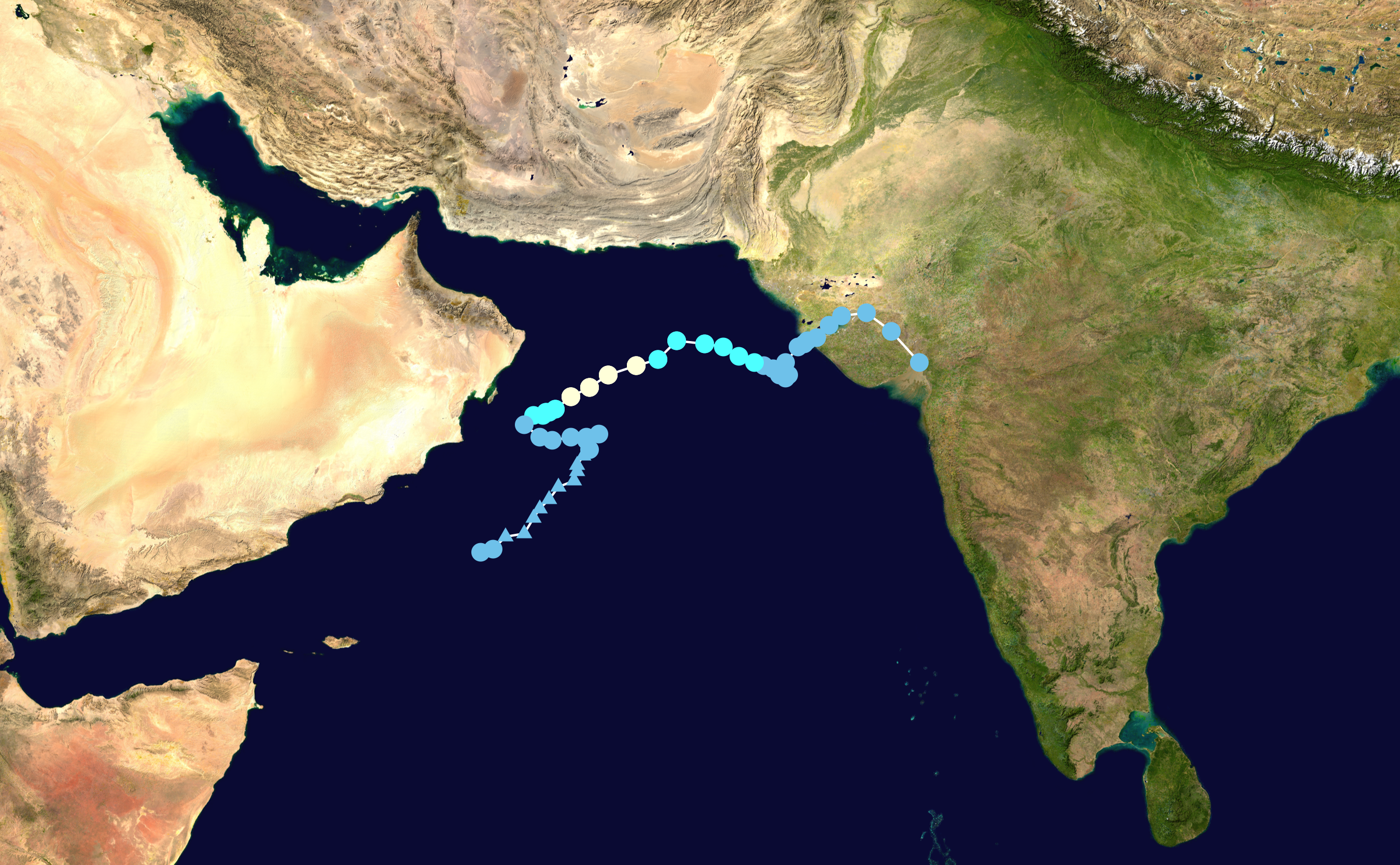
- Duration: 1 October – 7 October
- Peak intensity: 110 km/h (70 mph) (3-min); 987 hPa (mbar)

Cyclone Shakhti originated from a well-marked area of low pressure, associated with the remnants of BOB 06, at the north-east Arabian Sea on 30 September 2025. By 1 October, the system developed into a depression due to favourable conditions such as the mid-level wind shear being low to moderate (5–10 knots [5.8–11.5 mph]) and warm sea surface temperatures (28–29 °C [82–84 °F]). These suitable conditions remained, causing the system to intensify into a deep depression at 23:30 IST on 2 October and to intensify into a Cyclonic Storm named Shakhti on 3 October 11:30 IST. (Note: The name Shakhti (Sinhala: ශක්ති, [ʃakti]) was contributed by Sri Lanka and means "strength, power" in Sinhala.) Shakhti moved west-southwestward due to prevailing east-northeasterlies in the middle-upper tropospheric levels, with cyclone-force winds. On 7 October 2025, Shakhti dissipated off the coast of Oman. The remnants persisted for a time, sporadically generating convective bursts throughout the next few days.

=== Depression ARB 03 ===
- Depression (IMD)
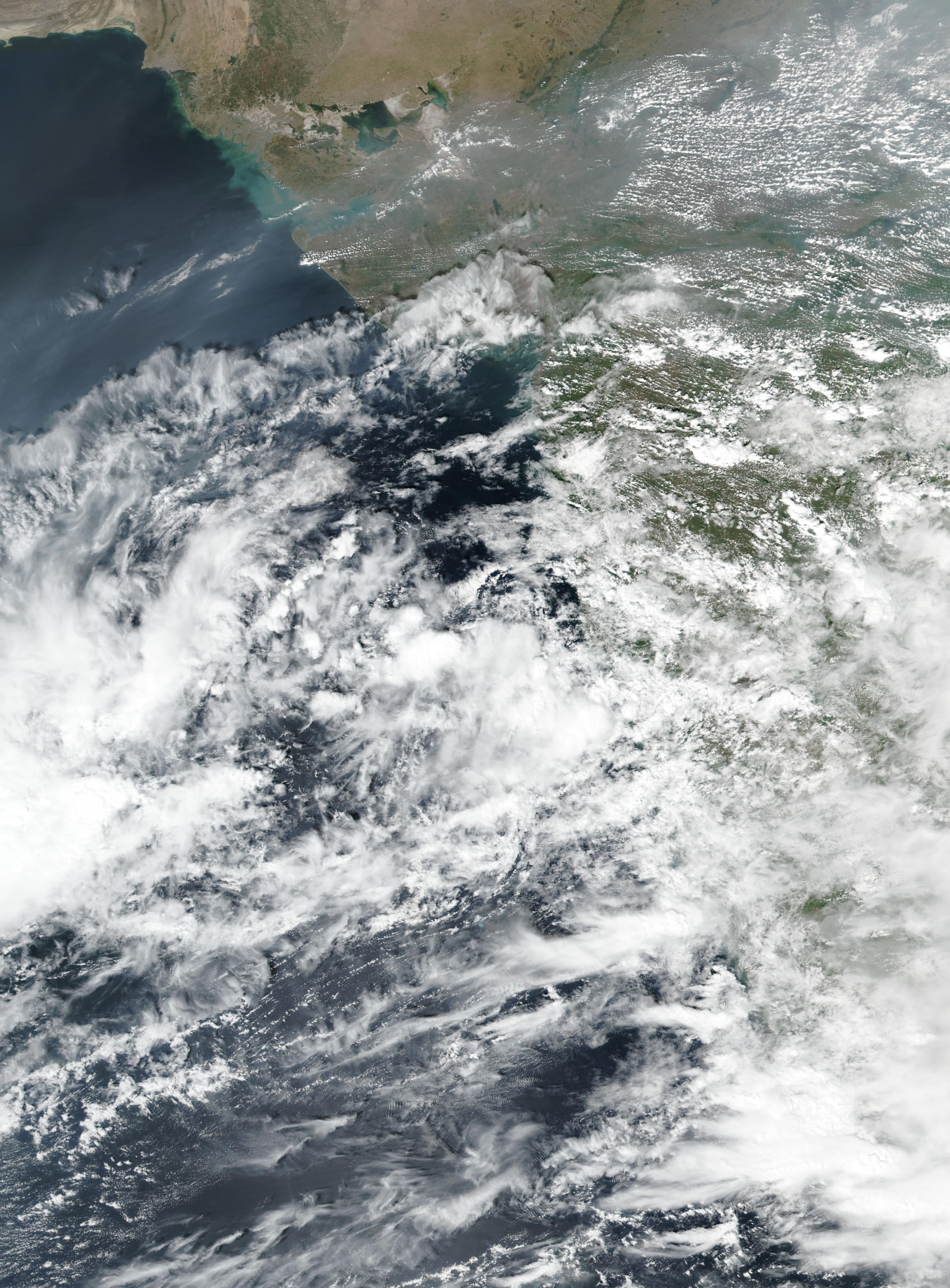
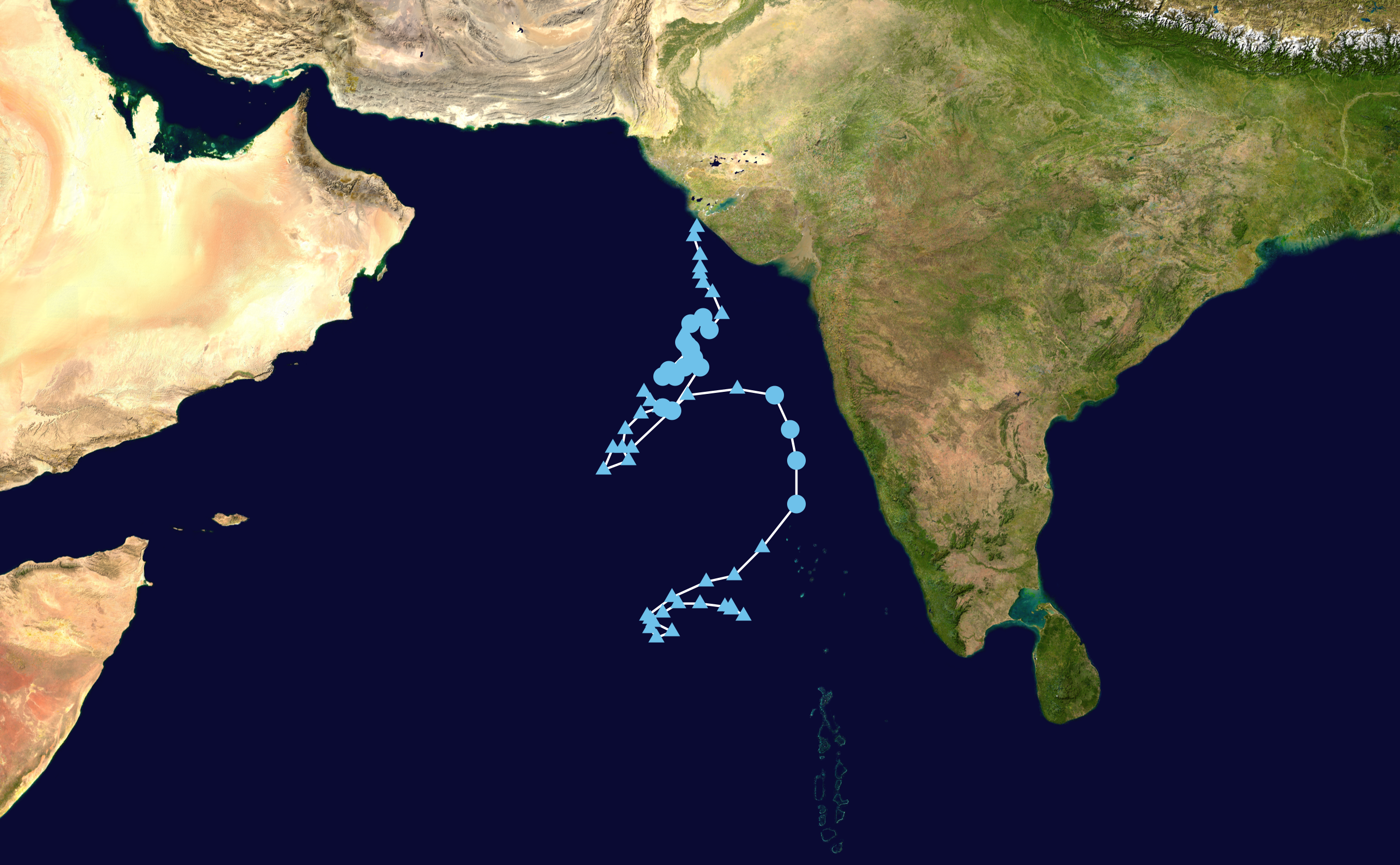
- Duration: 22 October – 1 November
- Peak intensity: 45 km/h (30 mph) (3-min); 1000 hPa (mbar)

The system brought rainfall in South Gujarat and Saurashtra regions, while mild to moderate rain in Central Gujarat and tribal areas of Gujarat on 25–30 October. It also brought rains in Mumbai and adjoining region. The rains damaged crops covering 42 lakh hectare of farmland across 16,000 villages in Gujarat. These accounted for 42% of the 99.77 lakh hectares of farmland in the state. The government of Gujarat announced approximately ₹10,000 crore (US$1.1 billion) relief package. It also announced the procurement of groundnut, maize, pigeon pea, and soybean, worth approximately ₹15,000 crore (US$1.6 billion), at minimum support prices from farmers.

=== Severe Cyclonic Storm Montha ===
- Severe cyclonic storm (IMD)
- Tropical storm (SSHWS)
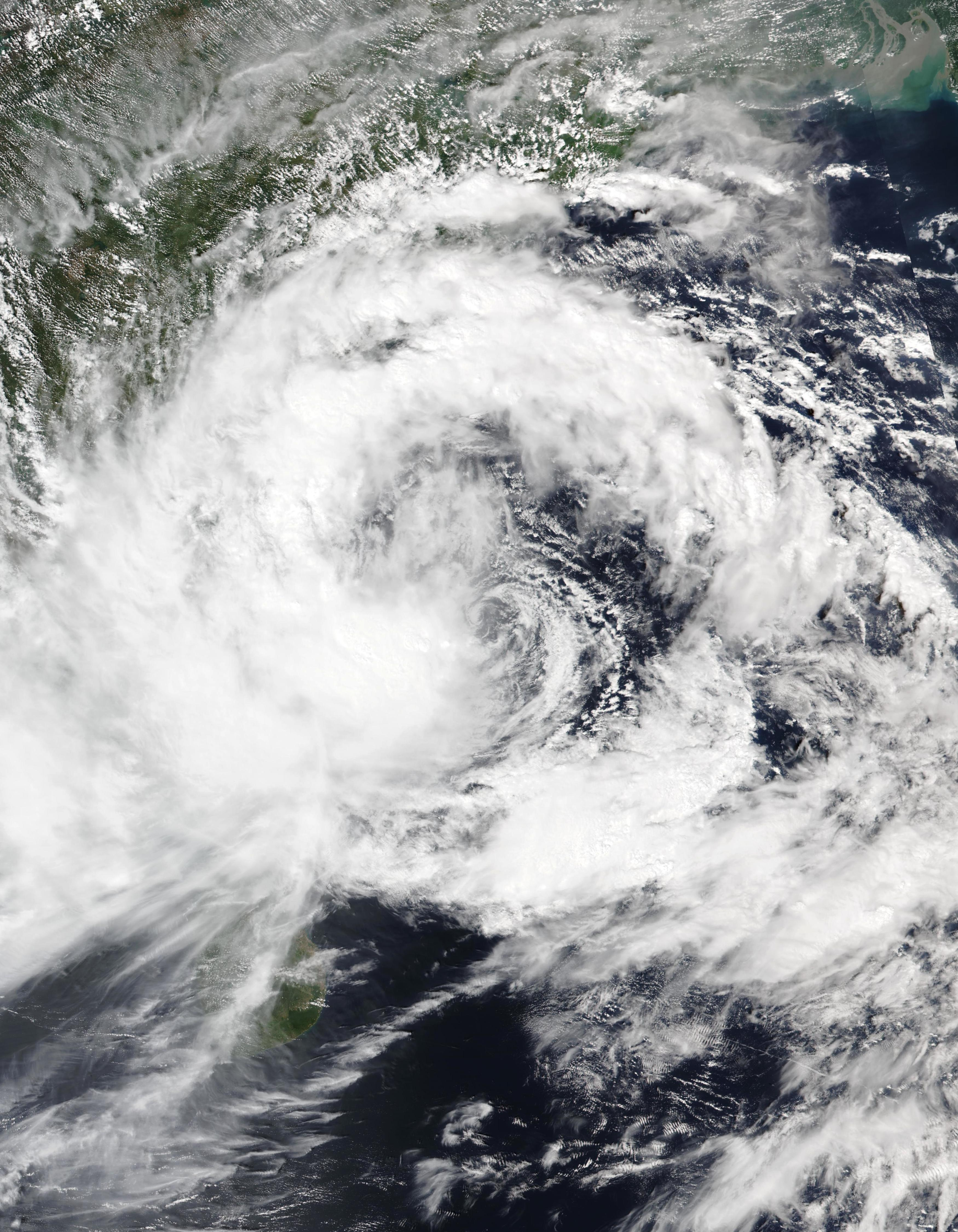
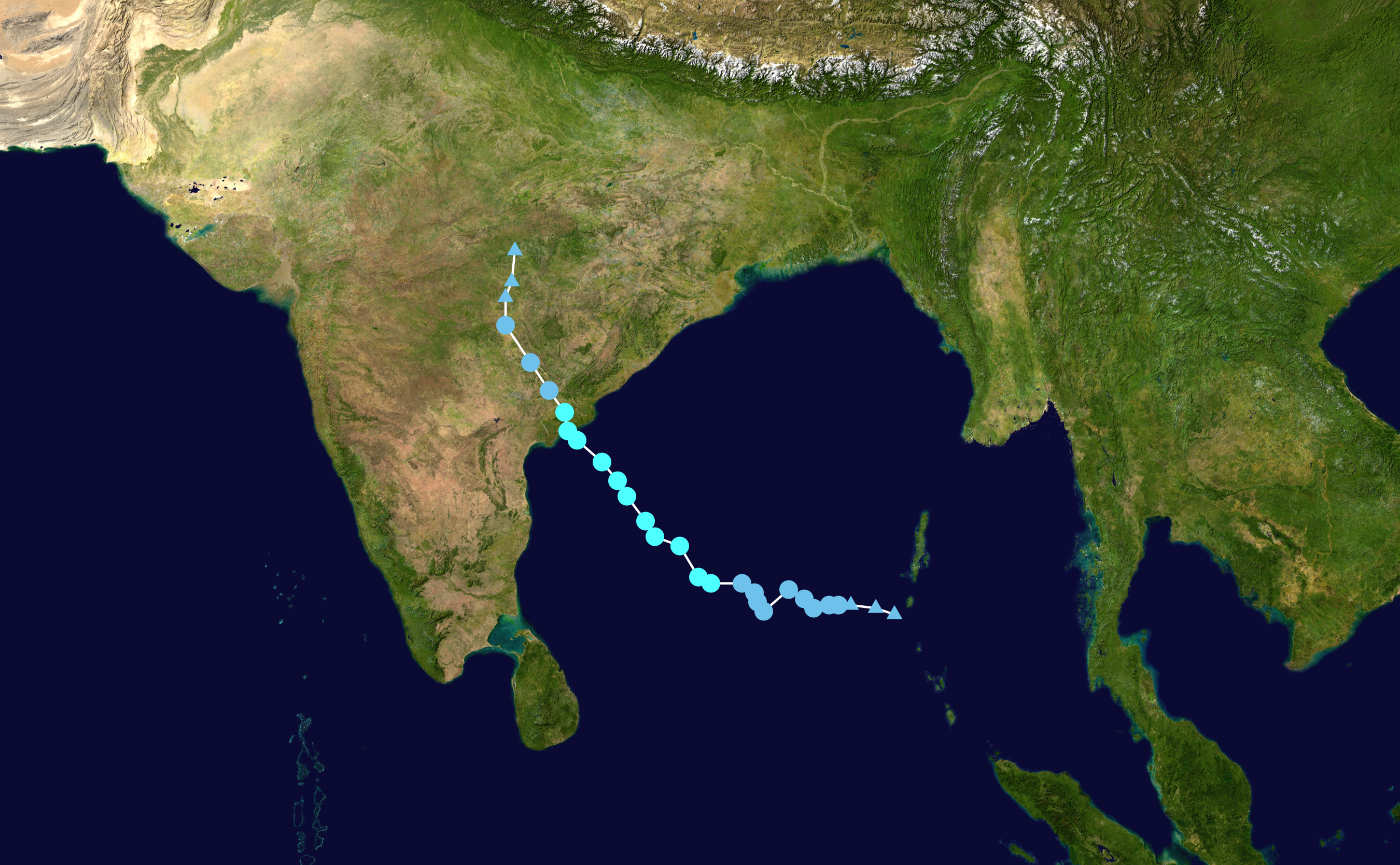
- Duration: 25 October – 30 October
- Peak intensity: 95 km/h (60 mph) (3-min); 988 hPa (mbar)

On 26 October 2025, a deep depression was recognized by the IMD to the east of the Andaman Islands. The JTWC also started tracking the system, giving it a high chance of formation. At 17:30 hours the same day, it intensified into a tropical storm, according to JTWC. The storm later made landfall near Narasapuram on the evening hours of 28th October as Severe Cyclonic Storm Montha. (Note: The name Montha (Thai: มณฑา, [mon˧ tʰaː˧]) was contributed by Thailand and refers to the egg magnolia (Magnolia liliifera) in Thai.) In its passage into Andhra Pradesh and Telangana, Montha caused torrential rainfall, severe flooding, and toppled trees. At least six were killed in Telangana, with two each in Ranga Reddy and Warangal districts and one each in Mahabubabad and Suryapet. Three people were killed in Andhra Pradesh. Authorities reported that Montha caused about 53 billion rupees ($603 million USD) in damages. State officials increased the estimated damages to $720 million on 10 November.

=== Cyclonic Storm Senyar ===
- Cyclonic storm (IMD)
- Tropical storm (SSHWS)
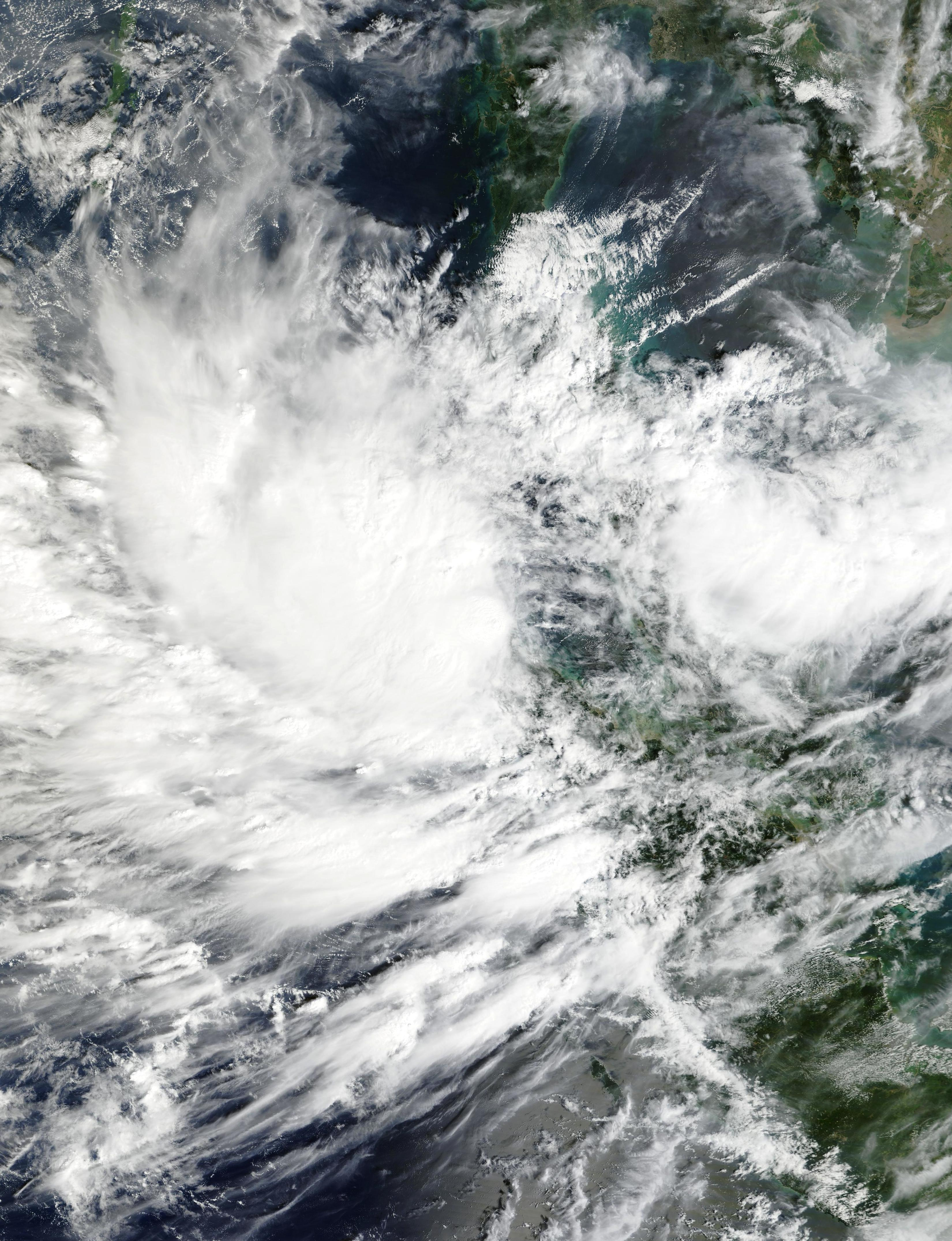
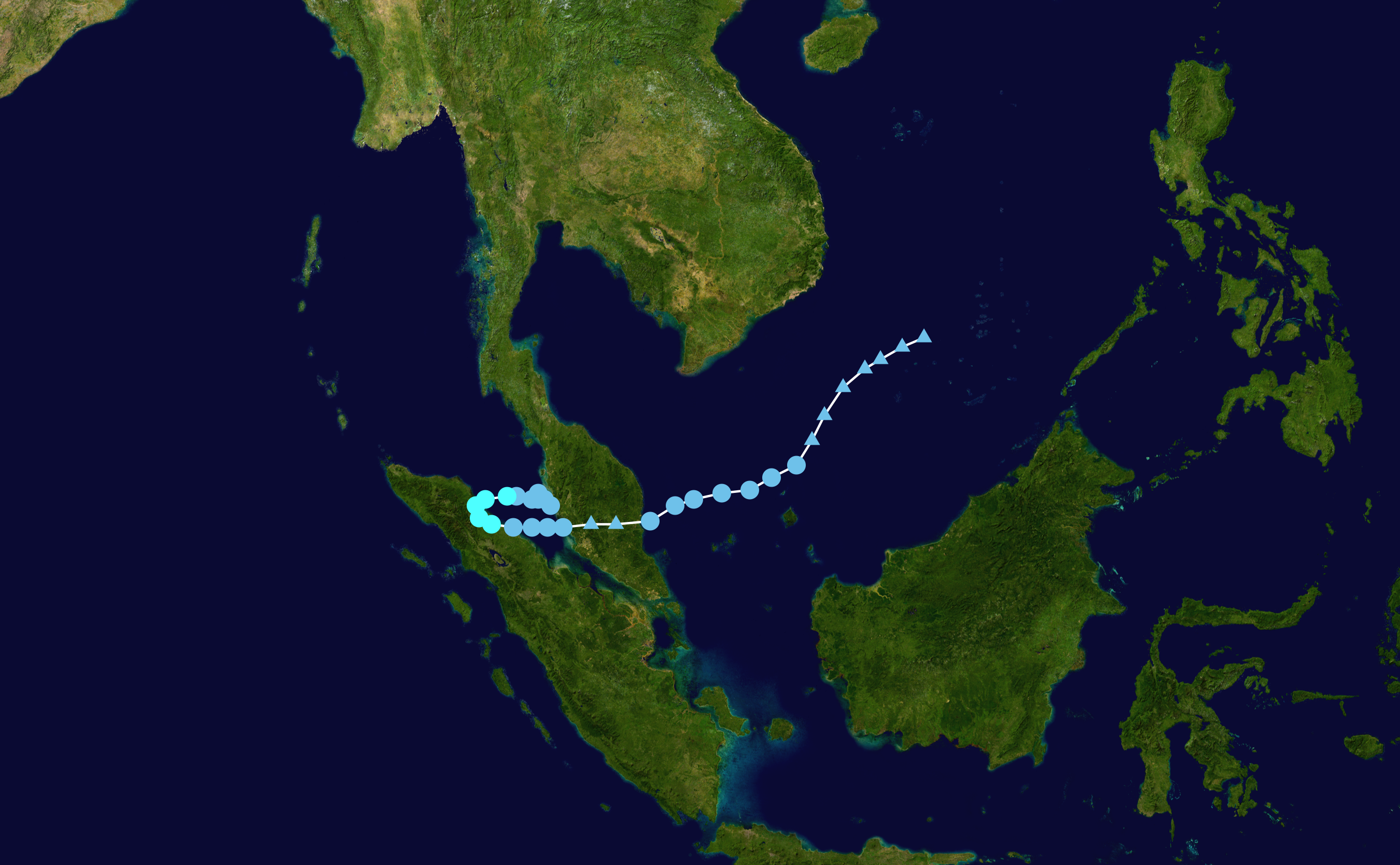
- Duration: 25 November – 27 November (Exited basin)
- Peak intensity: 75 km/h (45 mph) (3-min); 999 hPa (mbar)

On 21 November, the Joint Typhoon Warning Center marked a tropical disturbance in the Strait of Malacca as Invest 95B as it moved little over the next few days. Four days later, the IMD began monitoring the system, designating it as Depression BOB 09. The JTWC followed suit the same day, issuing a Tropical Cyclone Formation Alert on the system, giving the designation 04B. Later that same day it would make landfall on Indonesia's Sumatra. The system tracked along the coast of Sumatra and weakened, with a small low-level circulation center. On 26 November, the system was renamed Cyclonic Storm Senyar as it recurved back into the Strait of Malacca the next day, (Note: The name Senyar (Arabic: سنيار, [senjaːr]) was contributed by the United Arab Emirates and refers to groups of sailing ships departing in Arabic.) with Senyar weakening into a deep depression as it moved east.

The system brought heavy landfall to the Malay Peninsula. Flooding in Southern Thailand killed 33 people and affected 2.7 million others, with the worst effects seen in Hat Yai, where floodwaters reached up to 2 m (6.6 ft) deep, stranding 7,000 foreign tourists as a result. Flooding also occurred in Peninsular Malaysia, where 21,000 people were evacuated across 10 states in Malaysia.

As the system traversed through the Strait of Malacca, it also brought widespread flash flood and landslides to the Indonesian island of Sumatra affecting 52 cities and regencies in 3 provinces: Aceh, North Sumatra, and West Sumatra. A total of 3.3 million people were affected, with at least 1.5 million displaced. The Indonesian Government reported at least 1,201 deaths and 142 missing persons in the 3 affected provinces.

=== Cyclonic Storm Ditwah ===
- Cyclonic storm (IMD)
- Tropical storm (SSHWS)
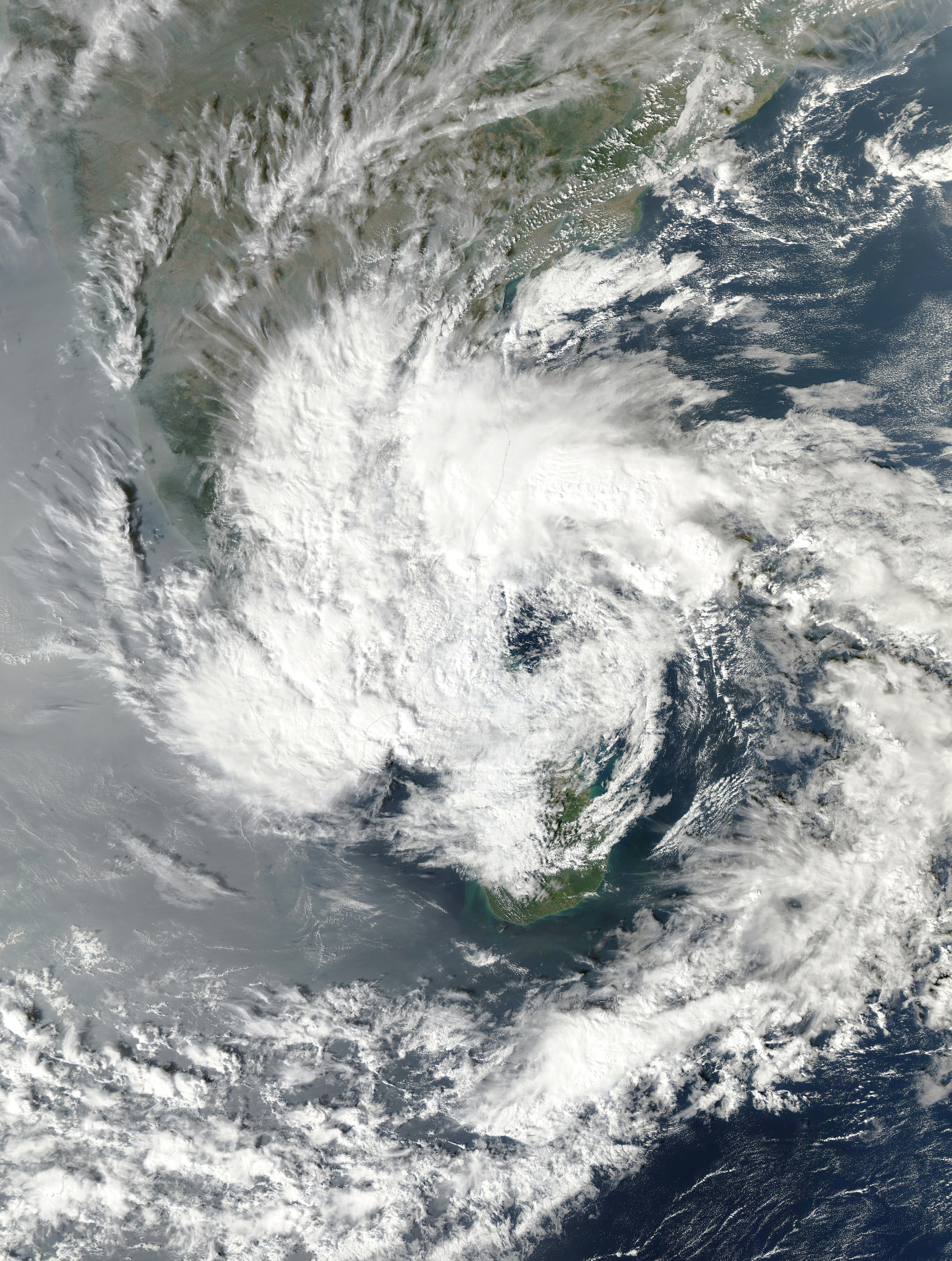
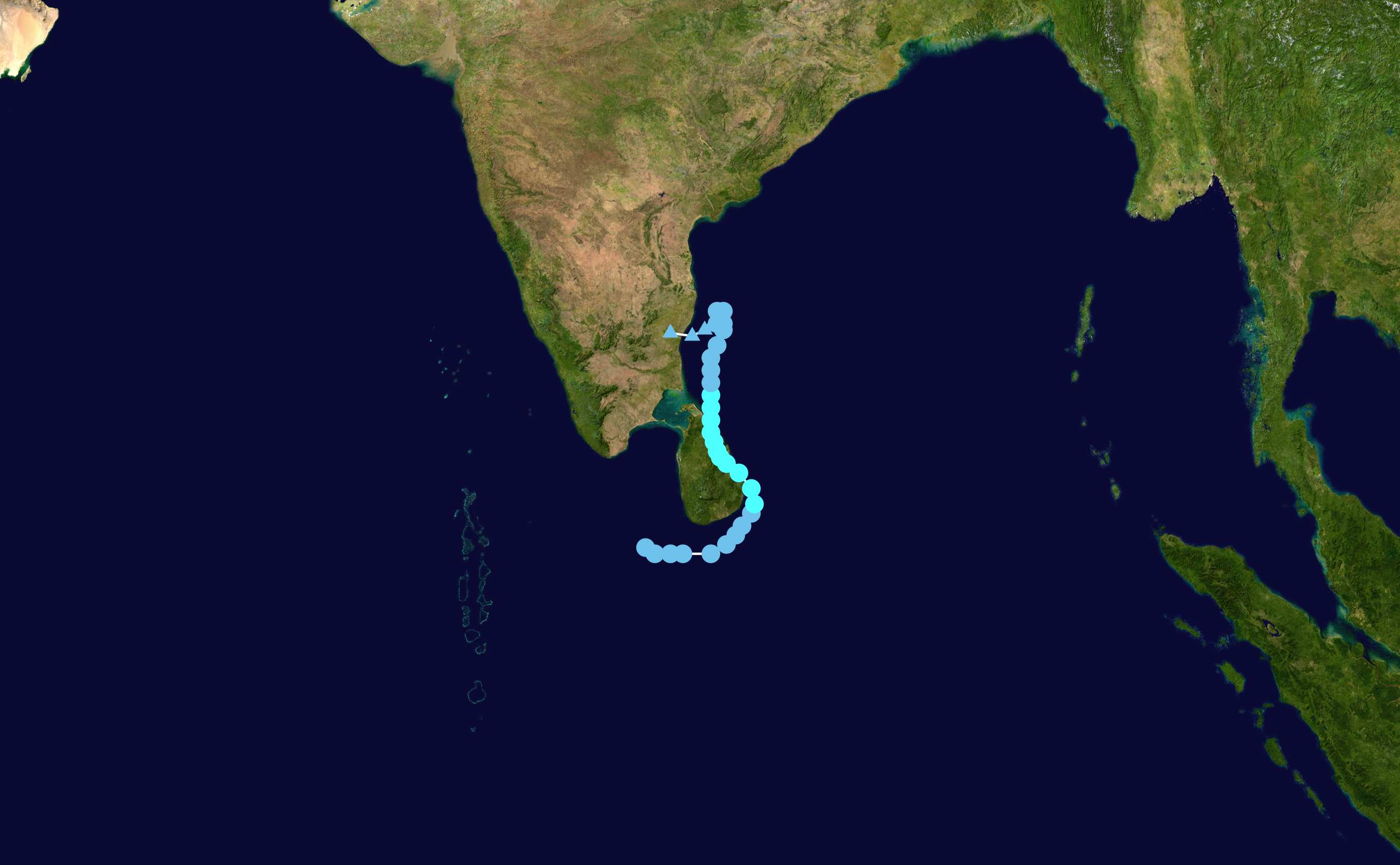
- Duration: 26 November – 3 December
- Peak intensity: 75 km/h (45 mph) (3-min); 1000 hPa (mbar)

The IMD estimated that a depression formed at 18:00 UTC on November 26 from a well marked low just offshore the southeastern coast of Sri Lanka. Amidst favorable conditions, the depression would intensify, first to a deep depression then into a cyclonic storm, being named Ditwah. (Note: The name Ditwah (Arabic: ديطوح, [diːtˤ.waħ]) was contributed by Yemen and refers to Detwah Lagoon in Arabic.) Ditwah would slowly cross Sri Lanka over the next few days, maintaining cyclonic storm status before moving off into the Bay of Bengal to the north on 29 November. Ditwah would slightly intensify for a brief time before weakening back to a deep depression on 30 November as it paralleled the east coast of Southern India.

Heavy rains from the cyclone caused flooding and landslides in Sri Lanka, causing at least 640 fatalities in the nation. Additionally, a helicopter belonging to the Sri Lanka Air Force crashed during relief operations, killing the pilot and injuring 4 others. Meanwhile, in the Indian State of Tamil Nadu, at least 3 people were killed by the storm, 2 from collapsing walls, and one from electrocution.

== Storm names ==
Within this basin, a tropical cyclone is assigned a name when it is judged to have reached cyclonic storm intensity with winds of 65 km/h (40 mph). The names were selected by a new list from the Regional Specialized Meteorological Center in New Delhi by mid year of 2020. There is no retirement of tropical cyclone names in this basin as the list of names is only scheduled to be used once before a new list of names is drawn up. Should a named tropical cyclone move into the basin from the Western Pacific, then it will retain its original name. This season mainly had the last 5 cyclones as the main storms. (except ARB 03)

- Shakhti
- Montha
- Senyar
- Ditwah

== Season effects ==
This is a table of all storms in the 2025 North Indian Ocean cyclone season. It mentions all of the season's storms and their names, duration, peak intensities according to the IMD storm scale, damage, and death totals. Damage and death totals include the damage and deaths caused when that storm was a precursor wave or extratropical low. All of the damage figures are in 2025 USD.

Name	Dates	Peak intensity			Areas affected	Damage (USD)	Deaths	Ref(s).
Name	Dates	Category	Wind speed	Pressure	Areas affected	Damage (USD)	Deaths	Ref(s).
ARB 01	24–25 May	Depression	45 km/h (30 mph)	998 hPa (29.47 inHg)	Western India, South India, Lakshadweep	Unknown	None	
BOB 01	29–30 May	Deep depression	55 km/h (35 mph)	986 hPa (29.12 inHg)	Northeast India, East India, Bangladesh, Myanmar, Bhutan	Unknown	Unknown	
BOB 02/LAND 03	14–20 July	Depression	45 km/h (30 mph)	993 hPa (29.32 inHg)	East India, Myanmar, Northeast India, Bangladesh, Central India, Northwest India, Pakistan	Unknown	None	
LAND 01	15–16 July	Depression	35 km/h (25 mph)	998 hPa (29.47 inHg)	Northwest India, Pakistan	Unknown	None	
BOB 04	25–27 July	Depression	45 km/h (30 mph)	988 hPa (29.18 inHg)	Myanmar, Bangladesh, Central India, East India	Unknown	None	
BOB 05	18–19 August	Depression	35 km/h (25 mph)	994 hPa (29.35 inHg)	East India	Minimal	None	
LAND 04	6–11 September	Deep depression	55 km/h (35 mph)	995 hPa (29.38 inHg)	Western India, North India, Central India, Pakistan	Unknown	None	
BOB 06	26–28 September	Depression	45 km/h (30 mph)	996 hPa (29.41 inHg)	East India, Southeast India	Unknown	None	
BOB 07	1–3 October	Deep depression	55 km/h (35 mph)	995 hPa (29.38 inHg)	East India, Southeast India, South India, Central India, Uttar Pradesh, Nepal, Bangladesh, Northeast India, Tibet, Bhutan	$83 million	111	
Shakhti	1–7 October	Severe cyclonic storm	110 km/h (70 mph)	987 hPa (29.15 inHg)	Western India, Oman	Unknown	None	
ARB 03	22 October–1 November	Depression	45 km/h (30 mph)	1000 hPa (29.53 inHg)	Western India	Unknown	None	
Montha	25–30 October	Severe cyclonic storm	95 km/h (60 mph)	988 hPa (29.18 inHg)	Andaman and Nicobar Islands, Sri Lanka, South India, Odisha, Central India, Maharashtra, East India	$760 million	15	
Senyar	25–27 November	Cyclonic storm	75 km/h (45 mph)	999 hPa (29.50 inHg)	Southern Thailand, Peninsular Malaysia, Indonesia (Sumatra), Andaman and Nicobar Islands (before crossover)	$19.8 billion	2,272	
Ditwah	26 November–3 December	Cyclonic storm	75 km/h (45 mph)	1000 hPa (29.53 inHg)	Sri Lanka, South India	$4.14 billion	647	
Season aggregates
14 systems	24 May – 3 December		110 km/h (70 mph)	986 hPa (29.12 inHg)		$24.8 billion	3,110	

== See also ==
- Weather of 2025
- Tropical cyclones in 2025
- 2025 Atlantic hurricane season
- 2025 Pacific hurricane season
- 2025 Pacific typhoon season
- South-West Indian Ocean cyclone seasons: 2024–25, 2025–26
- Australian region cyclone seasons: 2024–25, 2025–26
- South Pacific cyclone seasons: 2024–25, 2025–26
