= Patenga Sea Beach =

Beach on the Bay of Bengal, near Chattogram, Bangladesh

Patenga পতেঙ্গা (Bengali)
- Beach
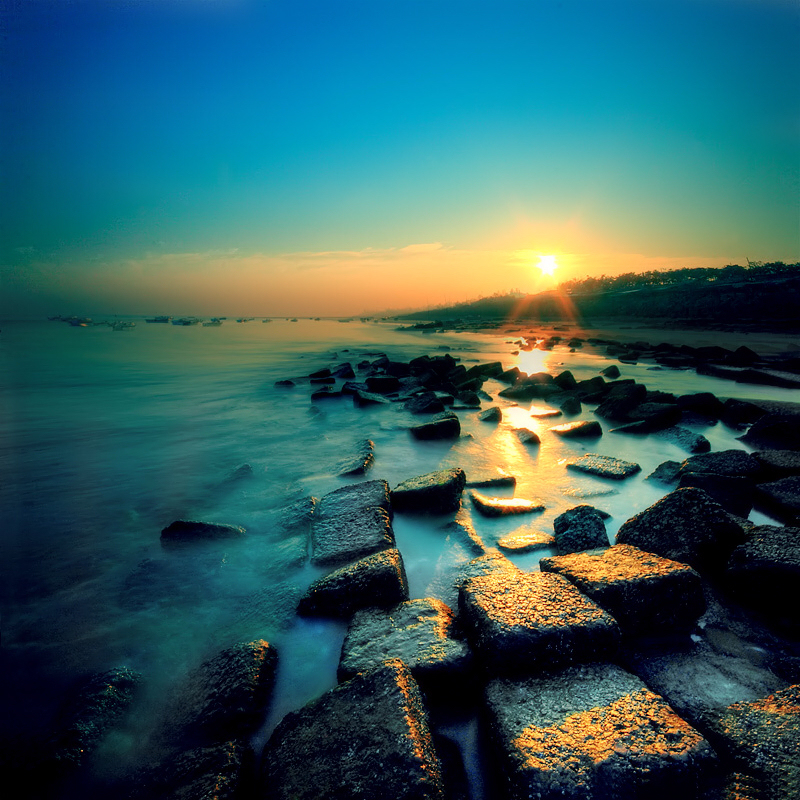
- Sunset at Patenga beach

- Coordinates: 22.2359795°N 91.7868103°E
- Location: Chattogram, Bangladesh
- Patrolled by: Bangladesh Navy
- Access: Free
- Chittagong Outer Bar Range Rear Lighthouse
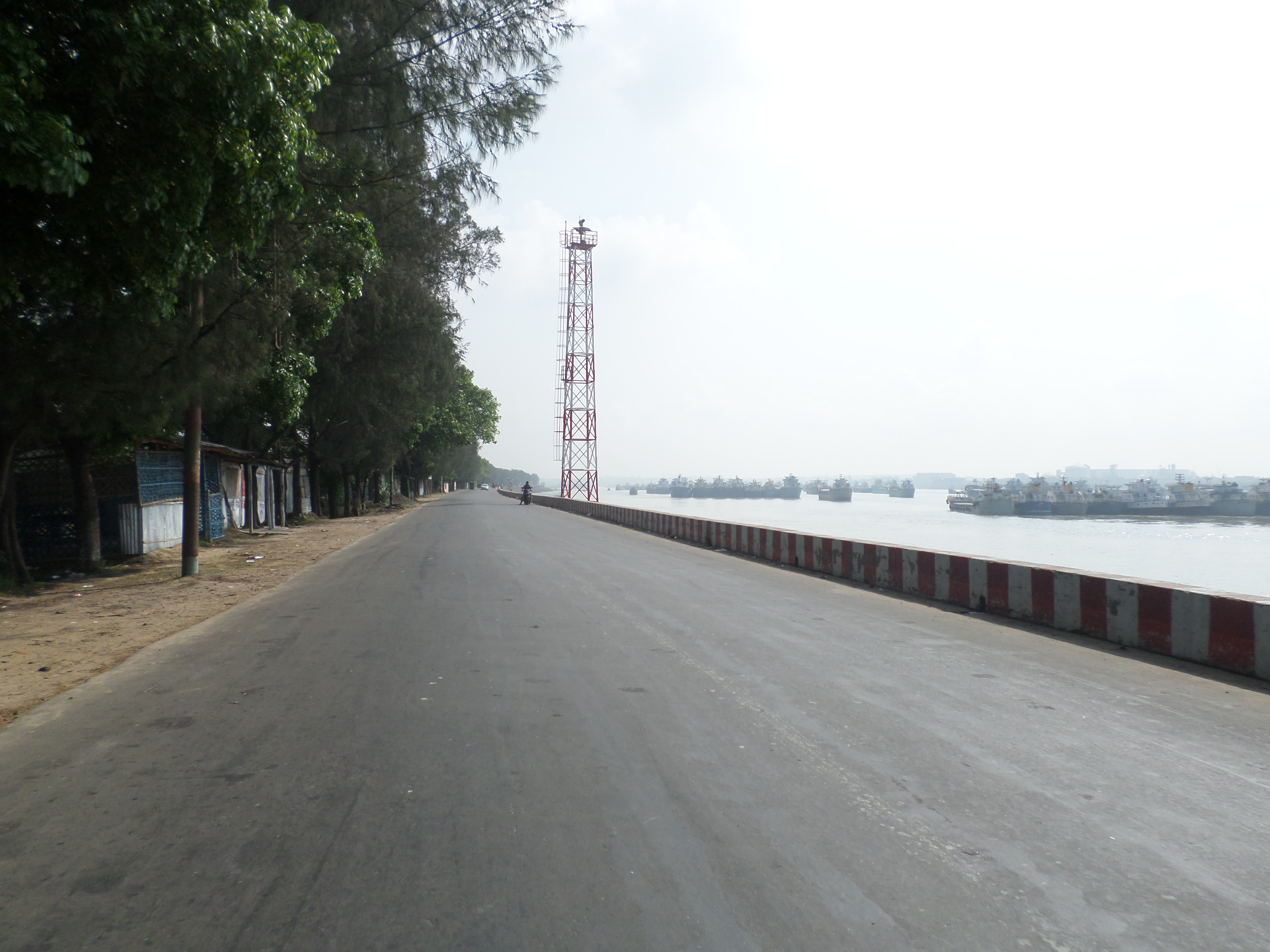
- Foundation: Concrete base
- Construction: Metal skeletal tower
- Height: 17 m (56 ft)
- Shape: Square pyramidal skeletal tower
- Markings: White and red horizontal bands tower with balcony and light
- Power source: solar power
- Operator: Chittagong Port Authority
- Focal height: 20 m (66 ft)
- Characteristic: Q R

Patenga (Bengali: পতেঙ্গা) is a sea beach of the Bay of Bengal, located 14 kilometres (8.7 mi) south from the port city of Chattogram, Bangladesh. It is near to the mouth of the Karnaphuli River. The beach is very close to the Bangladesh Naval Academy of the Bangladesh Navy and Shah Amanat International Airport.

== See also ==
- List of lighthouses in Bangladesh
- Shah Amanat International Airport
