= List of lighthouses in Bangladesh =

This is a list of lighthouses in Bangladesh.

== Lighthouses ==
Name	Image	Year built	Location & coordinates	Class of light	Focal height	NGA number	Admiralty number	Range nml
Chittagong Outer Bar Range Rear Lighthouse	Image	n/a	Patenga; 22°13′51.8″N 91°48′19.5″E	Q R	20 metres (66 ft)	26780	F1050.41	n/a
Cox's Bazar Lighthouse	Image	n/a	Cox's Bazar; 21°25′53.0″N 91°58′41.9″E	Fl W 15s.	54 metres (177 ft)	26756	F1056.4	21
Hiron Point Lighthouse		n/a	Hiron Point; 21°47′49.1″N 89°28′22.3″E	Fl (2) W 20s.	35 metres (115 ft)	26840	F1045.5	16
Kutubdia Lighthouse	Image	~2004	Kutubdia; 21°51′53.9″N 91°50′32.6″E	Fl (3) W 10s.	39 metres (128 ft)	26760	F1054	20
Norman's Point Lighthouse		~2006	Anwara; 22°10′45.5″N 91°49′16.2″E	Fl W 10s.	12 metres (39 ft)	26764	F1048	17
Patenga Lighthouse		n/a	Patenga; 22°13′38.0″N 91°48′00.7″E	Fl R 10s.	20 metres (66 ft)	26792	F1049	13
St. Martin's Island Lighthouse		n/a	St. Martin's Island; 20°37′57.8″N 92°19′12.2″E	Fl W 37s.	39 metres (128 ft)	26752	F1057	20

== See also ==
- Lists of lighthouses and lightvessels
