= Kutubdia Upazila =

Kutubdia Upazila কুতুবদিয়া
- Upazila
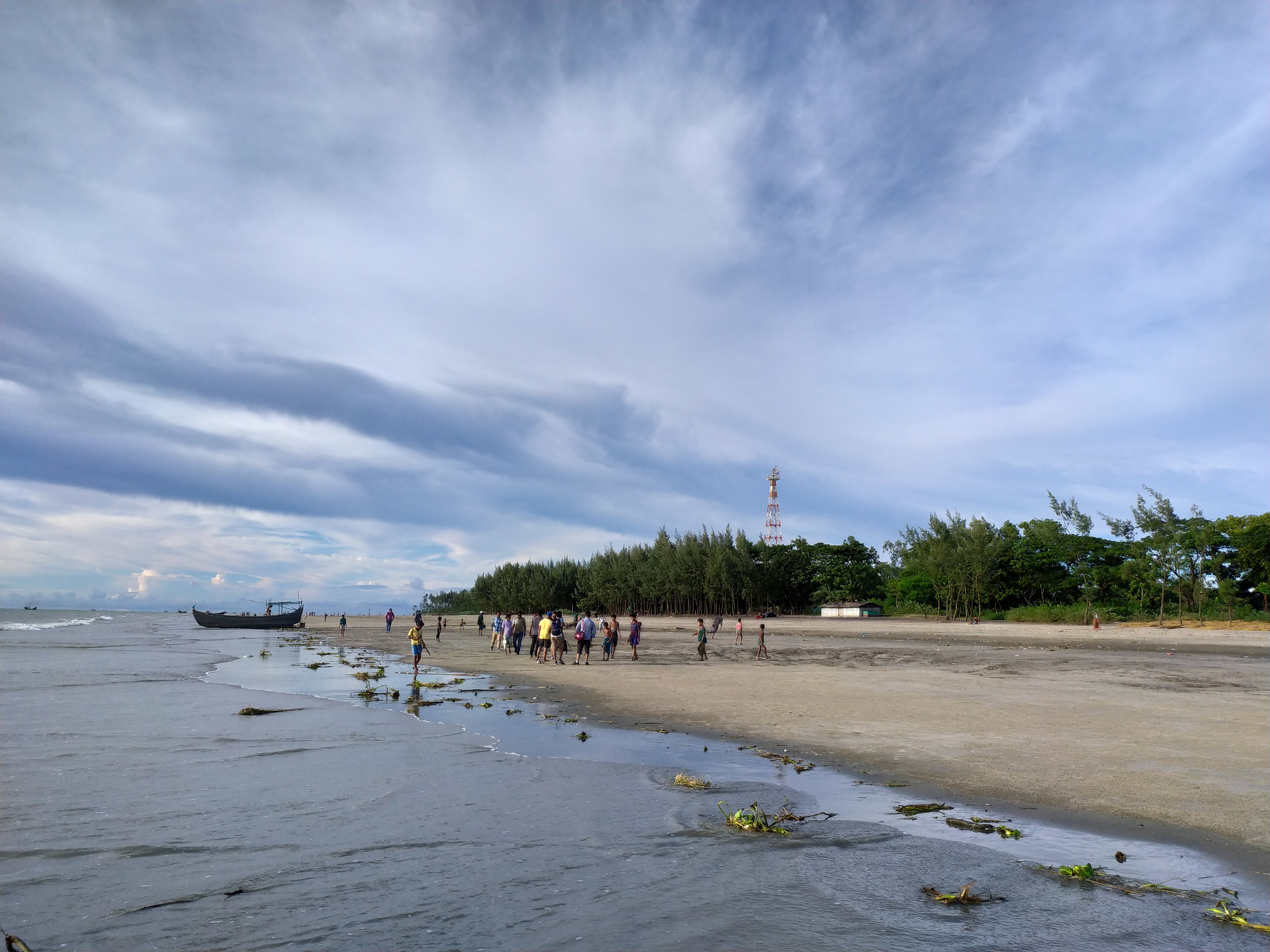
- Kutubdia Beach

- Coordinates: 21°49′N 91°51.5′E
- Country: Bangladesh
- Division: Chittagong Division
- District: Cox's Bazar District

Government
  - Body: Upazila Council
  - MP: Vacant
  - Chairman: Vacant
  - Chief Executive Officer: Mohammad Moinul Hossain Chowdhury

Area
  - Total: 215.79 km^{2} (83.32 sq mi)

Population (2022)
  - Total: 143,622
  - Density: 665.56/km^{2} (1,723.8/sq mi)
- Time zone: UTC+6 (BST)
- Postal code: 4720
- Website: kutubdia.coxsbazar.gov.bd
- Kutubdia Lighthouse
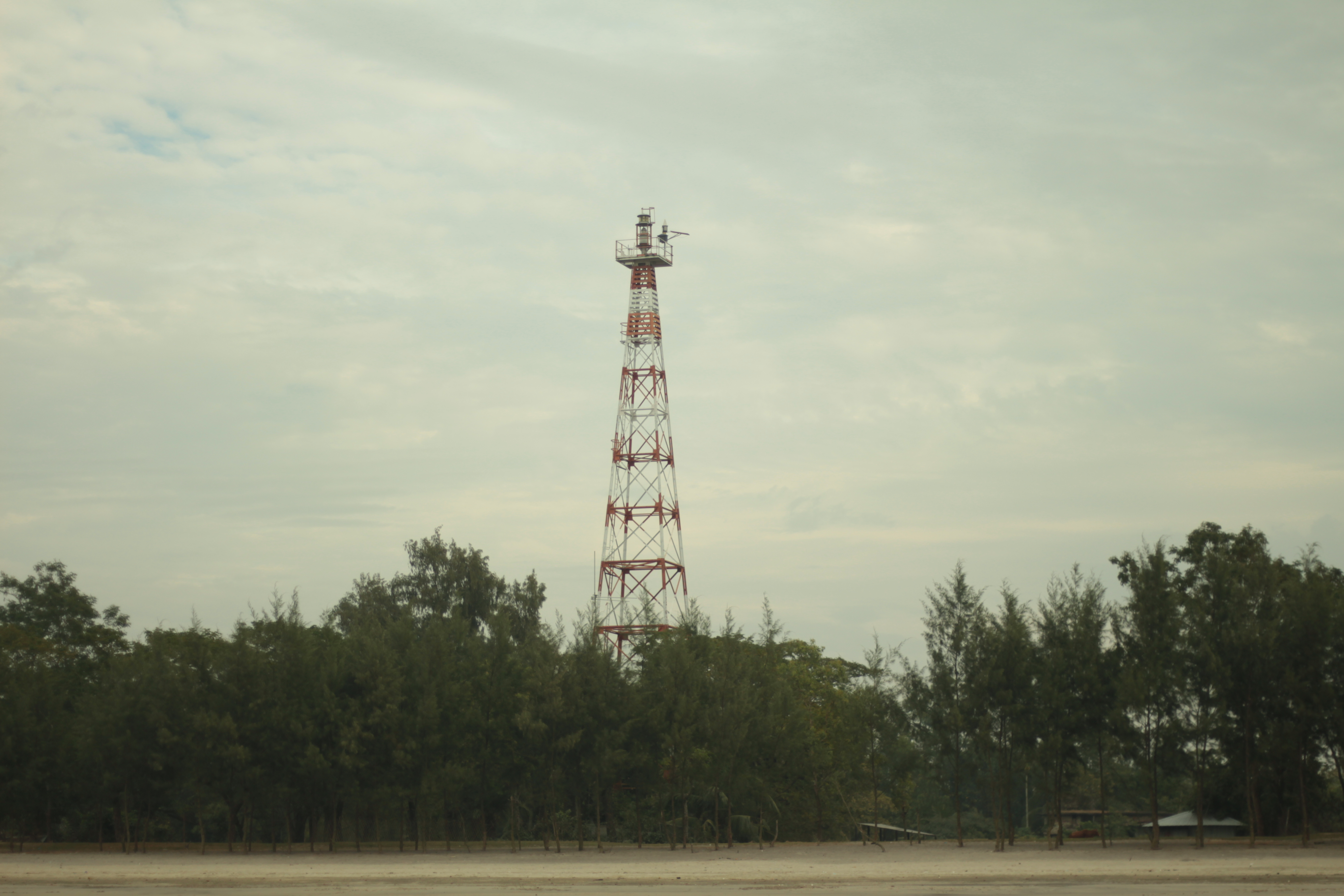
- Coordinates: 21°51′54″N 91°50′33″E
- Constructed: 1846 (first)
- Foundation: concrete base
- Construction: metal skeletal tower (current) masonry tower (first)
- Height: 35 metres (115 ft) (current); 34 metres (112 ft) (first)
- Shape: square pyramidal skeletal tower with balcony and lantern
- Markings: white and red horizontal bands, white and red horizontal daymark on the top
- Operator: Bangladesh Department of Shipping
- Racon: K
- First lit: 2004 (current)
- Focal height: 37 metres (121 ft) (current); 37 metres (121 ft) (first)
- Range: 20 nautical miles (37 km; 23 mi)
- Characteristic: Fl (3) W 10s.

Kutubdia (Bengali: কুতুবদিয়া) is an upazila of Cox's Bazar District in the Division of Chittagong, Bangladesh. The upazila consists of an island in the Bay of Bengal, off the coast near Chakaria, Cox's Bazar. It was found in approximately 14th century.

== History ==
A police station was established in Baraghup, Kutubdia, in 1917. The island was later upgraded to an upazila in 1983.

Kutubdia has an area of 36 square miles (93 km^{2}), 18 miles (29 km) in length and 2 miles (3.2 km) in breadth. It is famous for the only lighthouse in Bangladesh which was built by the British during the British rule. Kutubdia is rich in producing salt and dried fish, locally known as 'Shutki'. In this island Abdul Malek Shah was born.

== Geography ==
Kutubdia is located at 21.8167°S 91.8583°E. It has 58,463 households and a total area of 215.79 square kilometres (83.3 mi^{2}). Climate change and sea level rise threaten to submerge the island in the Bay of Bengal.

== Demographics ==
Religions in Kutubdia Upazila (2022)
Religion	Percent
Islam	94.92%
Hinduism	5.07%
Other or not stated	0.01%

According to the 2022 Bangladeshi census, Kutubdia Upazila had 28,364 households and a population of 143,622. 12.82% of the population were under 5 years of age. Kutubdia had a literacy rate (age 7 and over) of 70.37%: 71.30% for males and 69.38% for females, and a sex ratio of 107.87 males for every 100 females. 50,471 (35.14%) lived in urban areas.

As of the 2011 Census of Bangladesh, Kutubdia upazila had 22,587 households and a population of 125,279. 37,001 (29.53%) were under 10 years of age. Kutubdia had an average literacy rate of 34.04%, compared to the national average of 51.8%, and a sex ratio of 955 females per 1000 males. 25,488 (20.34%) of the population lived in urban areas.

== Administration ==
Kutubdia Upazila is divided into six union parishads: Ali Akbardeil, Baraghop, Dakshin Dhurung, Kaiyarbil, Lemsikhali, and Uttar Dhurung. The union parishads are subdivided into 8 mauzas and 55 villages.

== See also ==
- Upazilas of Bangladesh
- Districts of Bangladesh
- Divisions of Bangladesh
- List of islands of Bangladesh
- List of lighthouses in Bangladesh
