= 2025–26 Australian region cyclone season =

Cyclone season in Australia

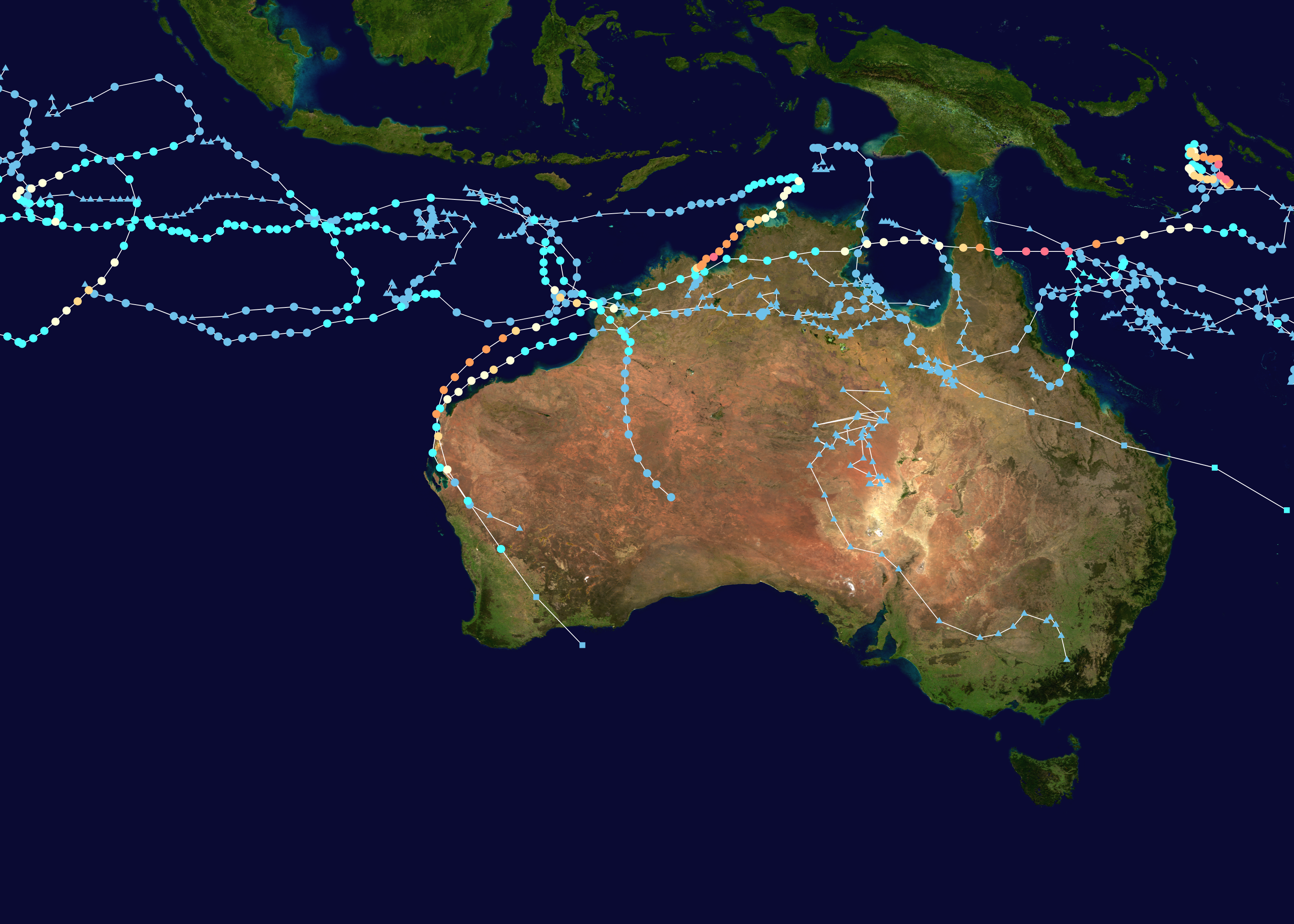
- Season summary map

Seasonal boundaries
- First system formed: 15 July 2025
- Last system dissipated: 16 April 2026

Strongest storm
- By maximum sustained winds: Narelle
  - Maximum winds: 215 km/h (130 mph) (10-minute sustained)
  - Lowest pressure: 931 hPa (mbar)
- By central pressure: Maila
  - Maximum winds: 205 km/h (125 mph) (10-minute sustained)
  - Lowest pressure: 929 hPa (mbar)

Seasonal statistics
- Tropical lows: 24, 1 unofficial
- Tropical cyclones: 11
- Severe tropical cyclones: 7
- Total fatalities: 27
- Total damage: $230 million (2025 USD)

Related articles
- 2025–26 South-West Indian Ocean cyclone season; 2025–26 South Pacific cyclone season

The 2025–26 Australian region cyclone season was an annual cycle of tropical cyclone formation in the Southern hemisphere, marked by an unusually rapid succession of storms during the early months. It was the fourth consecutive season to have five or more severe tropical cyclones, a streak that began in 2022-23. The season officially ran from 1 November 2025 to 30 April 2026, activity began as early as mid-July with the formation of a tropical low. The season was defined by an exceptionally strong start, with six named systems developing by early January—the most active opening to a season in the region since 1983–84.

The heightened activity was largely driven by record-breaking sea surface temperatures and a significant negative Indian Ocean Dipole (IOD) event, which reached its lowest weekly value on record in November. These conditions provided ample fuel for intensification, resulting in a high proportion of severe tropical cyclones. The strongest system of the year was Severe Tropical Cyclone Maila, which reached Category 5 intensity in April and became the most powerful storm recorded in the Port Moresby area of responsibility.

== Season summary ==
Graph of the value of the IOD from mid March 2025 to January 2026

The accumulated cyclone energy (ACE) for the 2025–26 Australian region cyclone season is 99.5 units. The Indian Ocean Dipole reached -1.94°C in the week ending 2 November, which was the lowest weekly ever recorded in records to 2008. A negative IOD influences tropical cyclone development in the Indian Ocean, as it leads to warmer water near Australia. Twenty-three tropical cyclones formed, eleven of which were named storms, and seven of them became severe tropical cyclones.

The season began with a tropical low in TCWC Jakarta's area of responsibility on 15 July. It was the first July tropical low in the Australian region since 2022. It moved into the South-West Indian Ocean a day later. The first tropical cyclone of the season, Fina, formed in the Timor Sea on 18 November. Fina quickly intensified to a Category 4 on the Australian Scale peak before landfall on the western part of the Northern Territory. This was followed by Bakung, which also became a Category 4 Severe Tropical Cyclone on 14 December before dissipating, looping around in the northwestern part of the basin, away from land. After that, Grant developed, and slowly intensified before leaving the basin on 27 December. The same day, Hayley developed. It struck Kimberley a few days later, weakening from its Category 4 peak.

To continue the quick formation of storms, Iggy was a short-lived Category 1 system well away from land in early January, before Jenna also curved westward a few days later, as a Category 3. The Australian region has seen an unusually active start to the season, with six named systems forming or entering Australia's western region by 6 January, making it the most active in the region to said point since the 1973-74 season. Continuing with a very active streak, Koji was a weaker system that impacted Queensland in mid–January. After a short break, Luana formed and struck near Broome on 25 January, before continuing inland via a brown ocean effect. In early February, Mitchell developed and paralleled the Pilbara coast before making landfall on 9 February. After that, a much longer break between named storms occurred. Cyclone Narelle developed in the northern Coral Sea on 15 March. Maila formed in the Solomon Sea on 4 April, and was the first named cyclone in the Port Moresby area of responsibility since Guba in the 2007, which days later became the second Category 5 tropical cyclone and the strongest of the season.

== Systems ==
=== Tropical Low 01U ===
- Tropical low (BMKG)
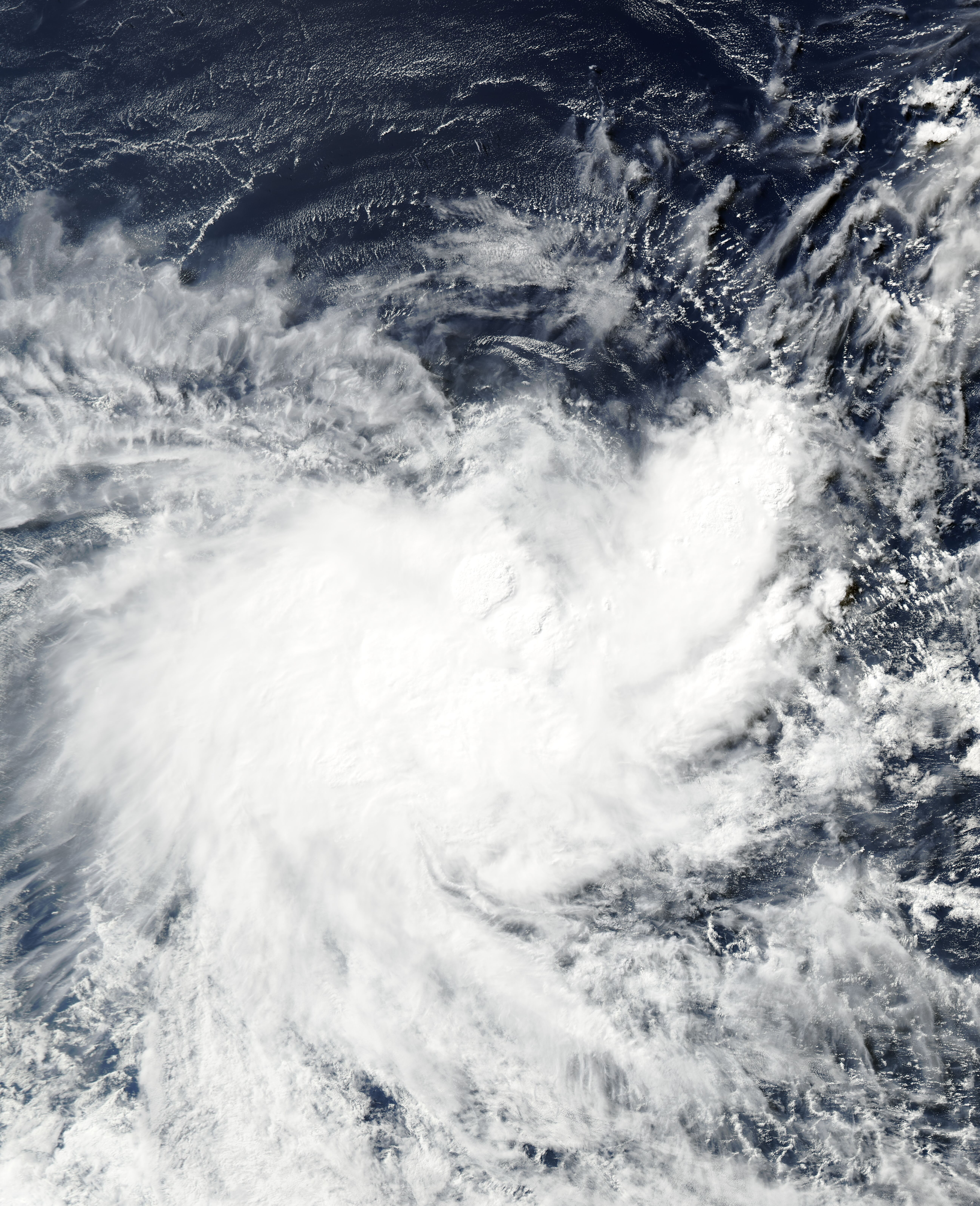
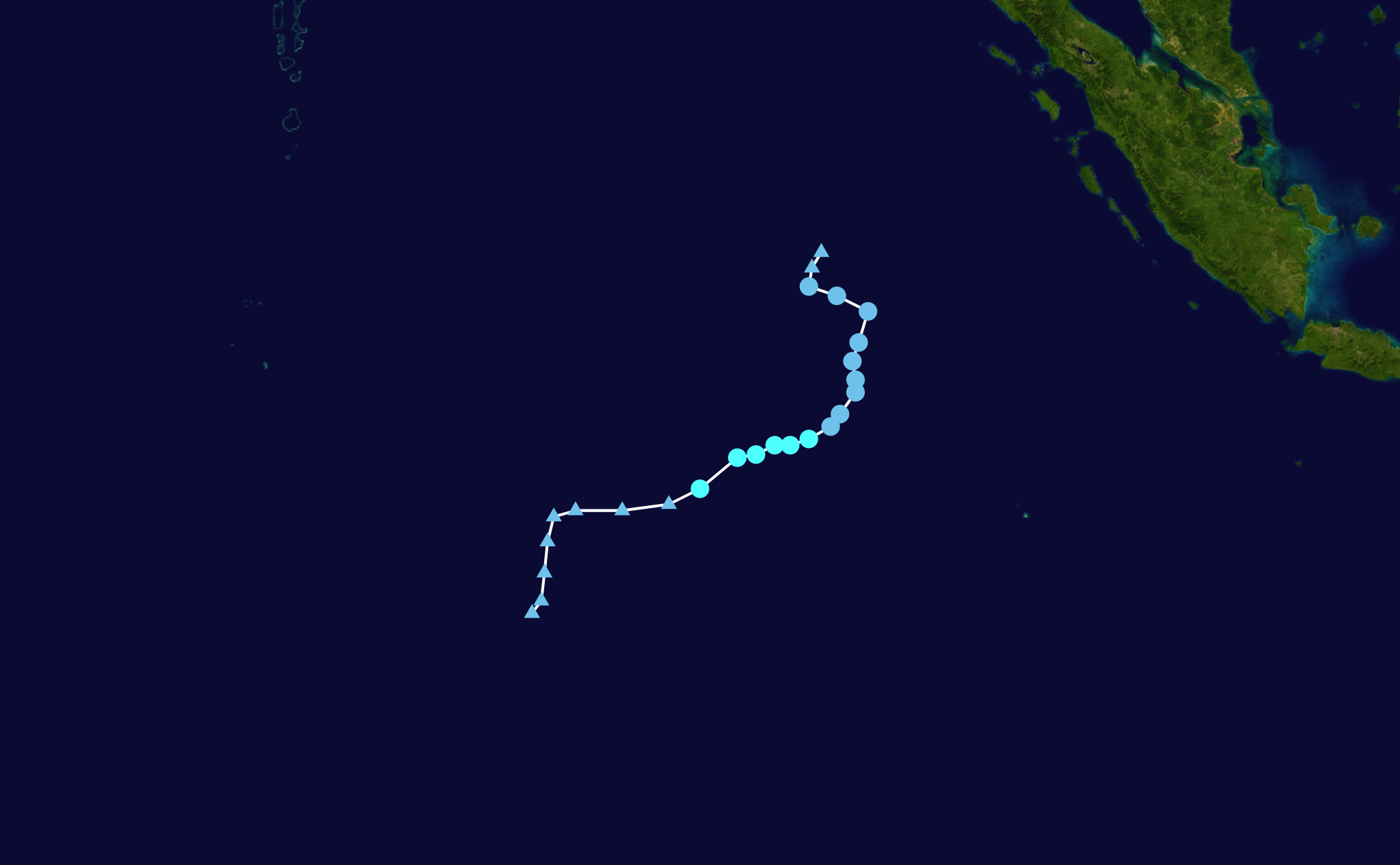
- Duration: 15 July – 16 July (Exited basin)
- Peak intensity: 55 km/h (35 mph) (10-min); 1003 hPa (mbar)

On 15 July, a low-pressure area that had developed out of an equatorial trough which interacted with the Madden-Julian Oscillation gained better characteristics, thus it was noted as the first tropical low, in the area of responsibility of TCWC Jakarta. It was the first July tropical low in the Australian region since 2022. As the system slowly intensified in an area of warm SSTs offset by high wind shear, a TCFA was issued by the JTWC, shortly before the system exited into the South-West Indian Ocean basin on 16 July, where it was designated Tropical Depression 01 by MFR.

=== Severe Tropical Cyclone Fina ===
- Category 4 severe tropical cyclone (Australian scale)
- Category 4 tropical cyclone (SSHWS)
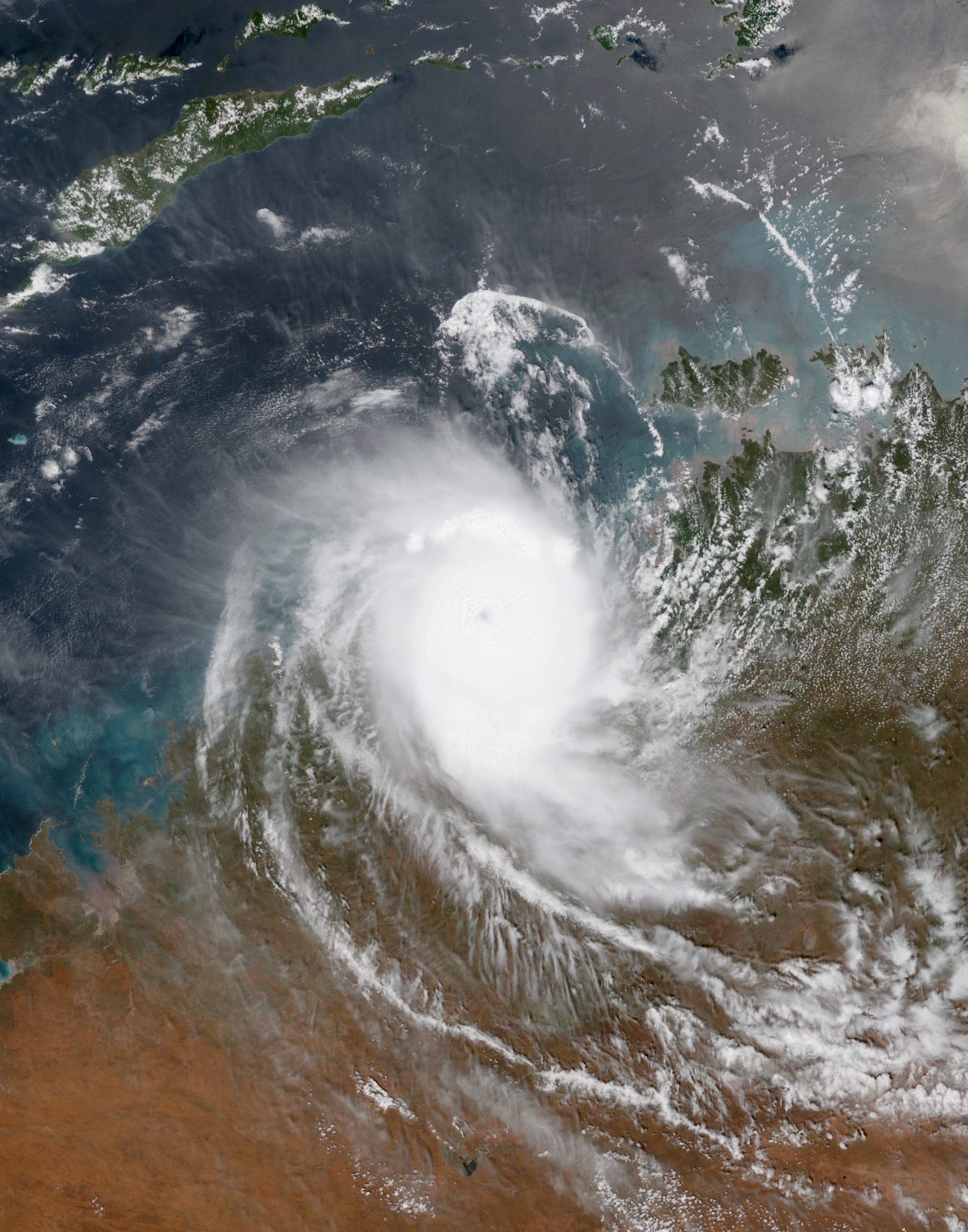
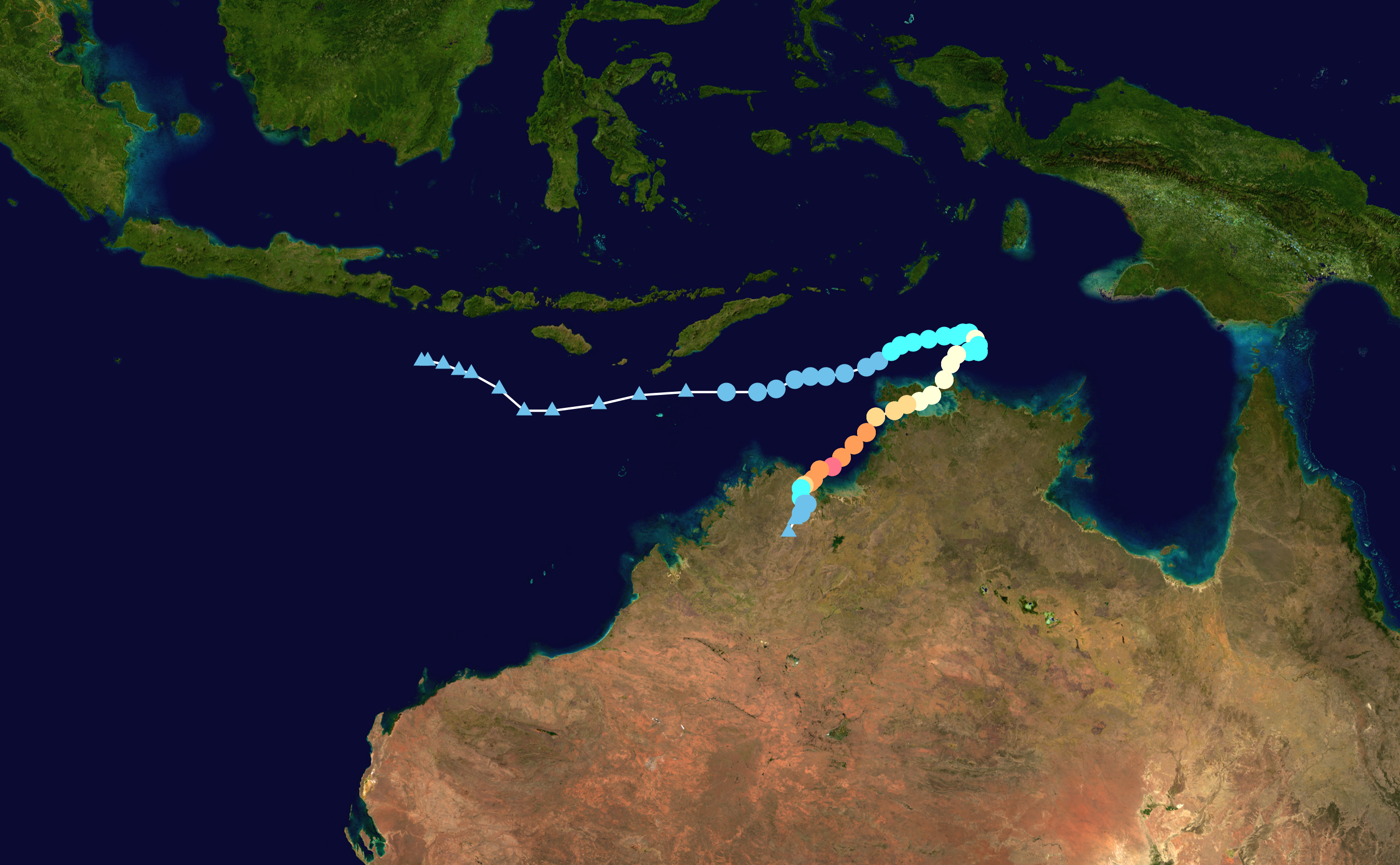
- Duration: 15 November – 25 November
- Peak intensity: 195 km/h (120 mph) (10-min); 938 hPa (mbar)

On 15 November, the Bureau of Meteorology started tracking a low-pressure system near the Timor Sea and designated it as 02U. On 18 November, the system developed stronger convection and thunderstorm activity. It intensified into Tropical Cyclone Fina on the same day and remained a compact system. On 19 November, Fina intensified into a Category 2 cyclone amid warm sea surface temperatures. A cyclone warning was issued from the Cobourg Peninsula to Warruwi, and a cyclone watch was issued for the Tiwi Islands, Maningrida, and Milingimbi Island. Curved banding was visible early on 20 November as Fina began moving south towards the Top End. Fina weakened later that day as it continued moving south due to wind shear, and its convection decreased. It slightly re-intensified that evening as it moved towards Darwin. Fina made landfall on the Cobourg Peninsula on 21 November and further intensified as it moved into the Van Diemen Gulf. Early on 22 November, Fina strengthened into a Category 3 severe tropical cyclone. Fina made its second landfall on Melville Island that morning, with an eye being visible on satellite imagery. The cyclone slightly weakened but maintained category 3 intensity that afternoon as it emerged into the Timor Sea, and its eye became less defined following the interaction with land. On 23 November, Fina strengthened into a category 4 cyclone, with a clearly visible eyewall persisting on radar imagery and a minimum central pressure of 952 hPa (28.1 inHg). On 24 November, Fina then weakened to category 3 intensity and made landfall near the mouth of the Berkeley River along the northeastern coast of Kimberley. Once inland, Fina rapidly weakened to a tropical low and dissipated on 26 November.

On 19 November, a cyclone warning was issued from the Cobourg Peninsula to Warruwi, and a cyclone watch was issued for the Tiwi Islands, Maningrida, and Milingimbi Island. On 1:09 am ACST on Friday 21 November 2025, the Northern Territory Emergency Service issued cyclone warnings for part of the Northern Territory. The Darwin Airport closed at 9 AM ACST in preparation for the cyclone, and shelves were empty in some stores across Darwin as major supermarkets were advised to close across the region. The local hospital, Royal Darwin Hospital, issued a code brown to streamline emergency management systems. The strongest wind gusts were recorded were around 109 km/h at Crocker Island Airport on 21 November, and 107 km/h in 22 November. The most notable 24-hour rainfall recorded from Fina was at Middle Point, near Darwin, which would record 430 millilitres in the 24 hours to the morning of 23 November. Across 22 and 23 November, the system caused several significant power outages, including large parts of Darwin, Palmerston, and the Tiwi Islands, affecting at least 19,500 customers. Roads were flooded, and properties were damaged. Hundreds of trees fell across Darwin, damaging cars and homes, while parts of the Royal Darwin Hospital's external wall collapsed. Losses totaled to AU$84 million (US$60.3 million).

=== Severe Tropical Cyclone Bakung ===
- Category 4 severe tropical cyclone (Australian scale)
- Category 1 tropical cyclone (SSHWS)
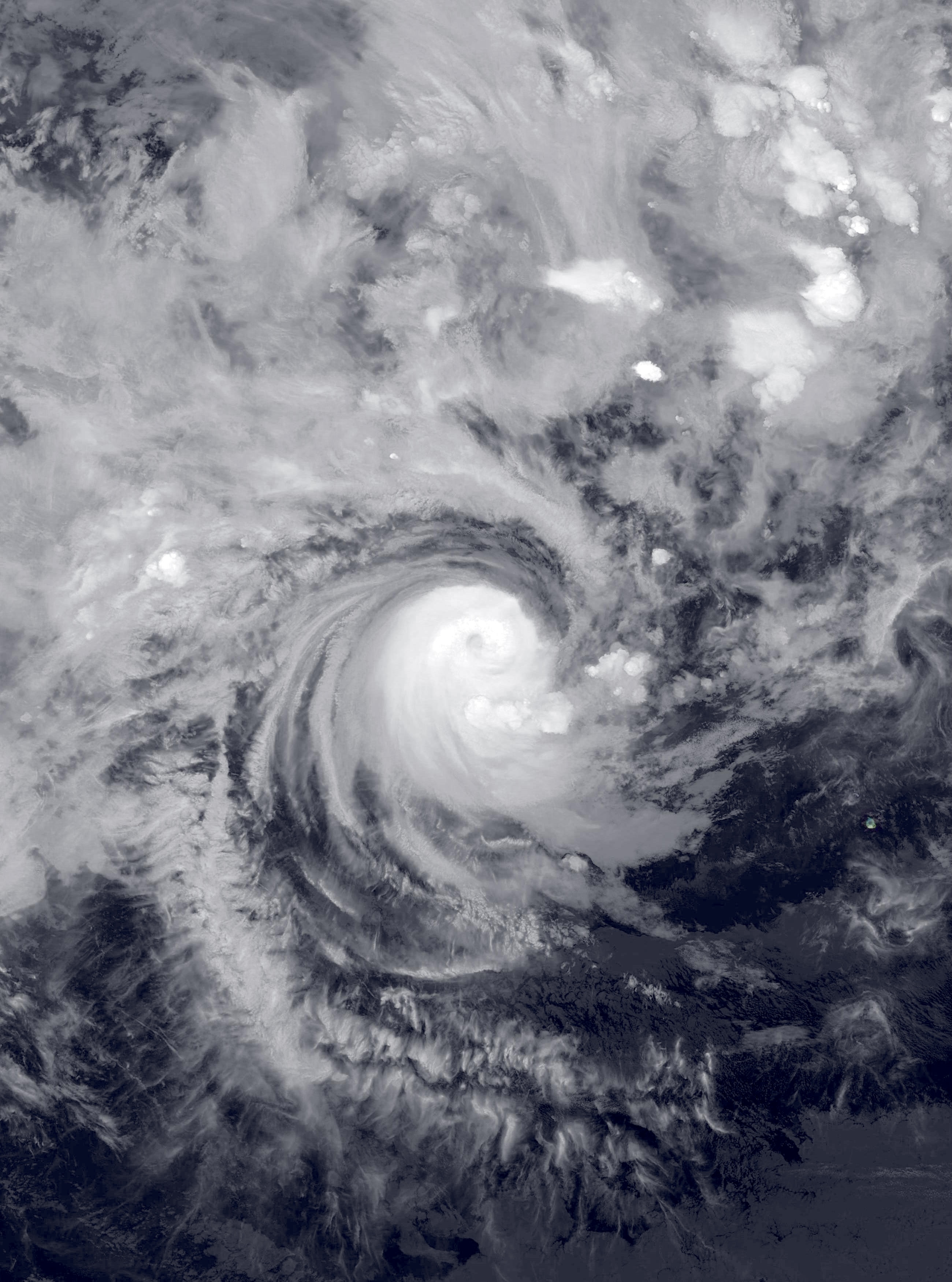
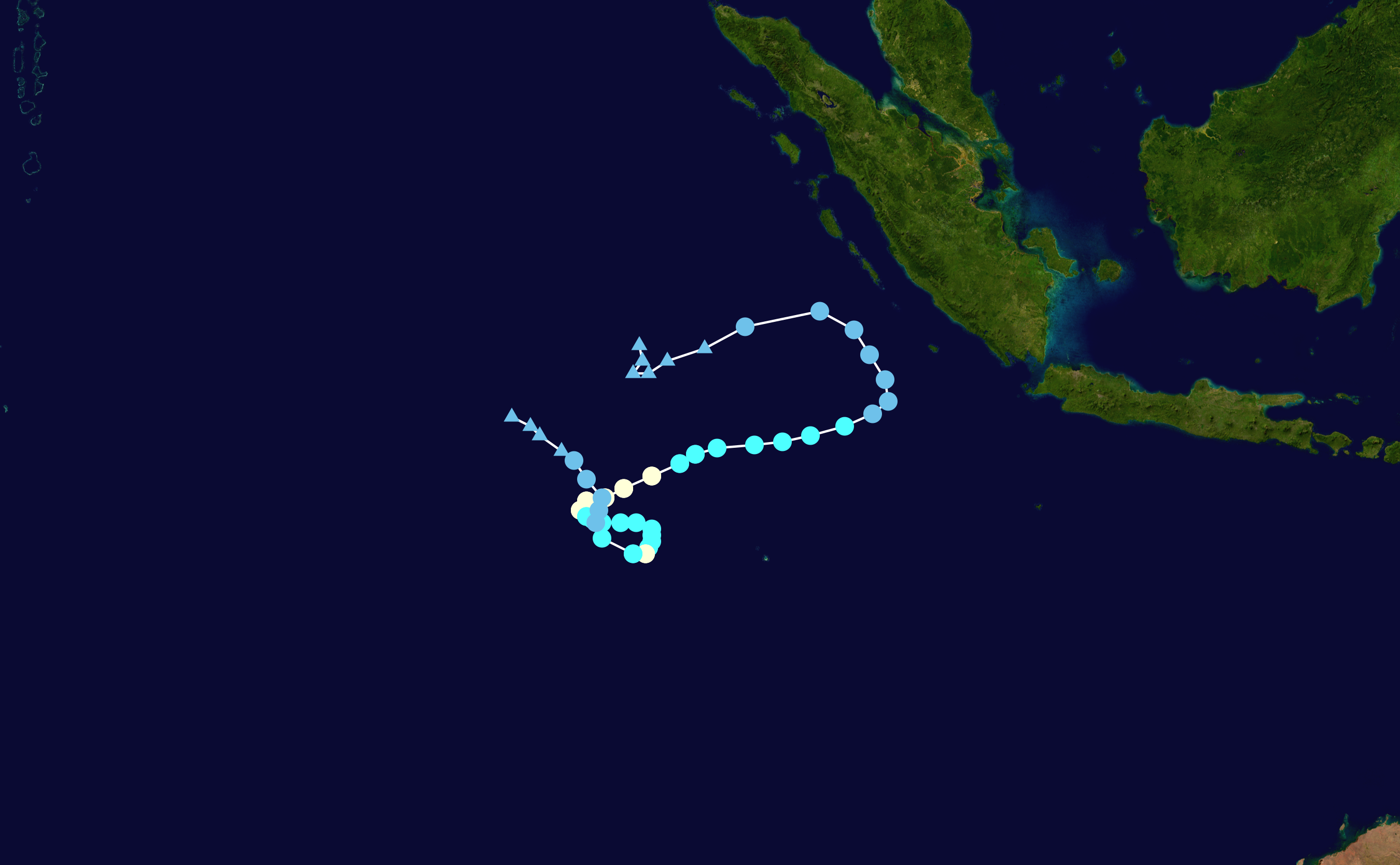
- Duration: 10 December – 17 December
- Peak intensity: 165 km/h (105 mph) (10-min); 957 hPa (mbar)

On 10 December, a low pressure area formed to the south of the city of Jakarta. Although the system was outside its area of responsibility at the time, the Bureau of Meteorology designated it Tropical Low 05U. 05U then began moving southwest, and started consolidating and wrapping deep convection near its centre. It was then named Bakung by TCWC Jakarta on 12 December. The cyclone developed rapidly in an environment of low wind shear, reaching its peak intensity as a category 4 on 14 December, and had moved into the Australian area of responsibility. High wind shear led to a weakening of the system during 15–16 December, before easing and allowing Bakung to intensify to a category 3 early 17 December. The wind shear then rapidly increased, weakening the system to a tropical low before dissipating on 18 December.

=== Tropical Cyclone Grant ===
- Category 2 tropical cyclone (Australian scale)
- Tropical storm (SSHWS)
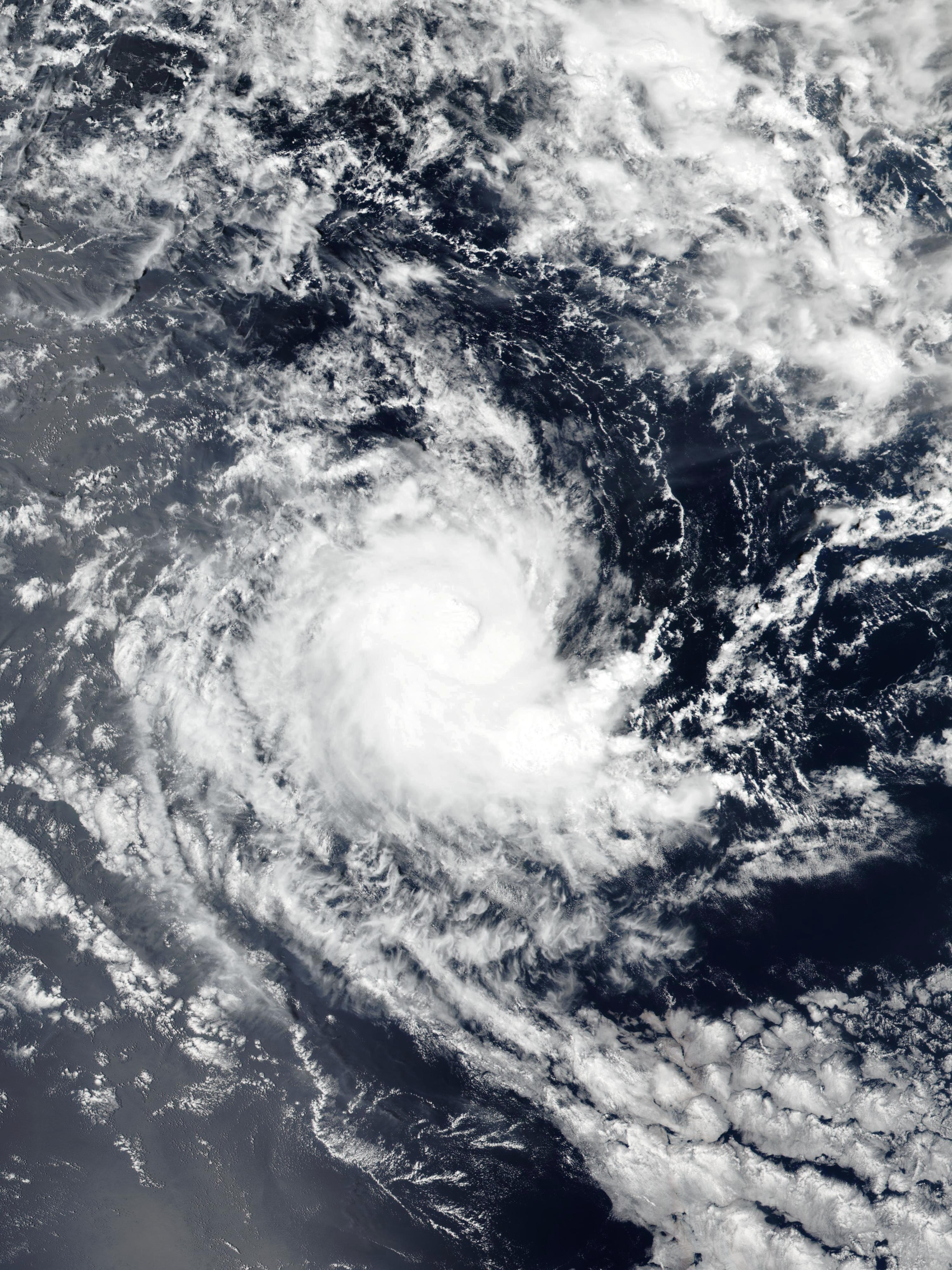
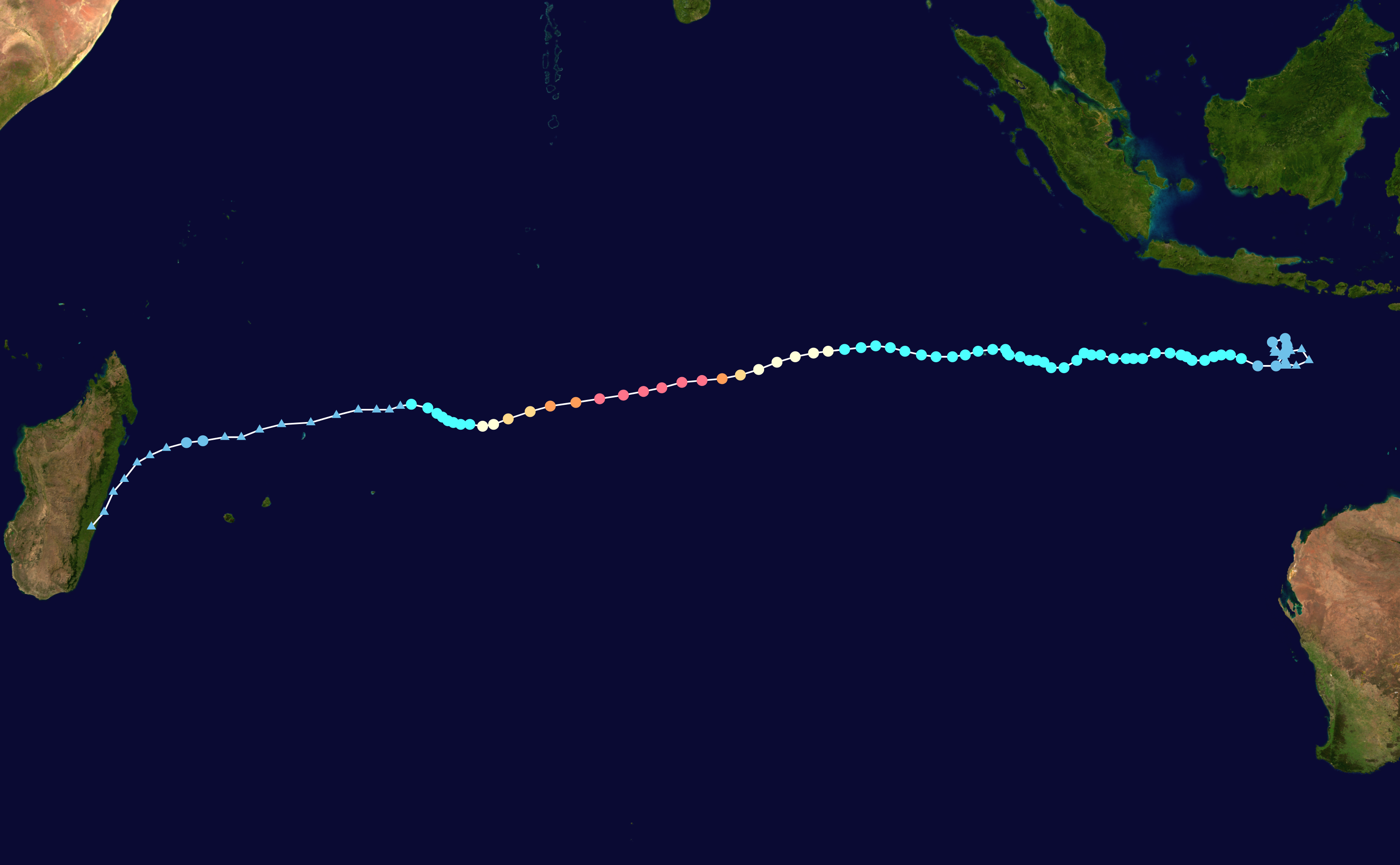
- Duration: 15 December – 27 December (Exited basin)
- Peak intensity: 100 km/h (65 mph) (10-min); 986 hPa (mbar)

On 16 December, a tropical disturbance, designated as Tropical Low 03U by the Bureau of Meteorology (BoM), formed south of Indonesia and began to move west. On 18 December, the Joint Typhoon Warning Center (JTWC) initiated advisories on the system, designating it as Tropical Cyclone 09S, noting that westerly wind shear was causing convection within the system to displace to the west. On 22 December, the JTWC advised that the system began to slow its forward motion speed due to a switch in a steering flow among a split subtropical ridge. The following day, the BoM upgraded the system to a category 1 tropical cyclone on the Australian scale and was assigned the name Grant, with the JTWC noting that convection within the system was improving due to a decrease in wind shear. However, later that day, the JTWC noted an increase in northerly wind shear and a decrease in convection and the BoM downgraded Grant to a tropical low early the next day. The following day, the BoM re-upgraded Grant to a category 1 tropical cyclone, with the JTWC noting an increase in convective banding and the cooling of the cloud tops within the system. Grant continued to strengthen, with the BoM upgrading the cyclone to category 2 intensity the next day before entering La Reunion's area of responsibility on 27 December.

Grant brought heavy rainfall and gale-force winds while passing close to the Cocos (Keeling) Islands. However, minimal damage was reported.

=== Severe Tropical Cyclone Hayley ===
- Category 4 severe tropical cyclone (Australian scale)
- Category 2 tropical cyclone (SSHWS)
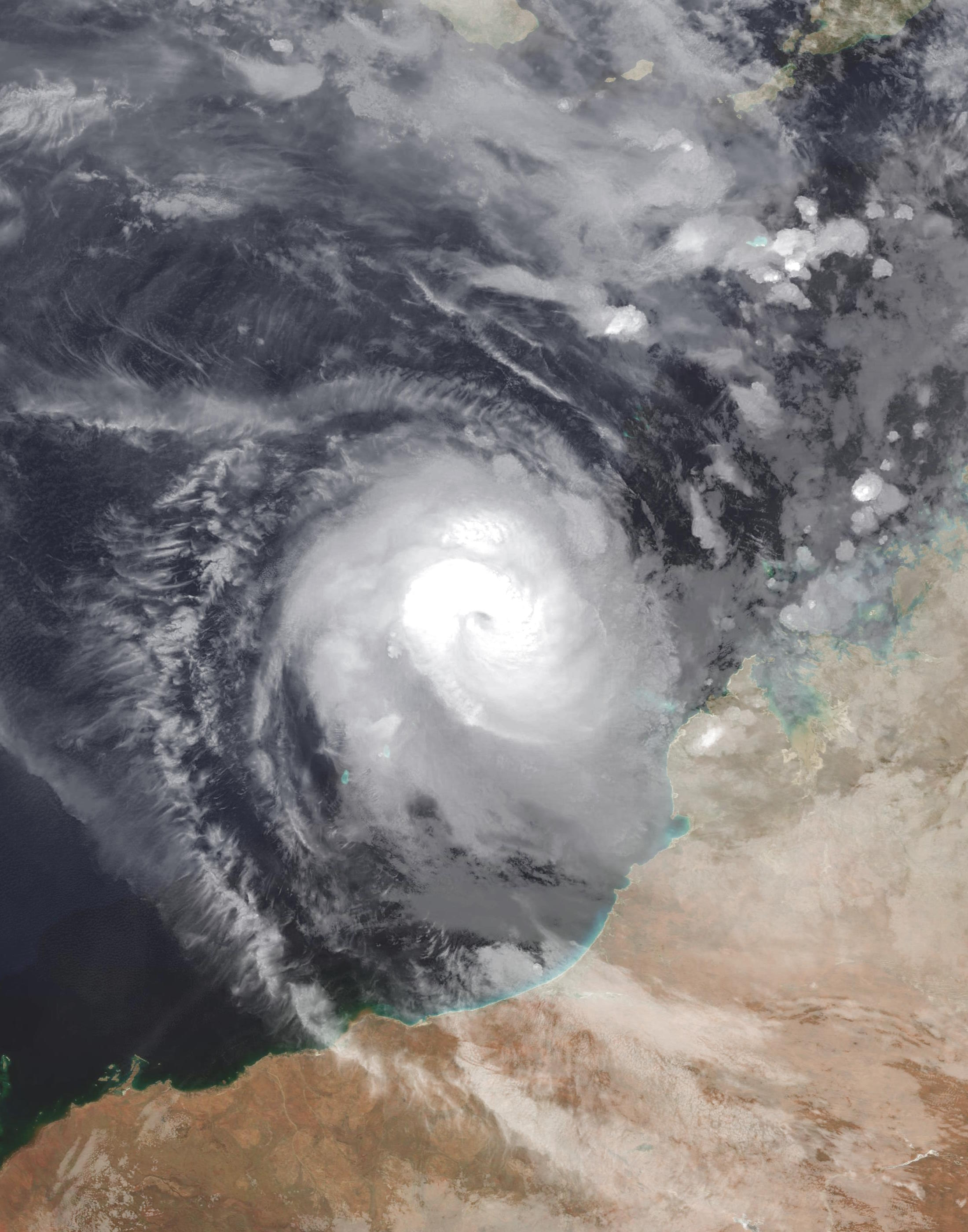
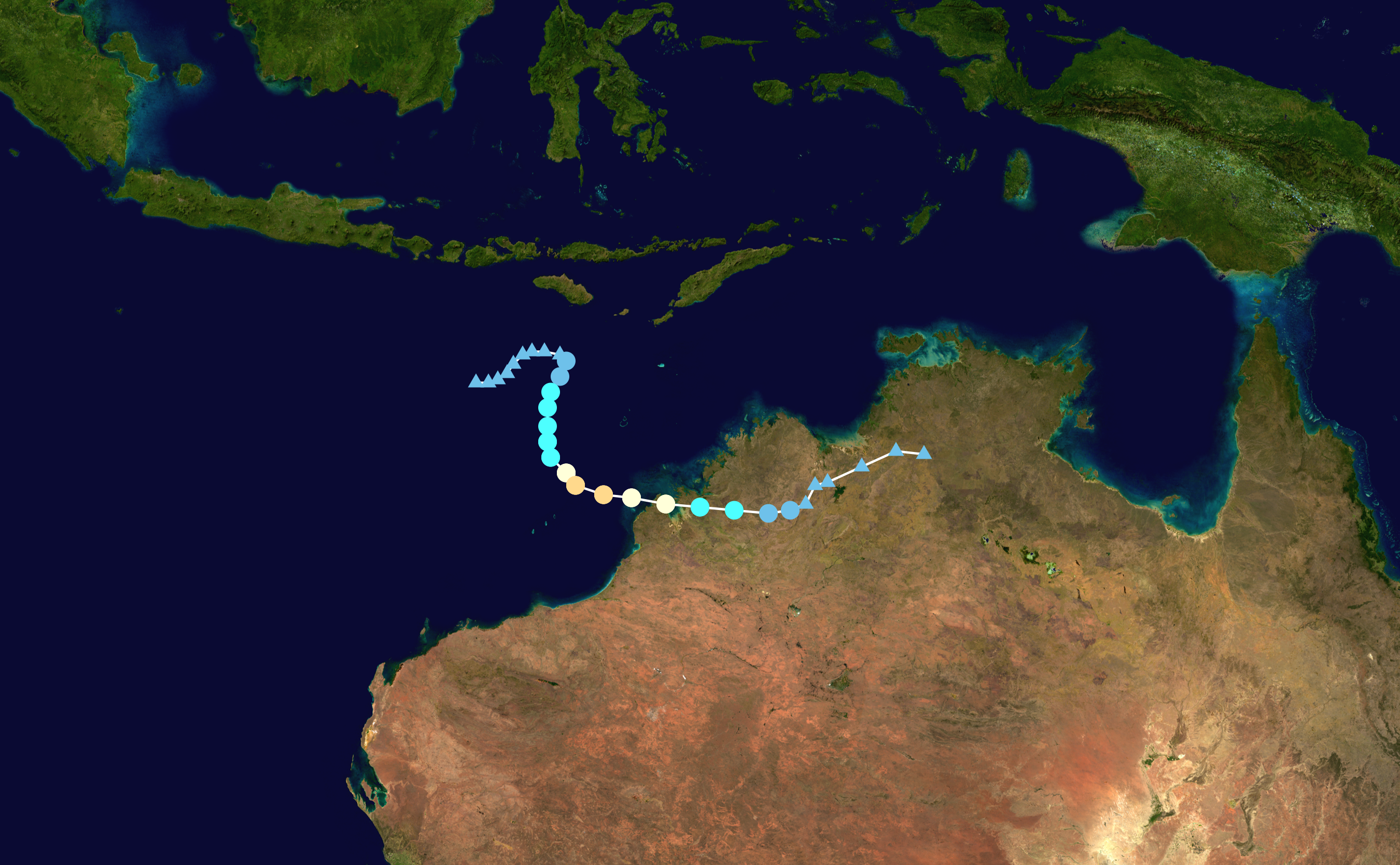
- Duration: 27 December – 30 December
- Peak intensity: 185 km/h (115 mph) (10-min); 953 hPa (mbar)

On 27 December, a tropical low, designated as Tropical Low 08U by the Bureau of Meteorology (BoM), formed 700 kilometres (430 mi) north-northeast of Broome. The low began moving south and intensify. The following day, the Joint Typhoon Warning Center (JTWC) initiated advisories on the system and designated it as Tropical Cyclone 10S. The JTWC observed that convective banding was wrapping around the centre. Later that same day, the BoM to upgraded it to a category 1 tropical cyclone on the Australian scale and assigned it the name Hayley. Shortly after, it began a period of rapid intensification, with the JTWC observing convection developing in the southwestern quadrant of the storm, along with an eye-like feature beginning to appear on satellite imagery. The BoM then upgraded Hayley to category 4 strength late on 29 December. Early the next day, Hayley weakened slightly to category 3 strength and turned east-southeast toward the Dampier Peninsula. The following day, Hayley made landfall near the communities of Lombadina and Djarindjin. After crossing King Sound, Hayley moved inland over Western Australia once again and began to weaken, with the JTWC observing that land interaction was beginning to impinge on the centre of circulation within the cyclone. Hayley then weakened below tropical cyclone strength late on 30 December and dissipated early the next day.

Portions of Western Australia received at least 300 millimetres (12 in) of rain fell in a 48 hour period, the equivalent to two to three months worth of rainfall for the region. The deluge led several rivers overflowing their banks. Flooding damaged several highways, isolating remote communities. Wind gusts up to 158 kilometres per hour (98 mph) were reported in the Lombadina community. North of Broome, strong winds tore off the roofs of two homes. A basketball court sustained severe damage from the storm. Water leaked through the roofs of several homes. A tree fell on a parked car in One Arm Point. Another fallen tree damaged the roof of a church in Djarindjin. Several communities were left without power and nine people fled to shelters. A bridge was temporarily closed after a tree fell on it. After the storm, seventeen State Emergency Service volunteers were mobilized to assist with recovery efforts. Losses totaled to AU$2.4 million (US$1.72 million).

=== Tropical Cyclone Iggy ===
- Category 1 tropical cyclone (Australian scale)
- Tropical storm (SSHWS)
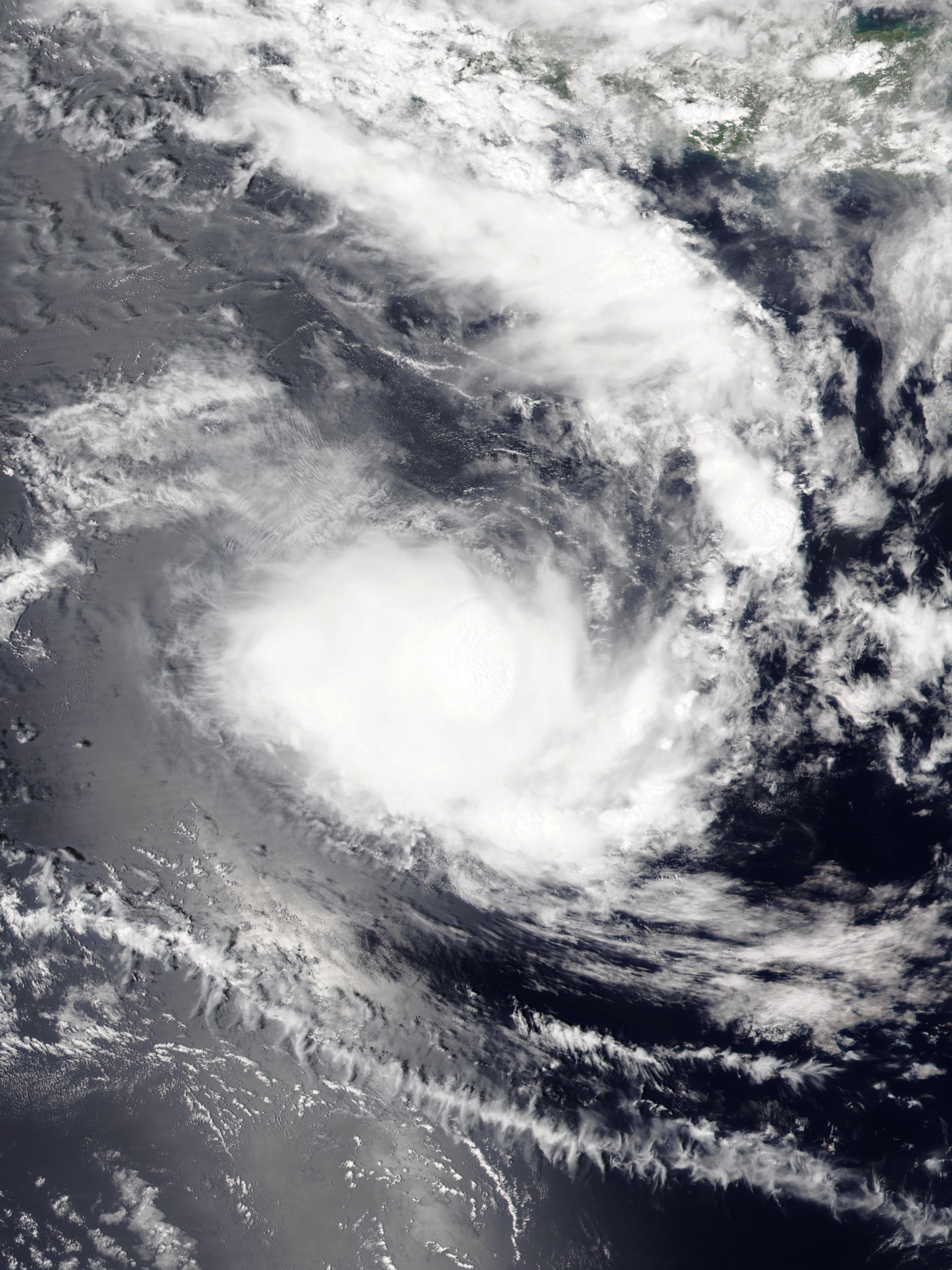
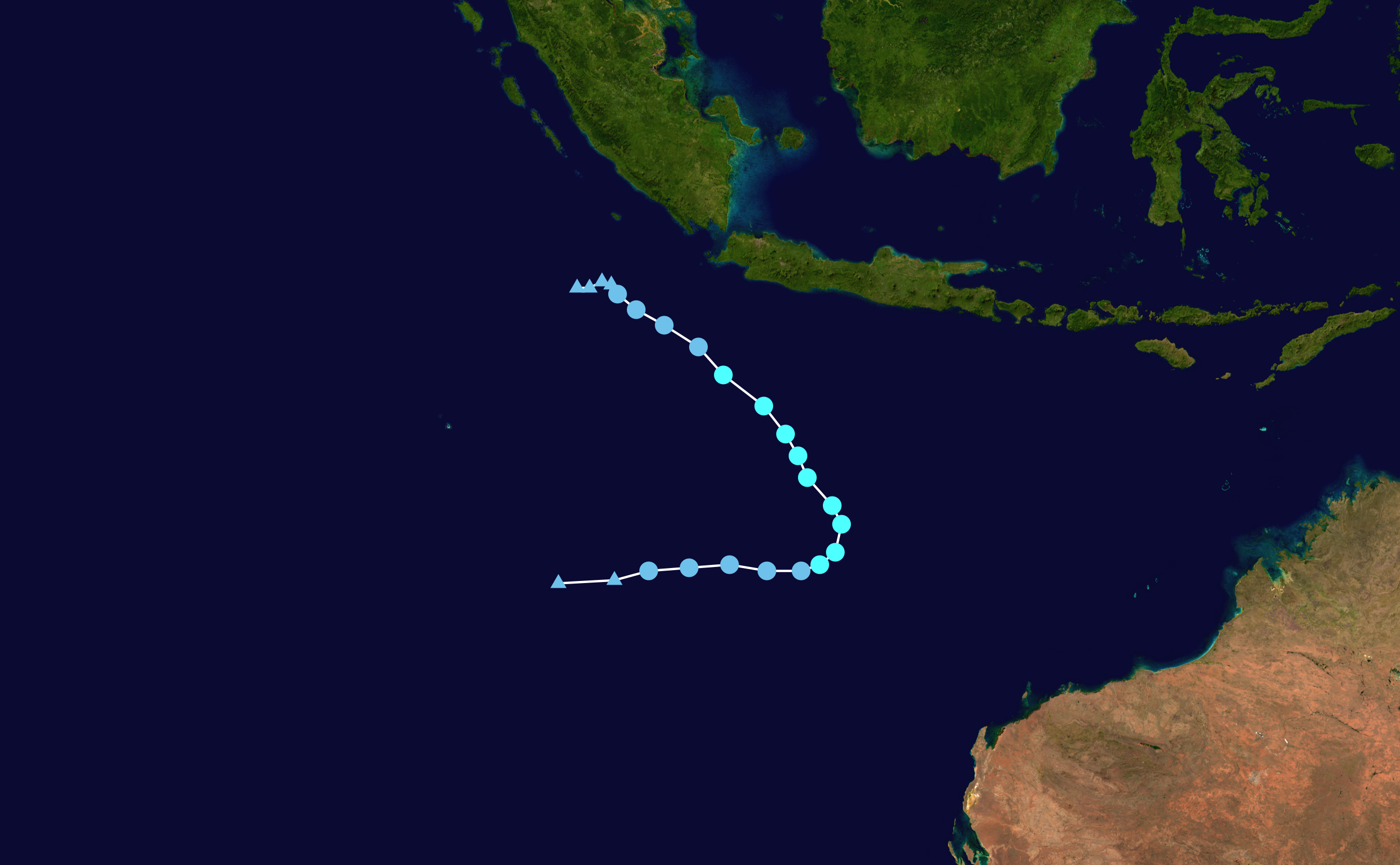
- Duration: 31 December – 1 January
- Peak intensity: 75 km/h (45 mph) (10-min); 997 hPa (mbar)

On 30 December 2025, a tropical low began to develop southwest of Sumatra, assisted by increasing westerly winds. The Bureau of Meteorology (BoM) designated the system as Tropical Low 10U. The low quickly began to move southeast and passed Christmas Island to the east on 31 December. Later that day, the Joint Typhoon Warning Center (JTWC) initiated advisories on the system, designating it as Tropical Cyclone 11S. Convection within the storm began to improve in its northern side as a result of it moving into a more favorable environment with warmer sea surface temperatures and lower vertical wind shear. Early the next day, the BoM determined that the low intensified into a category 1 tropical cyclone on the Australian scale and assigned the name Iggy. Iggy then weakened 18 hours later to a tropical low, with gales in the system confining to the eastern side. On 2 January, Iggy turned west and all gales within the system collapsed. Iggy then dissipated over the Indian Ocean shortly after.

While closely passing to the east of Christmas Island, the storm brought 151.2 millimetres (5.95 in) of rain to the territory.

=== Severe Tropical Cyclone Jenna ===
- Category 4 severe tropical cyclone (Australian scale)
- Category 2 tropical cyclone (SSHWS)
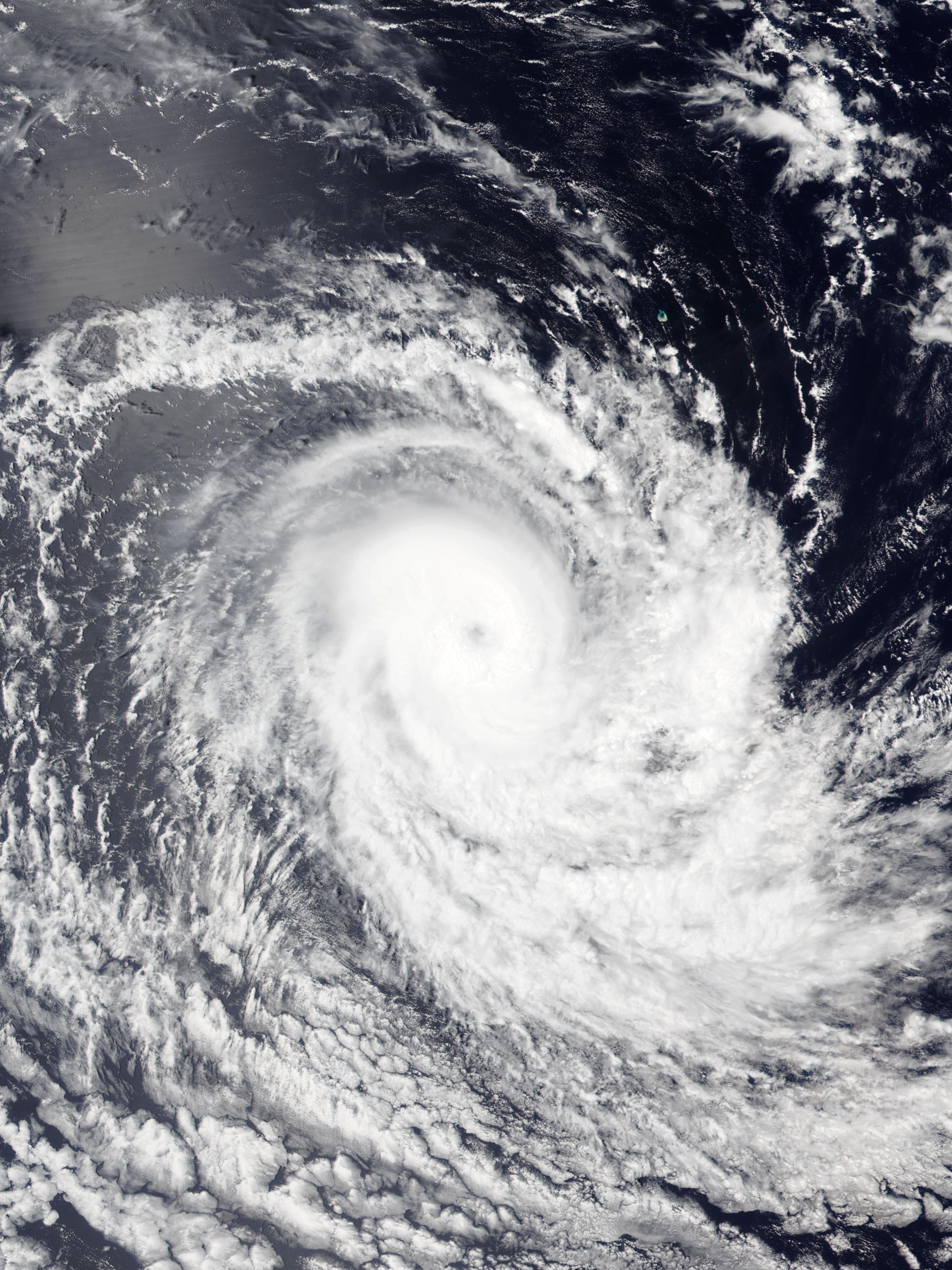
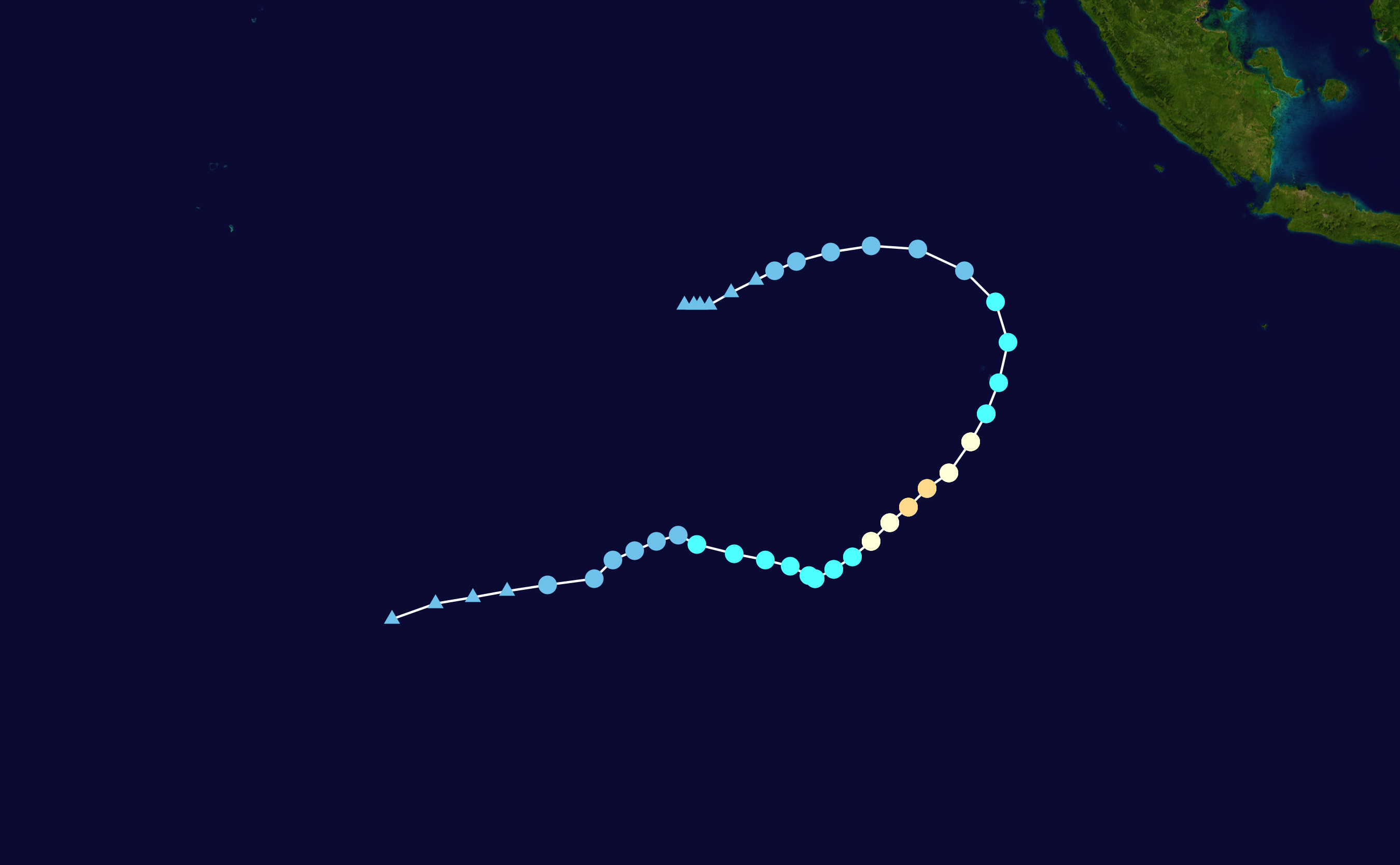
- Duration: 3 January – 8 January (Exited basin)
- Peak intensity: 165 km/h (105 mph) (10-min); 967 hPa (mbar)

On 3 January, a tropical low, designated as Tropical Low 11U by the Bureau of Meteorology (BoM), formed from a burst of westerly winds located to the northwest of the Cocos (Keeling) Islands. The low began to move quickly to the east and turned south the following day. Later that same day, the Joint Typhoon Warning Center (JTWC) initiated advisories on the system and designated it as Tropical Cyclone 12S. The JTWC noted that the cyclone was gradually beginning to organize with deep convection developing in the northern and western portions of the storm with its cloud tops beginning to cool. Early the next day, the BoM upgraded the low to a category 1 tropical cyclone on the Australian scale and assigned the name Jenna while the cyclone passed east of the Cocos (Keeling) Islands. Jenna then turned south-southwest, beginning to strengthen as a result of moving into a more favourable environment for intensification. The next day, the BoM upgraded Jenna to a category 4 tropical cyclone on the Australian scale. Shortly after, Jenna began to rapidly weaken. The following day, the JWTC noted the satellite presentation of the cyclone was beginning to degrade, with increasing easterly wind shear causing convection in the system to displace south of its centre. Westerly wind shear caused all convection within the system to displace southeast of its centre and the BoM downgraded the cyclone to a tropical low early the next day. The low then turned west and exited the basin.

Jenna brought 70.2 millimetres (2.76 in) of rain and wind gusts up to 94 kilometres per hour (58 mph) to the Cocos (Keeling) Islands. Residents reported minor flooding and downed trees in the territory.

=== Tropical Cyclone Koji ===
- Category 2 tropical cyclone (Australian scale)
- Tropical storm (SSHWS)
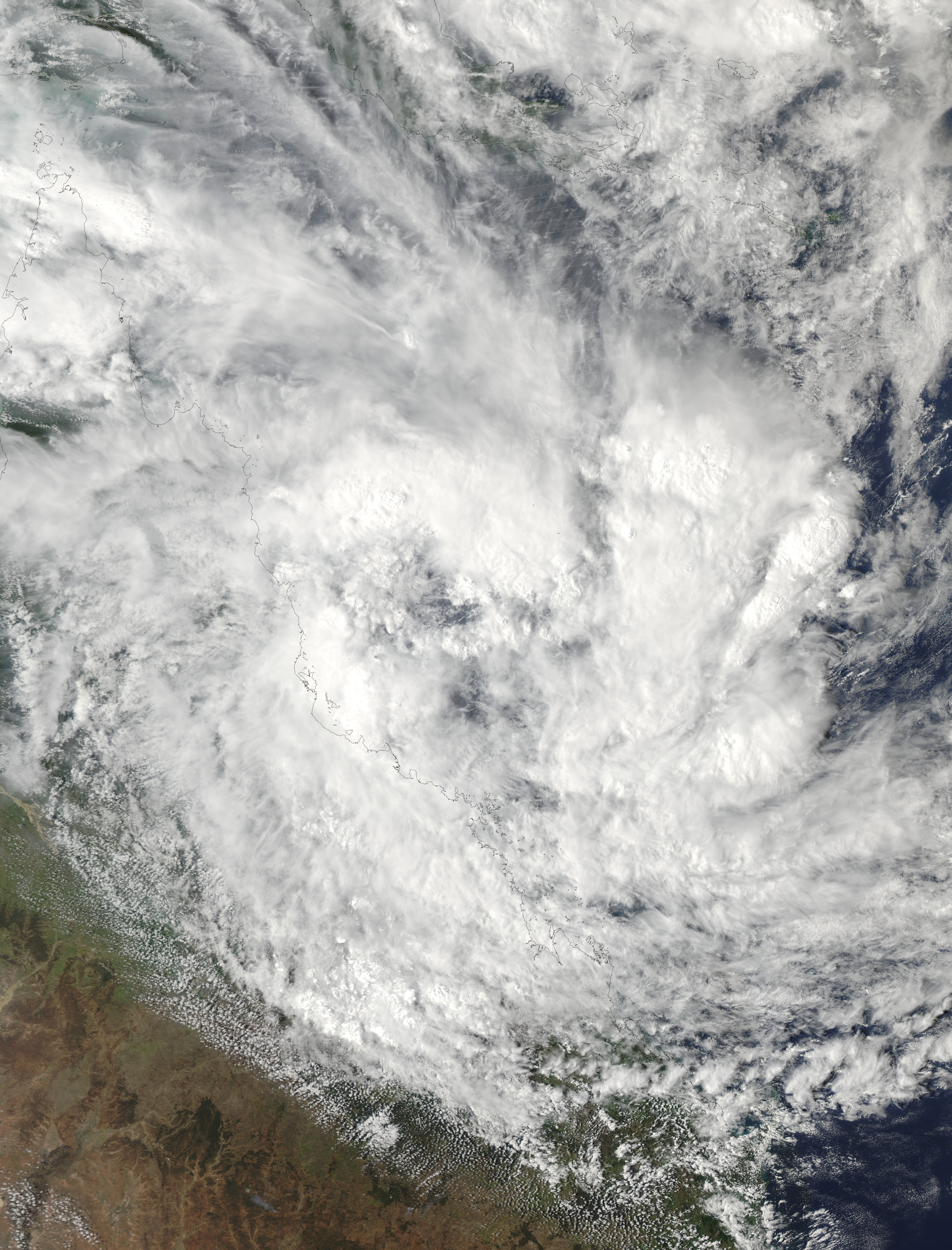
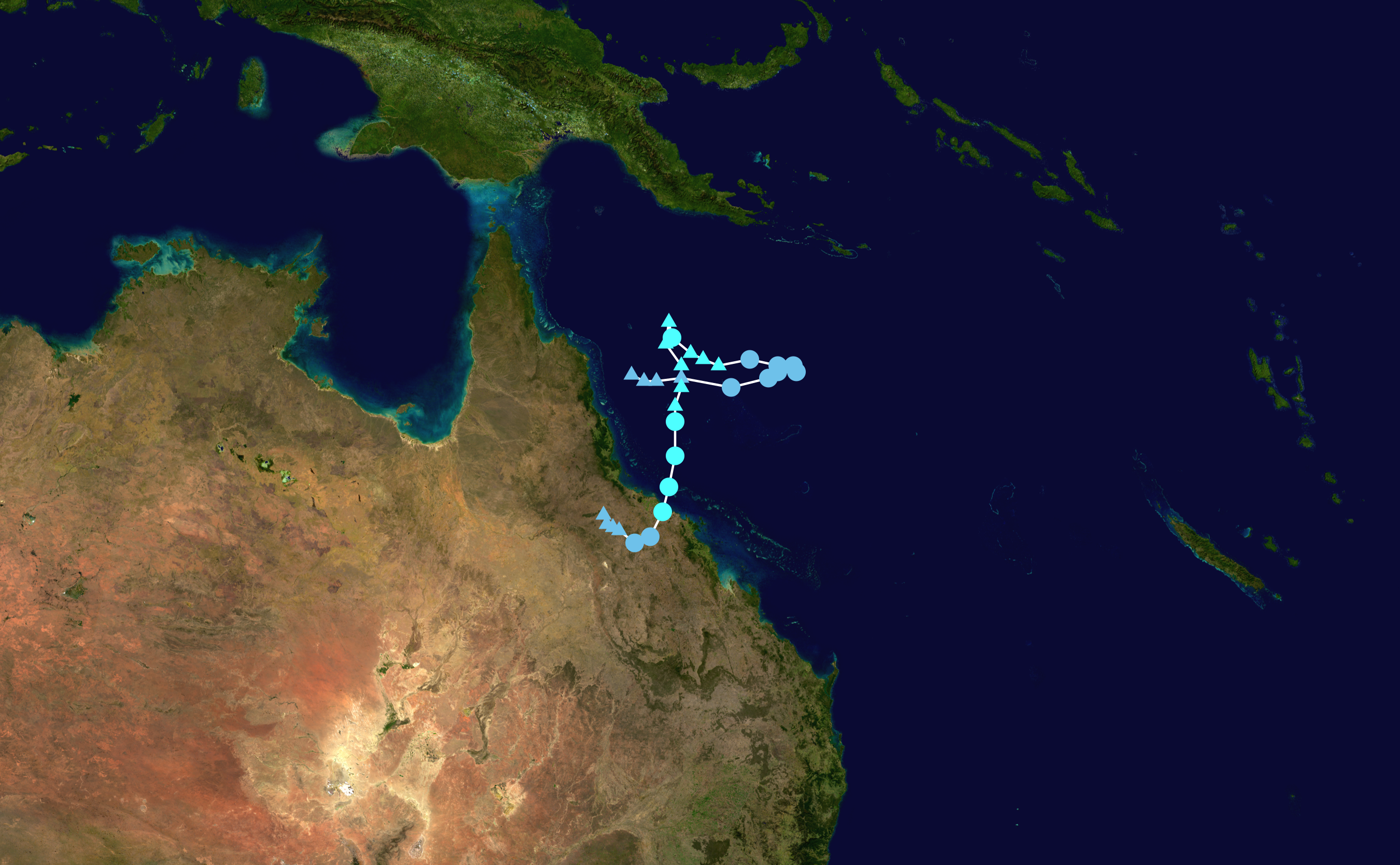
- Duration: 7 January – 11 January
- Peak intensity: 100 km/h (65 mph) (10-min); 987 hPa (mbar)

On 7 January, a broad monsoon depression formed in the Coral Sea, and was designated Tropical Low 12U. Early on 10 January, gales began to wrap around the low, and the Bureau of Meteorology (BoM) upgraded the low to a category 2 tropical cyclone the Australian scale and assigned the name Koji. The Joint Typhoon Warning Center (JTWC) designated the system as Tropical Cyclone 13P and noted that Koji remained disorganized, with the majority of convection being displaced from the centre of the system. However, the extent of gales within the system began to decrease and Koji weakened to a tropical low late the same day, shortly before moving ashore on the Queensland coast between Ayr and Bowen. The system persisted as a tropical low inland over Queensland until it ultimately dissipated on 14 January.

Strong winds caused fences, trees and power lines to fall while heavy rainfall flooded roadways and bridges, triggered several landslides, and caused rivers to overflow their banks. Approximately 23,000 customers were left without power. Several locations recorded very high 48 hour rainfall totals, including Mackay, which received over 700 millimetres (28 in). Towns that sustained major damage included Clermont, which saw up to 71 homes affected, and Eungella, which received severe damage to roads and was unable to receive food or medical supplies. Queensland Premier David Crisafulli stated that over 50,000 cattle were lost to the event. Twenty five boats were destroyed by the cyclone, leaving several people homeless. Damage totaled to AU$53.5 million (US$38.4 million).

=== Tropical Cyclone Luana ===
- Category 2 tropical cyclone (Australian scale)
- Tropical storm (SSHWS)
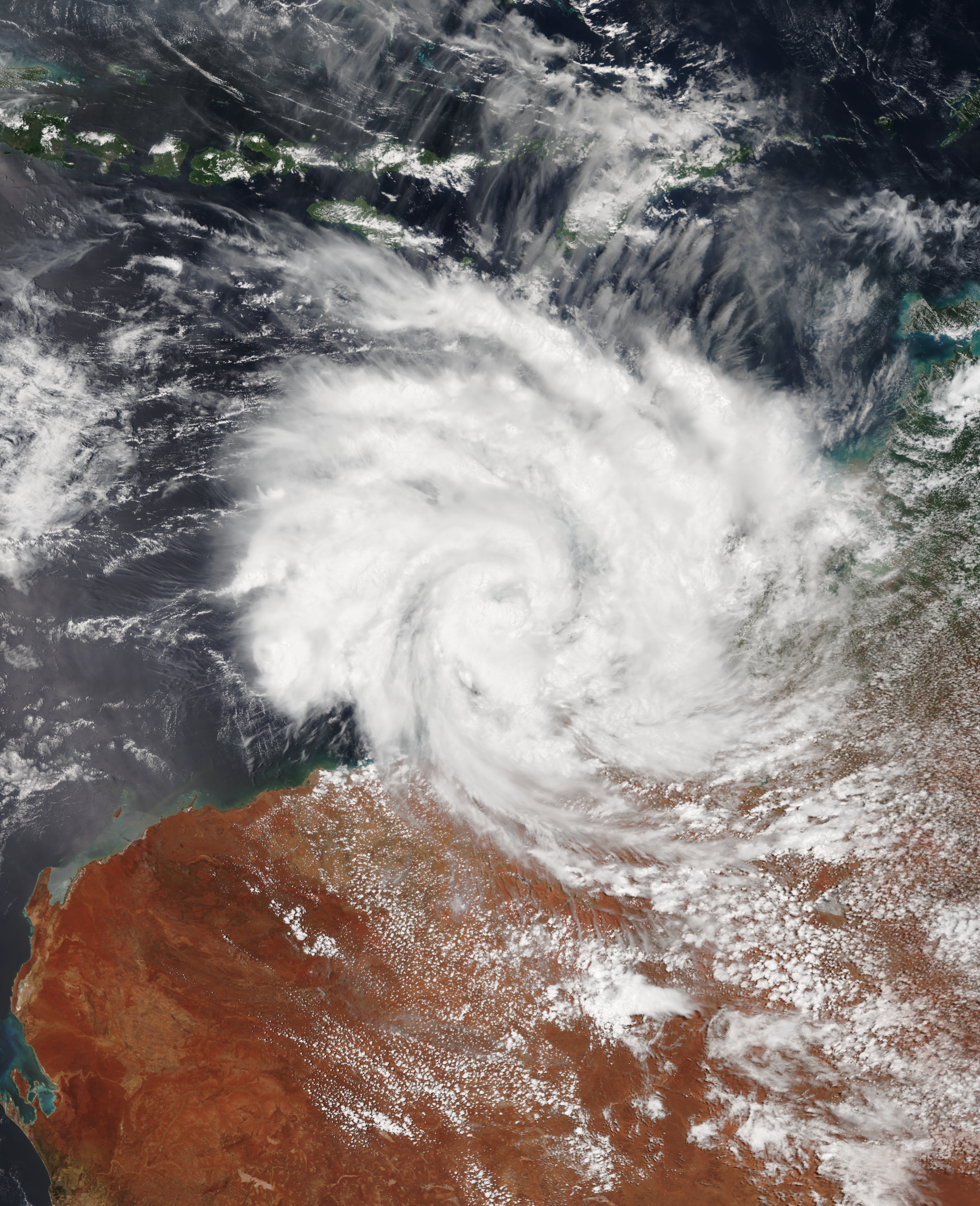
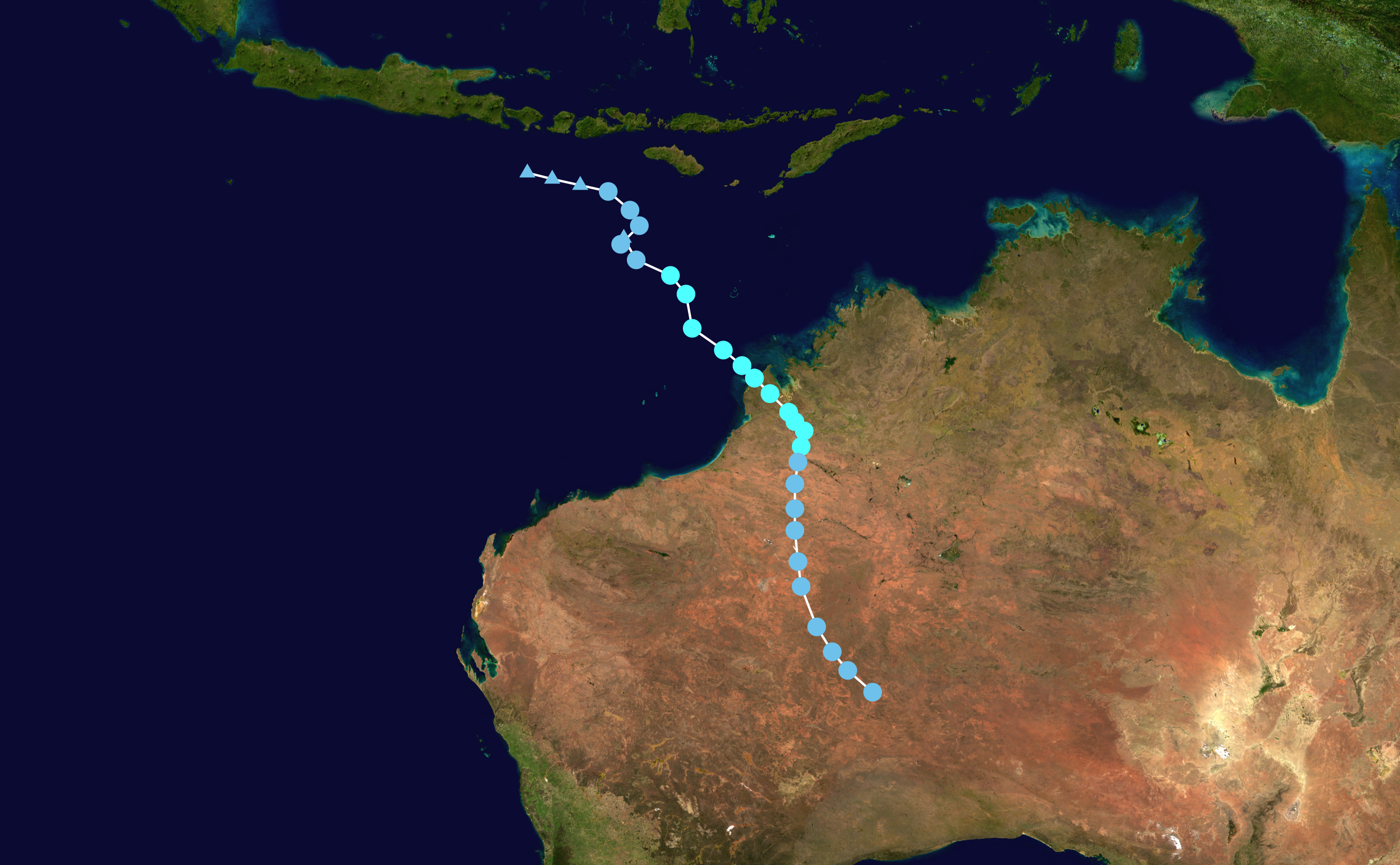
- Duration: 21 January – 25 January
- Peak intensity: 95 km/h (60 mph) (10-min); 985 hPa (mbar)

On 21 January, the Bureau of Meteorology (BoM) began to issue advisories on a tropical low that formed in the Eastern Indian Ocean south of Indonesia. The low began to intensify while moving southeast toward the Kimberley coast. Early on 23 January, the Joint Typhoon Warning Center (JTWC) initiated advisories on the system, designating it as Tropical Cyclone 17S and noted that convection was beginning to develop in the northwestern quadrant of the storm. Later that day, the BoM noted that gales were developing in the northern quadrant of the system and upgraded the low to a category 1 tropical cyclone on the Australian scale, and assigned the name Luana. The following day, the JTWC noted that Luana was beginning to rapidly intensify, with an eye like feature appearing on satellite imagery and rain bands wrapping around the center of the system. Subsequently, the BoM upgraded Luana to category 2 tropical cyclone as it made landfall between Beagle Bay and Cape Leveque. Luana then weakened to a tropical low the next day as it continued to move inland. However, the system was able to maintain its tropical characteristics due to a possible brown ocean effect. Luana then dissipated on 29 January.

Tropical cyclone warnings were issued between Broome and Kuri Bay, and adjacent inland areas. A weather station at Lombardina recorded a gust of 106 kilometres per hour (66 mph). The storm caused significant structural damage to the Mercedes Cove Exclusive Coastal Retreat, where buildings were unroofed and debris was scattered. In Derby, approximately 70 customers lost power, and State Emergency Service (SES) volunteers, assisted by minimum-security prisoners from the West Kimberley Regional Prison, responded to numerous calls for fallen trees blocking homes and roads. There were twelve reports of trees that fell on homes. Rainfall was exceptionally heavy across the region. Derby recorded 191.2 millimetres (7.53 in) of rain in a 24-hour period, while Lombardina reported a three-day total of 272.2 millimetres (10.72 in). These rains led to the closure of several major transport routes, including the Gibb River Road and Cape Leveque Road. As the remnants of Luana tracked southwards towards the Goldfields and Eucla districts, flood watches were maintained for the Salt Lake and Nullarbor river catchments. Losses totaled to AU$2.4 million (US$1.72 million).

=== Severe Tropical Cyclone Mitchell ===
- Category 3 severe tropical cyclone (Australian scale)
- Category 2 tropical cyclone (SSHWS)
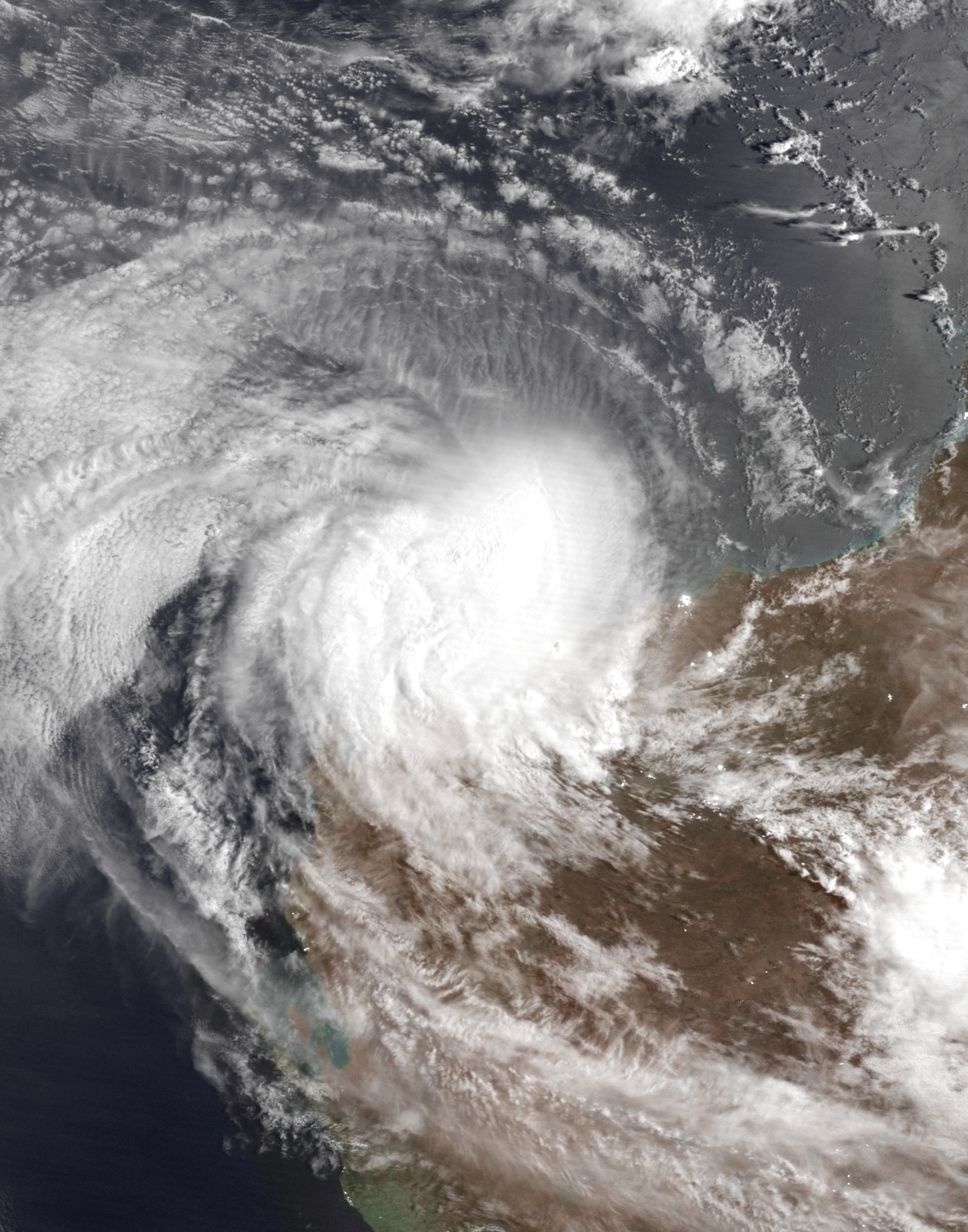
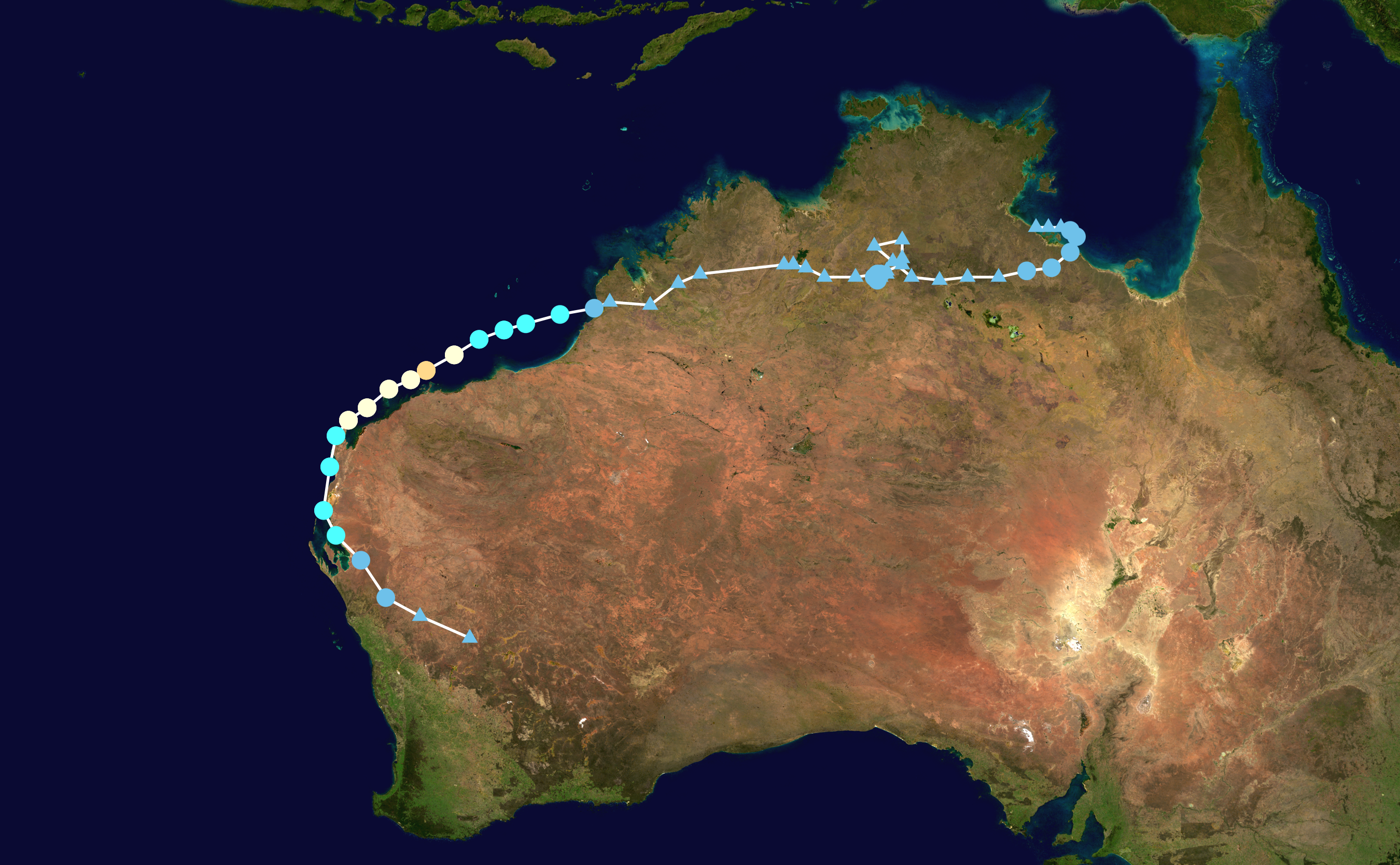
- Duration: 29 January – 9 February
- Peak intensity: 140 km/h (85 mph) (10-min); 963 hPa (mbar)

On 29 January, a tropical low, designated as Tropical Low 21U by the Bureau of Meteorology (BoM), formed over the western coast of the Gulf of Carpentaria and began to move westward across Kimberly. Early on 6 February, the low moved offshore Broome, the Joint Typhoon Warning Center (JTWC) initiated advisories on the system, designating it as Tropical Cyclone 20S and noting that deep convection was beginning to develop within its northern and western quadrants. Later that day, the BoM noted that the low was intensifying and upgraded it to a category 1 tropical cyclone on the Australian scale and assigned the name Mitchell. Mitchell then began to move west-southwest, paralleling the Pilbara coastline while continuing to intensify. The JTWC noted that Mitchell was beginning to rapidly intensify, with an eye-like feature beginning to appear on satellite imagery.

The following day, the BoM upgraded Mitchell to a category 3 tropical cyclone. Early the next day, the JTWC observed that Mitchell began to weaken, with wind shear and drier air impinging upon the centre of circulation. The BoM then downgraded Mitchell to a category 2 tropical cyclone while it began to skirt the North West Cape and turning south. The following day, the BoM downgraded Mitchell to a category 1 tropical cyclone while it continued its southward trajectory, skirting the upper west coast. The JTWC noted that wind shear was causing the convection to displace to the south of its centre of circulation. Mitchell then made landfall south of Carnarvon, with the BoM downgrading it to a tropical low later that day. The low then dissipated the next day.

Prior to being upgraded to a category 1 tropical cyclone, Mitchell dropped heavy rainfall across the Northern Territory, causing to Daly River to swell to 14.26 metres (46.8 ft) and forcing the evacuation of 250 residents. Uprooted trees, damaged street signs, and minor flooding were reported as Mitchell paralleled the Pilbara coast. Shark Bay recorded up to 103.6 millimetres (4.08 in) of rain and Legendre Island recorded a maximum wind gust of 169 kilometres per hour (105 mph). Banana farmers lost around half of their crops. Remnant moisture from Mitchell fueled severe thunderstorms in the Wheatbelt and Goldfields regions. Strong winds ripped doors off of buildings and caused a few silos to collapse. In Exmouth, nearly 2,000 properties were left without power. Emergency services reported around twenty calls involving property damage and requests for assistance. Additionally, the closure of ports from the cyclone temporarily disrupted iron ore exports. Losses totaled to AU$11.3 million (US$8.11 million).

=== Tropical Low 28U ===
- Tropical low (Australian scale)
- Tropical storm (SSHWS)
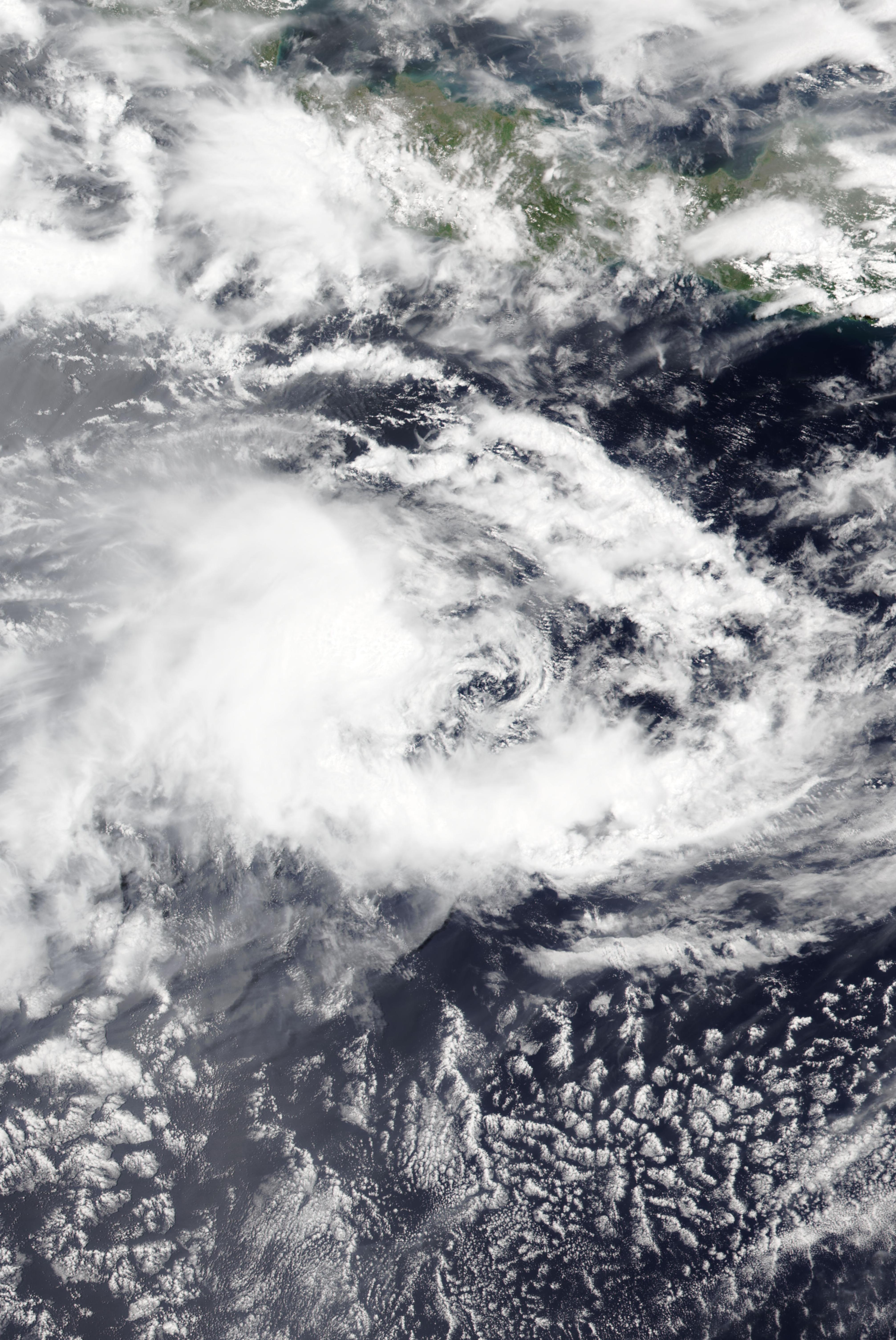
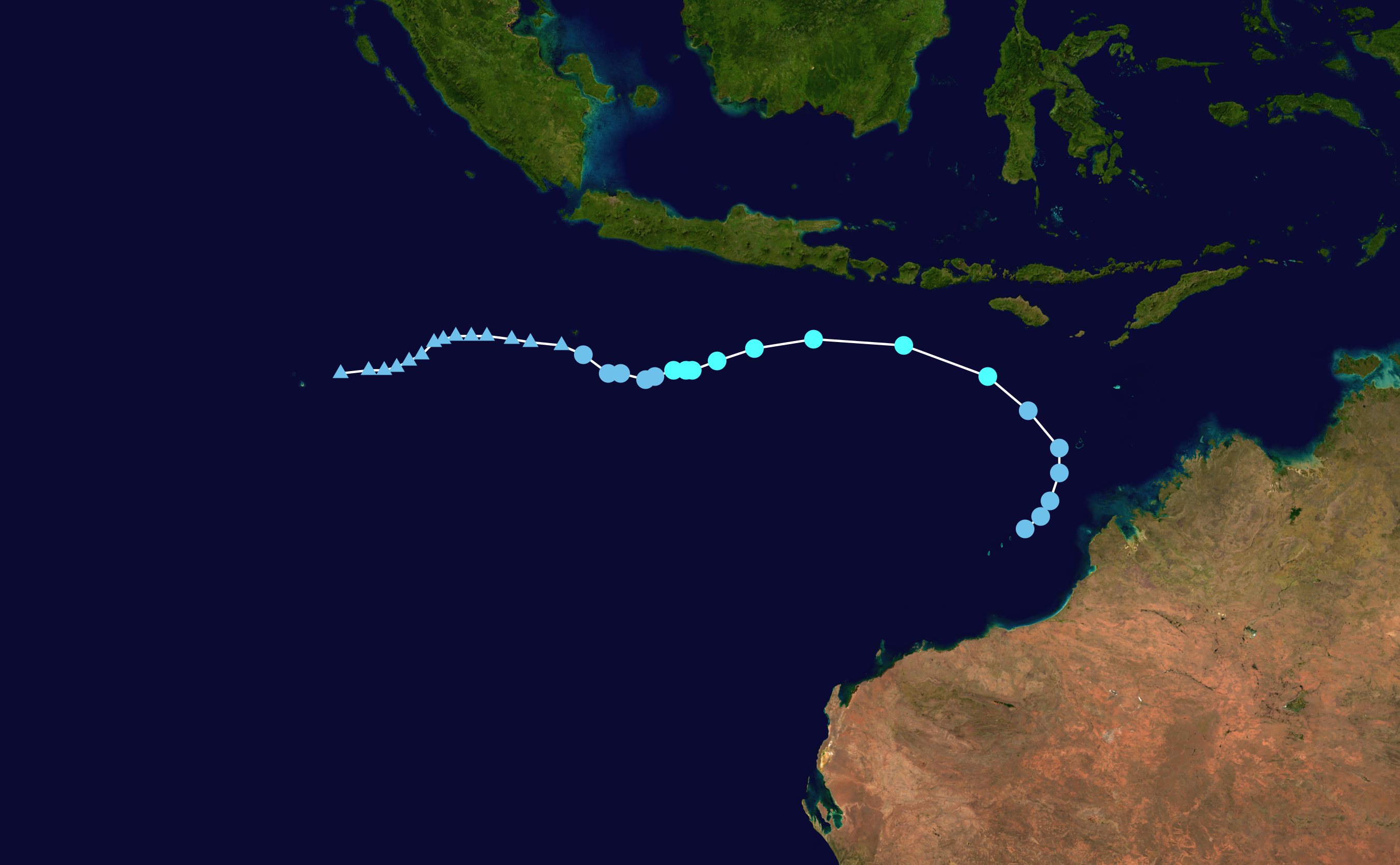
- Duration: 28 February – 6 March
- Peak intensity: 85 km/h (50 mph) (10-min); 990 hPa (mbar)

On 1 March, tropical low 28U formed in the southeastern Indian Ocean, around 450km west southwest of Christmas Island. The system passed to the south of Christmas Island on 2 March, tracking east southeast, then strengthening south of Indonesia. The JTWC designated the tropical low as Tropical Cyclone 25S on 4 March, albeit only marginal and brief strengthening occurred. Thereafter, the tropical low began interacting with 30U, accelerating it to the east, before weakening and dissipating west of Broome on 7 March.

=== Tropical Low 29U ===
- Tropical low (Australian scale)
- Tropical storm (SSHWS)
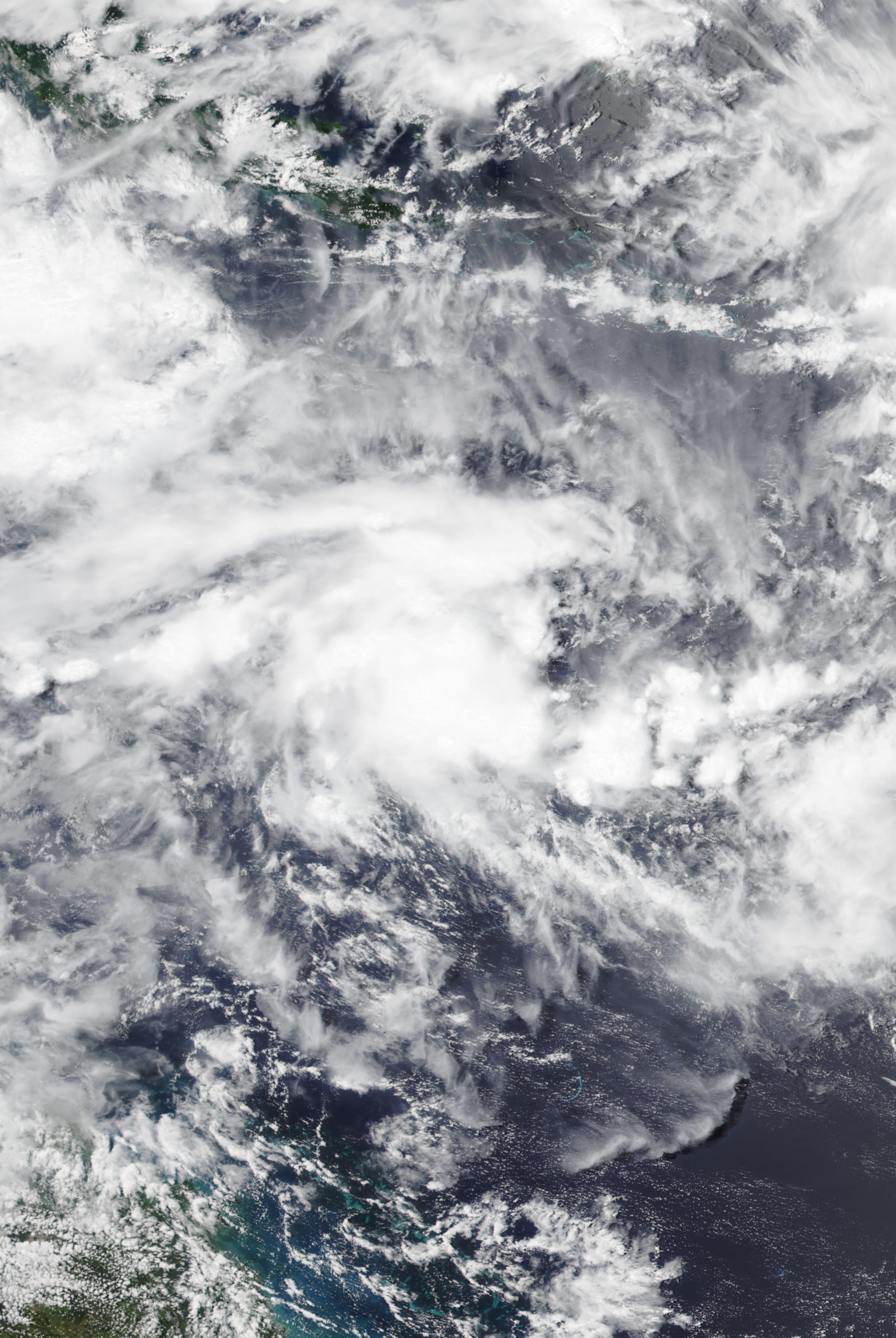
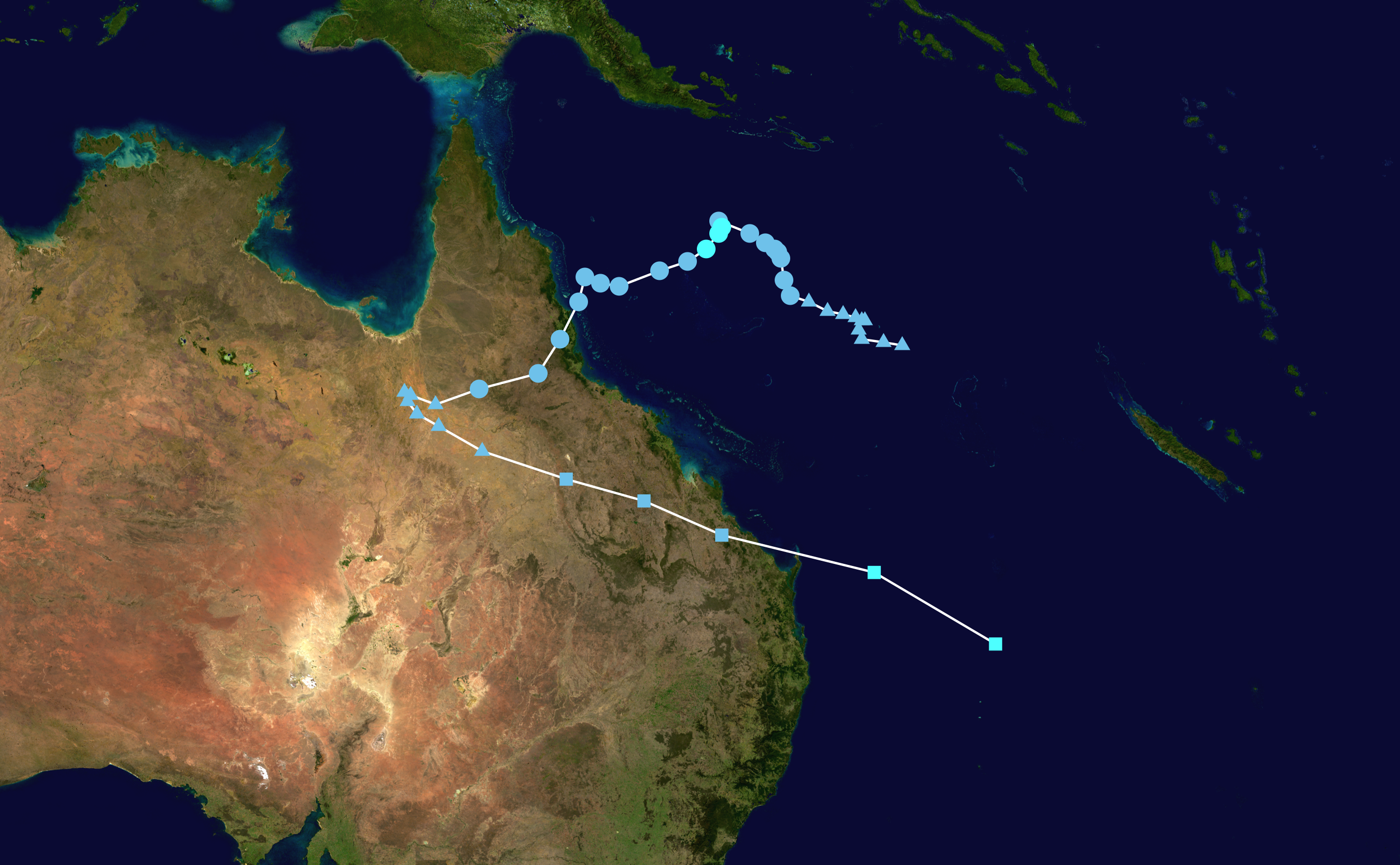
- Duration: 2 March – 6 March
- Peak intensity: 65 km/h (40 mph) (10-min); 995 hPa (mbar)

The Bureau of Meteorology began monitoring Tropical Low 29U on 1 March. On 4 March, the tropical low began showing signs of organization and was designated as Tropical Cyclone 24P by the Joint Typhoon Warning Center (JTWC). It then strengthened briefly, but this development was short-lived. Wind shear and other environmental factors inhibited continued growth of the system, and the system dissipated on 6 March. On 8 March the system exited land and redeveloped into a subtropical storm as it raced eastward.

=== Tropical Low 30U ===
- Tropical low (Australian scale)
- Tropical storm (SSHWS)
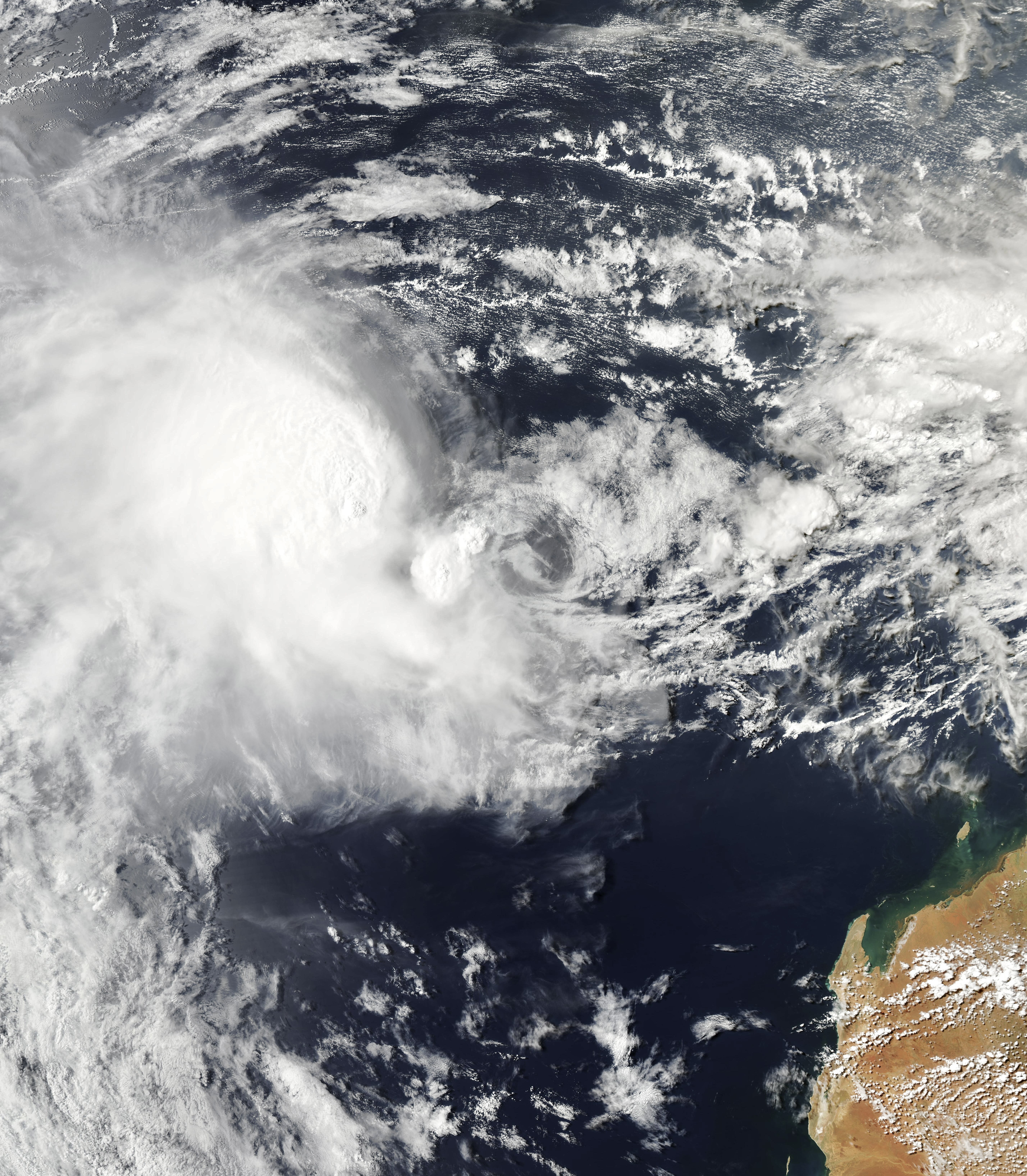
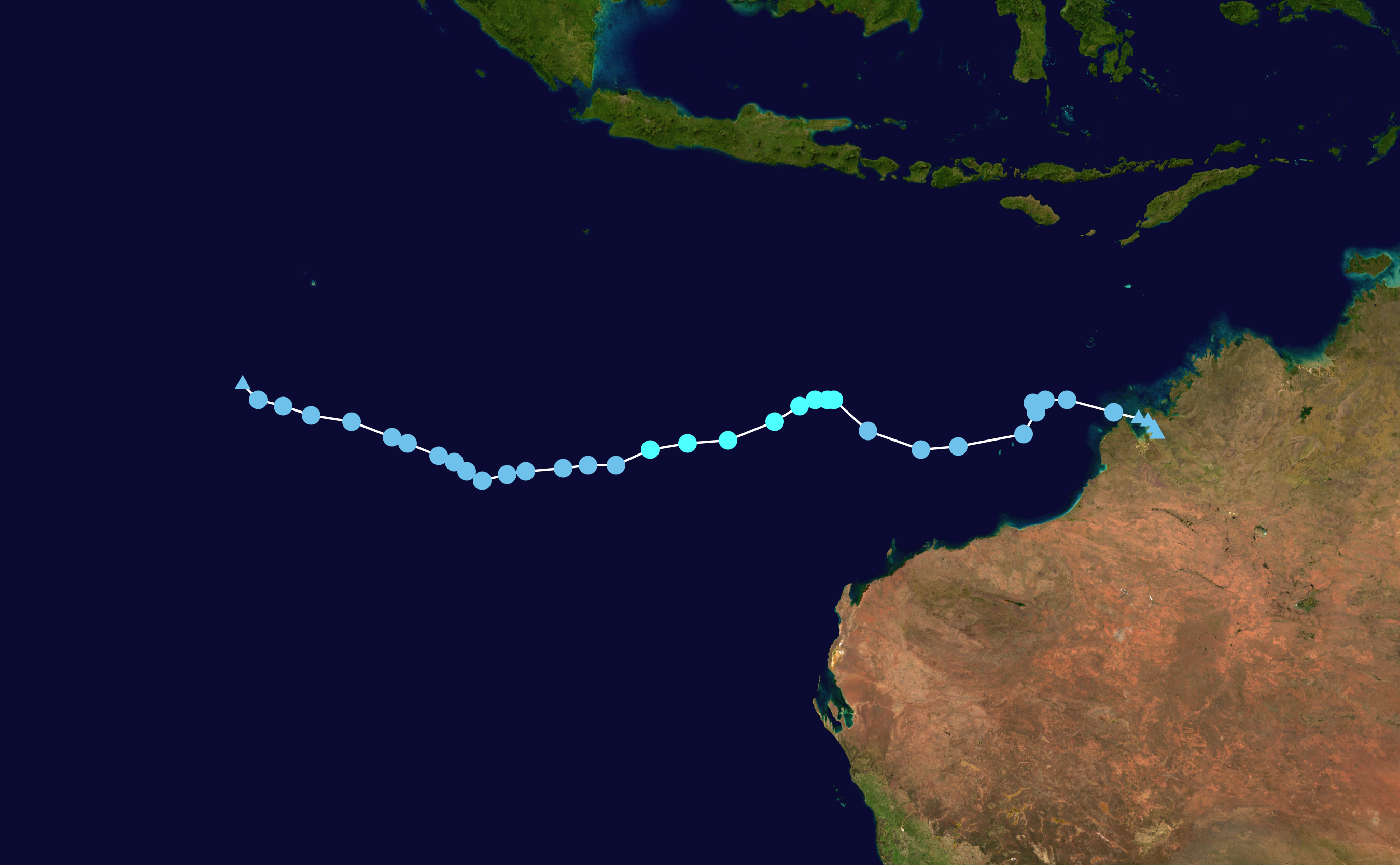
- Duration: 4 March – 8 March
- Peak intensity: 65 km/h (40 mph) (10-min); 992 hPa (mbar)

Tropical Low 30U developed off the Kimberley coast, travelling west, guided by a mid-level high pressure ridge south of the low. Gales developed within the western half of the storm on 6 March, and the Joint Typhoon Warning Center designated the system Tropical Cyclone 26S. It interacted with the neighboring 28U during 5-6 March, accelerating the system northwestwards, until 28U weakened, allowing 30U to continue tracking west. The system began to weaken on 8 March, losing its gale-force winds, and it ultimately dissipated on 12 March.

=== Severe Tropical Cyclone Narelle ===
- Category 5 severe tropical cyclone (Australian scale)
- Category 4 tropical cyclone (SSHWS)
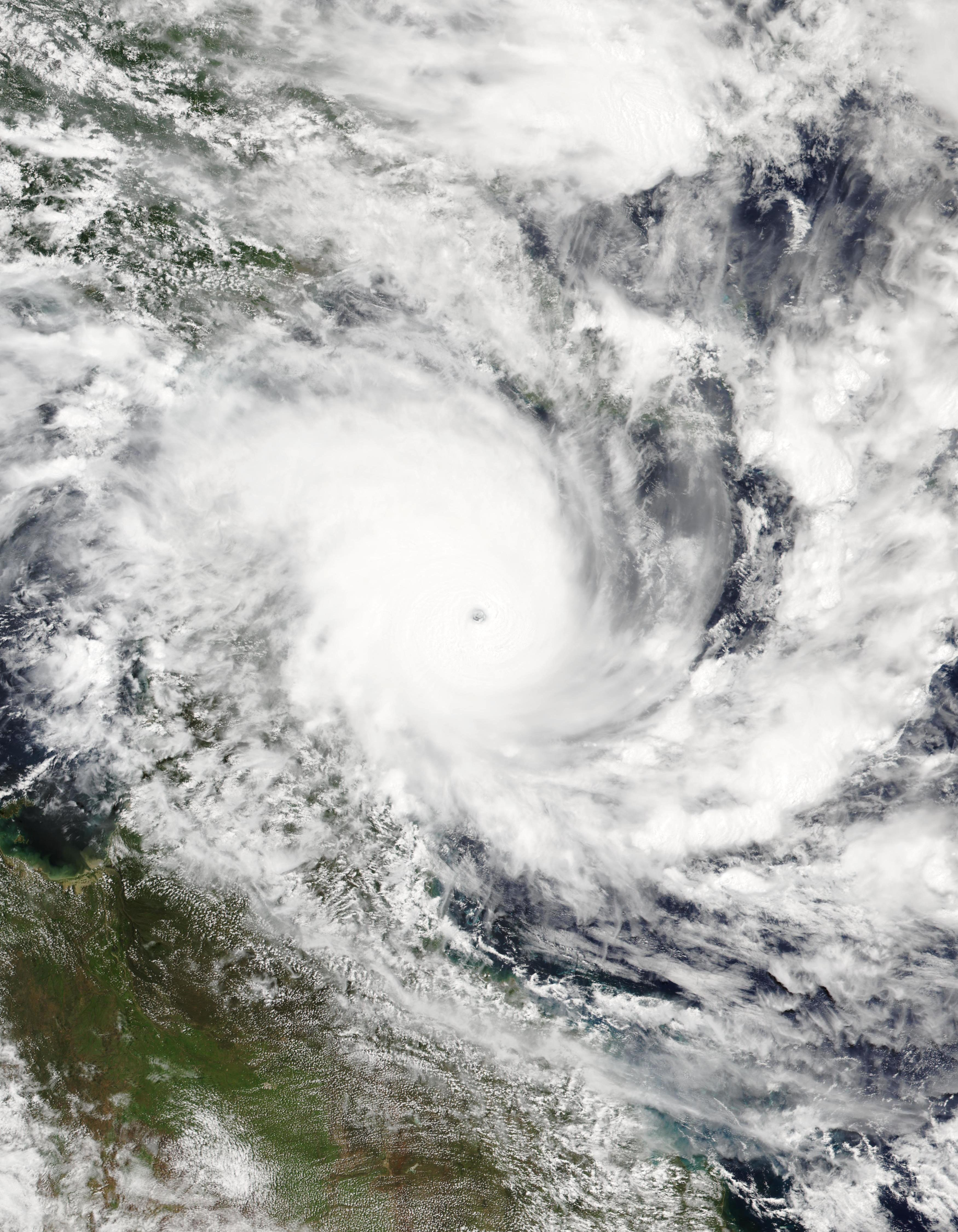
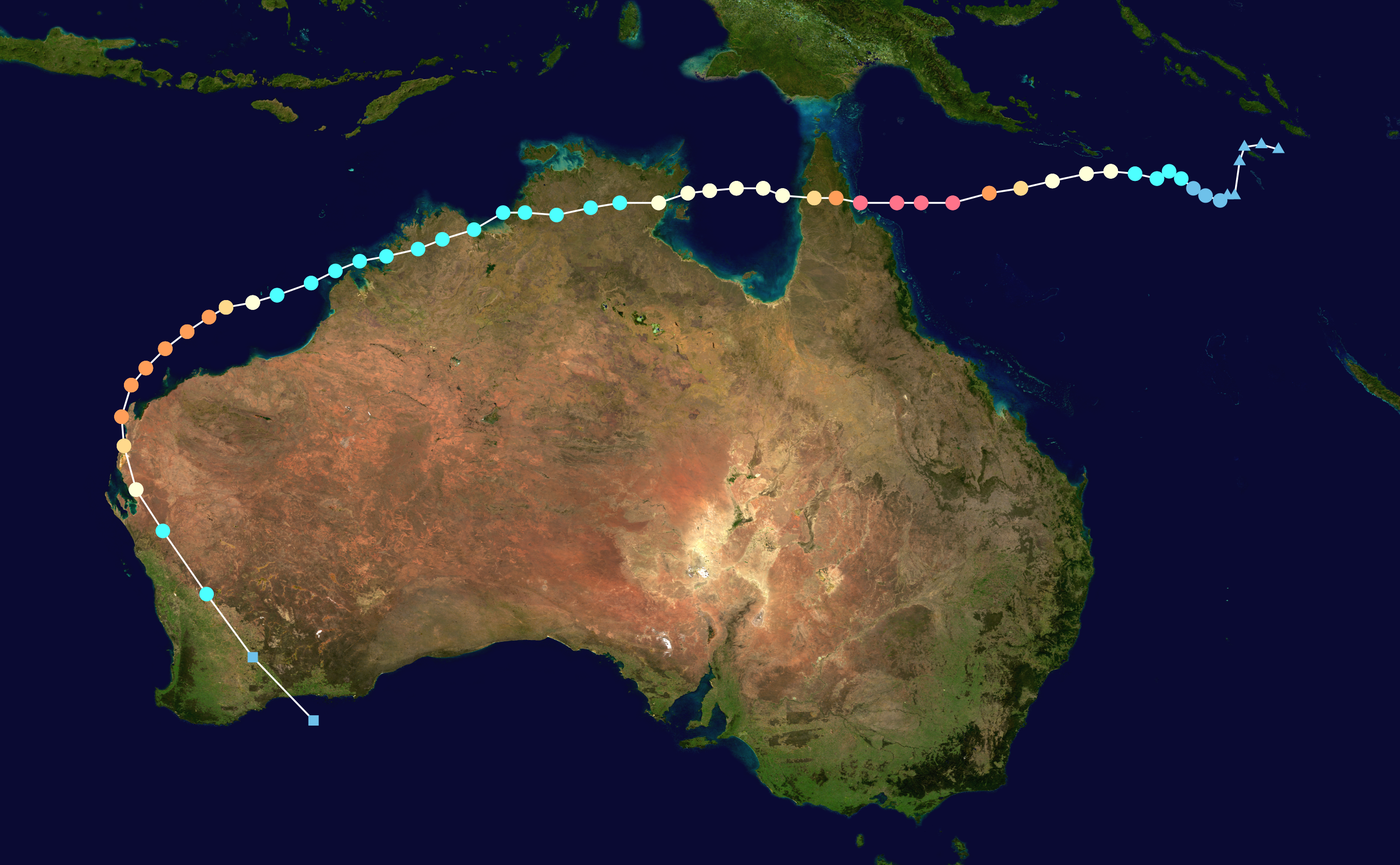
- Duration: 15 March – 27 March
- Peak intensity: 215 km/h (130 mph) (10-min); 931 hPa (mbar)

Late on 9 March, the BoM began to forecast a tropical low forming in the eastern Coral Sea in the following 7 days, and pre-designated it as 34U. This came to fruition five days later, when the bureau reported that it had developed to the south of the Solomon Islands. The JTWC began monitoring the low the same day, as it was in a favorable environment of warm sea surface temperatures, good poleward outflow aloft and moderate wind shear. By 16 March, the JTWC issued a TCFA on 34U, as its centre continued organizing with persisting convection over it. It later began issuing warnings on the system the next day, designating it 27P, before the BoM reported that it had strengthened into a Category 1 tropical cyclone on the Australian scale, naming it Narelle. The same day, it quickly intensified into a Category 2, with the BoM anticipating further intensification. By 18 March, the cyclone was upgraded to a Category 3 severe tropical cyclone, with the Bureau forecasting a peak at Category 5 strength. On 19 March, the cyclone was upgraded to Category 5 severe tropical cyclone strength by the Bureau of Meteorology, after wind speeds of 200 kilometres per hour (120 mph; 110 kn) were observed. The following day, it made landfall on far north Queensland as a high-end Category 4-equivalent tropical cyclone on the Australian scale. Narelle then made a second landfall just to the north-northeast of Point Arrowsmith on the western side of the Gulf of Carpentaria late the next day, as a Category 3 cyclone on the Australian scale. Narelle would weaken to a tropical low for the next few days while it traversed across northwestern Australia, emerging off the Indian Ocean coast on 24 March. Almost immediately, Narelle began to restrengthen. By 26 March, it once again became a Category 4 cyclone on the Australian scale as it neared the North West Cape, weakening to Category 3 status upon passing the peninsula. On 27 March, Narelle made landfall south of Coral Bay at that intensity, or Category 2 on the Saffir-Simpson scale. Over Western Australia, the storm created a haze of red sky as it lifted iron rich dust into the air. Shortly thereafter, it weakened to a tropical low as it moved further inland, and begun its transition into an extratropical cyclone.

Rainfall up to 400 millimetres (16 in) was reported across portions of the Cape York Peninsula while wind gusts up to 115 kilometres per hour (71 mph) were recorded in Lockhart River. Ergon Energy estimated that 3,000 properties lost power due to strong winds from Narelle. In Aurukun, a barbecue shelter was damaged by a fallen tree. Telstra reported that four cell sites had been knocked offline by Narelle. Premier of Queensland David Crisafulli reported that several roads were damaged by the cyclone. Emergency services responded to 20 calls for assistance. Two people were rescued from floodwaters. Following the cyclone, 50 lineworkers were mobilized to restore power and sixteen rural communities were surveyed for damage. In Northern Territory, four residents evacuated their flooded homes. Around 500 people were displaced as a result of the flooding. Aon estimated that losses from Narelle totaled to US$120 million.

=== Severe Tropical Cyclone Maila ===
- Category 5 severe tropical cyclone (Australian scale)
- Category 4 tropical cyclone (SSHWS)
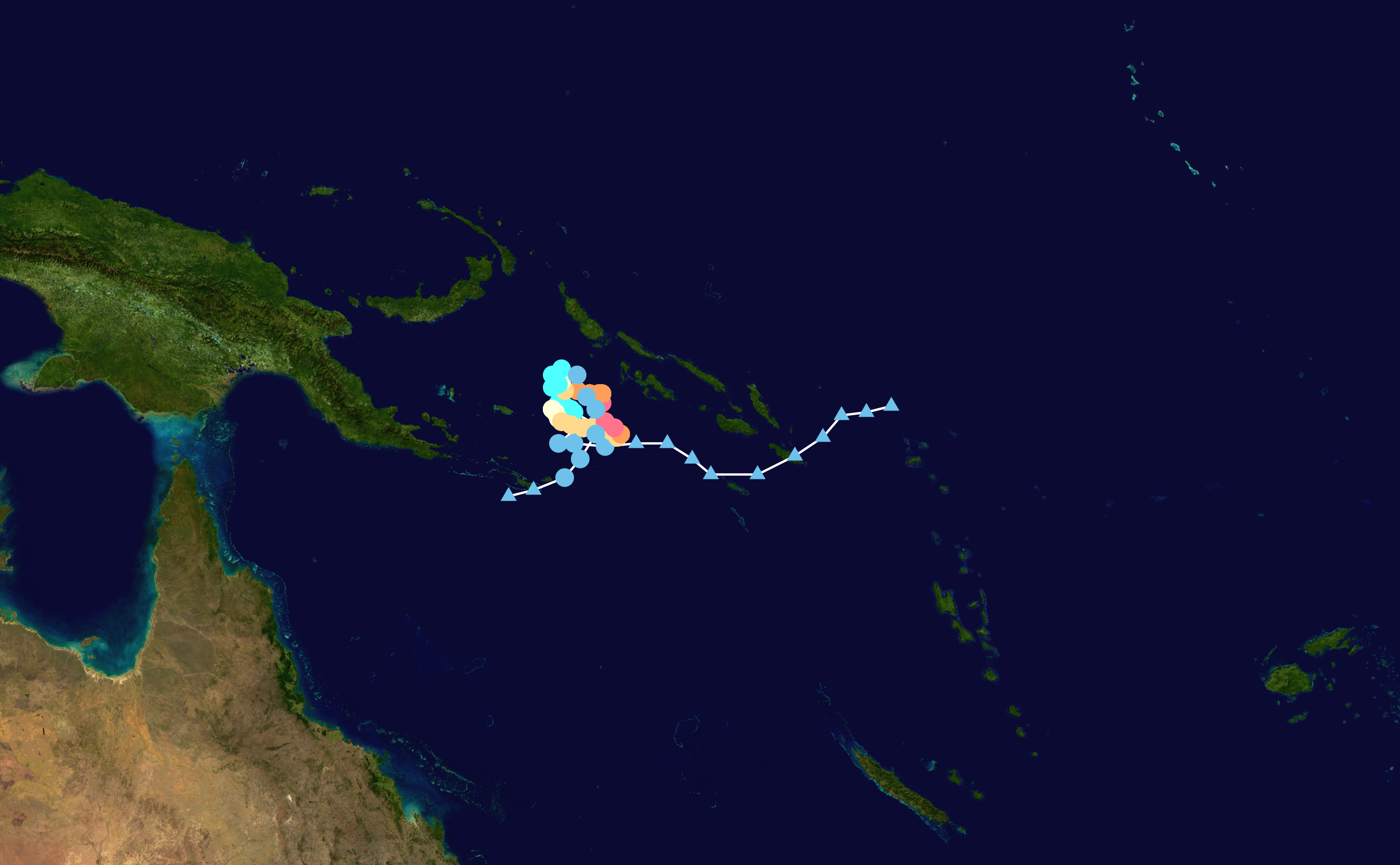
- Duration: 1 April – 11 April
- Peak intensity: 205 km/h (125 mph) (10-min); 929 hPa (mbar)

On 2 April, Tropical Low 37U formed in the northeastern Coral Sea, between Papua New Guinea and the Solomon Islands. On 4 April, the system crossed 155°E into the area of responsibility of TCWC Port Moresby and was given the name Maila. Maila was the first tropical cyclone to be named by TCWC Port Moresby since Cyclone Guba in 2007. Rapid strengthening and gradual northwestward movement occurred throughout the remainder of the day. By 5 April, Maila reached Category 3 status on the Australian scale, or Category 1 on the Saffir-Simpson scale. Cyclone Maila brought strong winds and heavy rain to the Solomon Islands' Western Province, with the Australian Bureau of Meteorology reporting winds of 130 km per hour near the centre with wind gusts to 185 km per hour. By this point, Maila's intensification would slow down and begin to fluctuate for the next two days as it drifted slowly to the east. Intensification resumed on 7 April where it was upgraded to a Category 4 cyclone on the Australian scale, or Category 3 on the Saffir-Simpson scale. The next morning, Maila was upgraded to a Category 5 cyclone on the Australian scale and Category 4 on the Saffir-Simpson scale, with winds of 215 kilometres per hour near the centre and wind gusts to 295 kilometres per hour being reported. Then, due to upwelling and the cyclone stalling in one area, it weakened quickly, all the way down to a tropical depression until it died out and became a remnant low on April 10.

In preparation for the approach of Maila, TCWC Port Moresby issued a tropical cyclone advisory at 15:00 local time on 3 April followed by a tropical cyclone warning at midnight on 5 April through social media. There were 26 deaths related to the storm in Papua New Guinea.

=== Other systems ===
- Tropical Low 07U formed over the Arafura Sea on 15 December. It continued to move erratically until 29 December, when it promptly degenerated just over the Northern Territory. The system produced rainfall exceeding 100 mm in the Gulf of Carpentaria, including 148mm at Centre Island. 07U caused a man to drown in his vehicle due to flooding at Normanton on 30 December and caused stock losses of over 100,000 cattle.
- Tropical Low 14U formed near the Solomon Islands on 12 January. It left the Australian region and moved into the South Pacific on 19 January, being redesignated as 05F by the Fiji Meteorological Service.
- Tropical Low 15U formed near the coast of Western Australia on 14 January, and was given a low chance of developing into a tropical cyclone. The Bureau of Meteorology ceased tracking the system on 16 January.
- On 21 January, the JTWC began monitoring Tropical Cyclone 16P in the far eastern reaches of the basin. Hours later, it moved into the South Pacific, where it was classified as Tropical Depression 06F.
- Tropical Low 17U formed in Coral Sea on 22 January. However, it dissipated over the open ocean late at night, on the same day. On 27 January, 17U’s remnants regenerated and became Tropical Depression 07F.
- Tropical Low 18U formed in the Gulf of Carpentaria on 22 January. It quickly made landfall on the Cape York Peninsula before dissipating on 24 January. However, on 27 January, the Bureau of Meteorology began tracking a possible redevelopment of the system as it was expected to move back into the Gulf of Carpentaria in the following days. 18U strengthened once again as a tropical low on 29 January and stopped being tracked by BoM on 31 January. Later, its remnant low redeveloped over the Northern Territory. The system caused rainfalls of 300-500 meters, with Daly River being evacuated ahead of forecast major flooding.
- Tropical Low 23U formed in the Coral Sea on 11 February, drifting around with little overall change in position. The BoM stopped tracking the system as it degenerated into a residual disturbance on 13 February.
- Tropical Low 26U led to heavy rainfall exceeding 100 mm in Central Australia, with some areas receiving record–breaking rainfalls, having a significant impact on grape growers. Several weather stations recorded in excess of 500 mm, with one property owner reporting over 600 mm of rain.
- Tropical Low 31U formed in the Gulf of Carpentaria on 1 March. It stalled in the Gulf for a few days until eventually moving over the Northern Territory of Australia on 4 March with winds of around 20 mph and a pressure of about 1000 mbar. The remnants of the system lasted over the Northern Territory for a few hours, bringing heavy rain to Katherine and Daly District and causing flooding problems. Eventually, the system weakened into a monsoon trough on 6 March. Overall, this system remained a low chance for tropical development.
- On 13 April, Tropical Low 38U, which the Bureau of Meteorology had been monitoring for over a week by then, formed roughly 200km to the north of the Cocos (Keeling) Islands whilst moving due westward. The next day, the Joint Typhoon Warning Center began tracking the low pressure area. However, no further significant development occurred, and the system dissipated on 16 April.

== Storm names ==
=== Bureau of Meteorology ===
The Australian Bureau of Meteorology (TCWC Melbourne) monitors all tropical cyclones that form within the Australian region, including any within the areas of responsibility of TCWC Jakarta or TCWC Port Moresby. Should a tropical low reach tropical cyclone strength within the BoM's area of responsibility, it will be assigned the next name from the following naming list. The names Hayley, Jenna and Luana were used for the first time this season, after replacing Heidi, Jasmine and Lua respectively, from the 2011–12 season. The names that were used this season are listed below:

- Fina
- Grant
- Hayley
- Iggy
- Jenna
- Koji
- Luana
- Mitchell
- Narelle

=== TCWC Jakarta ===
TCWC Jakarta monitors tropical cyclones from the equator to 11°S and from 90°E to 145°E. Bakung was the only name used from this list this season.

- Bakung

=== TCWC Port Moresby ===
Tropical cyclones that develop north of 11°S between 151°E and 160°E are assigned names by the Tropical Cyclone Warning Centre in Port Moresby, Papua New Guinea. Tropical cyclone formation in this area is rare, with Maila being the first named cyclone in the region since 2007.

- Maila

==== Retirement ====
After the season, the name Maila was automatically retired from the Port Moresby's naming list. Maila was replaced with Paia. The name Dodo was removed for unknown reasons and was replaced with Nou.

For the Australian list the names Fina and Narelle were retired. They were replaced with Freya and Nikita respectively.

== Season effects ==
This table lists all of the tropical cyclones and subtropical cyclones that were monitored during the 2025–2026 Australian region cyclone season. Information on their intensity, duration, name, areas affected, primarily comes from RSMC Australia. Death and damage reports come from either press reports or the relevant national disaster management agency while the damage totals are given in 2025 or 2026 USD.

2025–26 Australian region cyclone season
Name	Dates	Peak intensity			Areas affected	Damage (US$)	Deaths
Name	Dates	Category	Wind speed (km/h (mph))	Pressure (hPa)	Areas affected	Damage (US$)	Deaths
TL	15–16 Jul	Tropical low	55 (35)	1003	None	None	0
Fina	15–25 Nov	Category 4 severe tropical cyclone	195 (120)	938	Timor-Leste, Indonesia (Lesser Sunda Islands), Tiwi Islands, Northern Territory, Kimberley	60.3 million	0
Bakung	10–17 Dec	Category 4 severe tropical cyclone	165 (105)	957	Indonesia (Sumatra)	None	0
07U	14 Dec – 2 Jan	Tropical low	Not specified	1005	Northern Territory (particularly East Arnhem, Katherine), Far North Queensland	Minor	1
Grant	15–27 Dec	Category 2 tropical cyclone	100 (65)	986	Indonesia (Java), Christmas Island, Cocos Islands (Before crossover)	Minor	0
Hayley	27–30 Dec	Category 4 severe tropical cyclone	165 (105)	953	Indonesia (Lesser Sunda Islands), Western Australia (particularly Kimberley, Rowley Shoals) Northern Territory	1.72 million	0
Iggy	31 Dec – 1 Jan	Category 1 tropical cyclone	75 (45)	997	Indonesia (Sumatra, Java), Christmas Island	None	0
Jenna	3–8 Jan	Category 4 severe tropical cyclone	165 (105)	967	Cocos Islands (Before crossover)	Minor	0
Koji	7–11 Jan	Category 2 tropical cyclone	100 (65)	987	Papua New Guinea, Coral Sea Islands, Queensland	38.4 million	0
14U	12–19 Jan	Tropical low	Not specified	993	Solomon Islands (Before crossover)	Unknown	0
15U	14–16 Jan	Tropical low	Not specified	1004	None	None	0
Luana	21–25 Jan	Category 2 tropical cyclone	95 (60)	985	Indonesia (Lesser Sunda Islands), Northern Territory (particularly Western Top End), Ashmore and Cartier Islands, Western Australia (particularly Rowley Shoals, Kimberley, Pilbara, Goldfields–Esperance)	1.72 million	0
17U	22 Jan	Tropical low	Not specified	1002	Coral Sea Islands (Before crossover)	None	0
18U	22–31 Jan	Tropical low	Not specified	998	Queensland, Northern Territory (particularly Top End)	Minor	0
Mitchell	29 Jan – 9 Feb	Category 3 severe tropical cyclone	140 (85)	963	Northern Territory, Western Australia	8.11 million	0
23U	11–13 Feb	Tropical low	Not specified	1001	Coral Sea Islands	None	0
26U	19 Feb – 4 Mar	Tropical low	Not specified	989	Northern Territory, Queensland, South Australia, New South Wales, Victoria	Unknown	0
28U	28 Feb – 6 Mar	Tropical low	85 (50)	990	Cocos Islands, Christmas Island, Indonesia (Lesser Sunda Islands), Ashmore and Cartier Islands	None	0
31U	1–6 Mar	Tropical low	Not specified	997	Far North Queensland, Northern Territory	Minor	0
29U	2–6 Mar	Tropical low	65 (40)	995	Coral Sea Islands, Queensland, New South Wales (particularly Northern Rivers, Lord Howe Island), Norfolk Island	Minor	0
30U	4–8 Mar	Tropical low	65 (40)	992	Western Australia (particularly Kimberley, Rowley Shoals)	None	0
Narelle	15–27 Mar	Category 5 severe tropical cyclone	215 (130)	931	Solomon Islands, Papua New Guinea, Coral Sea Islands, Queensland (particularly Cape York Peninsula), Northern Territory, Western Australia	120 million	0
Maila	1–11 Apr	Category 5 severe tropical cyclone	205 (125)	929	Solomon Islands, Papua New Guinea	Unknown	26
38U	13–16 Apr	Tropical low	Not specified	1007	Cocos Islands	None	0
Season aggregates
24 systems	15 Jul – 16 Apr		215 (130)	929		230 million	27

== See also ==
- Weather of 2025 and 2026
- List of Southern Hemisphere cyclone seasons
- Tropical cyclones in 2025, 2026
- Atlantic hurricane seasons: 2025, 2026
- Pacific hurricane seasons: 2025, 2026
- Pacific typhoon seasons: 2025, 2026
- North Indian Ocean cyclone seasons: 2025, 2026
- 2025–26 South-West Indian Ocean cyclone season
- 2025–26 South Pacific cyclone season
