= Capes of the Kimberley coastline of Western Australia =

Location of the Kimberley region in Western Australia

Capes of Kimberley coastline of Western Australia are located along the Kimberley coastline of Western Australia from the border with the Northern Territory in the north east of the Kimberley land region around to south of Broome.

Cape	Headland or related feature in vicinity	Notes
Domett	Cambridge Gulf	
Dussejour	Cambridge Gulf	
Barnier		
Rulhieres		
Londonderry		
Talbot		
