= Kimberley coastline (Western Australia) =

Northern coastal region in Western Australia

Context of the Kimberley coast with the rest of the Western Australian Coastline

Kimberley coastline (Western Australia) is a coastal region at the ocean edges of the Kimberley land region in the northern part of Western Australia.

It commences at the border with Northern Territory and ends at Wallal where the Pilbara Coast commences.

It is over 12,000 km in length, and has more than 2,500 islands adjacent, with archipelagoes, and a wide range of features not found in the more southern sections of the Western Australian coastline.

Apart from access at Broome, One Arm Point, Derby, and Wyndham there are few points along the length of the coastline that can be accessed easily or safely. As a result of the difficulty of access, tourism ventures by boat and air have exploited the isolated coastal features.

The Makassan name for the Kimberley coast region (specifically from Napier Broome Bay to Cape Leveque) is Kayu Jawa or Kai Jawa (English: Javanese Wood), derived from a type of mangrove tree which bark of which gives beche-de-mer, a makassan food staple, its distinctive red colour.

== See also ==
- Capes of the Kimberley coastline of Western Australia
- Islands of the Kimberley (Western Australia)
- Northwest Shelf Province
- Northwest Shelf Transition
