= Ruth =

Ruth (or its variants) may refer to:

== Places ==
=== France ===
- Château de Ruthie, castle in the commune of Aussurucq in the Pyrénées-Atlantiques département of France

=== Switzerland ===
- Ruth, a hamlet in Cologny

=== United States ===
- Ruth, Alabama
- Ruth, Arkansas
- Ruth, California
- Ruth, Louisiana
- Ruth, Kentucky
- Ruth, Michigan
- Ruth, Mississippi
- Ruth, Nevada
- Ruth, North Carolina
- Ruth, West Virginia

=== In space ===
- Ruth (lunar crater), crater on the Moon
- Ruth (Venusian crater), crater on Venus
- 798 Ruth, asteroid

== People ==
- Ruth (biblical figure)
- Ruth (given name) contains list of namesakes including fictional
- Princess Ruth or Keʻelikōlani, (1826–1883), Hawaiian princess

=== Surname ===
- A. S. Ruth, American politician
- Babe Ruth (1895–1948), American baseball player
- Connie Ruth, American politician
- Earl B. Ruth (1916–1989), American politician
- Elizabeth Ruth, Canadian novelist
- Heidi Ruth (born 1996), American soccer player
- Kristin Ruth, American judge
- Nancy Ruth, Canadian politician
- Hampton Del Ruth (1879–1958), American film actor and producer
- Roy Del Ruth (1893–1961), American film director
- Thomas Del Ruth (born 1942), American cinematographer
- William Chester Ruth (1882–1971), American inventor

=== Code name ===
- Ruth, code name of Pridi Banomyong, former Prime Minister and leader of the Thai underground against the Japanese occupation during World War II

== Art, entertainment, and media ==
=== Films ===
- Citizen Ruth (1996), a movie about abortion in the United States

=== Literature ===
- Ruth (novel), an 1853 novel by Elizabeth Gaskell
- The Book of Ruth (novel), a 1988 novel by Jane Hamilton

=== Music ===
- Ruth (band), American band out of Vancouver, Washington
- Ruth Ruth, American pop punk band
- Ruth (album), by American indie folk group Nana Grizol (2010)

=== Paintings ===
- Ruth (Hayez), an 1853 painting by the Italian artist Francesco Hayez

=== Television ===
- Ruthie on the Telephone, a series aired on the CBS Television network during 1949
- "Ruthie" (BoJack Horseman)

== Bible ==
- Book of Ruth, a book of the Hebrew Bible/Old Testament

== Brands and enterprises ==
- Baby Ruth, candy bar
- Ruth–Aaron pair, two consecutive integers for which the sums of the prime factors of each integer are equal
- Ruth's Chris Steak House, an American restaurant chain

== Other uses ==
- Typhoon Ruth, name of several tropical cyclones worldwide
- Rolandas Kalinauskas RK-5 Ruth, a Lithuanian light aircraft design
- Ruth, one of the unsuccessful tests of the Uranium hydride bomb

== See also ==
- Ruth Island, artificial island off Saint Croix, U.S. Virgin Islands
- Ruth Lake (disambiguation)
