= Cyclone Maila =

Category 5 Australian region severe tropical cyclone in 2026

Severe Tropical Cyclone Maila
- Maila near peak intensity over the Solomon Sea on 7 April

Meteorological history
- Formed: 1 April 2026
- Remnant low: 11 April 2026
- Dissipated: 12 April 2026

Category 5 severe tropical cyclone
- 10-minute sustained (BOM)
- Highest winds: 205 km/h (125 mph)
- Highest gusts: 280 km/h (175 mph)
- Lowest pressure: 929 hPa (mbar); 27.43 inHg

Category 4-equivalent tropical cyclone
- 1-minute sustained (SSHWS/JTWC)
- Highest winds: 230 km/h (145 mph)
- Lowest pressure: 930 hPa (mbar); 27.46 inHg

Overall effects
- Fatalities: 26
- Injuries: 1+
- Damage: Unknown
- Areas affected: Solomon Islands, Papua New Guinea
- Part of the 2025–26 Australian region cyclone season

Severe Tropical Cyclone Maila was a very erratic and exceptionally rare tropical cyclone in the Australian region, becoming the first tropical cyclone to be named by the Tropical Cyclone Warning Center in Port Moresby, Papua New Guinea since Cyclone Guba in 2007. It was also the strongest tropical cyclone in the Port Moresby's area of responsibility in recorded history. (Note: Officially, reliable records of Australian region tropical cyclones began in 1970, according to the Bureau of Meteorology. This was the approximate period when the BoM tracked tropical cyclones via satellite imagery.) Maila was the twenty-third tropical low, eleventh tropical cyclone, and seventh severe tropical cyclone of the 2025–26 Australian region cyclone season. The origins of Maila stemmed from a tropical low, designated 37U by the Bureau of Meteorology, which was first designated on 2 April, located between Papua New Guinea and Solomon Islands. The tropical low crossed the 155th meridian east into Port Moresby's area of responsibility on 4 April, where it would begin to consolidate, being given the name Maila. Later that day and was upgraded to a Category 1 cyclone on the Australian scale. Maila began to quickly strengthen while moving sluggishly and erratically, and by the next day, the cyclone was upgraded to a Category 3 severe tropical cyclone, or a Category 1 on the Saffir-Simpson scale. Over the next few days, Maila would slowly drift eastward whilst maintaining Category 3 status on the Australian scale, by 7 April, the cyclone would resume its intensification, reaching Category 4 status on the Australian scale, or Category 3 on the Saffir-Simpson scale. Its rapid intensification would continue into the next morning, where it achieved Category 5 status on the Australian scale and Category 4 on the Saffir-Simpson scale.

== Meteorological history ==
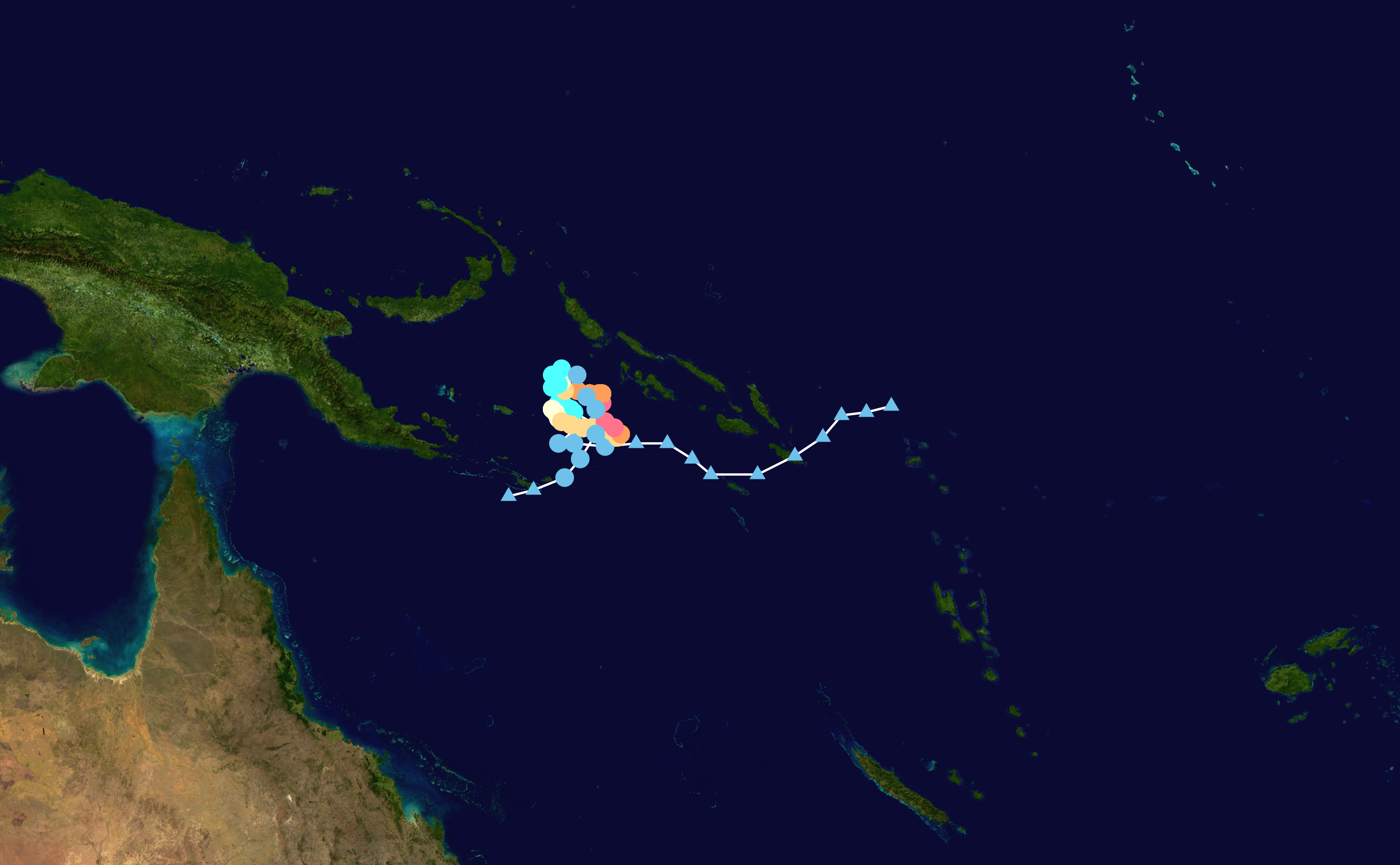
Map plotting the storm's track and intensity, according to the Saffir–Simpson scale. Alternate map Map key Saffir–Simpson scale Tropical depression (≤38 mph, ≤62 km/h) Tropical storm (39–73 mph, 63–118 km/h) Category 1 (74–95 mph, 119–153 km/h) Category 2 (96–110 mph, 154–177 km/h) Category 3 (111–129 mph, 178–208 km/h) Category 4 (130–156 mph, 209–251 km/h) Category 5 (≥157 mph, ≥252 km/h) Unknown Storm type Tropical cyclone Subtropical cyclone Extratropical cyclone, remnant low, tropical disturbance, or monsoon depression

On 2 April, Tropical Low 37U formed in the northeastern Coral Sea, between Papua New Guinea and Solomon Islands. On 4 April, the system crossed 155°E into the area of responsibility of TCWC Port Moresby and developed into Tropical Cyclone Maila. Maila was the first tropical cyclone to be named by TCWC Port Moresby since Cyclone Guba in 2007. Just to the north of the equator, Typhoon Sinlaku formed as a twin cyclone to Maila, forming from the same moisture and wind patterns along with Cyclone Vaianu in the east. Strengthening and gradual northwestward movement occurred throughout the remainder of the day. By 5 April, Maila intensified and reached Category 3 status on the Australian scale, and Category 1 on the Saffir-Simpson scale. Followed by that, Maila's intensification would slow down and begin to fluctuate for the next two days as it drifted to the east. Intensification resumed on 7 April where it was upgraded to a Category 4 cyclone on the Australian scale (Category 3 on the Saffir-Simpson scale). By the next morning, Maila had rapidly intensified into a Category 5 cyclone on the Australian scale (Category 4 on the Saffir-Simpson scale), albeit the eastern periphery of the storm's structure began to become uneven due to its own oceanic upwelling and was eventually reclassified as an ex-tropical cyclone on 11 April, with the cloud tops dissipated after upwelling.

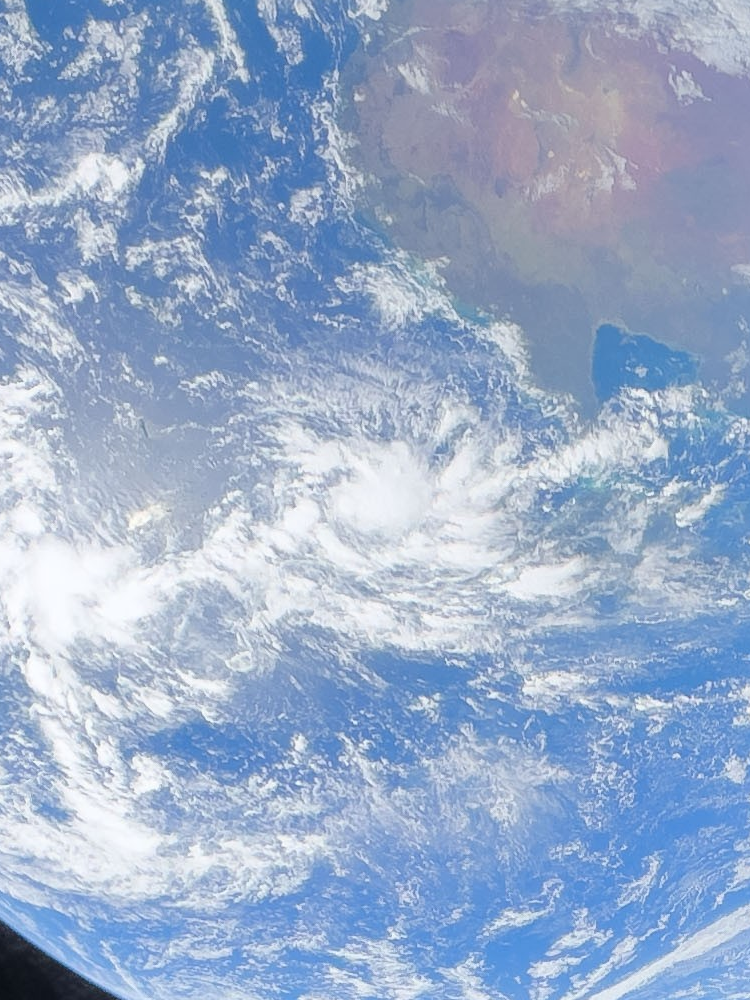
This cropped photo taken on 2 April by NASA astronaut Reid Wiseman of the Earth through a window captures Cyclone Maila (center) shortly after becoming a tropical low, as well as the disturbance that would eventually become Cyclone Vaianu (far right), during the Artemis II mission.

Maila undergoing rapid intensification over the Solomon Sea on 7 April

== Preparations and impact ==
=== Solomon Islands ===
Solomon Islands were battered with heavy winds and rains. The seas around the nation was also agitated. The Western Province and Choiseul Province were significantly affected by tidal floods from Maila. Three people went missing in Choiseul and four went missing in the Western Province. The three from Choiseul were later found in Isabel Province.

After the storm, the National Disaster Council began distributing supplies, including medicine, food, water and shelter, across the nation. Jeremiah Manele, the Prime Minister of Solomon Islands, issued SI$10 million in relief assistance. Solomon Islands requested Papua New Guinea to send police to aid with the emergency response. To replace damaged classrooms, a request was made to UNICEF to provide 28 tents to use in schools in the Western Province.

=== Papua New Guinea ===
The Tropical Cyclone Warning Center in Port Moresby, Papua New Guinea, issued tropical cyclone warnings and heavy rain warnings across the southeastern portion of the country. Gale warnings were also issued for several provinces in the nation. Classes were suspended in Bougainville due to inclement weather.

Papua New Guinea recorded 26 deaths from the cyclone, including 12 from a landslide in East New Britain, 11 in the Autonomous Region of Bougainville and three in Milne Bay. Eight people on a dinghy from Woodlark Island who made medical evacuations to Milne Bay went missing. The dinghy's crew was later found sheltering on Egom Island, waiting for clear weather. Flights to Tokua Airport were cancelled due to a flooded runway. Roads in New Britain were heavily damaged by Maila. A landslide struck the village of Lamarain in the Baining Mountains of East New Britain, killing 12 people. Power outages were also reported on New Britain. Water service failed in Rabaul and Kokopo. In most affected areas, communications service was inconsistent after the storm.

Two women, one in Buka and the other in South Bougainville, were reported deceased and a six-year-old in Buin was injured due to fallen trees in Bougainville associated with Maila's passage. Eight more died in a landslide in Central Bougainville, with more being hospitalized by the event. After the storm, the National Broadcasting Corporation of Papua New Guinea claimed that 20,000 people needed urgent aid in the region. A statement from Bougainville President Ishmael Toroama was released noting that heavy rain and winds from the storm had significantly affected communities across Bougainville, causing damage to homes, businesses and emergency services. The food supply chain was disrupted in the region. A bridge crossing the Ramazon River was destroyed. A car was washed away in South Bougainville.

== Responses ==
Australia has offered A$2.5 million in aid to support the clean-up effort in the nation, with foreign minister Penny Wong announcing A$1 million for impacts in Bougainville and Milne Bay. A provincial relief team for Milne Bay was organized in the aftermath. HMPNGS Rochus Lokinap, HMPNGS Francis Agwi, HMPNGS Agiwau, and HMPNGS Lokinap were dispatched to Alotau with relief supplies. The Papua New Guinea Red Cross Society began prioritizing access in hard-to-access, heavily impacted areas such as Bougainville and Milne Bay, though noted that access could take two to three days.

By late April 2026, New Zealand delivered a NZ$3 million aid support package to Solomon Islands and Papua New Guinea. In addition, New Zealand Defence Force personnel and aircraft distributed humanitarian relief supplies, tools, medical equipment and power generators to cyclone-affected communities in both countries. A Royal New Zealand Air Force P8-A Poseidon also conducted survey flights in cyclone-damage parts of Solomon Islands on behalf of the Solomons government. New Zealand Police personnel stationed in Bougainville Island also assisted local authorities with evacuating the wounded, purchasing emergency water supplies and transporting Red Cross members to isolated communities. The Ministry of Foreign Affairs and Trade also partnered with Papuan and New Zealand NGOs to provide disaster relief and early recovery efforts.

== Naming, records, and retirement ==
The name Maila was retired by the World Meteorological Organization. Tropical cyclones that form in TCWC Port Moresby's Area of Responsibility are assigned a certain name only once, as they are automatically removed after their usage. It was replaced by the name Paia.

Maila was the first tropical cyclone to be assigned a name from Port Moresby's name lists since Cyclone Guba in 2007. It was also the most powerful tropical cyclone in Port Moresby’s area of responsibility. Overall, Maila was the eighth name to be used (and retired) from Port Moresby's naming list after Manu, Agi, Aivu, Adel, Upia, Epi and Guba.

== See also ==
- Weather of 2026
- Tropical cyclones in 2026
