= Ruth Martin =

Ruth Martin may refer to:

== People ==
- Claire Rayner (1931–2010), English writer who used the pseudonym Ruth Martin
- Ruth Jefford (1914–2007), née Martin, American air taxi pilot

== Fictional characters ==
- Ruth Martin (All My Children), a character from the soap opera All My Children
- Ruth Martin (Lassie), a character from the American television program Lassie
- Ruth Martin (Neighbours), a character from the Australian television program Neighbours
- Ruth Martin, a character in the novel and movie Silence of the Lambs and TV series Clarice.

== See also ==
- Ruth (disambiguation)
- Martin (disambiguation)
