= Australian region tropical cyclone =

Type of cyclone in the Southern Hemisphere

An Australian region tropical cyclone is a non-frontal, low-pressure system that has developed within an environment of warm sea surface temperatures and little vertical wind shear aloft in either the eastern Southern Indian Ocean or the far western South Pacific Ocean. Within the Southern Hemisphere there are officially three areas where tropical cyclones develop on a regular basis: the South-West Indian Ocean between Africa and 90°E, the Australian region between 90°E and 160°E, and the South Pacific basin between 160°E and 120°W. The Australian region between 90°E and 160°E is officially monitored by the Australian Bureau of Meteorology, the Indonesian Meteorology, Climatology, and Geophysical Agency, and the Papua New Guinea National Weather Service, while others like the Fiji Meteorological Service and the United States National Oceanic and Atmospheric Administration also monitor the basin. Each tropical cyclone year within this basin starts on 1 July and runs throughout the year, encompassing the tropical cyclone season, which runs from 1 November and lasts until 30 April each season. Within the basin, most tropical cyclones have their origins within the South Pacific convergence zone or within the Northern Australian monsoon trough, both of which form an extensive area of cloudiness and are dominant features of the season. Within this region a tropical disturbance is classified as a tropical cyclone when it has 10-minute sustained wind speeds of at least 65 km/h (40 mph) that wrap halfway around the low level circulation centre, while a severe tropical cyclone is classified when the maximum 10-minute sustained wind speeds are greater than 120 km/h (75 mph).

== Basin history ==
There is a history of tropical cyclones affecting northeastern Australia for over 5000 years; however, Clement Lindley Wragge was the first person to monitor and name them.

In the early history of tropical cyclones in the Australian region, the only evidence of a storm was based on ship reports and observations from land. Later, satellite imagery began in the basin in the 1959-60 season, although it was not continuous until 1970. In Western Australia in particular, the lack of population centers, shipping lanes, radars, and offshore stations meant that storms were tracked infrequently. After the onset of satellite imagery, the Dvorak technique was used to estimate storms' intensities and locations.

Each of three tropical cyclone warning centres (TCWCs) of the Bureau of Meteorology in Perth, Darwin and Brisbane used its own tropical cyclone naming list until the 2008–09 season, when the three TCWCs started to use the single Australian national naming list. From the 2020–21 season, the three TCWCs were unified into one single TCWC which still monitors all tropical cyclones that form within the Australian region, including any within the areas of responsibility of TCWC Jakarta or TCWC Port Moresby. Later in 2021, the Australian tropical cyclone warning centre was officially named as TCWC Melbourne.

== Background ==
The Australian region is currently defined as being between 90°E and 160°E, and is monitored by five different warning centres during the season, which runs from 1 November to 30 April.

=== Australian tropical cyclone outlook regions ===
As of 2025, The Bureau of Meteorology has discontinued tropical cyclone seasonal outlooks, as season modelling is no longer accurate as a result of climate change.

The Bureau of Meteorology defines four regions within the Australian region which are used when the bureau issues tropical cyclone seasonal outlooks every year. These four regions are named the Western region, the Northwestern sub-region, the Northern region and the Eastern region. The Australian region overall averages eleven tropical cyclones in a season, and the bureau assesses the region as a whole to have a high level of accuracy when forecasting tropical cyclone activity.

The Western region encompasses the area east of 90°E and west of 125°E. The region covers the eastern Indian Ocean including the Cocos (Keeling) Islands and Christmas Island, and waters off Western Australia west of Kuri Bay. The region also covers waters off Indonesia that include the main islands of Java, Bali, Lombok, Sumbawa, Sumba, Flores and the western half of Timor. The region averages seven tropical cyclones in a season, and the bureau assesses the region to have a low level of accuracy when forecasting tropical cyclone activity.

The Northwestern sub-region encompasses the area east of 105°E, west of 130°E and north of 25°S. The sub-region covers waters off Western Australia north of Shark Bay, and extends westward to Christmas Island. The sub-region also covers waters off Indonesia as far west as Java and as far east as Timor. The sub-region averages five tropical cyclones in a season, and the bureau assesses the sub-region to have a moderate level of accuracy when forecasting tropical cyclone activity.

The Northern region encompasses the area east of 125°E and west of 142.5°E. The region covers the Timor Sea, the Banda Sea, the Arafura Sea and the Gulf of Carpentaria. The region averages three tropical cyclones in a season, and the bureau assesses the region to have a very low level of accuracy when forecasting tropical cyclone activity.

The Eastern region encompasses the area east of 142.5°E and west of 160°E. The region covers waters east of Torres Strait and includes the Coral Sea and the Tasman Sea. Lord Howe Island lies within the region, but Norfolk Island lies east of the region, although the bureau continues to monitor tropical cyclones when they are a threat to the external territory. The region also covers waters off Papua New Guinea and western parts of the Solomon Islands. The region averages four tropical cyclones in a season, and the bureau assesses the region to have a low level of accuracy when forecasting tropical cyclone activity.

== Climatology ==
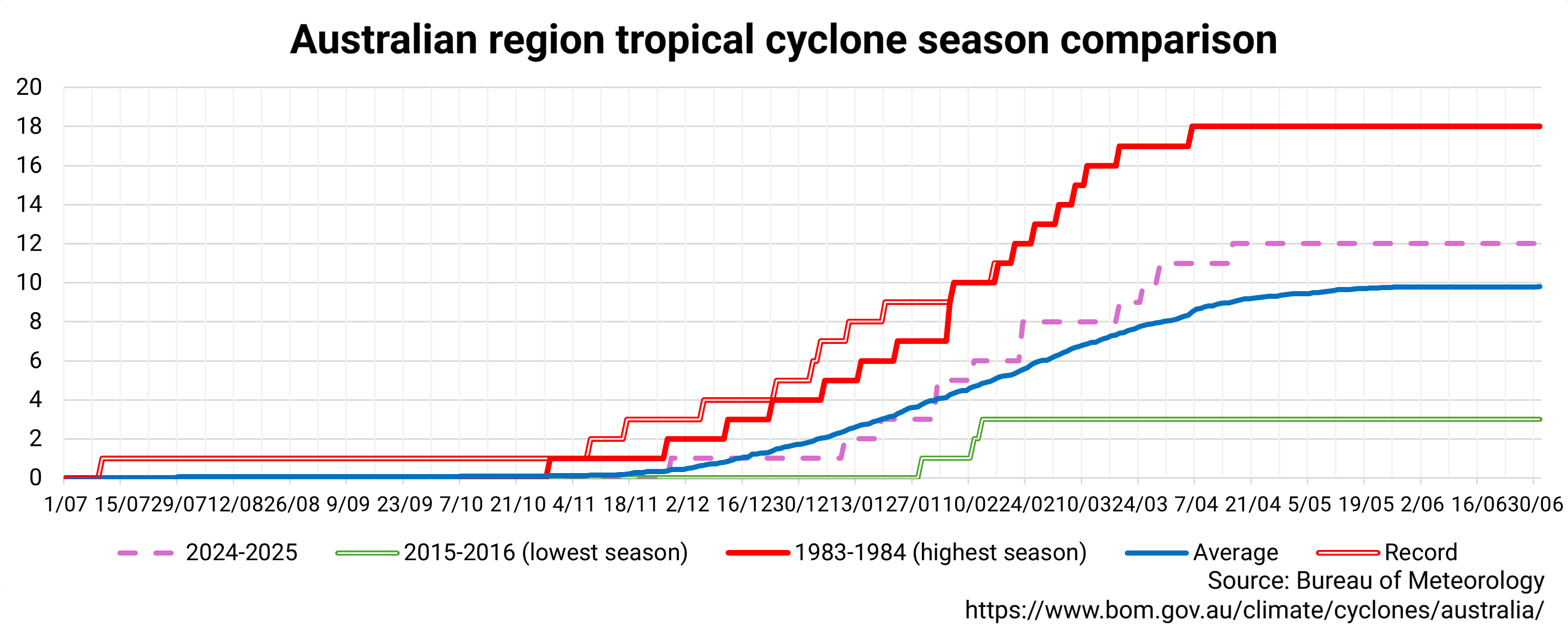

Tropical cyclones typically occur during the tropical cyclone season, though they can occur at any time in the year. The basin has an average of 10 tropical cyclones each season, with 3-4 landfalls. The amount of cyclones in the basin is heavily influenced by the El Niño and other climate drivers, with the Queensland coast recording 3-4 times as many cyclones during La Niña years as opposed to El Niño years. Activity in the region is also enhanced by a positive Indian Ocean dipole, and less active when it is in a negative phase.

Australian cyclone regions and their seasonal average.

The Australian region is subdivided into three smaller basins. The Eastern basin extends from 142.5-160°E, and averages three cyclones per season. The Central basin (Northern region) spans 125-142.5°E, averaging two cyclones each season, and the Western basin spans 90-125°E and records an average of six cyclones per season.

== Seasons ==
Historical storm formation by month between 1990 and 2020
- Category 5
- Category 4
- Category 3
- Category 2
- Category 1
- Tropical low

=== 1960–1969 ===
Season	TL	TC	STC	Strongest storm	Deaths	Damage	Retired names	Notes
1960–61								
1961–62								
1962–63								
1963–64							2 Audrey	
1964–65							3 Flora	
1965–66								
1966–67							4 Dinah	
1967–68								
1968–69	15	13	1	3 Amber				
1969–70	14	14	1	3 Ada	14	?	3 Ada	

=== 1970s ===
Season	TL	TC	STC	Strongest storm	Deaths	Damage	Retired names	Notes
1970–71	20	20	10	5 Sheila-Sophie	Unknown	?	1 Dora; 3 Fiona-Gertie	
1971–72	18	18	10	4 Emily	Unknown	?	4 Althea; 3 Daisy; 4 Emily	
1972–73	15	15	8	3 "Flores"	>1,574	?	4 Madge	Deadliest Australian Region cyclone season ever recorded. Features the "Flores" cyclone. The deadliest cyclone recorded in the Southern Hemisphere
1973–74	19	19	9	5 Pam	Unknown	?	2 Wanda	
1974–75	16	16	7	5 Trixie	>71	?	4 Tracy; 5 Trixie	
1975–76	16	15	8	5 Joan	Unknown	?	5 Joan; 3 David; 3 Beth	
1976–77	13	13	6	4 Ted	Unknown	?	4 Ted	
1977–78	9	5	2	5 Alby	Unknown	?	5 Alby	
1978–79	13	12	5	4 Hazel	Unknown	?		
1979–80	15	15	9	5 Amy	Unknown	?	4 Simon	

=== 1980s ===
Season	TL	TC	STC	Strongest storm	Deaths	Damage	Retired Names	Notes
1980–81	14	14	11	5 Mabel	Unknown	Unknown	3 Cliff	
1981–82	15	15	7	4 Bernie	Unknown	Unknown		
1982–83	7	7	5	5 Elinor	Unknown	Unknown	4 Jane; 5 Elinor	
1983–84	22	21	11	5 Kathy	1	$19 million	5 Kathy; 2 Lance	
1984–85	20	18	11	5 Kristy	0	$3.5 million	3 Nigel; 4 Sandy; 3 Margot	
1985–86	17	16	8	4 Victor	153	$250 million	3 Winifred; 3 Manu	
1986–87	9	7	2	4 Elsie	0	None	3 Connie; 2 Jason; 4 Elsie	
1987–88	6	5	2	4 Gwenda-Ezenina	1	$17.9 million	2 Agi; 2 Charlie; 1 Herbie	
1988–89	14	13	6	5 Orson	6	$93.9 million	3 Ilona; 2 Delilah; 4 Ned; 5 Aivu; 5 Orson	
1989–90	14	14	4	5 Alex	Unknown	Unknown	2 Pedro; 3 Felicity; 2 Tina; 4 Ivor	

=== 1990s ===
Season	TL	TC	STC	Strongest storm	Deaths	Damage	Retired names	Notes
1990–91	12	10	7	4 Marian	27		4 Joy; 2 Daphne; 2 Fifi	
1991–92	12	10	9	5 Graham	5	$9.4 million	2 Mark; 4 Ian	
1992–93	8	8	4	4 Oliver	0	$950 million	4 Nina; 2 Lena; 4 Oliver; 2 Roger; 3 Adel	
1993–94	14	12	7	5 Theodore	22		3 Naomi; 3 Pearl; 3 Quenton; 5 Theodore; 4 Sharon	
1994–95	19	6	6	5 Chloe	1		4 Annette; 4 Bobby; 3 Violet; 3 Warren; 5 Chloe; 4 Agnes	
1995–96	19	15	9	4 Olivia	1	$58.5 million	4 Frank; 3 Gertie; 4 Barry; 3 Celeste; 2 Ethel; 4 Kirsty; 4 Olivia	
1996–97	17	15	5	4 Pancho	34	$190 million	1 Lindsay; 3 Fergus; 3 Rachel; 3 Justin; 4 Rhonda	
1997–98	11	9	4	4 Tiffany			1 Sid; 4 Katrina	
1998–99	21	14	9	5 Gwenda	8	$250 million	5 Thelma; 3 Rona; 5 Vance; 4 Elaine; 5 Gwenda	Features Gwenda, tied with Inigo as most intense cyclone recorded in the basin.
1999-00	14	12	5	5 Paul	0	$251 million	5 John; 2 Steve; 3 Tessi; 5 Rosita	
Totals	147	111	65	Gwenda	98	≥$1.71 billion		

=== 2000s ===
Season	TL	TC	STC	Strongest storm	Deaths	Damage	Retired names	Notes
2000–01	14	8	3	5 Sam	2	$12.8 million	5 Sam; 3 Abigail	
2001–02	14	10	3	5 Chris	19	$929,000	1 Upia 5 Chris	
2002–03	11	9	3	5 Inigo	62	$28 million	5 Erica; 1 Graham; 5 Inigo; 1 Epi	Features Inigo, tied with Gwenda as most intense cyclone recorded in the basin.
2003–04	13	10	5	5 Fay	0	$20 million	4 Monty; 5 Fay	
2004–05	13	10	5	5 Ingrid	5	$14.4 million	3 Harvey; 5 Ingrid	
2005–06	18	12	8	5 Glenda	0	$5.1 million	3 Clare; 4 Larry; 5 Glenda; 5 Monica	Features Monica, most intense cyclone ever recorded in the basin in terms of sustained winds.
2006–07	8	5	3	5 George	3		5 George	
2007–08	14	10	3	4 Pancho	149	$86 million	3 Guba; 2 Helen; 2 Durga	
2008–09	24	10	3	5 Hamish	5	$103 million	1 Dominic; 5 Hamish	
2009–10	13	8	4	5 Laurence	3	$681 million	5 Laurence; 3 Magda	
Totals	137	93	41	Inigo	249	≥$1.75 billion		

=== 2010s ===
Season	TL	TC	STC	Strongest storm	Deaths	Damage	Retired names	Notes
2010–11	28	11	6	5 Yasi	3	$3.56 billion	1 Tasha; 3 Carlos	Featuring 5 Yasi the costliest storm in the basin. It is also the costliest season in Australian Basin.
2011–12	21	7	3	3 Lua	16	> $230 million	3 Heidi; 4 Jasmine; 3 Lua	
2012–13	16	9	6	4 Narelle	20	$2.5 billion	1 Oswald; 4 Rusty	
2013–14	17	10	5	5 Ita	22	$958 million	3 Christine; 5 Ita	
2014–15	18	9	7	5 Marcia	1	> $732 million	4 Lam; 5 Marcia; 3 Olwyn; 4 Quang	
2015–16	11	3	0	2 Stan	0	None	None	(Note: Number of tropical lows and tropical cyclones excludes Tropical Cyclone Raquel, which was considered to have been a part of the 2014-15 year.)
2016–17	30	9	3	5 Ernie	16	$1.8 billion	4 Debbie	Second costliest season on record.
2017–18	23	11	3	5 Marcus	41	$165 million	5 Marcus	
2018–19	25	11	5	5 Veronica	14	$1.63 billion	4 Trevor; 5 Veronica	
2019–20	19	9	3	4 Ferdinand	28	$4.3 million	3 Damien; 1 Harold; 1 Mangga	
Totals	207	89	38	Marcus	161	≥$12.6 billion		

=== 2020s ===
Season	TL	TC	STC	Strongest storm	Deaths	Damage	Retired names	Notes
2020–21	27	8	3	5 Niran	272	$701 million	3 Seroja	Second-deadliest Australian region cyclone season on record.
2021–22	32	10	2	4 Vernon	4	$80 million	2 Seth	
2022–23	25	7	5	5 Darian; 5 Ilsa	8	$225 million	4 Freddy; 3 Gabrielle; 5 Ilsa	
2023–24	11	8	6	5 Jasper	1	$790 million	5 Jasper; 3 Kirrily; 4 Megan	Features Jasper, the wettest tropical cyclone in Australia's history.
2024–25	24	12	8	5 Zelia	52	>$1.913 billion	5 Zelia; 4 Alfred	First above-average season in the Australian region since 2005–06.
2025–26	24	11	7	5 Maila	26+	$610 million	4 Fina 5 Narelle 5 Maila	The most active start to the season in the Australian region since 1983–84. Includes the first storm in 19 years to be named by TCWC Port Moresby since Guba in 2007 and also the most powerful tropical cyclone in TCWC Port Moresby‘s area of responsibility, Maila. Driven by a record-breaking negative Indian Ocean Dipole (IOD), which hit a weekly low of -1.94°C in November.
Totals	119	44	24	Darian and Ilsa	338	$3.769 billion	11 names	

== See also ==
- Tropical cyclone
- Atlantic hurricane
- Pacific hurricane
- Typhoon
- North Indian Ocean tropical cyclone
- South-West Indian Ocean tropical cyclone
- South Pacific tropical cyclone
- South Atlantic tropical cyclone
- Mediterranean tropical-like cyclone
- Australian monsoon
