= Cyclone Guba =

Category 3 Australian region cyclone in 2007

Severe Tropical Cyclone Guba
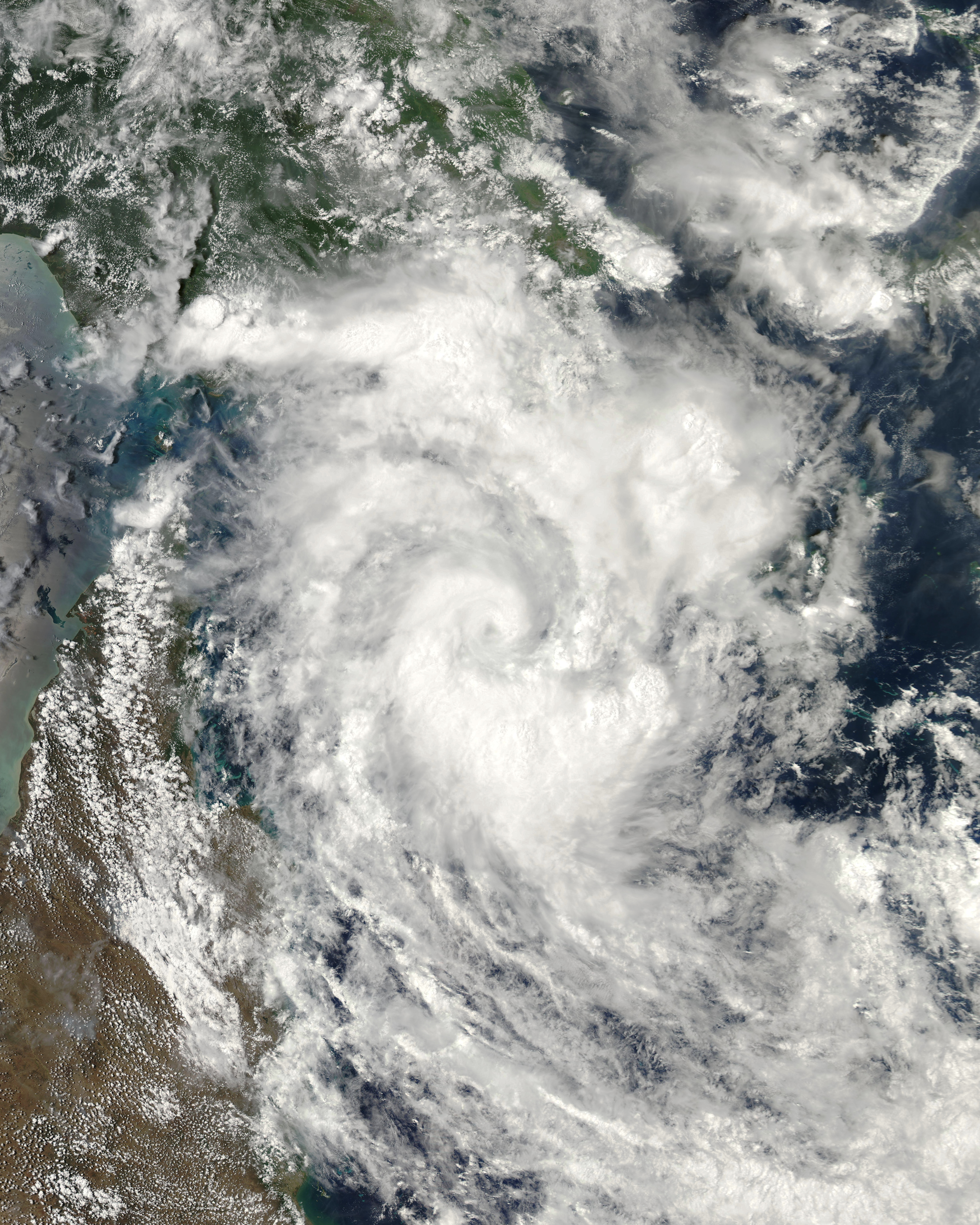
- Cyclone Guba near Papua New Guinea on 16 November

Meteorological history
- Formed: 12 November 2007
- Dissipated: 20 November 2007

Category 3 severe tropical cyclone
- 10-minute sustained (Aus)
- Highest winds: 120 km/h (75 mph)
- Lowest pressure: 971 hPa (mbar); 28.67 inHg

Category 1-equivalent tropical cyclone
- 1-minute sustained (SSHWS/JTWC)
- Highest winds: 140 km/h (85 mph)
- Lowest pressure: 967 hPa (mbar); 28.56 inHg

Overall effects
- Fatalities: 149 total
- Damage: $71.4 million (2007 USD)
- Areas affected: Papua New Guinea
- IBTrACS /
- Part of the 2007–08 Australian region cyclone season

Severe Tropical Cyclone Guba was a rare, yet deadly, tropical cyclone that formed in TCWC Port Moresby's Area of Responsibility, being the first storm to do so since Cyclone Epi in 2003, and remained the most recent to do so until Cyclone Maila in 2026. The storm resulted in 149 fatalities and severe damage across southeastern Papua New Guinea in November 2007. The first-named cyclone of the 2007–08 Australian region cyclone season, Guba formed on 13 November 2007 close to the island of New Guinea, and reached tropical cyclone intensity the next day by the Tropical Cyclone Warning Centre (TCWC) in Brisbane, with the TCWC in Port Moresby assigning the name Guba. It meandered in the northern Coral Sea for the next week, strengthening to a Category 3 severe tropical cyclone on 16 November. It posed a threat to the Australian Cape York Peninsula, but remained offshore, and finally dissipated on 20 November.

== Meteorological history ==
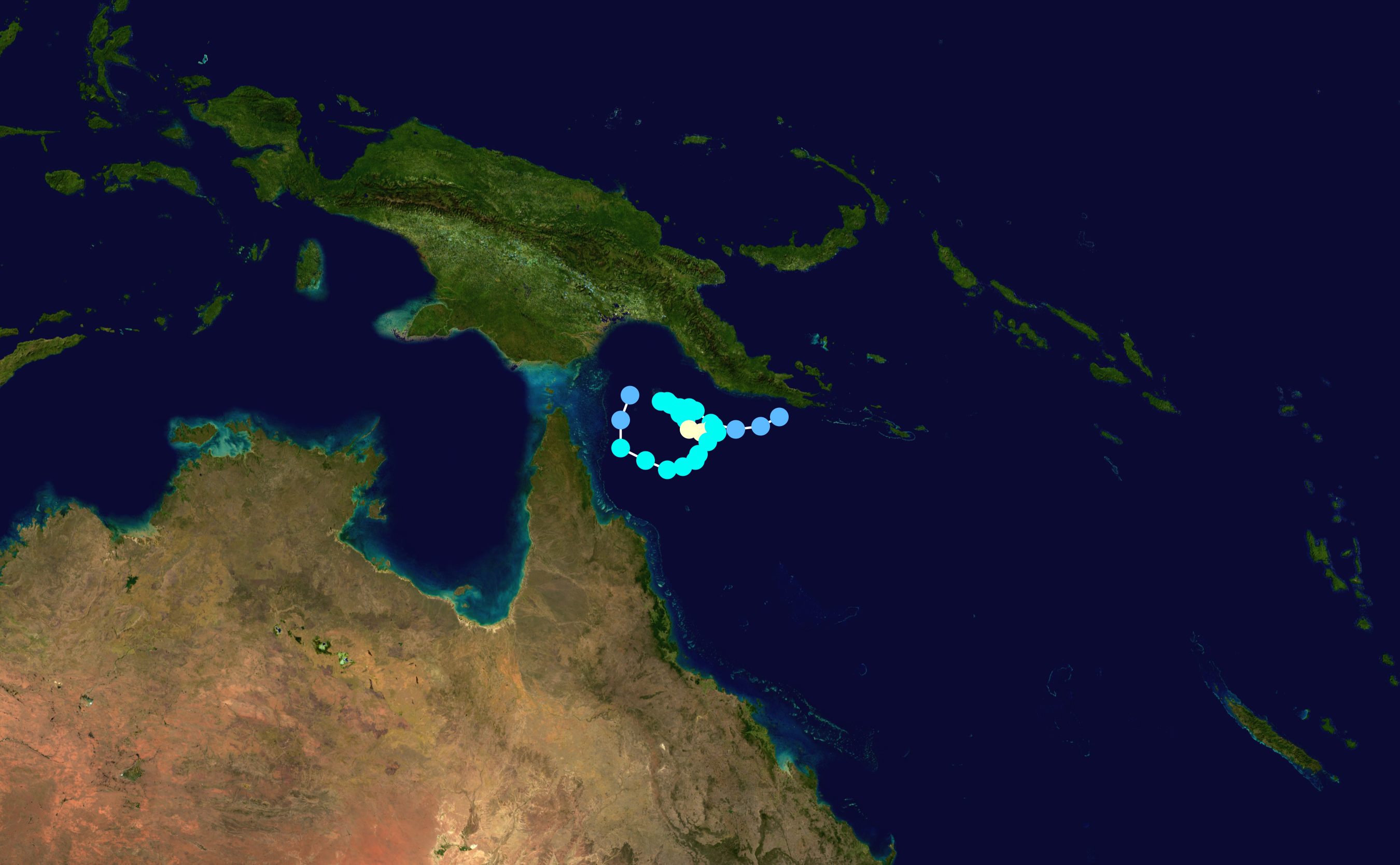
Map plotting the storm's track and intensity, according to the Saffir–Simpson scale Map key Saffir–Simpson scale Tropical depression (≤38 mph, ≤62 km/h) Tropical storm (39–73 mph, 63–118 km/h) Category 1 (74–95 mph, 119–153 km/h) Category 2 (96–110 mph, 154–177 km/h) Category 3 (111–129 mph, 178–208 km/h) Category 4 (130–156 mph, 209–251 km/h) Category 5 (≥157 mph, ≥252 km/h) Unknown Storm type Tropical cyclone Subtropical cyclone Extratropical cyclone, remnant low, tropical disturbance, or monsoon depression

On 12 November, a weak tropical low developed within the Solomon Sea, near the Papua New Guinean island of New Britain. During that day, the system's low level circulation centre drifted south-westwards, within an area favourable for further development, with low vertical wind shear and a good outflow. However, the disturbance could not significantly develop further at this time, as it was interacting with New Guinea. The system subsequently either passed near or over the south-eastern tip of New Guinea and moved into the north-western Coral Sea, where it quickly developed further with the aid of a south-easterly wind surge. As a result, the United States Joint Typhoon Warning Center initiated advisories on the system and designated it as Tropical Cyclone 02P during 13 October.

TCWC Brisbane initiated tropical cyclone advices on the tropical low early on 14 November, with a cyclone watch declared for the northern coastal and island communities in the Cape York Peninsula. Shortly after, TCWC Brisbane upgraded the system to Tropical Cyclone Guba, a name assigned by the TCWC in Port Moresby. The name Guba is a masculine name in Papua New Guinea meaning 'a rain squall on the sea'. Guba drifted erratically off the Queensland coast for the next two days, and cyclone warnings were cancelled when TCWC Brisbane expected the cyclone to remain slow-moving. Guba began drifting southwards and intensified on 16 November, becoming a Category 3 severe tropical cyclone. Guba was a small, but intense system, forming a well-defined eye. Guba began weakening on 17 November and was downgraded to a Category 2. After downgraded to a Category 1 cyclone on 18 November, it started to accelerate to the west towards the Queensland coast. Cyclone watches and warnings were declared again on 19 November as the cyclone was expected to move closer to the coast and intensify. This did not materialise, however, as Guba then turned northwards later that day, avoiding the Australian mainland, then northeast while it continued to weaken. TCWC Brisbane downgraded Guba below tropical cyclone strength, and issued its last advisory early on 20 November.

== Impact ==
As a tropical low, the precursor to Guba brought torrential rains to portions of Papua New Guinea, leading to widespread landslides and flooding. The most severe damage took place in Oro Province where 149 people were confirmed to have been killed by the storm. Damage from the storm was believed to have exceeded 500 million kina (US$177 million).

Flooding in Papua New Guinea led to at least 200 deaths. About 2,000 people were evacuated in the Oro Province as a result of the flooding. Roads, bridges and 40 houses were washed away, as tides in the area reached two metres high. In the provincial capital, Popondetta, the water supply and electrical infrastructure was damaged, and road access was blocked. Papua New Guinea's national airline, Air Niugini, suspended flights to Popondetta's main airport. The Rabaraba district in Milne Bay Province was also hit by flooding, with 30 houses and food gardens washed away, and forcing the evacuation of about 100 people. The government in Papua New Guinea reported that an estimated 145,000 people were affected by the flooding in Oro Province. Six days of torrential rain led to a damage total of K200 million (US$71.4 million). The torrential rain was the worst seen in the region in 30 years, according to the local people.

== Aftermath ==
The Papua New Guinea government declared a state of emergency in Oro Province and gave K50 million to help the province's communities. The Papua New Guinea Defence Force and local United Nations officials will assist in the relief, rehabilitation and reconstruction efforts. Australia donated A$1 million in humanitarian relief to the affected regions. Five Royal Australian Air Force aircraft, three Australian Army helicopters a Royal Australian Navy landing craft and other Australian Defence Force personnel were sent to Papua New Guinea to assist in the relief; along with supplies which include water purification tablets, water containers, emergency shelters, blankets and generators. The AusAID organised a mission to assess the damage to infrastructure and to report priority relief needs.

Four bridges were constructed at a cost of more than K139 million to replace the bridges washed out by the cyclone. The project was finished in 2016. Restoration on the bridges did not begin until after the 2012 election. The funding for restoration was provided by Australia. Canstruct was contracted to build the bridges.

== Naming, records, and retirement ==
The name Guba was retired by the World Meteorological Organization, and was replaced with the name Maila in List A and the name Auram was added to List B (backup list). Tropical cyclones that form in TCWC Port Moresby's Area of Responsibility are assigned a certain name only once, as they are automatically removed after their usage.

Guba was the first tropical cyclone to be assigned a name from Port Moresby's name lists since Cyclone Epi in 2003. It was also the first tropical cyclone to occur in the Queensland region in the month of November since 1977. No storm would be named by Port Moresby until Cyclone Maila in 2026. Overall, Guba was the seventh name to be used (and retired) from Port Moresby's naming list after Manu, Agi, Aivu, Adel, Upia and Epi.

== See also ==
- Timeline of the 2007–08 Australian region cyclone season
- Cyclone Maila - a similar, more intense system that formed in 2025
