= Ruth Lake =

Ruth Lake may refer to:

- Ruth Lake (Minnesota), a lake in Crow Wing County, United States
- Ruth Lake (Ontario), a lake in Nipissing Township, Canada

== See also ==
- Ruth Lake Provincial Park, British Columbia, Canada
- Ruth Reservoir, California, United States
