= List of storms named Trining =

The name Trining has been used to name nine tropical cyclones in the Philippine Area of Responsibility by the PAGASA and its predecessor, the Philippine Weather Bureau.

- Tropical Storm Rita (1963) (T6327, 42W, Trining) – was rated a typhoon by the JMA.
- Super Typhoon Carla (1967) (T6729, 36W, Trining) – a Category 5-equivalent typhoon, Carla caused significant rainfall in the Philippines and Taiwan, killing 250 with 30 missing.
- Tropical Storm Polly (1971) (T7120, 20W, Trining) – made landfall on the Korean Peninsula.
- Tropical Storm Roger (1979) (T7920, 23W, Trining)
- Tropical Depression Trining (1983) – affected the Philippines and Vietnam.
- Typhoon Phyllis (1987) (T8724, 24W, Trining) – sank a ferry boat carrying 50 people; 10 deaths and 13 missing.
- Typhoon Ruth (1991) (T9123, 25W, Trining) – a Category 5 super typhoon that weakened before landfall on Luzon.
- Tropical Storm Dan (1995) (T9524, 35W, Trining) – curved away from the Philippines.
- Tropical Storm Gloria (1999) (T9922, 30W, Trining) – remained out at sea.

After the 2000 Pacific typhoon season, the PAGASA revised their naming lists, and the name Trining was excluded.
