= Typhoon Ruth (1991) =

Pacific typhoon in 1991

Typhoon Ruth (Trining)
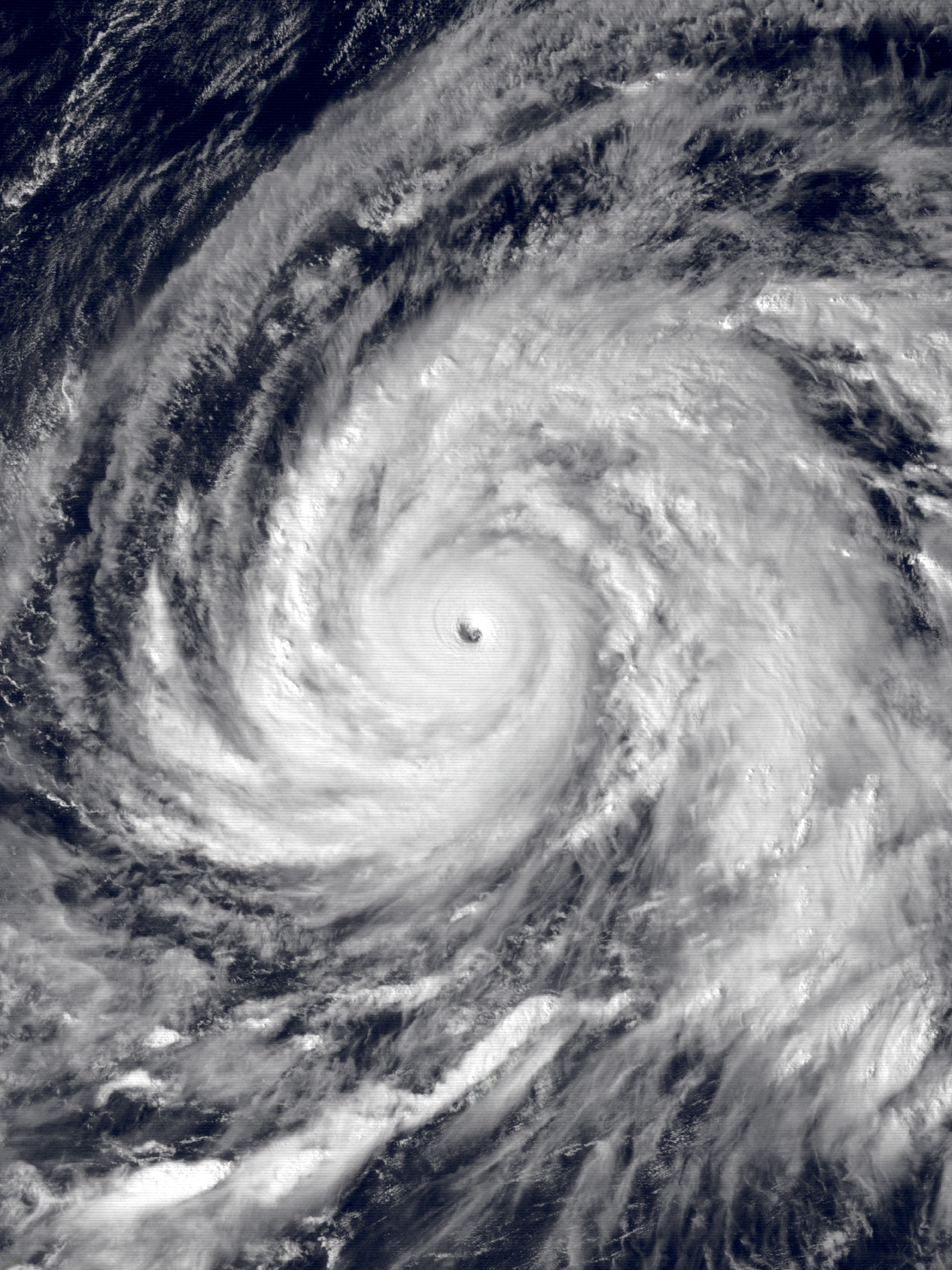
- Typhoon Ruth at its peak intensity on October 24

Meteorological history
- Formed: October 19, 1991
- Extratropical: October 31, 1991
- Dissipated: November 3, 1991

Violent typhoon
- 10-minute sustained (JMA)
- Highest winds: 215 km/h (130 mph)
- Lowest pressure: 895 hPa (mbar); 26.43 inHg

Category 5-equivalent super typhoon
- 1-minute sustained (SSHWS/JTWC)
- Highest winds: 270 km/h (165 mph)
- Lowest pressure: 892 hPa (mbar); 26.34 inHg

Overall effects
- Fatalities: 82
- Injuries: 55
- Missing: 22
- Damage: $151 million (1991 USD)
- Areas affected: Philippines; Taiwan; Ryukyu Islands
- IBTrACS
- Part of the 1991 Pacific typhoon season

Typhoon Ruth, known in the Philippines as Typhoon Trining, was an intense, destructive, and deadly typhoon which impacted the Philippines during October 1991. Originating from a tropical disturbance located between Chuuk and Pohnpei, Ruth developed into a depression on October 19, Steadily intensifying, after Ruth tracked west-northwestward across the Philippine Sea, it undergone rapid intensification, peaking as a violent typhoon with sustained winds of 215 km/h (130 mph) and a minimum pressure of 892 hPa (26.3 inHg) just a few days later. However, soon after, Ruth began weakening as it neared northern Luzon. Tracking northwestward then west-southwestward due to the interaction between a mid-tropospheric trough and the subtropical ridge, Ruth made landfall in northern Luzon with winds of 155 km/h (100 mph) before weakening into a tropical storm due to it interaction land. Ruth later recurved south of Taiwan, becoming an extratropical low on October 31. This low weakened as it interacted with a frontal low, dissipating several days later, on November 3.

Ruth prompted the evacuation of 13,600 residents living near Mount Pinatubo due to fears of mudslides, while authorities issued Public Storm Warning Signals, including the first instance of PSWS #4. Due to the typhoon, 82 people died, 55 were injured, and a further 22 went missing. Major cities like Baguio experienced heavy damage, with several fatalities occurring due to falling trees and mudslides. The capital, Manila, suffered extensive power outages which affected over 6 million residents, while heavy rainfall led to catastrophic flooding and landslides, notably on Kennon Road. The typhoon's remnants later contributed to adverse weather conditions in the Ryukyu Islands. Elsewhere, offshore Taiwan, a cargo ship sank, causing the loss of 18 crew members. In response to the disaster, President Corazon Aquino declared a state of calamity in affected regions and initiated relief efforts. Overall, the typhoon caused approximately USD$150.7 million in damages.

== Meteorological history ==
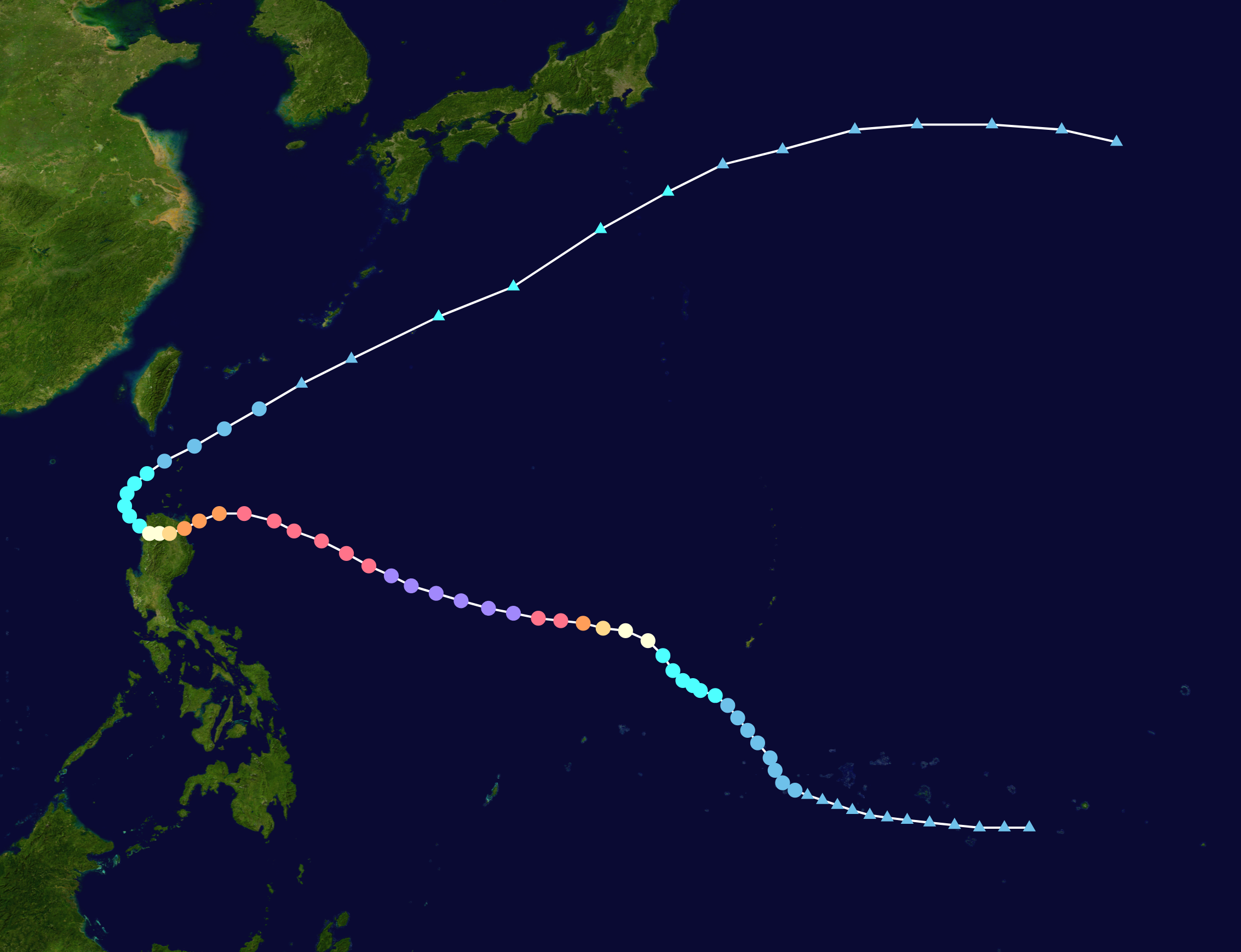
Map plotting the storm's track and intensity, according to the Saffir–Simpson scale Map key Saffir–Simpson scale Tropical depression (≤38 mph, ≤62 km/h) Tropical storm (39–73 mph, 63–118 km/h) Category 1 (74–95 mph, 119–153 km/h) Category 2 (96–110 mph, 154–177 km/h) Category 3 (111–129 mph, 178–208 km/h) Category 4 (130–156 mph, 209–251 km/h) Category 5 (≥157 mph, ≥252 km/h) Unknown Storm type Tropical cyclone Subtropical cyclone Extratropical cyclone, remnant low, tropical disturbance, or monsoon depression

The system that later became Typhoon Ruth originated from a tropical disturbance which was located between the islands of Chuuk State and Pohnpei on October. Steadily deepening throughout the next few days, convective activity associated with the disturbance began increasing as it moved west-northwestward, crossing the Caroline Islands. As a result, at 12:00 UTC on October 19, the Japan Meteorological Agency (JMA) designated this system as a tropical depression. Further development prompted the Joint Typhoon Warning Center (JTWC) to issue a Tropical Cyclone Formation Alert on the tropical depression on 01:00 UTC the next day, with a Dvorak intensity estimate of 45 km/h (30 mph) alongside increasing convective activity causing it to be designated as Tropical Depression 25W later that day.

Intensifying steadily as it moved northwestward between Guam and Ulithi, the depression was named Ruth on October 22 as it had produced 1-minute sustained winds of 65 km/h (40 mph). However, the JMA noted that the depression did not develop into a tropical storm for six more hours. Developing into a severe tropical storm at 06:00 UTC on October 22, as Ruth tracked westwards, later that day, satellite imagery indicated that an eye was forming, showing that it intensified into a typhoon. On October 23, the typhoon crossed into the Philippine Area of Responsibility (PAR), prompting the Philippine Atmospheric, Geophysical, and Astronomical Services Administration (PAGASA) to name it Trining.

As Ruth moved west-northwestwards across the Philippine Sea, the typhoon underwent rapid intensification, becoming a super typhoon around 30 hours after its eye first cleared, later peaking with 1-minute sustained winds of 270 km/h (165 mph) at 06:00 UTC on October 24. Around that time, the JMA designated Ruth as a violent typhoon, noting it peaked with 10-minute sustained winds of 215 km/h (130 mph). Steadily weakening soon after, as the typhoon neared northern Luzon, Ruth's eye weakened, expanding to have a diameter of 110 km (69 mi) as a result of this. On October 25, an eastward-moving mid-tropospheric trough interacted with the subtropical ridge, causing the latter to temporarily weaken, causing Ruth to recurve northwestward. However, after the ridge began restrengthening a few hours later, Ruth weakened back into a very strong typhoon and recurved west-southwestward.

Soon after, on 12:00 UTC on October 27, Ruth made landfall in northern Luzon with 1-minute sustained winds of 185 km/h (115 mph) and 10-minute sustained winds of 155 km/h (100 mph), making it the strongest typhoon to strike the region that year. A deeper mid-tropospheric trough picked up Ruth, making it recurve south of Taiwan. As this occurred, Ruth exited the PAR on October 30, causing PAGASA to stop tracking it. Significant weakening occurred as the Ruth tracked northeastward, causing both the JTWC and JMA to last monitor Ruth on 00:00 UTC the next day. Transitioning into an extratropical low soon after, the remnants of Ruth interacted with a frontal low prior to dissipating on November 3.

== Preparations and impact ==
=== Philippines ===
Due to concerns about potential mudslides, authorities evacuated 13,600 people who were living less than 10 km (6.2 mi) from Mount Pinatubo to safer areas. Philippine Airlines suspended domestic flights from October 27 to 28. Public Storm Warning Signals (PSWS) were issued throughout Luzon, with PSWS #3 being hoisted for Cagayan, Batanes, and Isabela. PAGASA tested its modified PSWS by issuing the first instance of PSWS #4 on October 27 due to the typhoon. In Baguio, a family of three were killed after their house was crushed by a falling tree. In total, 16 people died in the city due to either being trapped in their homes or being crushed by mudslides or fallen trees. Kennon Road was closed due to landslides caused by Ruth.

Elsewhere in Baguio, three people were injured due to falling trees, with heavy winds causing the city to lose power. A bus station and small hotel sank below ground level due to Ruth's heavy rainfall. Ruth's winds destroyed over 30% of the tobacco crop and many of the barns where the crop was processed. The PAGASA station in Basco recorded 616.4 millimetres (24.3 in) of rain, which made Ruth the wettest cyclone in the city until Typhoon Krathon produced 727.8 millimetres (28.7 in) of rainfall in Basco on October 1, 2024. In La Union, three people drowned. Elsewhere, in Abra and Ilocos Sur respectively, a person died when they were hit by flying debris. In Manila, a sailor died when he was smashed by huge waves into the wall of his tugboat. Many power lines were snapped due to Ruth, causing massive traffic jams and stalling factories for hours. These caused the city to temporarily lose power, affecting over 8 million people. The power supply in Manila was also interrupted while large areas of farmland were ruined by floods and landslides.

At least a hundred houses were destroyed throughout the Philippines, with many more having their roofs ripped off due to the typhoon's strong winds. The province of Isabela received a maximum rainfall of 120.6 mm (4.75 in) on October 27 due to Ruth. Heavy rain from Ruth triggered lahars on the southwestern flank of Pinutabo, with one travelling down the Marella River and another observed on the Santo Tomas River. Additionally, a debris dam in Mapanuepe Lake was swept away. More lahars were also seen in the Pasig-Potrero River, peaking at 3 m (9.8 ft) at 16:54 UTC on October 28. In total, 82 people died, 55 were injured, and 22 went missing. Later estimates by the National Disaster Coordinating Council revealed that, Ruth caused P3.072 billion (USD$120 million) in damage.

=== Elsewhere ===
The remnants of Ruth stimulated a stalling frontal low south of the Ryukyu Islands, primarily impacting the islands of Ishigaki and Miyako-jima. This system produced heavy rainfall, peaking in Ohara, which received 152 mm (6.0 in), and Hateruma, which received 122 mm (4.8 in). Flooding from the system damaged a forest road and ten farm roads, causing 18.44 million yen (USD$137 thousand) in damage.

On October 28, a spokesman for the Taiwanese government noted that the typhoon caused them to lose contact with the cargo ship Tung Leng and its crewmen of 21, south of Penghu. A later report by the Joint Typhoon Warning Center stated that the freighter sank near Taiwan, killing 18 of the crewmen. Elsewhere, the 14 Filipino and 4 Japanese sailors of the Southern Cross were saved after the freighter sank northeast of Taiwan due to heavy seas produced. Enhanced by the winter monsoon, Ruth caused NT$650 million (USD$24.25 million) in agricultural and fishery damage.

== Aftermath ==
President Corazon Aquino declared a state of calamity for portions of Luzon. This proclamation covered the provinces of Ilocos Norte, Ilocos Sur, La Union, Pangasinan, Cagayan, Isabela, Quirino, Benguet, Abra, Kalinga-Apayao, and the cities of Laoag, Baguio, and Dagupan. The government spent P180 million (USD$6.55 million) to repair Kennon Road, which was later closed due to landslides in May 1992. The Office of Foreign Disaster Assistance, headed by American ambassador Frank G. Wisner, donated USD$25,000 to the Department of Social Welfare and Development to be used for relief supplies.

== See also ==
- Typhoons in the Philippines
- Other storms named Ruth
- Other storms named Trining
- Typhoon Krathon (2024) – an equally violent typhoon that also severely affected northern Philippines
