= List of storms named Ruth =

The name Ruth has been used for 16 tropical cyclones worldwide, 15 in the Western Pacific Ocean and 1 in the Australian region of the South Pacific Ocean. The name has also been used for 1 European windstorm.

In the Western Pacific:

- Typhoon Ruth (1945) – struck Japan
- Typhoon Ruth (1951) – Category 4 typhoon, struck Japan killing 572 people and injuring another 2,644
- Typhoon Ruth (1955) – Category 5 super typhoon, churned in the open ocean
- Tropical Depression Ruth (1959) – far northeast of the Philippines
- Typhoon Ruth (1962) – Category 5-equivalent super typhoon, remained east of Japan
- Tropical Storm Ruth (1965) – remained out at sea
- Typhoon Ruth (1967) – Category 3-equivalent typhoon, remained east of Japan
- Tropical Storm Ruth (1970) (T7026, 28W, Aning)
- Typhoon Ruth (1973) (T7318, 20W, Narsing) – Category 2-equivalent typhoon, crossed Luzon, Philippines, then hit Hainan Island, China and then Northeast Vietnam
- Tropical Storm Ruth (1977) (T7702, 3W, Kuring)– hit China
- Typhoon Ruth (1980) – crossed Hainan Island before hitting northern Vietnam
- Tropical Storm Ruth (1983) (T8321, 22W, Ading) – dissipated east of the Philippines due to strong wind shear
- Tropical Storm Ruth (1987) – caused severe damage in South China
- Typhoon Ruth (1991) (T9123, 25W, Trining) – Category 5 super typhoon, made landfall on northern Luzon with winds of 115 mph (185 km/h)
- Tropical Storm Ruth (1994) (T9426, 30W) – short-lived storm, east of Japan

In the Australian region:

- Tropical Cyclone Ruth (1980) – remained east of Queensland

In Europe:

- Cyclone Ruth (2014) – impacted Wales, also known as Charlie
