= HMPNGS Francis Agwi =

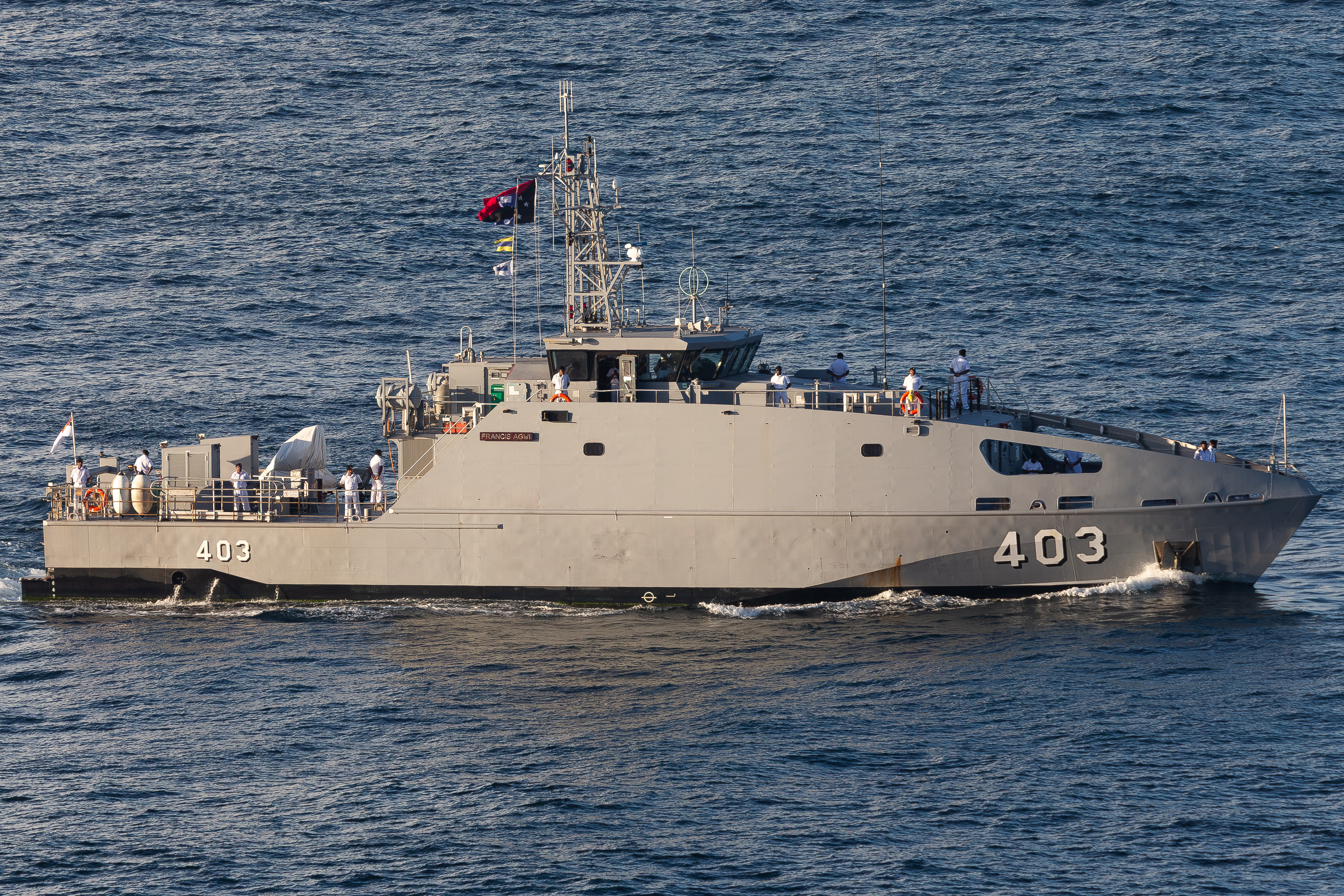
- HMPNGS Francis Agwi sailing into Sydney Harbour.

History

Papua New Guinea
- Name: Francis Agwi
- Namesake: Francis Agwi
- Builder: Austal
- Acquired: 22 October 2021
- Identification: IMO number: 4734221; MMSI number: 553111887
- Status: Active

General characteristics
- Class & type: Guardian-class patrol boat
- Length: 39.5 m (129 ft 7 in)
- Beam: 8 m (26 ft 3 in)
- Draft: 0.76 m (2.5 ft)
- Propulsion: 2 × Caterpillar 3516C diesel engines, 2 shafts
- Speed: 20 knots (37 km/h; 23 mph)
- Range: 3,000 nmi (5,600 km; 3,500 mi) at 12 knots (22 km/h; 14 mph)
- Armament: Australia provides the ships without armament, but they are designed to be able to mount heavy machine guns, or an autocannon of up to 30 mm on the foredeck

HMPNGS Francis Agwi (P403) a Guardian-class patrol boat of the Papua New Guinea Defence Force. She replaced HMPNGS Seeadler, a Pacific-class patrol boat, and was commissioned on the 22nd of October 2021. The vessel is named after Brigadier General Francis Agwi, the 9th commander of the Papua New Guinea Defence Force.

== Design ==
Francis Agwi is a Guardian-class patrol boat, a design based on previous vessels built for the Royal Australian Navy and Australian Border Force by Austal. HMPNGS Francis Agwi is 39.5 meters (129 ft 7 in) long overall, with a beam of 8 meters (26 ft 3 in) and a loaded draft of 2.5 meters (8 ft 2 in). Timo is powered by two Caterpillar 3516C diesel engines with two ZF7600 gearboxes turning two fixed pitch propellers creating 4,000 kW. Francis Agwi has a maximum speed of 20 knots (37 km/h; 23 mph) and a range of 3,000 nautical miles (5,600 km; 3,500 mi) at 12 knots (22 km/h; 14 mph).

== Operational Career ==
HMPNGS Francis Agwi was commissioned on the 22nd of October 2021, in a ceremony held at the Henderson shipyard. She was delivered to the Papua New Guinea Defence Force as part of the Pacific Maritime Security Program.

In March of 2026, HMPNGS Francis Agwi participated in the Exercise Kakadu Fleet Review in Sydney harbour.

== See Also ==
- Guardian-class patrol boat
