= Ruth Lake (Minnesota) =

Lake in the state of Minnesota, United States

- Location within Minnesota
- Location: Crow Wing County, Minnesota
- Coordinates: 46°44′57″N 93°57′12″W
- Type: lake

Ruth Lake is a lake in Crow Wing County, in the U.S. state of Minnesota.

According to Warren Upham, Ruth Lake was probably named of the daughter or wife of a pioneer lumberman.

== See also ==
- List of lakes in Minnesota
