= Château de Ruthie =

Castle in Pyrénées-Atlantiques, France

Coordinates: 43°09′01″N 0°55′57″W

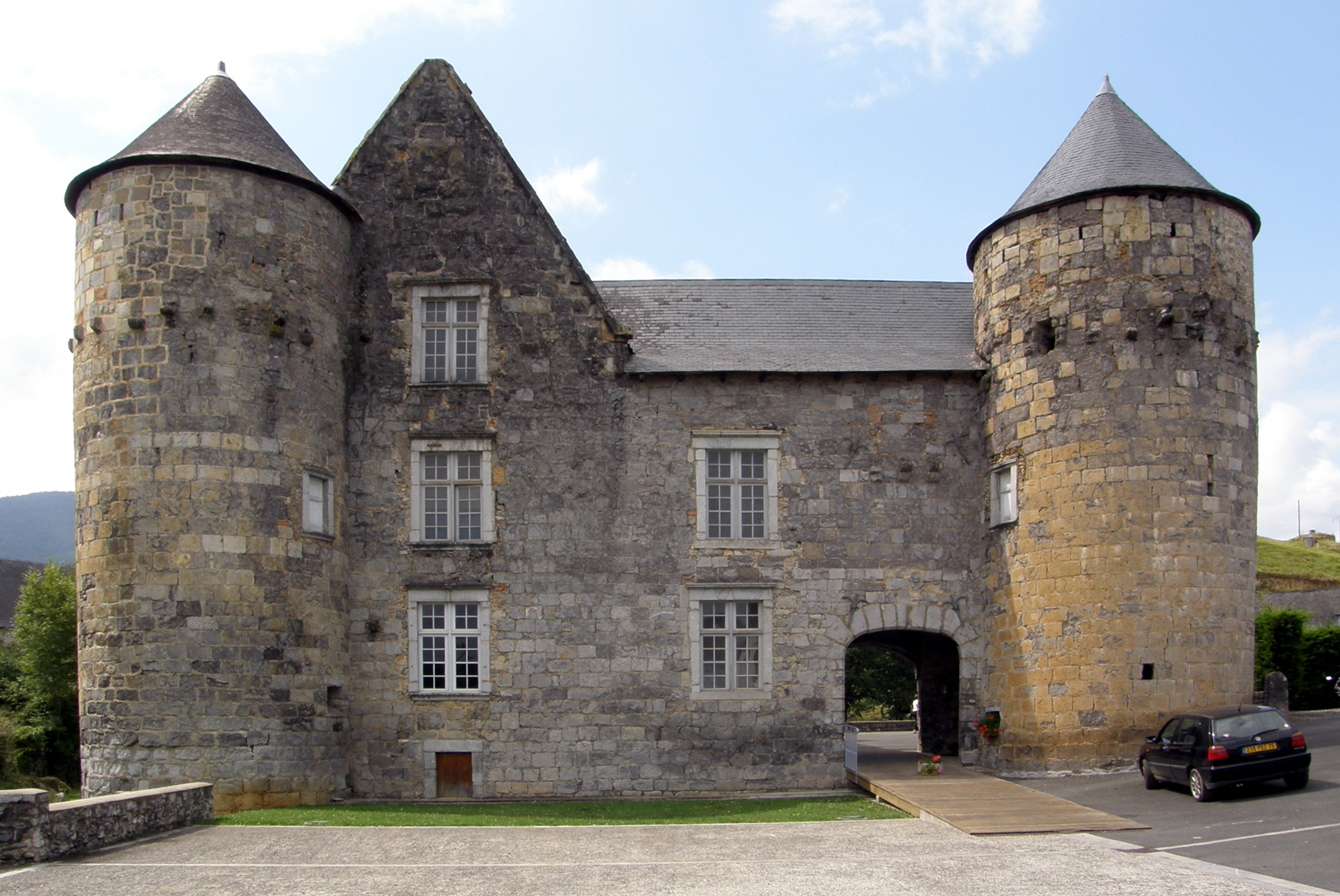
Château de Ruthie

The Château de Ruthie is a castle in the commune of Aussurucq in the Pyrénées-Atlantiques département of France.

Construction took place at various times in the 11th, 15th, 17th and 18th centuries. It was listed as a monument historique by the French Ministry of Culture on 30 April 1925, giving protection to its internal decoration. It is the property of the commune.

== See also ==
- List of castles in France
