= Ruth (Hayez) =

Painting by Francesco Hayez

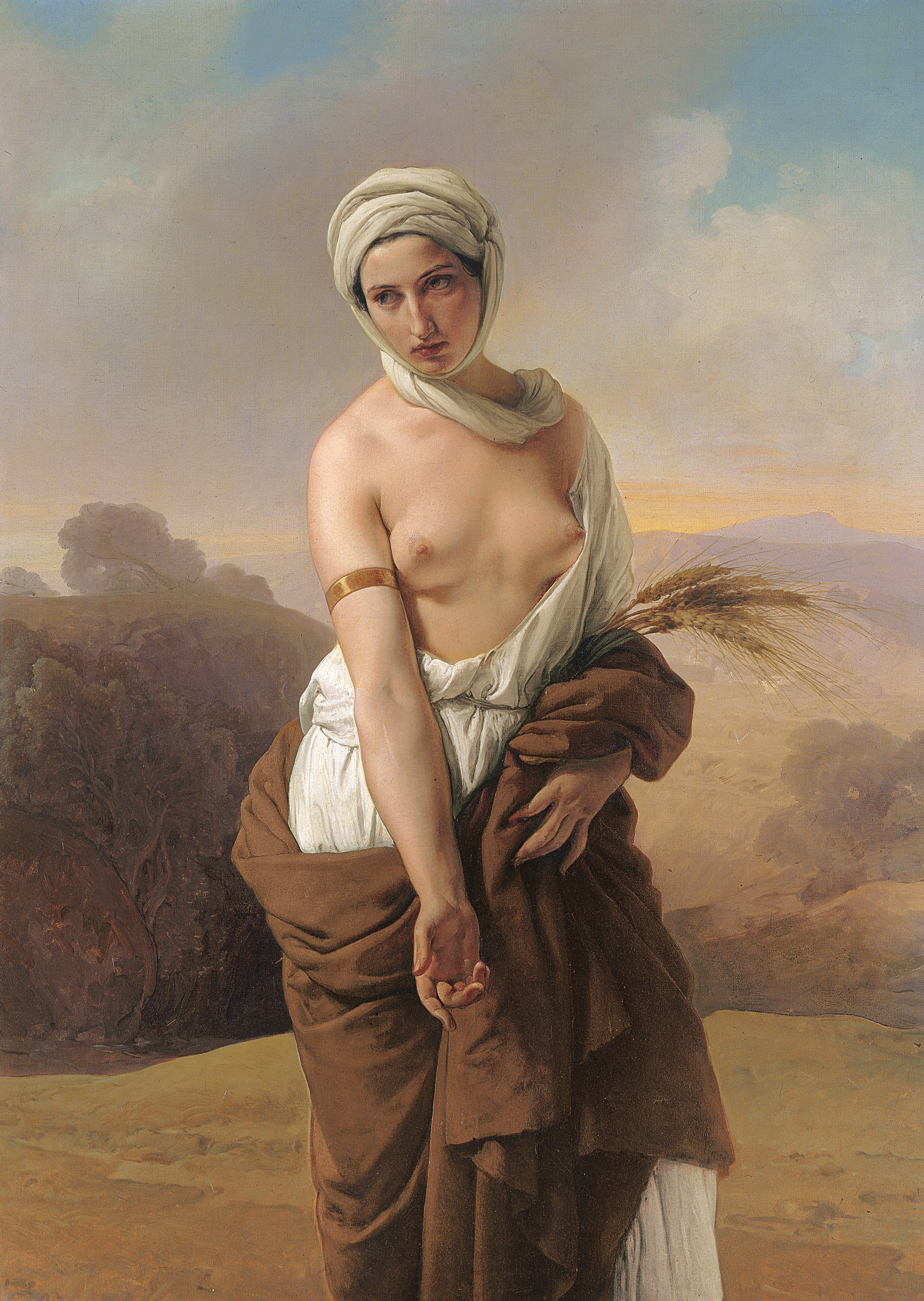
- Artist: Francesco Hayez
- Year: 1853
- Type: Oil on canvas, history painting
- Dimensions: 137 cm × 100 cm (54 in × 39 in)
- Location: Pinacoteca Nazionale di Bologna; Bologna

Ruth is an 1853 oil painting by the Italian artist Francesco Hayez. It depicts the biblical figure of Ruth, a Moab woman who married the Israelite Mahlon and was the great-grandmother of King David.

Hayez was a noted painter of the romantic style. Commissioned by Severino Bonora from Bologna, the painting is sometimes incorrectly dated to 1835. It is now in the collection of the Pinacoteca Nazionale di Bologna.

== Bibliography ==
- Bernini, Emma & Rota, Roberta. Il Settecento e l'Ottocento. Laterza, 2002.
- Pardes, Ilana. Ruth: A Migrant's Tale. Yale University Press, 2022.
