= 1992–93 Australian region cyclone season =

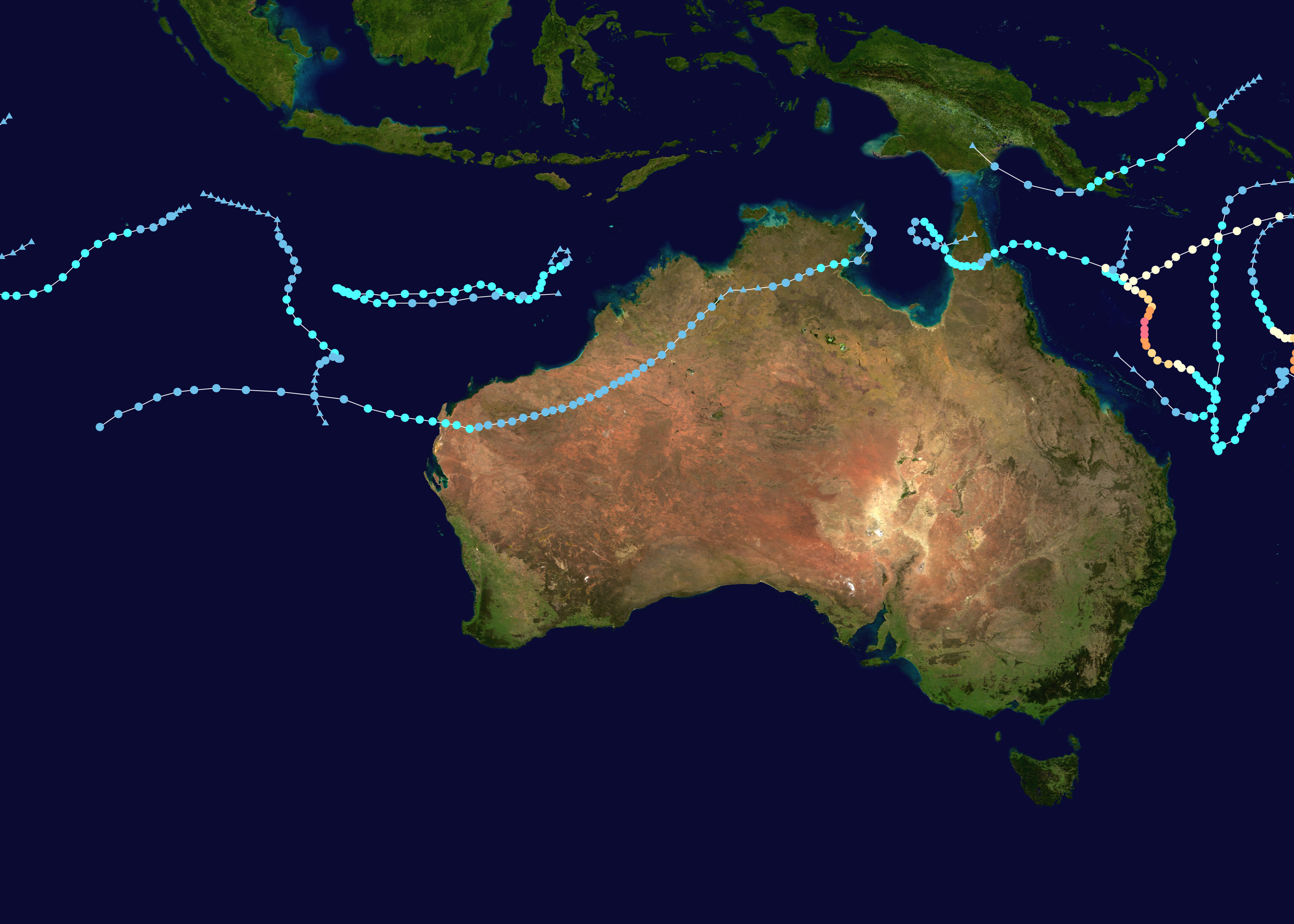
- Season summary map

Seasonal boundaries
- First system formed: 17 December 1992
- Last system dissipated: 16 May 1993

Strongest storm
- Name: Oliver
  - Maximum winds: 185 km/h (115 mph) (10-minute sustained)
  - Lowest pressure: 950 hPa (mbar)

Seasonal statistics
- Tropical lows: 8
- Tropical cyclones: 8
- Severe tropical cyclones: 4
- Total fatalities: 0
- Total damage: $950 million (1992 USD)

Related articles
- 1992–93 South-West Indian Ocean cyclone season; 1992–93 South Pacific cyclone season

The 1992–93 Australian region cyclone season was a below average Australian cyclone season. It was also an event in the ongoing cycle of tropical cyclone formation. It ran from 1 November 1992 to 30 April 1993. The regional tropical cyclone operational plan also defines a tropical cyclone year separately from a tropical cyclone season, and the "tropical cyclone year" ran from 1 July 1992 to 30 June 1993.

Tropical cyclones in this area were monitored by four Tropical Cyclone Warning Centres (TCWCs): the Australian Bureau of Meteorology in Perth, Darwin, and Brisbane; and TCWC Port Moresby in Papua New Guinea.

== Systems ==
=== Tropical Cyclone Ken ===
- Category 1 tropical cyclone (Australian scale)
- Tropical storm (SSHWS)
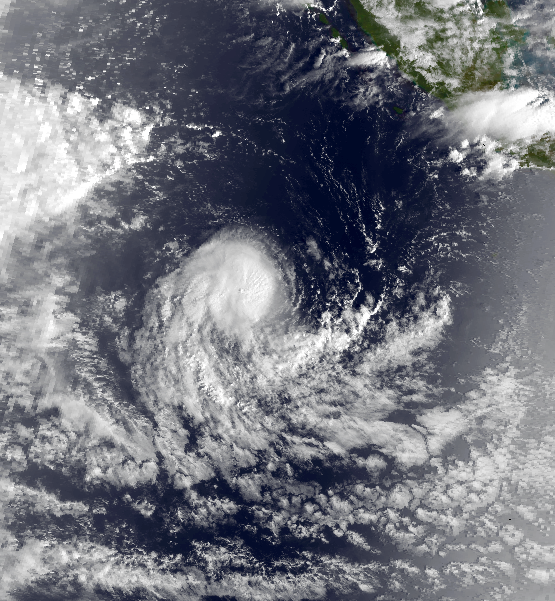
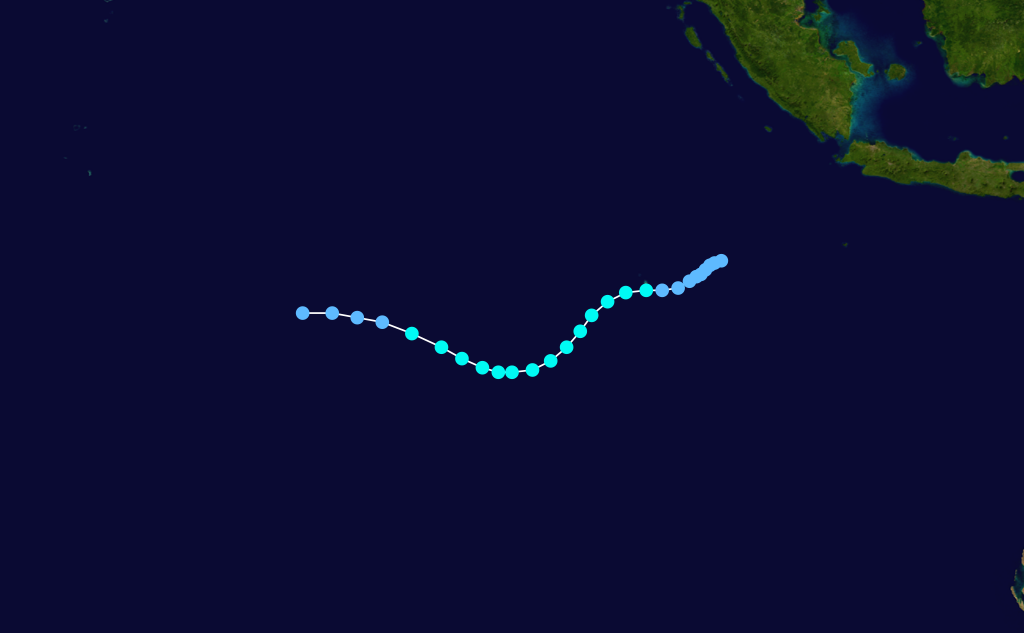
- Duration: 17 December – 23 December
- Peak intensity: 75 km/h (45 mph) (10-min); 990 hPa (mbar)

Tropical Cyclone Ken existed from 17 December to 23 December.

=== Severe Tropical Cyclone Nina ===
- Category 3 severe tropical cyclone (Australian scale)
- Category 1 tropical cyclone (SSHWS)
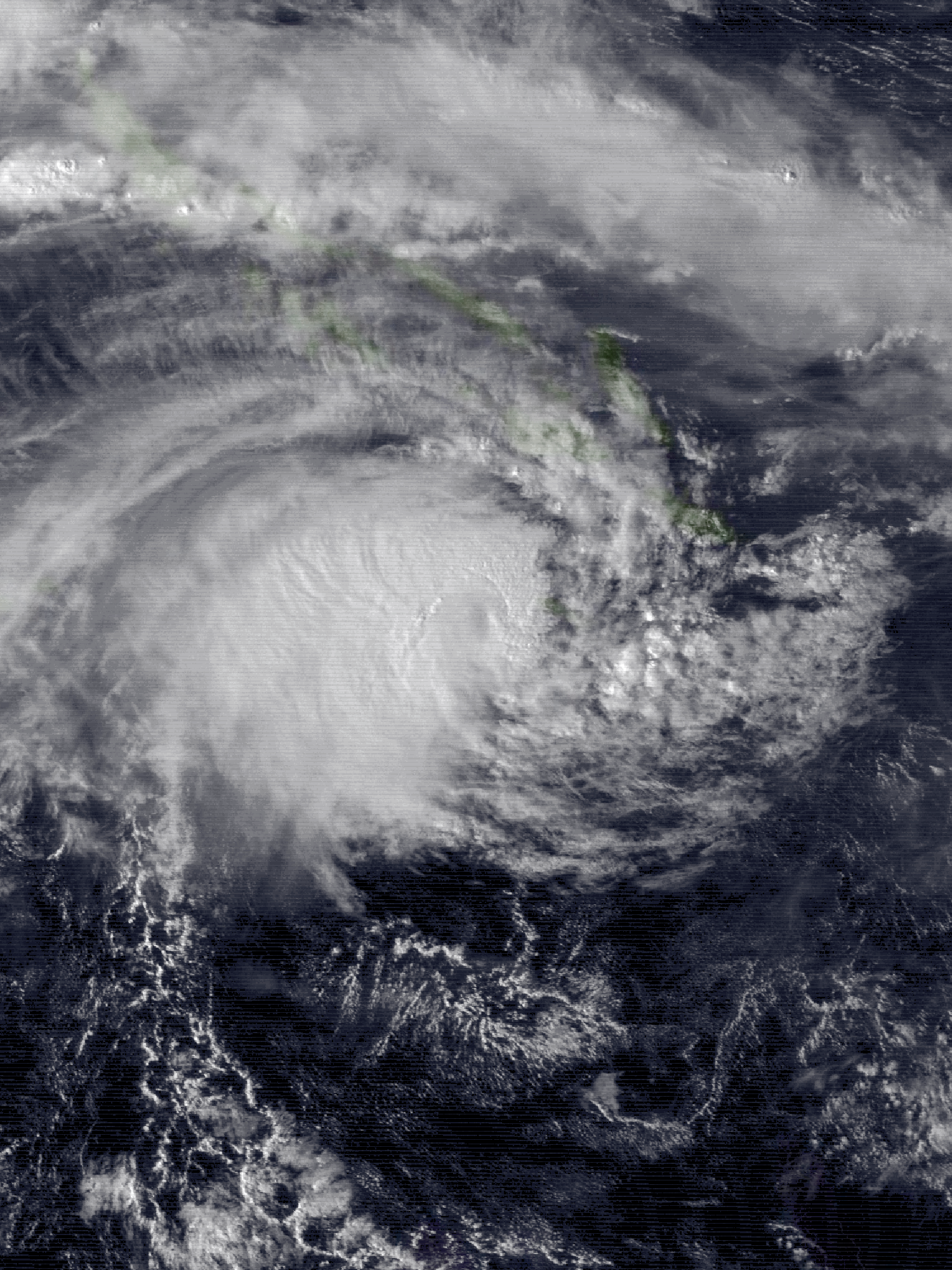
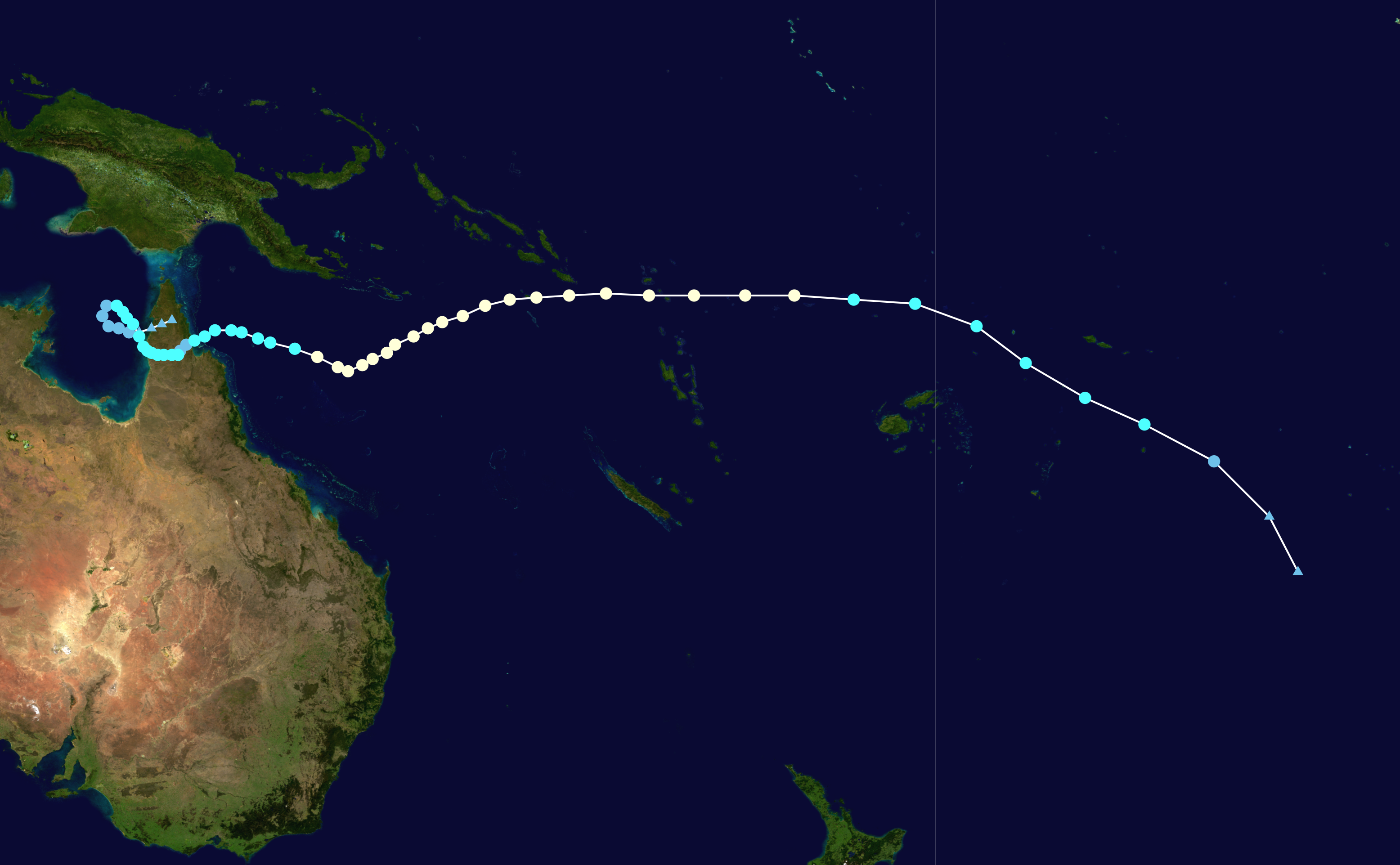
- Duration: 21 December – 1 January (Exited basin)
- Peak intensity: 155 km/h (100 mph) (10-min); 960 hPa (mbar)

Nina formed on December 21, 1992, the storm reached Category 1 status before making landfall in northern Queensland, then Nina moved eastward, reaching Category 3 status before becoming an extratropical cyclone on January 4, 1993.

=== Tropical Cyclone Lena ===
- Category 2 tropical cyclone (Australian scale)
- Tropical storm (SSHWS)
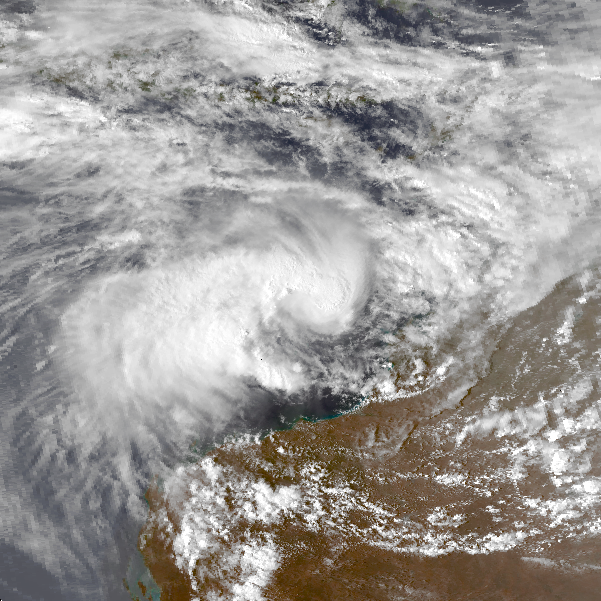
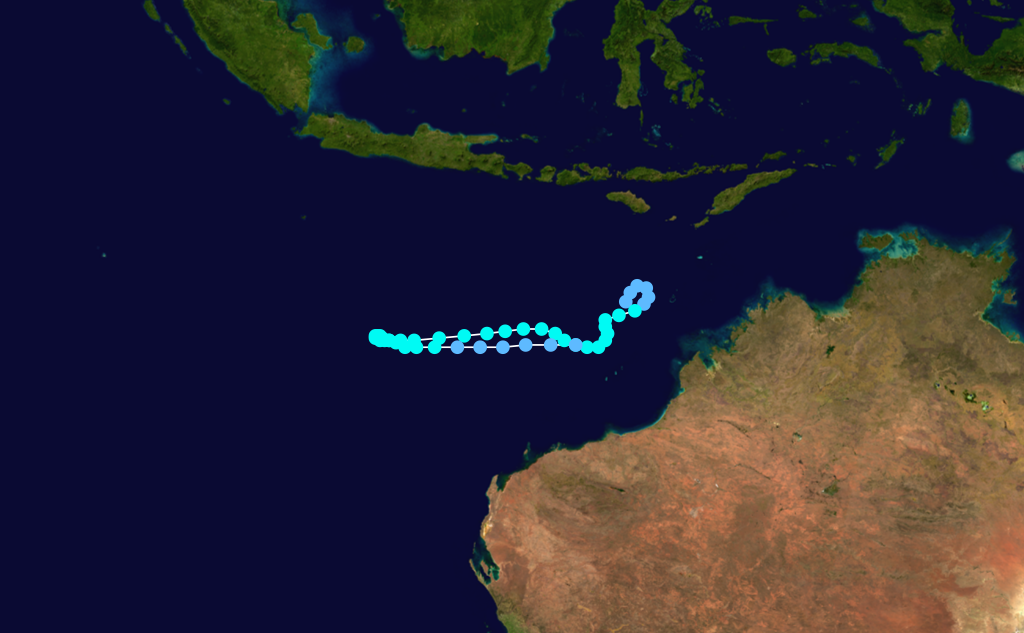
- Duration: 22 January – 2 February
- Peak intensity: 100 km/h (65 mph) (10-min); 972 hPa (mbar)

Tropical Cyclone Lena existed from 22 January to 2 February.

=== Severe Tropical Cyclone Oliver ===
- Category 4 severe tropical cyclone (Australian scale)
- Category 4 tropical cyclone (SSHWS)
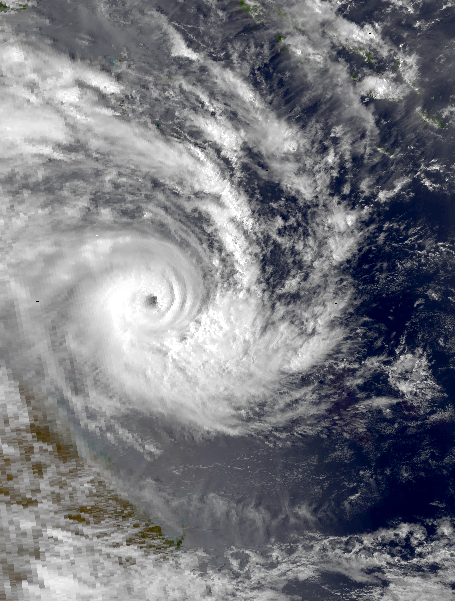
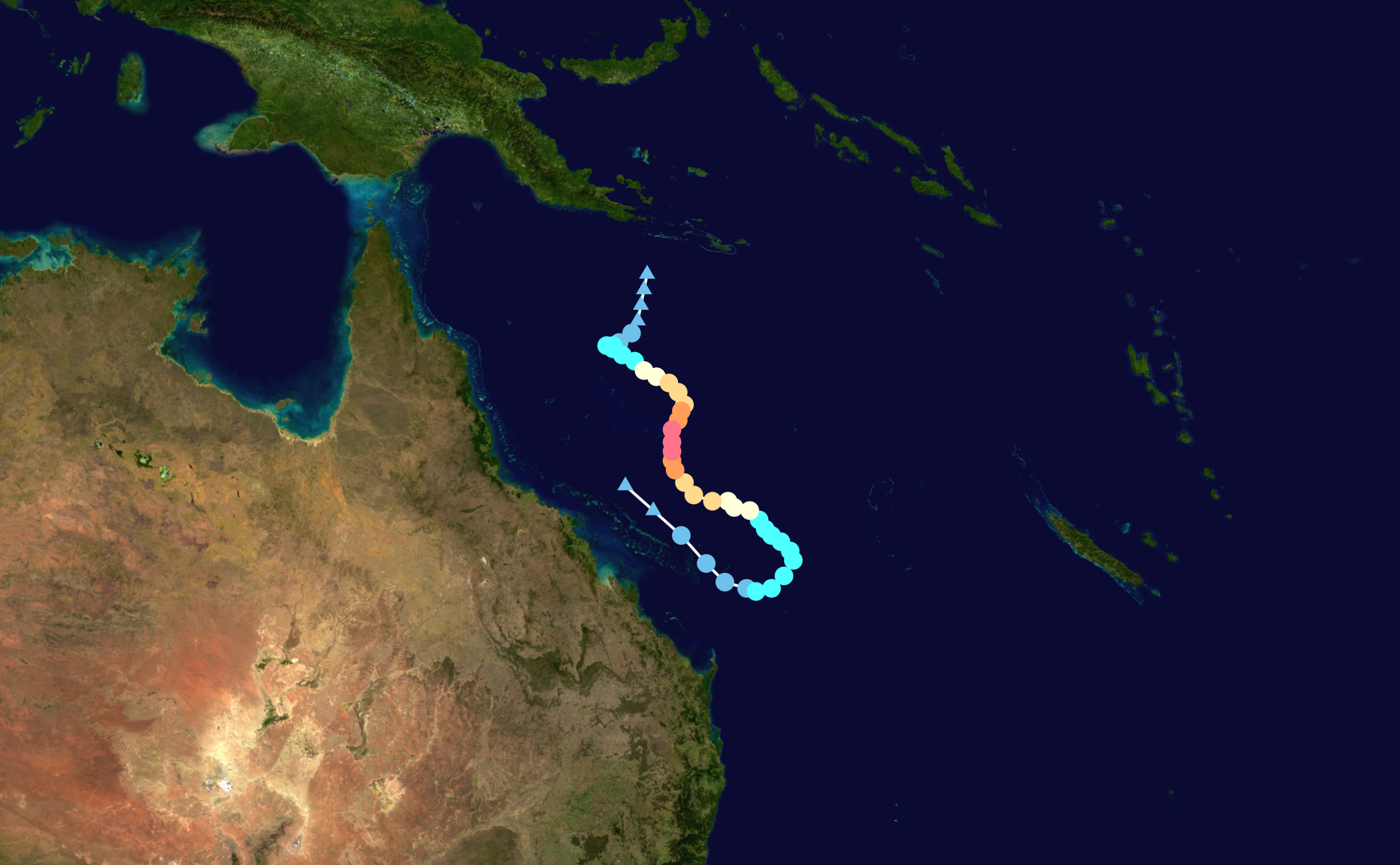
- Duration: 3 February – 14 February
- Peak intensity: 185 km/h (115 mph) (10-min); 950 hPa (mbar)

Severe Tropical Cyclone Oliver existed from 3 February to 14 February.

=== Severe Tropical Cyclone Polly ===
- Category 3 severe tropical cyclone (Australian scale)
- Category 3 tropical cyclone (SSHWS)
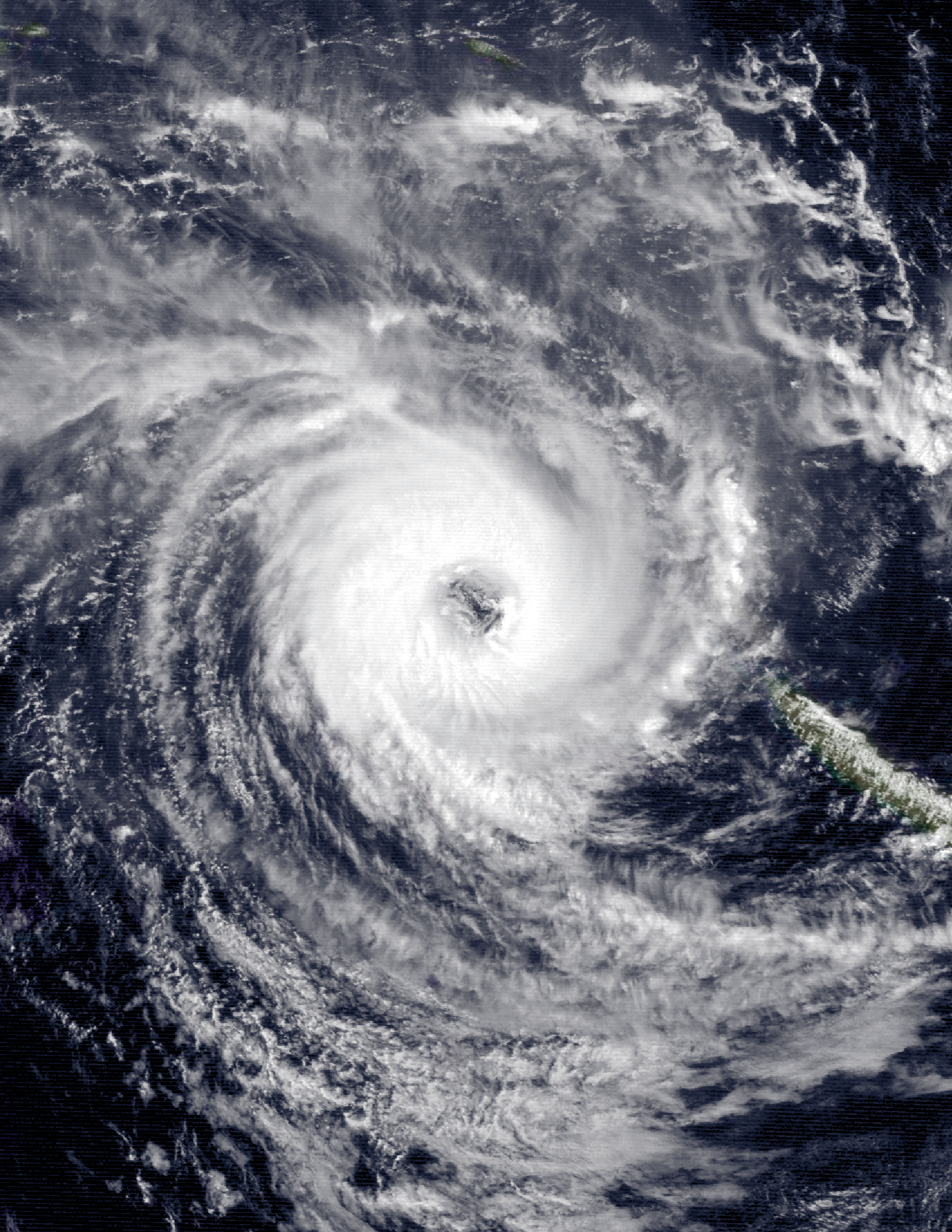
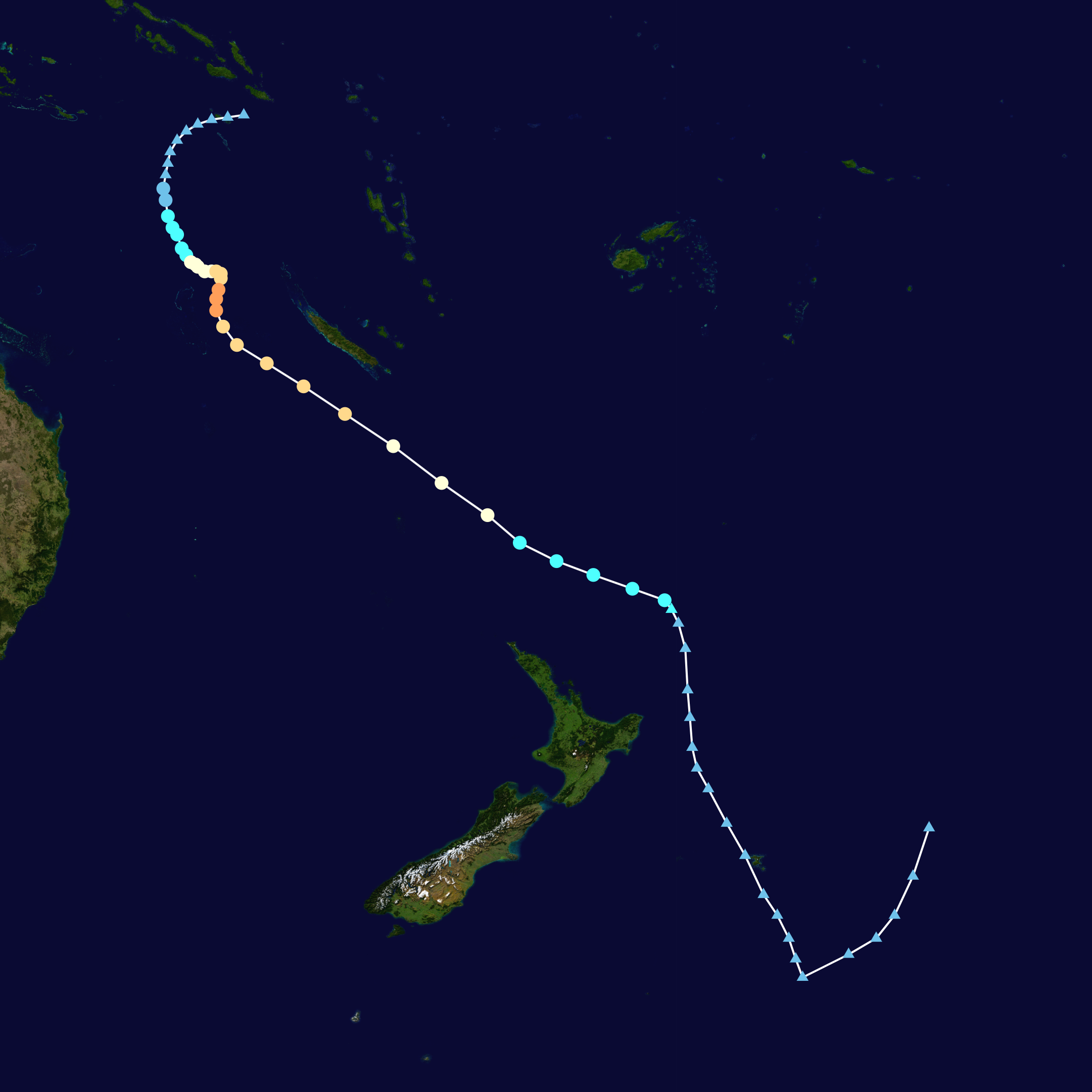
- Duration: 25 February – 27 February (Exited basin)
- Peak intensity: 155 km/h (100 mph) (10-min); 955 hPa (mbar)

Developed in the Coral Sea far offshore from Queensland. The cyclone intensified to a Category 3 severe tropical cyclone before crossing out of Australian region on 1 March where it passed to the southwest of New Caledonia.

=== Tropical Cyclone Roger ===
- Category 2 tropical cyclone (Australian scale)
- Tropical storm (SSHWS)
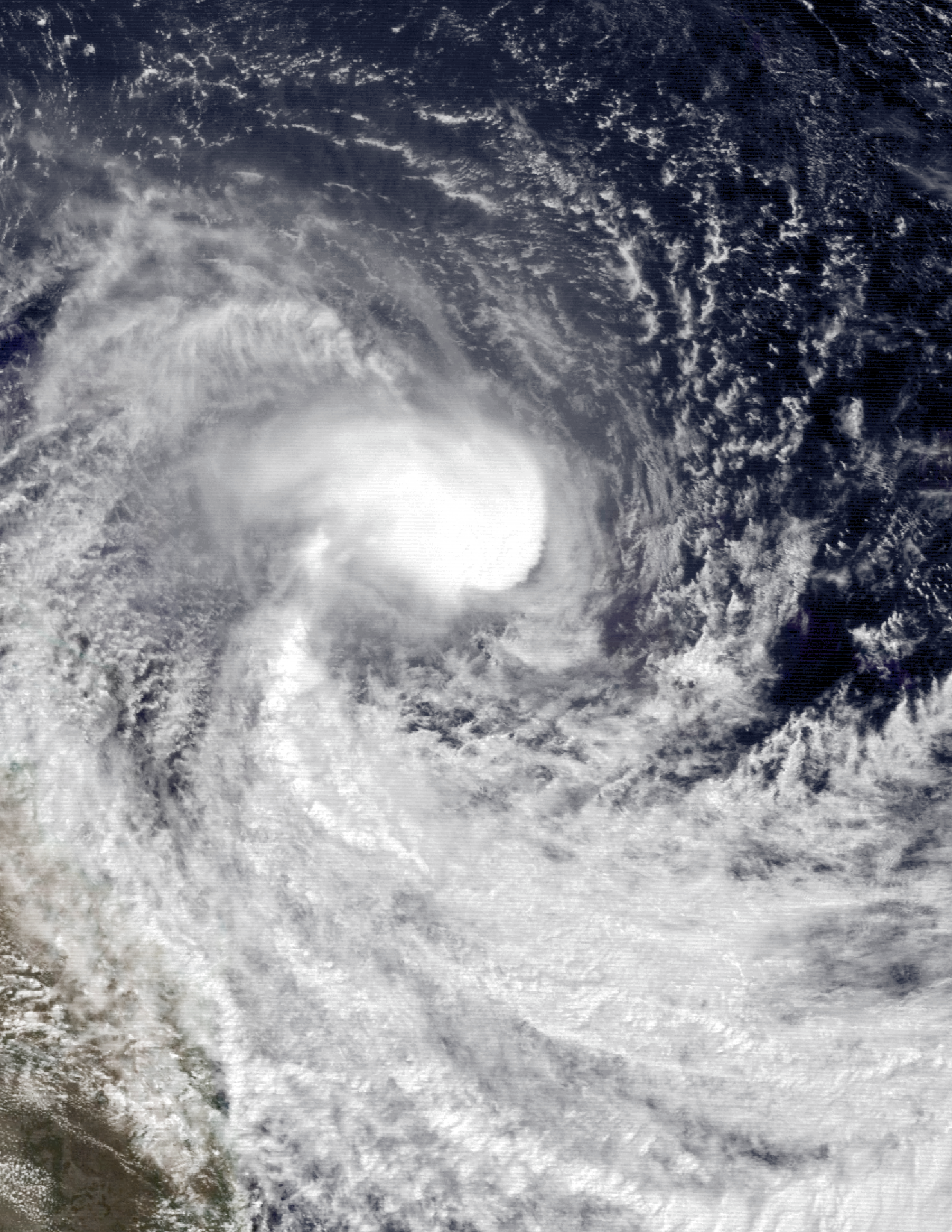
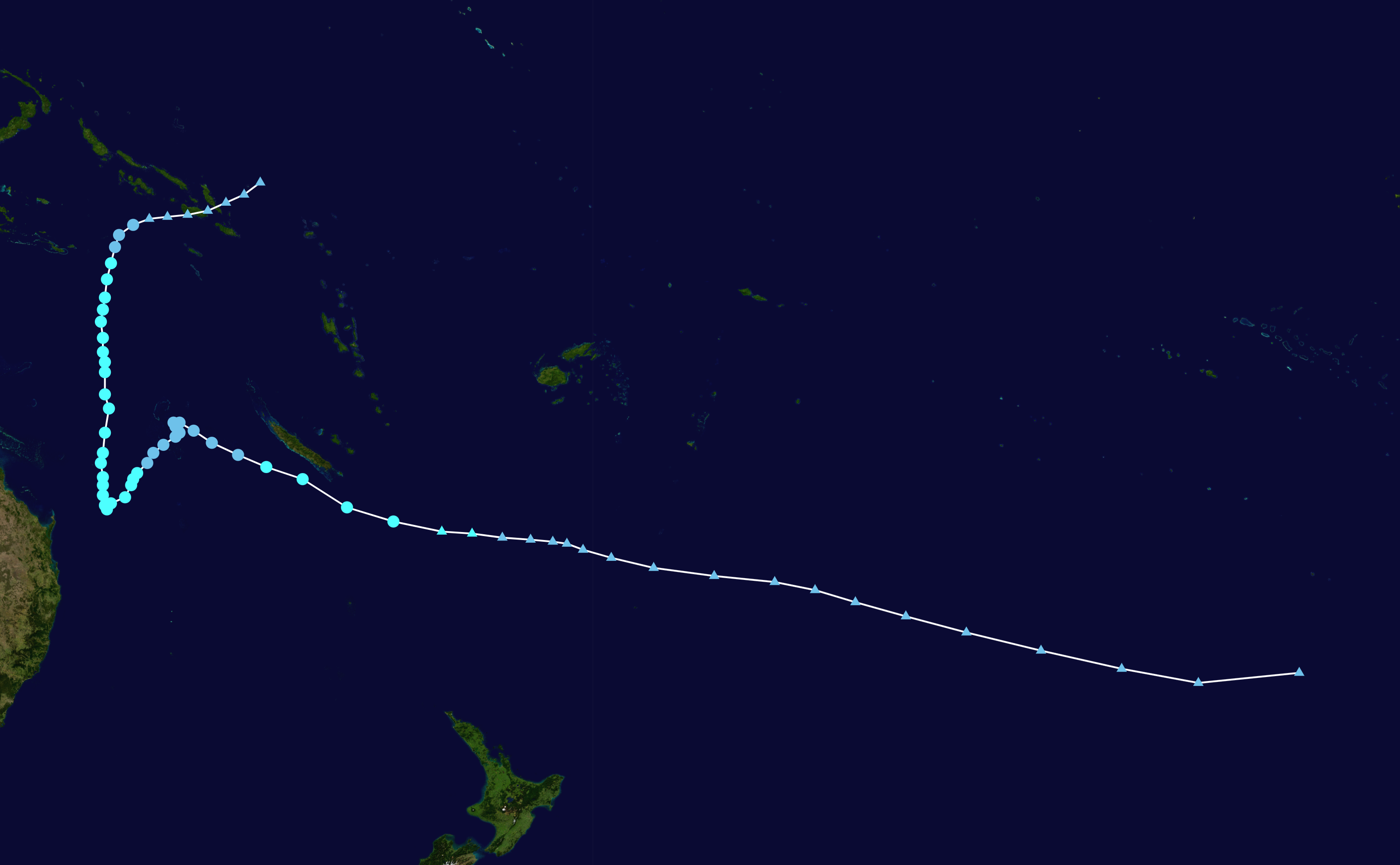
- Duration: 12 March – 20 March (Exited basin)
- Peak intensity: 110 km/h (70 mph) (10-min); 980 hPa (mbar)

Tropical Cyclone Roger peaked as a category 2 cyclone on March 15. On March 20, Roger exited the Australian region into the South Pacific.

=== Tropical Cyclone Monty ===
- Category 2 tropical cyclone (Australian scale)
- Tropical storm (SSHWS)
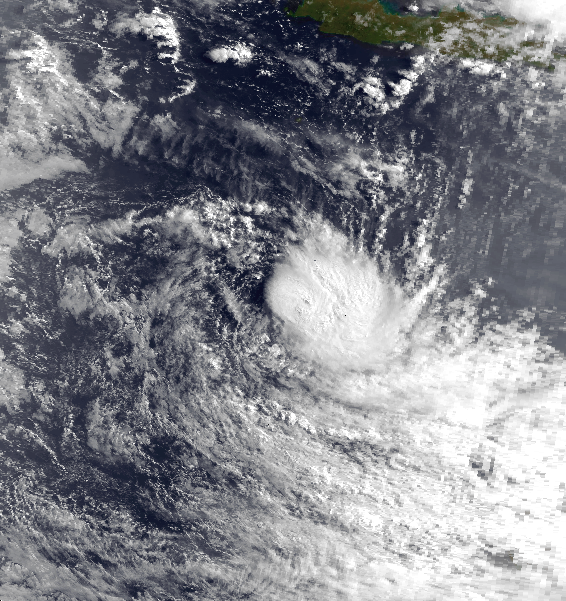
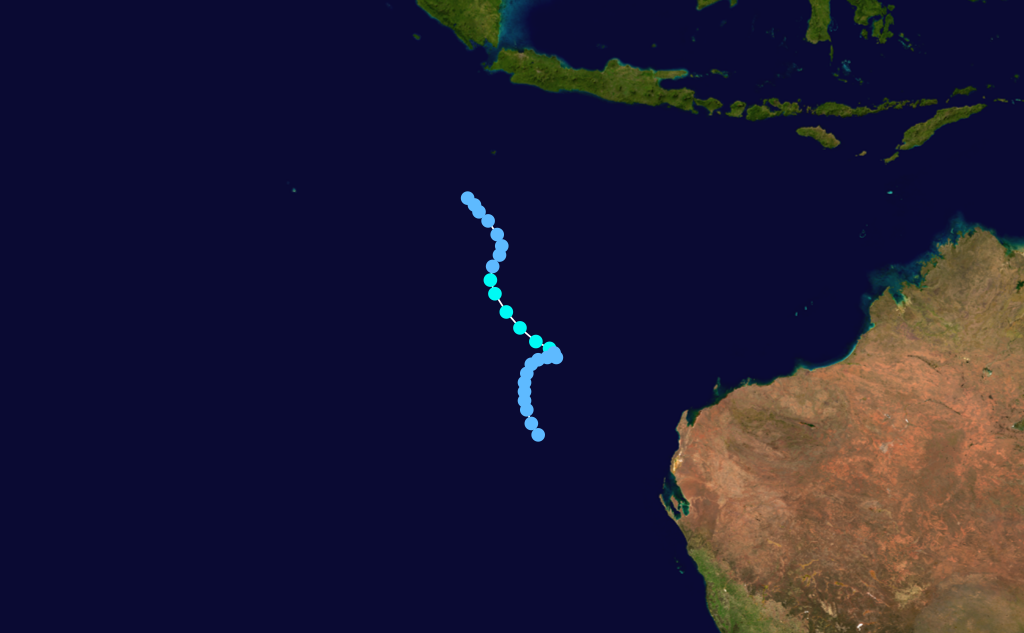
- Duration: 6 April – 15 April
- Peak intensity: 110 km/h (70 mph) (10-min); 992 hPa (mbar)

Tropical Cyclone Monty existed from 6 April to 15 April.

=== Severe Tropical Cyclone Adel ===
- Category 3 severe tropical cyclone (Australian scale)
- Tropical storm (SSHWS)
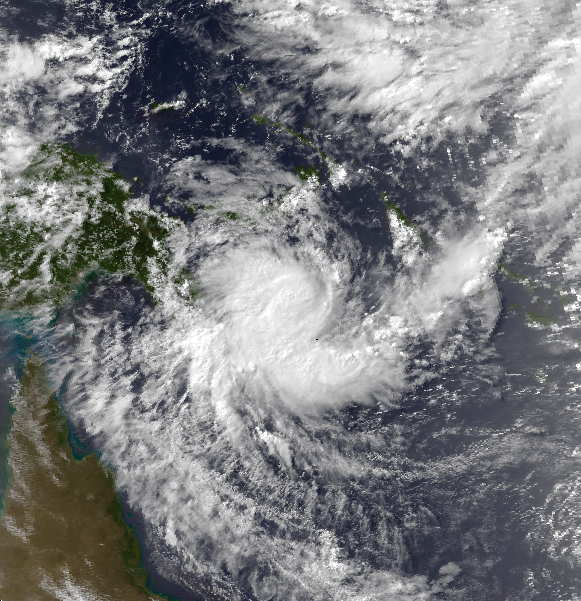
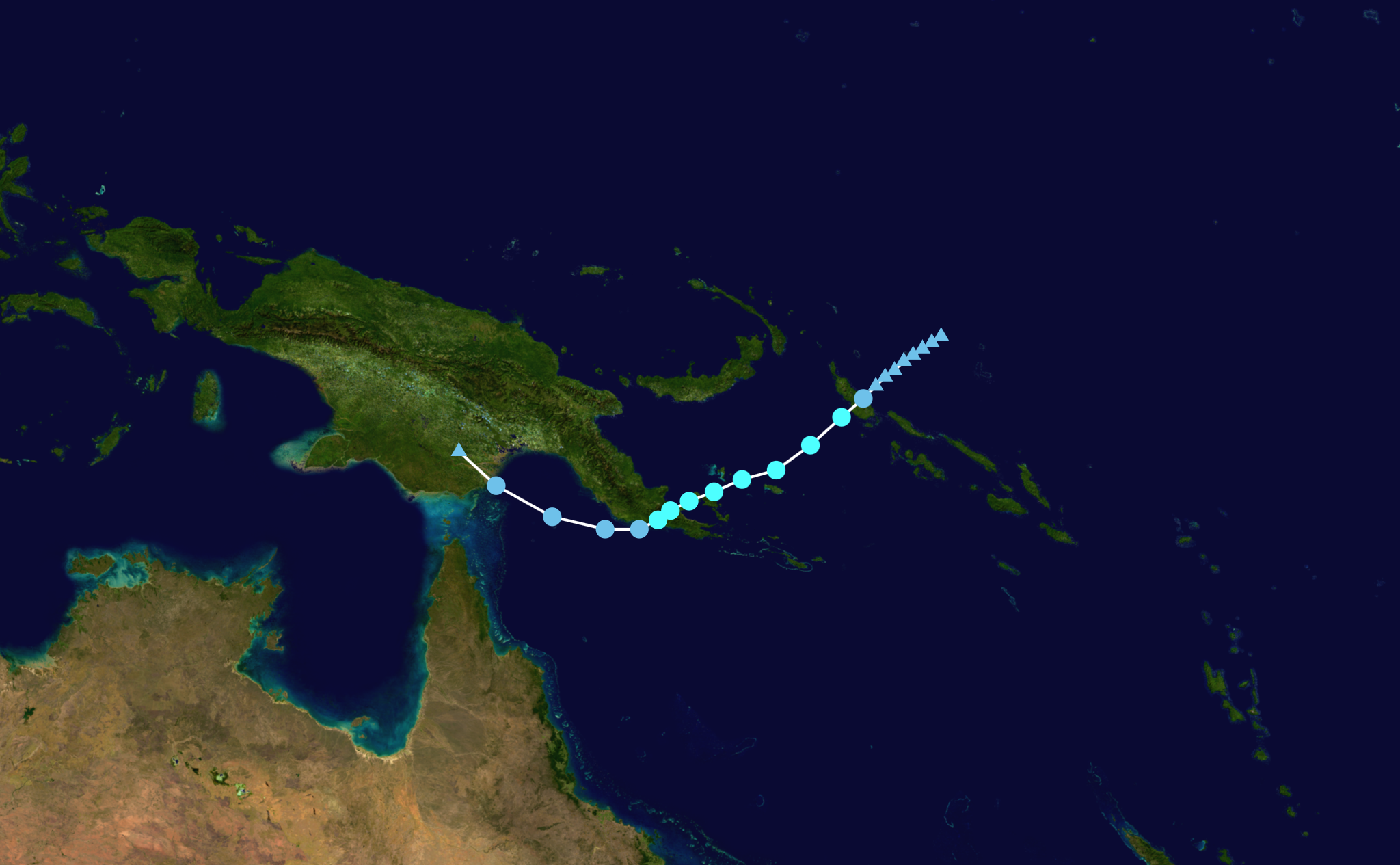
- Duration: 13 May – 15 May
- Peak intensity: 120 km/h (75 mph) (10-min); 970 hPa (mbar)

Adel lasted from 11–16 May 1993. During its life, it passed over Bougainville Island and near Goodenough Island, leaving two drowned and a total of at least 15 missing. Leaves were blown from trees, and 345 houses were destroyed, along with a radio tower that was bent over.

== Storm names ==
=== TCWC Perth ===
- Ken
- Lena
- Monty

=== TCWC Brisbane ===
- Nina
- Oliver
- Polly
- Roger

== Season Effects ==
Name	Dates	Peak intensity			Areas affected	Damage (USD)	Deaths	Refs
Name	Dates	Category	Wind speed	Pressure	Areas affected	Damage (USD)	Deaths	Refs
Ken	17 – 21 December 1992	Category 1 tropical cyclone	75 km/h (45 mph)	990 hPa (29.23 inHg)	Cocos Island	None	None	
Nina	21 December – 1 January	Category 3 severe tropical cyclone	140 km/h (85 mph)	960 hPa (28.34 inHg)	Queensland, Solomon Islands, Rotuma, Wallis and Futuna, Tuvalu, Tonga, Niue	None	None	
Lena	22 January – 2 February	Category 2 tropical cyclone	100 km/h (65 mph)	972 hPa (28.70 inHg)	None	None	None	
Oliver	3 – 14 February	Category 4 severe tropical cyclone	165 km/h (105 mph)	950 hPa (28.05 inHg)	Queensland	None	None	
Polly	25 – 28 February	Category 3 severe tropical cyclone	140 km/h (85 mph)	955 hPa (28.20 inHg)	None	None	None	
Roger	12 – 20 March	Category 2 tropical cyclone	110 km/h (70 mph)	980 hPa (28.93 inHg)	None	None	None	
Monty	6 – 13 April	Category 2 tropical cyclone	110 km/h (70 mph)	992 hPa (29.29 inHg)	None	None	None	
Adel	11 – 16 May	Category 3 severe tropical cyclone	120 km/h (75 mph)	970 hPa (28.64 inHg)	Papua New Guinea	Minimal	3	
Season aggregates
8 systems	17 December – 16 May		165 km/h (105 mph)	950 hPa (28.05 inHg)		$950 million	2	

== See also ==
- List of Southern Hemisphere tropical cyclone seasons
- Atlantic hurricane seasons: 1992, 1993
- Pacific hurricane seasons: 1992, 1993
- Pacific typhoon seasons: 1992, 1993
- North Indian Ocean cyclone seasons: 1992, 1993
