= Cyclone Urmil (2026) =

Damaging and Deadly South Pacific cyclone in 2026

Tropical Cyclone Urmil
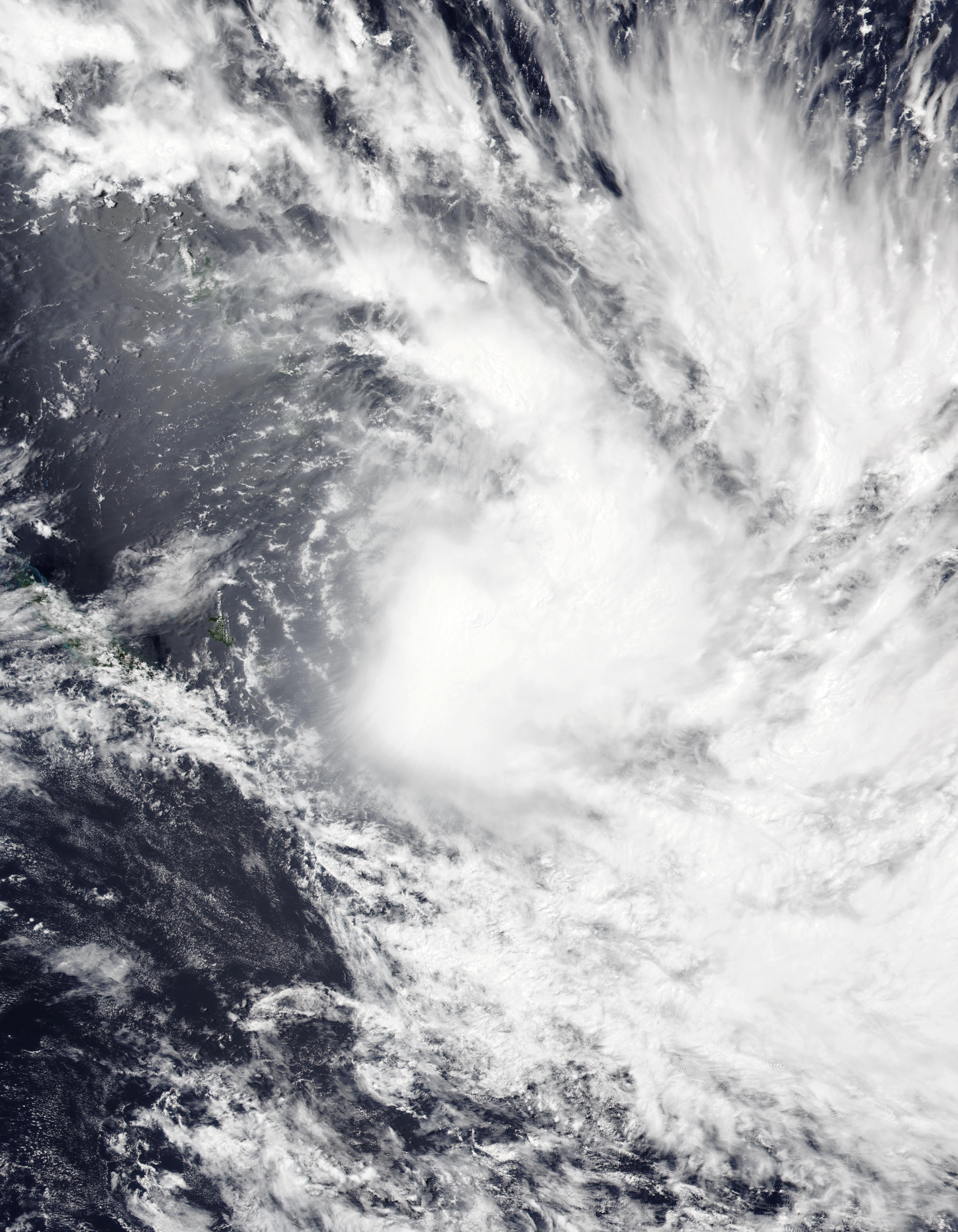
- Cyclone Urmil at its peak intensity late on 28 February

Meteorological history
- Formed: 26 February 2026
- Extratropical: 1 March 2026
- Dissipated: 5 March 2026

Category 2 tropical cyclone
- 10-minute sustained (FMS)
- Highest winds: 100 km/h (65 mph)
- Lowest pressure: 980 hPa (mbar); 28.94 inHg

Category 1-equivalent tropical cyclone
- 1-minute sustained (SSHWS/JTWC)
- Highest winds: 120 km/h (75 mph)
- Lowest pressure: 979 hPa (mbar); 28.91 inHg

Overall effects
- Fatalities: 1
- Damage: Unknown
- Areas affected: Fiji, Vanuatu
- Part of the 2025–26 South Pacific cyclone season

Tropical Cyclone Urmil was the first of two named tropical cyclones in the 2025–26 South Pacific cyclone season, the other being Cyclone Vaianu. It formed on 26 February, and eventually was named on 27 February, becoming the latest first named storm on record in the South Pacific, beating 2017's Cyclone Bart by 6 days (21 February).

A disturbance off the coast of Vanuatu developed into a tropical disturbance, being marked as 09F on 26 February, with the JTWC subsequently marking it Tropical Depression 23P. Later that day the JTWC upgraded it to a tropical storm, with it officially becoming a tropical depression. On 27 February, the system became a Category 1 tropical cyclone, receiving the name Urmil. Later that day, Urmil started a period of intensification, becoming a Category 2 on the Fiji scale. On 28 February, it reached its peak intensity of 65 mph, and a central pressure of 980 mb, with the JTWC upgrading it to a Category 1 briefly.

However, after this it started a weakening period, with it being downgraded back to a Category 1, due to it moving closer to colder sea temperatures and the mid-latitudes along with increasing wind shear. The next day, it crossed into MetService's area of responsibility, which it was reclassified as an extratropical cyclone. At the same time, the JTWC classified it as a subtropical storm, before it became post-tropical. The system drifted into colder waters as it made a turn to the east. The system finally dissipated on 5 March.

The cyclone caused severe impacts to Fiji and Vanuatu, causing severe damage in both countries and one fatality.

== Meteorological history ==
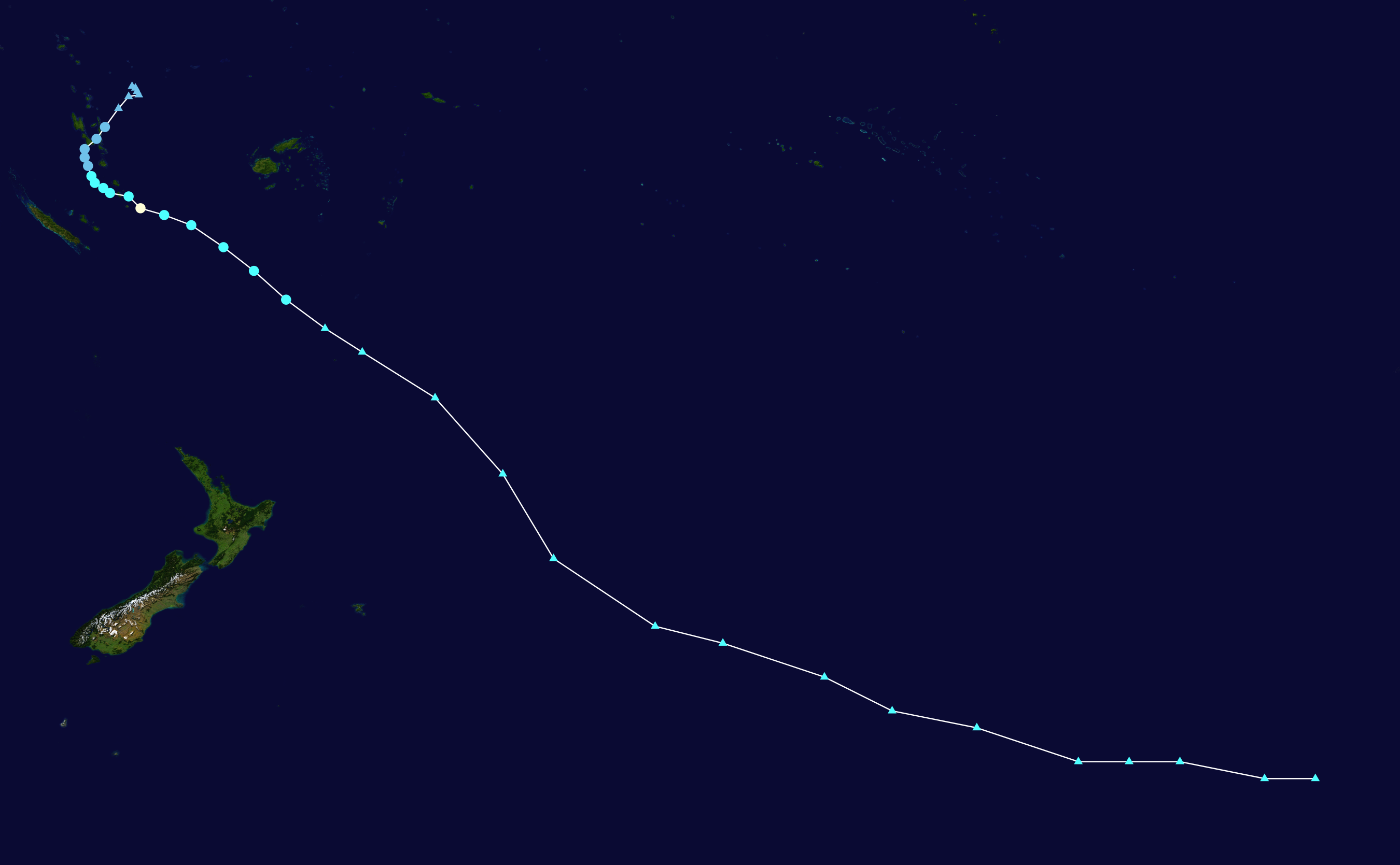
Map plotting the storm's track and intensity, according to the Saffir–Simpson scale Map key Saffir–Simpson scale Tropical depression (≤38 mph, ≤62 km/h) Tropical storm (39–73 mph, 63–118 km/h) Category 1 (74–95 mph, 119–153 km/h) Category 2 (96–110 mph, 154–177 km/h) Category 3 (111–129 mph, 178–208 km/h) Category 4 (130–156 mph, 209–251 km/h) Category 5 (≥157 mph, ≥252 km/h) Unknown Storm type Tropical cyclone Subtropical cyclone Extratropical cyclone, remnant low, tropical disturbance, or monsoon depression

On 23 February, the JTWC was tracking a low pressure area that was off the coast of Vanuatu. At the same time, the Fiji Meteorological Serice (FMS) forecasted a low to form and become a cyclone in under 5 days. The next day, the FMS analyzed it as a low pressure area and started tracking it, noting it was northeast of Port Vila. It was also located in a favorable environment, with little to no windshear, the system started to gradually develop over the next few days. On 26 February, the JTWC issued a Tropical Cyclone Formation Alert (TCFA), noting the system had a high chance of developing within the next 24 hours, while the FMS classified it as Tropical Disturbance 09F. Later that day, the FMS upgraded it into a Tropical Depression, with the JTWC simultaneously upgraded the system into a tropical storm, calling it Tropical Cyclone 23P. On 27 February, the FMS upgraded it into a Category 1 Tropical Cyclone, naming it Urmil. When the system got named, it became the latest first named Tropical Cyclone in the South Pacific, beating the old record set by Cyclone Bart, on 21 February 2017. The system started to gradually intensify, with the FMS upgrading it into a Category 2 Tropical Cyclone.

On 28 February, the system reached its peak intensity of 55 kn (100 km/h; 65 mph) (10 min sustained) and a central pressure of 980mb, with the JTWC briefly upgrading it to a Category 1, with winds of 65 kn (120 km/h; 75 mph) and a central pressure of 979mb. However, after it reached its peak, it found itself in an unfavorable environment with colder sea-surface temperatures, and moderate wind shear as it entered the mid-latitudes. Urmil started to weaken over the course of multiple days, weakening all the way down to a Category 1 Tropical Cyclone. The next day, it entered the MetService's area of responsibility, with it being reclassified as extratropical. The JTWC also classified it as a Subtropical Storm at the same time, noting it had a low chance of becoming a tropical cyclone again. After its final advisory, it became extratropical, and over the course of multiple days, drifted around erratically in the South Pacific, before exiting the basin and finally dissipating on 5 March.

== Preparations and impact ==
=== Fiji ===
Heavy Rain Warnings were issued for the Western, Central, and Northern Divisions as Urmil approached, accompanied by Flash Flood Alerts for flood-prone and low-lying areas. Strong Wind Warnings were also in effect for coastal and marine zones, where rough seas and hazardous swells were expected. Authorities advised residents to avoid flooded crossings, secure loose property, and monitor rapidly changing conditions as the systems rainbands moved over the country.

Although Urmil did not make landfall in Fiji, its large outer bands produced heavy rainfall, gusty winds, and widespread flash flooding across the Western Division. The Fiji Government also reported the severe weather caused a child to drown, whose body was later recovered from a creek in Namoli at Kaleli Settlement, outside Lautoka City. Rapid rises in waterways and poor visibility created dangerous conditions across many communities.

Flooding and washouts caused significant disruption to infrastructure. Government officials stated that around 115 roads were affected, with many routes restricted or fully closed due to inundation, debris, or structural damage. Several rural communities experienced temporary isolation as floodwaters cut off access to roads. Power and water supply interruptions also occurred, with multiple water sources and treatment facilities impacted by high amounts of storm runoff, prompting emergency maintenance and monitoring.

Concerns about food shortages in flood-affected regions led authoritiies to initiate agricultural damage assessments, particularly in areas where crops and livestock were exposed to standing water. The flooding also forced the closure of 5 schools in the Western Division, which were converted into evacuation centers to shelter displaced residents and provide temporary relief services.

=== Vanuatu ===
Tropical Cyclone Alerts, Heavy Rainfall Warnings, Strong Wind Warnings, and Coastal Flood Alerts were issued for several provinces in advance of the system. The Vanuatu Meterology Department warned of deteriorating conditions, advising communities to secure property, avoid coastal areas, and prepare for potential flooding and hazardous seas.

Cyclone Urmil passed near Pentecost, Malekula, and Ambrym while classified as Tropical Depression 09F, bringing periods of heavy rainfall, strong winds, and rough seas to much of the central islands. Storm surge and coastal inundation affected low-lying shorelines, while very heavy rainfall was forecast for the southern islands as the system moved southward. Although impacts were minimal and generally limited, the severe weather caused localized flooding, hazardous marine conditions, and minor disruptions across exposed communities.

== See also ==
- Weather of 2026
- Tropical cyclones in 2026
- Cyclone Bart (2017), the storm holding the original record.
- Cyclone Vaianu (2026), the only other named storm of the season.
