= 2025–26 South Pacific cyclone season =

Cyclone season in the South Pacific Ocean

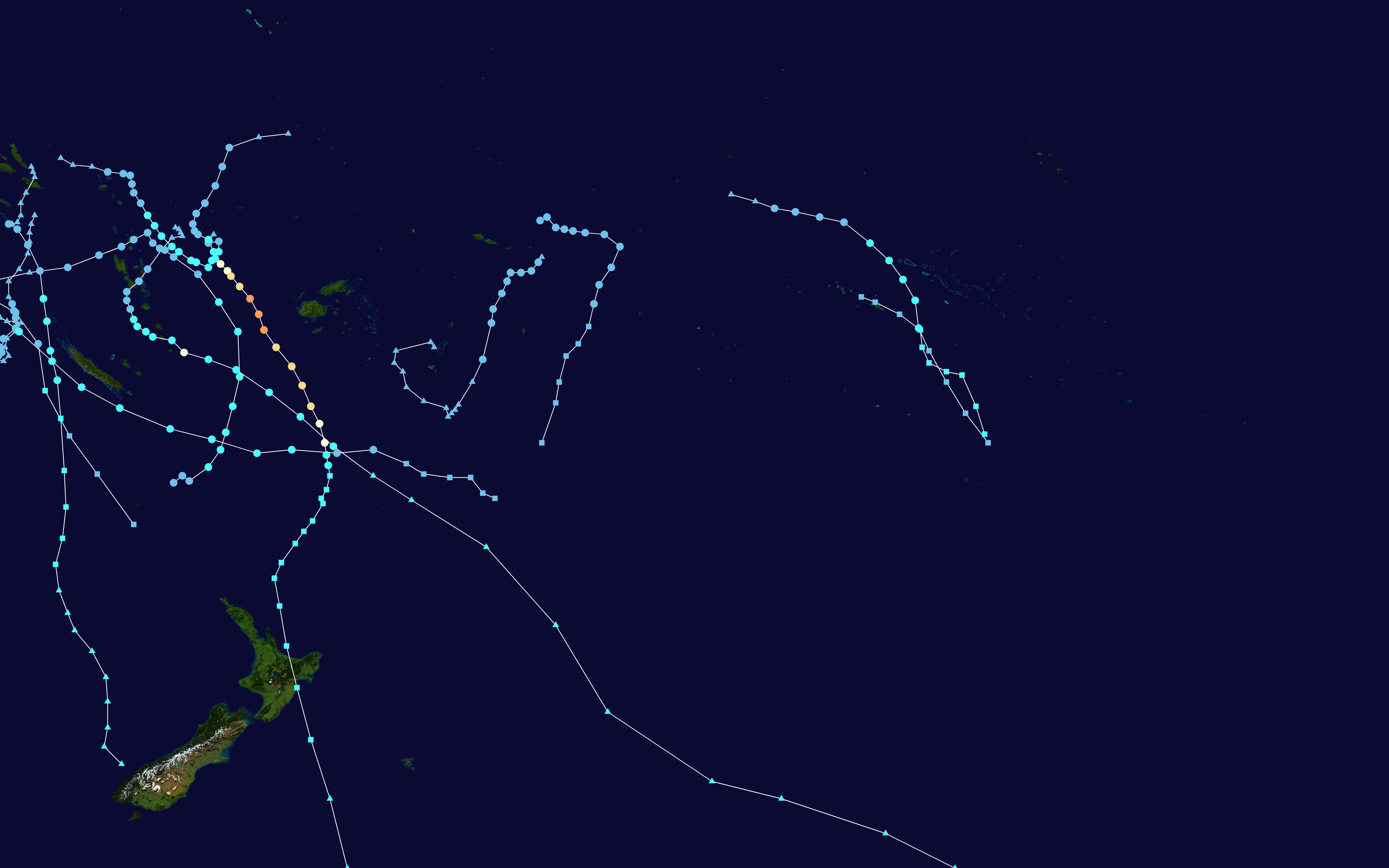
- Season summary map

Seasonal boundaries
- First system formed: 2 December 2025
- Last system dissipated: 9 April 2026

Strongest storm
- Name: Vaianu
  - Maximum winds: 155 km/h (100 mph) (10-minute sustained)
  - Lowest pressure: 945 hPa (mbar)

Seasonal statistics
- Total disturbances: 11, 1 unofficial
- Total depressions: 7, 1 unofficial
- Tropical cyclones: 2 (record low, tied with 1990–91), 1 unofficial
- Severe tropical cyclones: 1
- Total fatalities: 11 total
- Total damage: $46.8 million (2025 USD)

Related articles
- 2025–26 Australian region cyclone season; 2025–26 South-West Indian Ocean cyclone season

The 2025–26 South Pacific cyclone season, with only 2 tropical cyclones forming, was the least active South Pacific cyclone season on record, tied with the 1990-91 season, characterized by the latest forming named storm in recorded history. While the season officially began on 1 November 2025 and concluded on 30 April 2026, the first named system, Urmil, did not develop until late February. This record-breaking delay surpassed the previous benchmark set during the 2016–17 season. The season's inactivity was primarily attributed to a poorly organised South Pacific Convergence Zone (SPCZ) and the failure of a predicted La Niña event to fully materialise, which left atmospheric conditions unfavourable for cyclogenesis for much of the summer. Despite the low number of named storms, the season was notable for the rapid intensification of Vaianu in April, which became the most intense system of the period and ended a multi-year drought of major cyclones in the basin.

The season officially started on 1 November 2025, and ended on 30 April 2026; however a tropical cyclone could form at any time between 1 July 2025, and 30 June 2026, and would count towards the season total. During the season, tropical cyclones will be officially monitored by the Fiji Meteorological Service, Australian Bureau of Meteorology and New Zealand's MetService. The United States Armed Forces through the Joint Typhoon Warning Center (JTWC) will also monitor the basin and issue unofficial warnings for American interests. The FMS attaches a number and an F suffix to tropical disturbances that form in or move into the basin while the JTWC designates significant tropical cyclones with a number and a P suffix. The BoM, FMS and MetService all use the Australian Tropical Cyclone Intensity Scale and estimate windspeeds with a period of approximately ten minutes, while the JTWC estimates sustained winds over a 1-minute period, which are subsequently compared to the Saffir–Simpson hurricane wind scale (SSHWS).

== Seasonal forecasts ==
Source/Record	Region	Tropical Cyclone	Severe Tropical Cyclones	Ref
Records
Average (1969–70 – 2024–25):	160°E – 120°W	7	3	
Record high:	160°E – 120°W	1997–98: 16	1982–83: 9	
Record low:	160°E – 120°W	1990–91: 2	2008–09: 0	
Predictions
ESNZ October	135°E – 120°W	5–9	2–4	
FMS Whole	160°E – 120°W	4–5	1–3	
FMS Western	160°E – 180°	2–3	1–2	
FMS Eastern	180° – 120°W	2–3	0–1	

Ahead of the season officially starting on 1 November, the Fiji Meteorological Service (FMS) and Earth Sciences New Zealand (ESNZ), both issued a tropical cyclone outlook that discussed the upcoming season. These outlooks took into account a variety of factors such as a developing weak to moderate La Niña event and what had happened in previous seasons such as 1980–81, 1983–84, 1984–85, 1995–96, 2000–01, 2001–02, 2003–04, 2005–06, 2008–09, 2011–12, 2012–13, 2016–17, 2017–18, 2020–21 and 2021–22. The Southwest Pacific tropical cyclone outlook issued by Earth Sciences New Zealand (ESNZ) in conjunction with MetService and various other Pacific meteorological services, predicted that five to nine tropical cyclones would occur over the South Pacific Ocean between 135°E and 120°W. The outlook also predicted that two to four of these tropical cyclones would intensify further and become either a Category three, four or five severe tropical cyclone on the Australian tropical cyclone intensity scale. In addition to contributing towards the Southwest Pacific tropical cyclone outlook, the FMS predicted that four or five tropical cyclones would occur within the basin, while one to three of these tropical cyclones were expected to intensify further and become either a category three, four or five severe tropical cyclone on the Australian scale.

== Seasonal summary ==
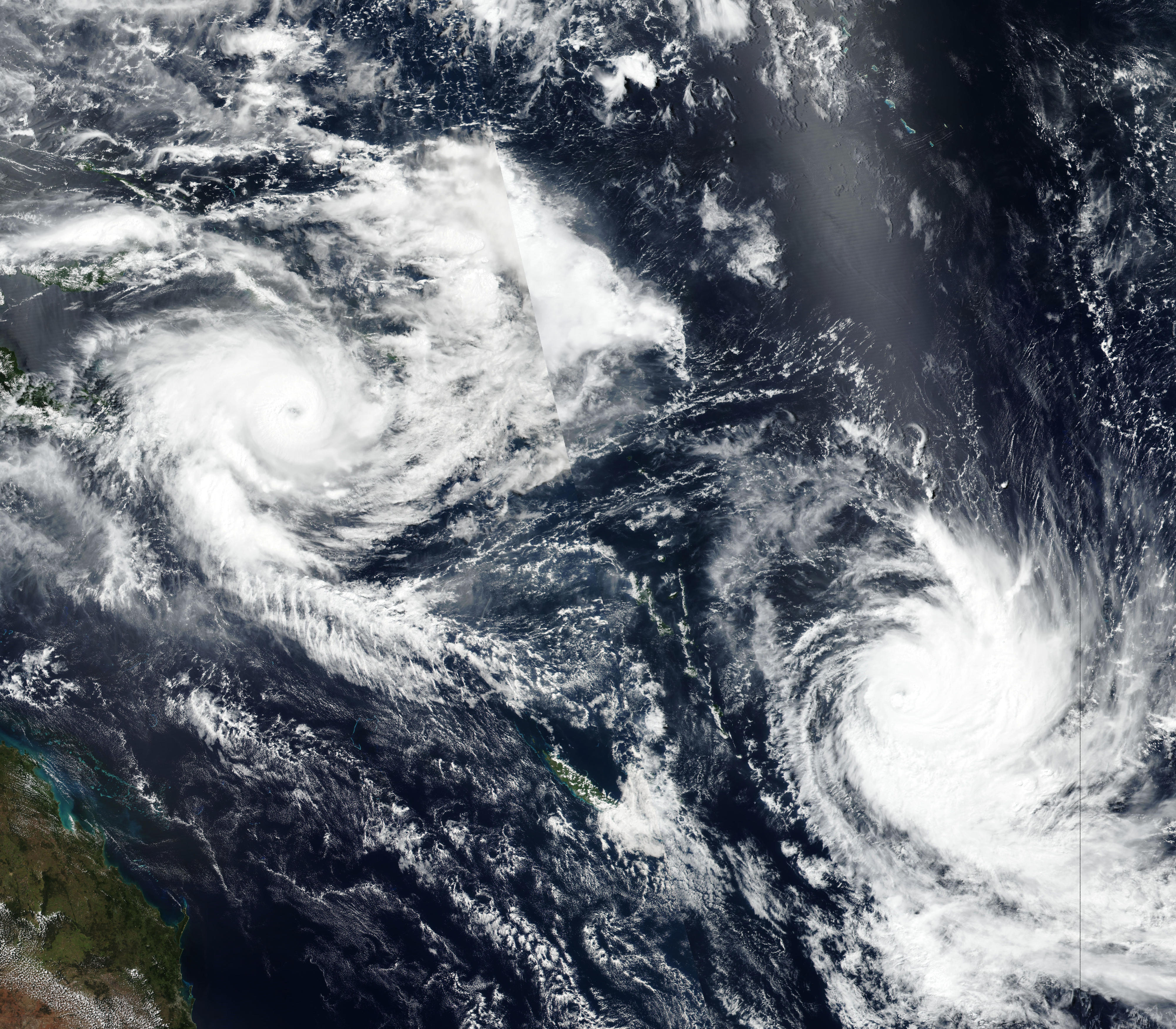
Twin cyclones Maila (left) in the Solomon Sea and Vaianu (right) near Fiji simultaneously active on April 7, 2026

The first tropical disturbance of the season developed during December 2. However, over the next few months, no named tropical cyclones developed. This was attributed to a number of factors, including a poorly organised South Pacific convergence zone and a predicted La Niña episode not developing. Four months after the beginning of the season, the first named storm, Urmil, developed on February 27, becoming the latest-forming first named tropical cyclone of a season within the South Pacific basin, breaking the record set by Tropical Cyclone Bart during the 2016–17 season. After a month-long lull, Vaianu formed and rapidly intensified into a severe tropical cyclone, the first in the basin since Cyclone Mal in 2023, ending the longest streak of seasons without a severe tropical cyclone of such intensity in the satellite era.

== Systems ==
=== Tropical Depression 02F ===
- Tropical depression (Australian scale)
- Tropical storm (SSHWS)
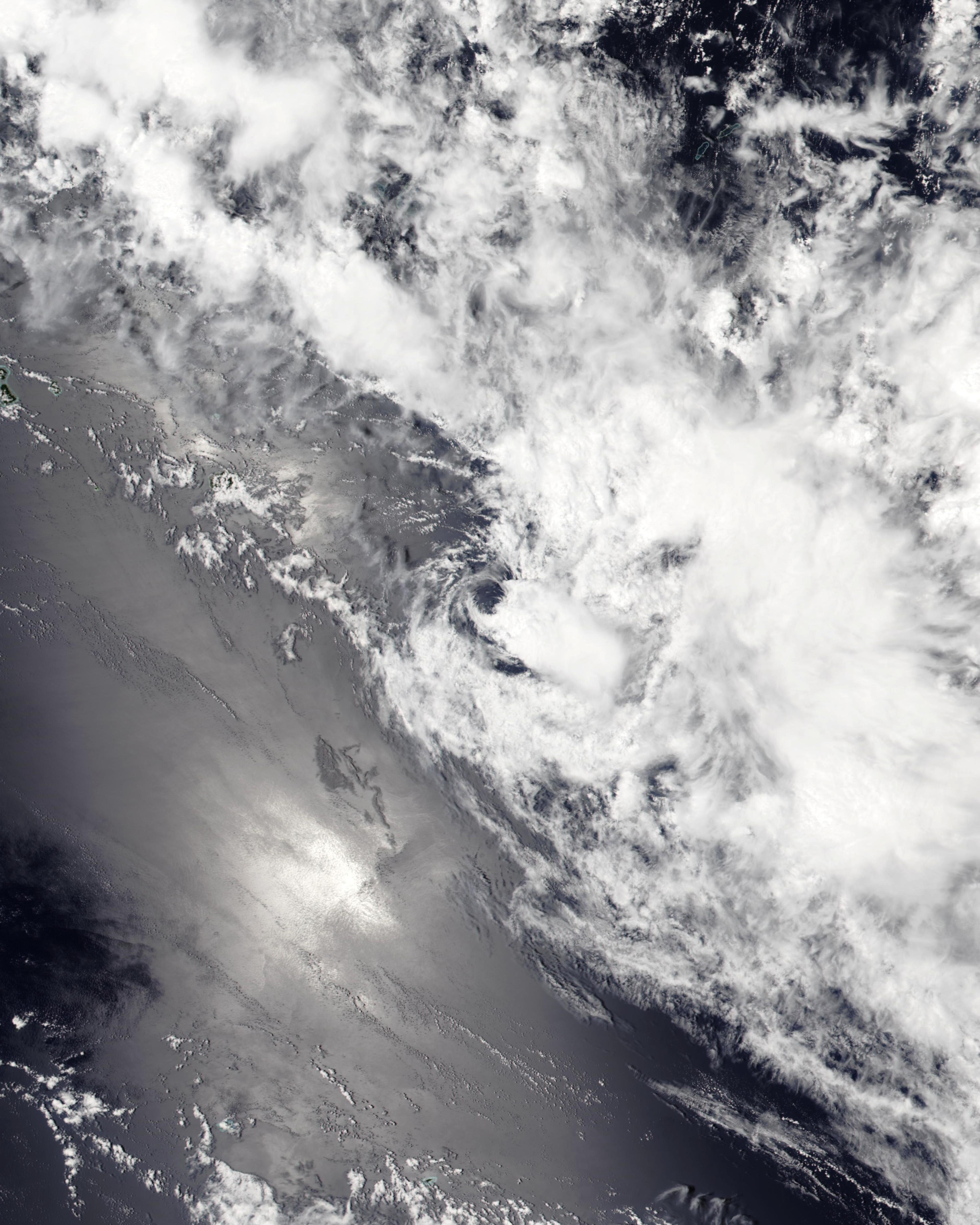
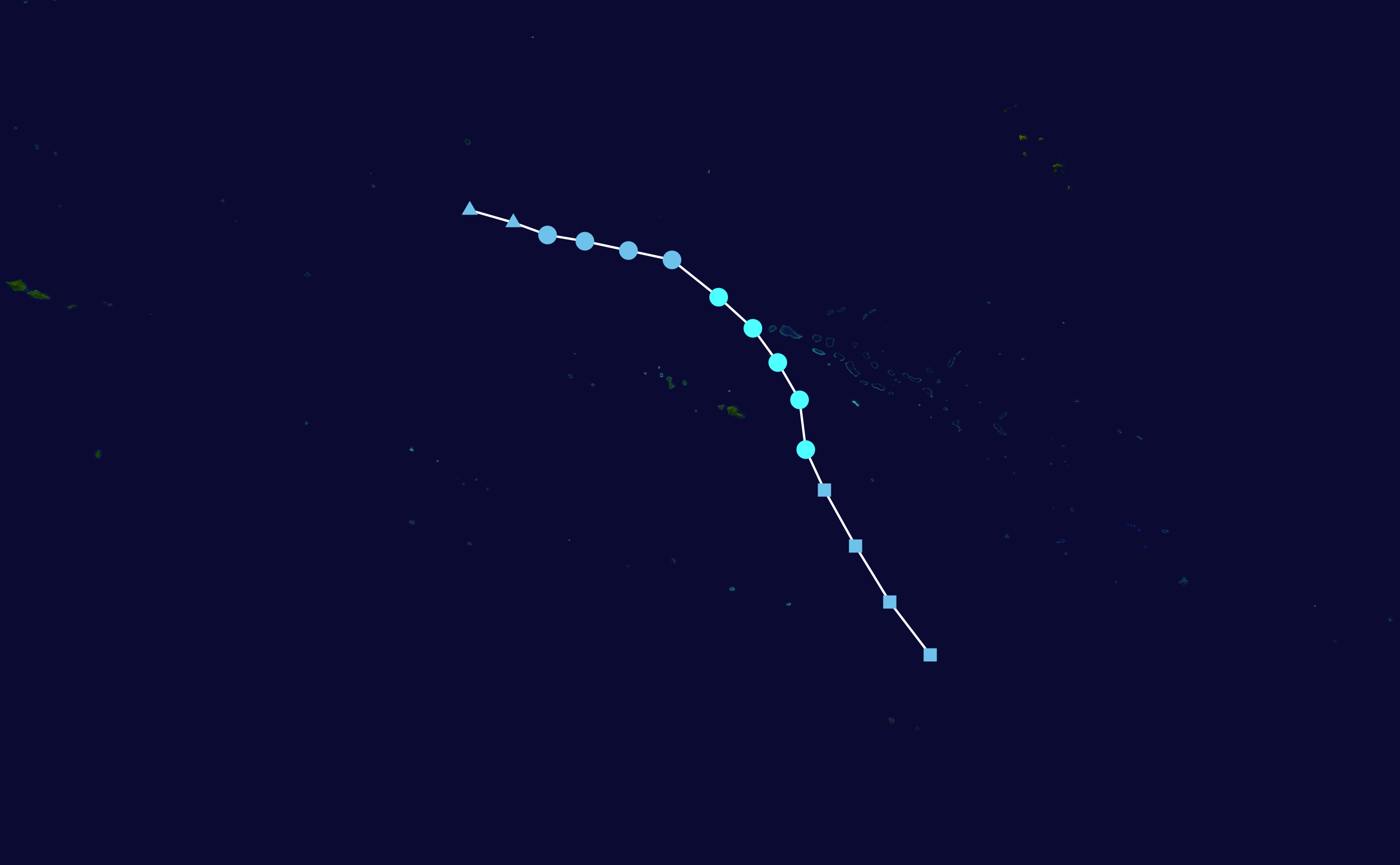
- Duration: 5 December – 6 December
- Peak intensity: 55 km/h (35 mph) (10-min); 1000 hPa (mbar)

On 5 December, JTWC started monitoring Tropical Cyclone 06P, embedded within the South Pacific Convergence Zone, 216 nmi north of Papeete, Tahiti. The cyclone was extremely compact and had rapidly consolidated over the preceding 24 hours. Later that day, FMS identified the cyclone as Tropical Disturbance 02F and noted the potential for strengthening in a favorable environment with low vertical wind shear and warm sea surface temperatures. 02F was upgraded to a tropical depression by FMS on late night of 5 December, but the system quickly came under the influence of moderate shear which exposed the system's low-level circulation center. JTWC ceased warnings later that day and downgraded the cyclone to a subtropical depression. The depression was last noted on 6 December, as the sheared system accelerated southeastward.

=== Tropical Depression 03F ===
- Tropical depression (Australian scale)
- Tropical storm (SSHWS)
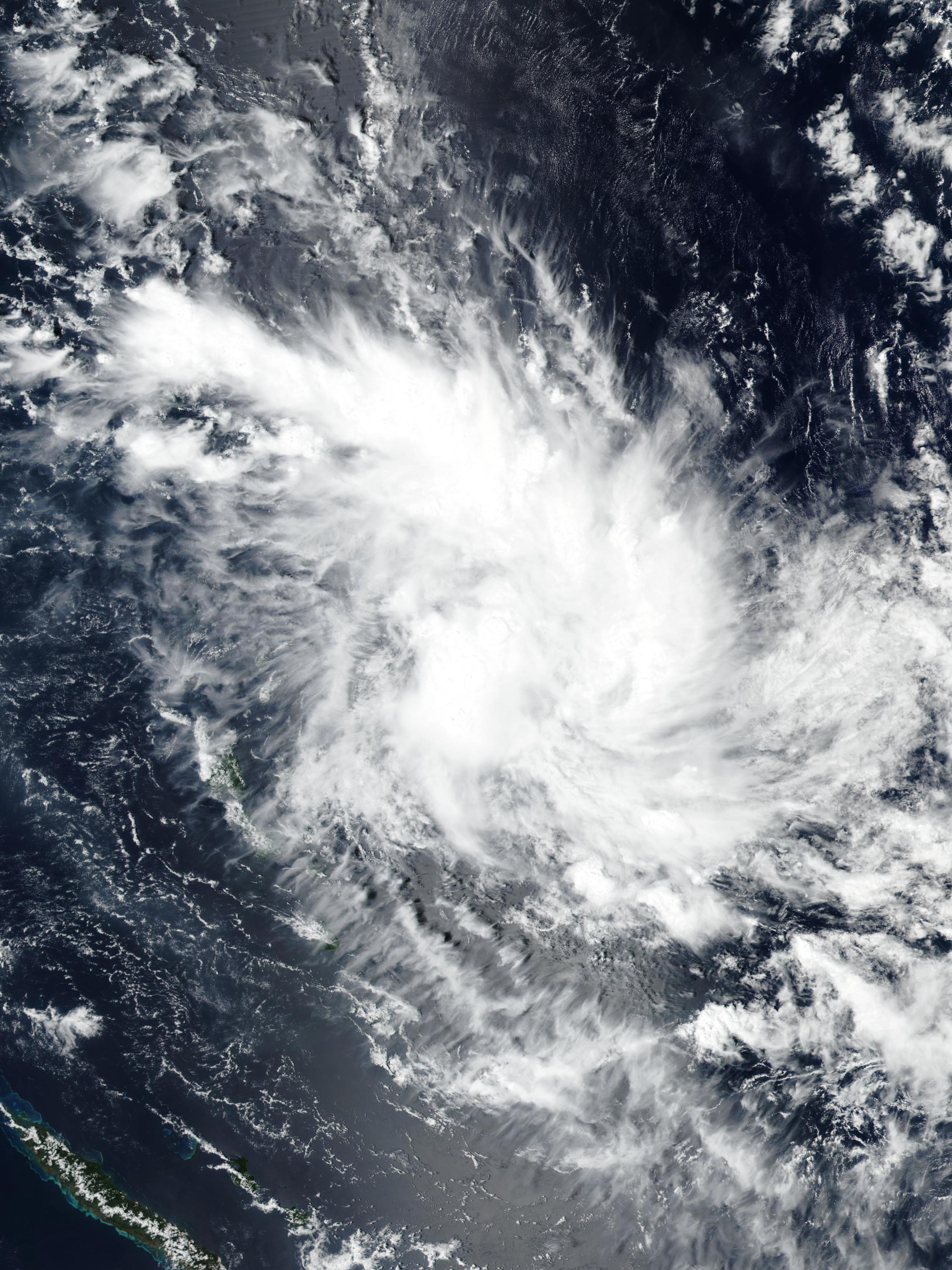
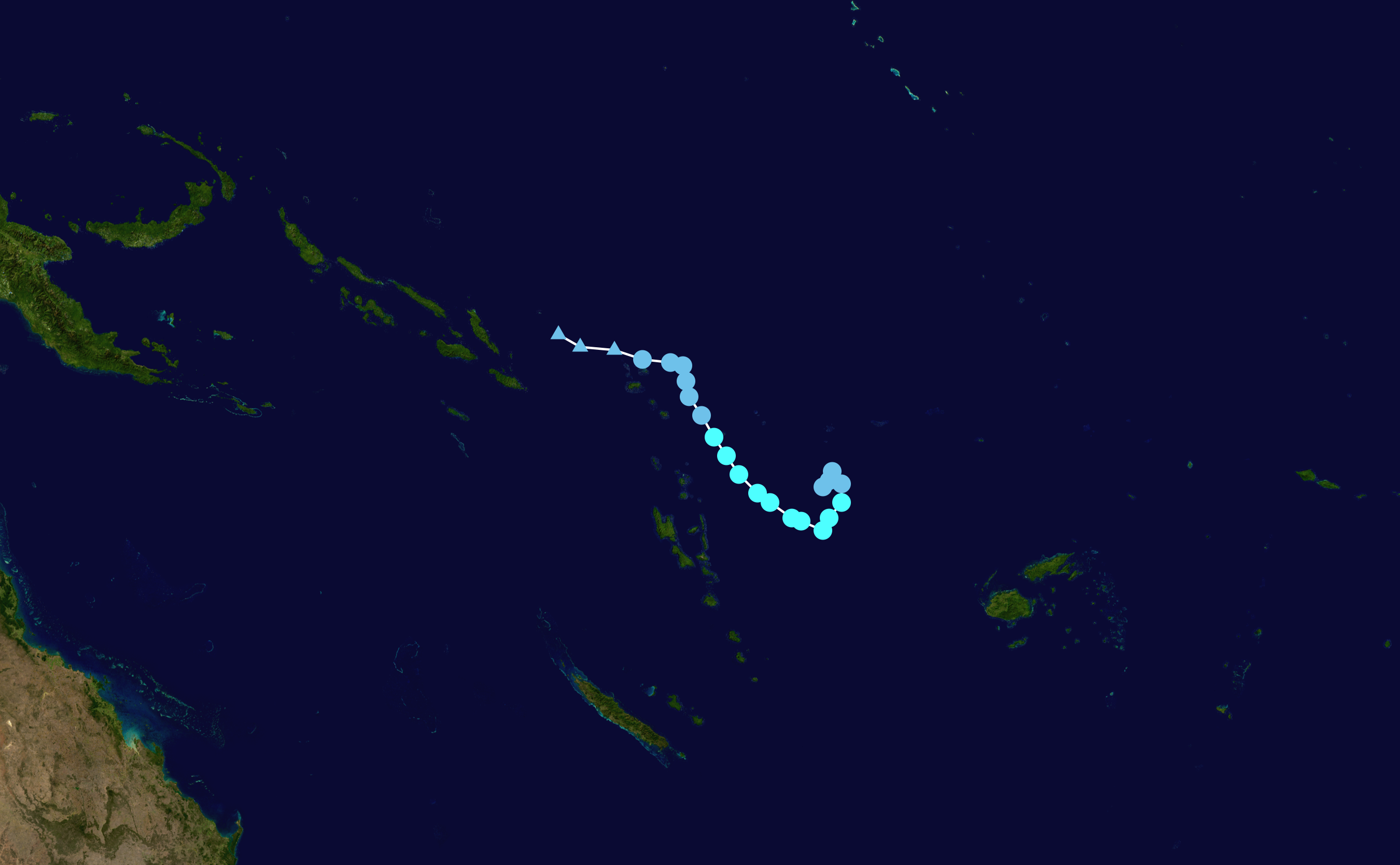
- Duration: 10 December – 14 December
- Peak intensity: 55 km/h (35 mph) (10-min); 1000 hPa (mbar)

On December 10th, a low pressure area developed east of the Solomon Islands, which was designated as Tropical Disturbance 03F. A few days later, on December 13th, the JTWC designated it as Tropical Cyclone 08P. On the 14th, it was classified as a Tropical Depression and reached its peak intensity of 1-min sustained winds of 40 kn (75 km/h; 45 mph), and a central pressure of 1000 hPa (mbar).

On the 15th, the system started to weaken due to entering an unfavorable environment with increased windshear, and on the 16th, collapsed into a remnant low, that was tracked by the JTWC until the 17th.

=== Tropical Disturbance 05F ===
- Tropical disturbance (Australian scale)
- Subtropical storm (SSHWS)
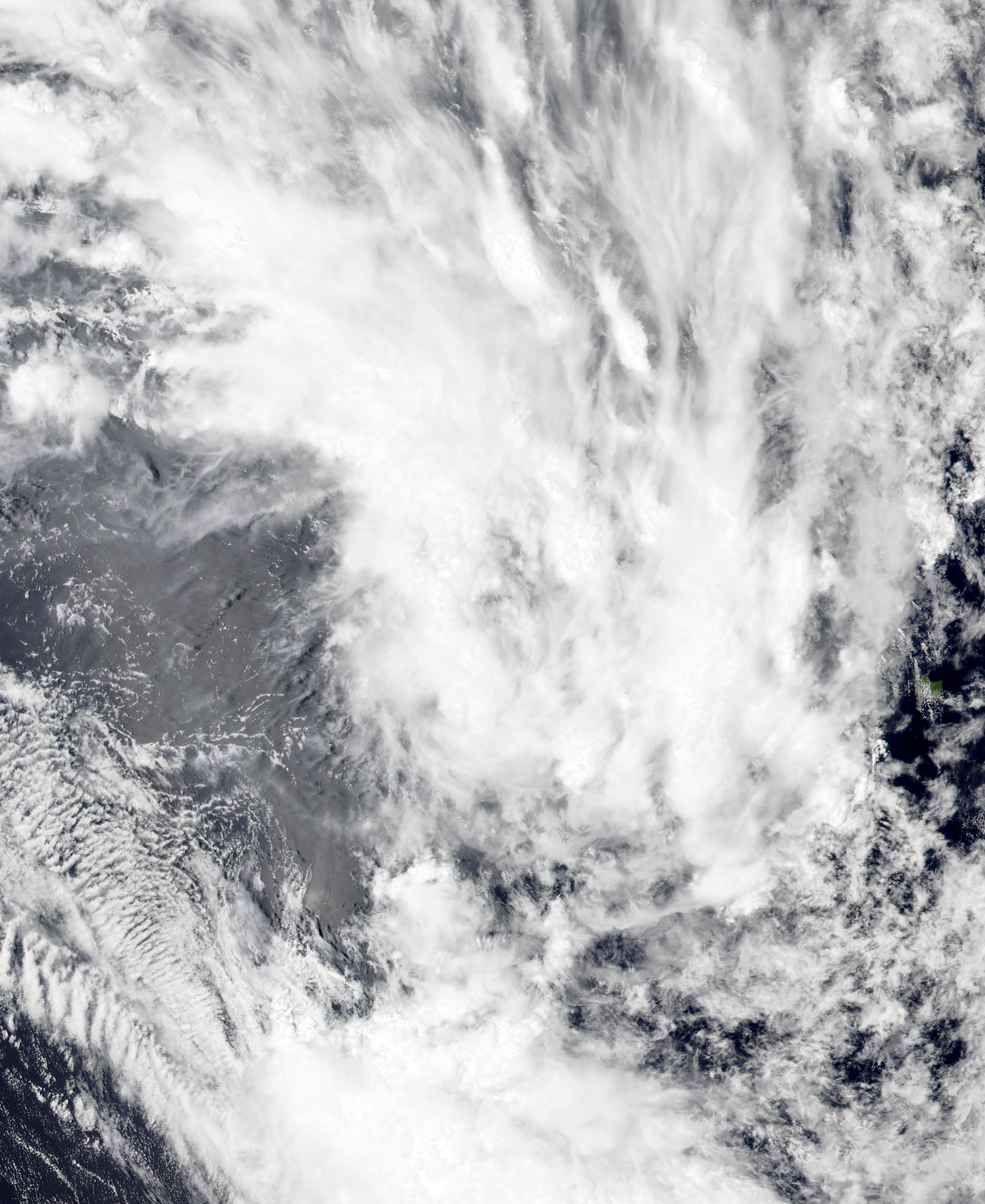
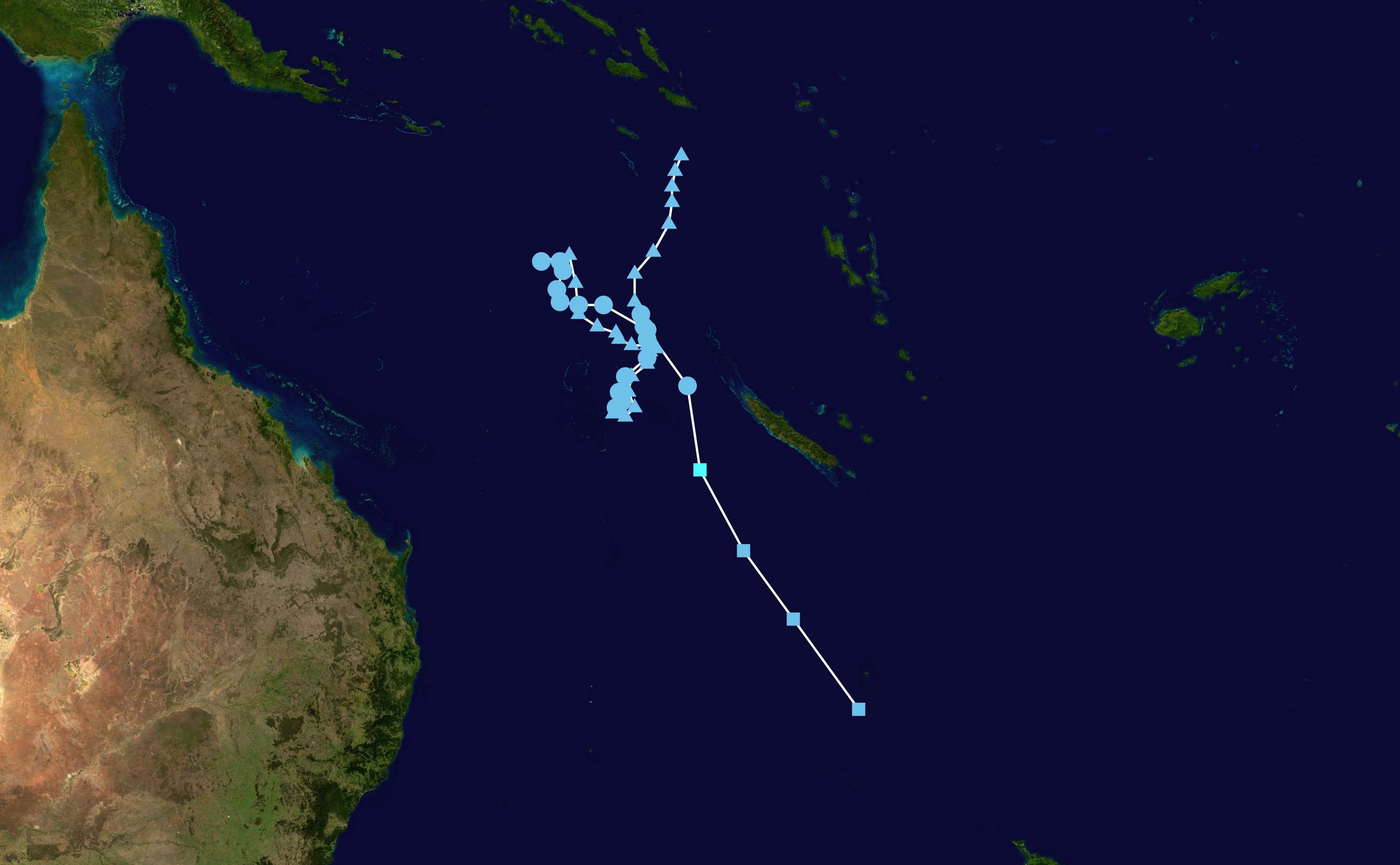
- Duration: 19 January (Entered basin) – 20 January
- Peak intensity: 45 km/h (30 mph) (10-min); 994 hPa (mbar)

Tropical Low 14U entered the South Pacific basin from the Australian region late on the night of 19 January. It was designated Tropical Disturbance 05F by the Fiji Meteorological Service upon crossover. On the 20th, the Joint Typhoon Warning Center (JTWC) classified it as a subtropical cyclone. On 21 January, the system transitioned into an extratropical cyclone and had severe impacts in northern New Zealand. MetService issued Red Warnings for heavy rainfall in some regions of the North Island. Ten people were confirmed dead.

=== Tropical Depression 06F ===
- Tropical depression (Australian scale)
- Tropical storm (SSHWS)
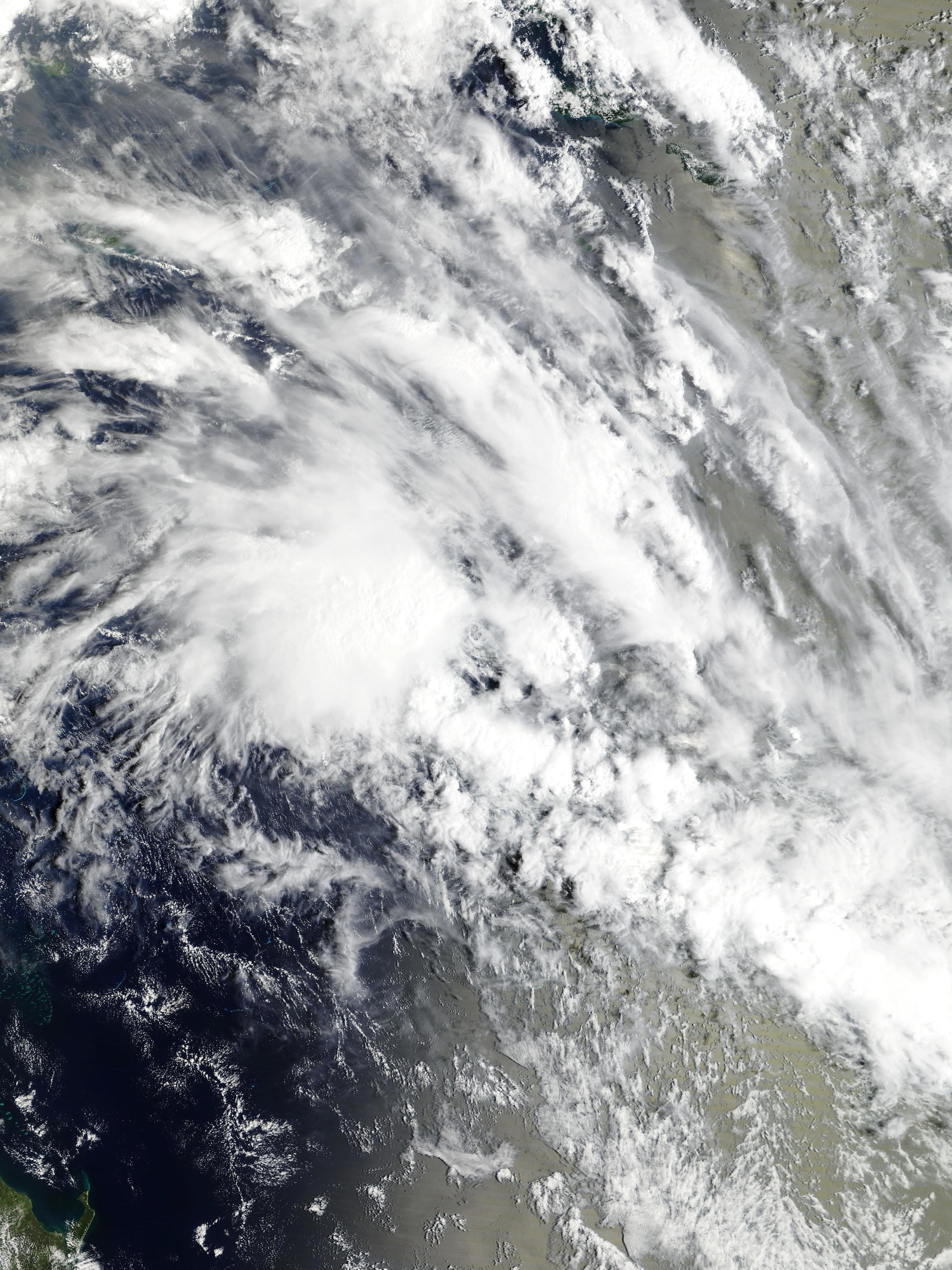
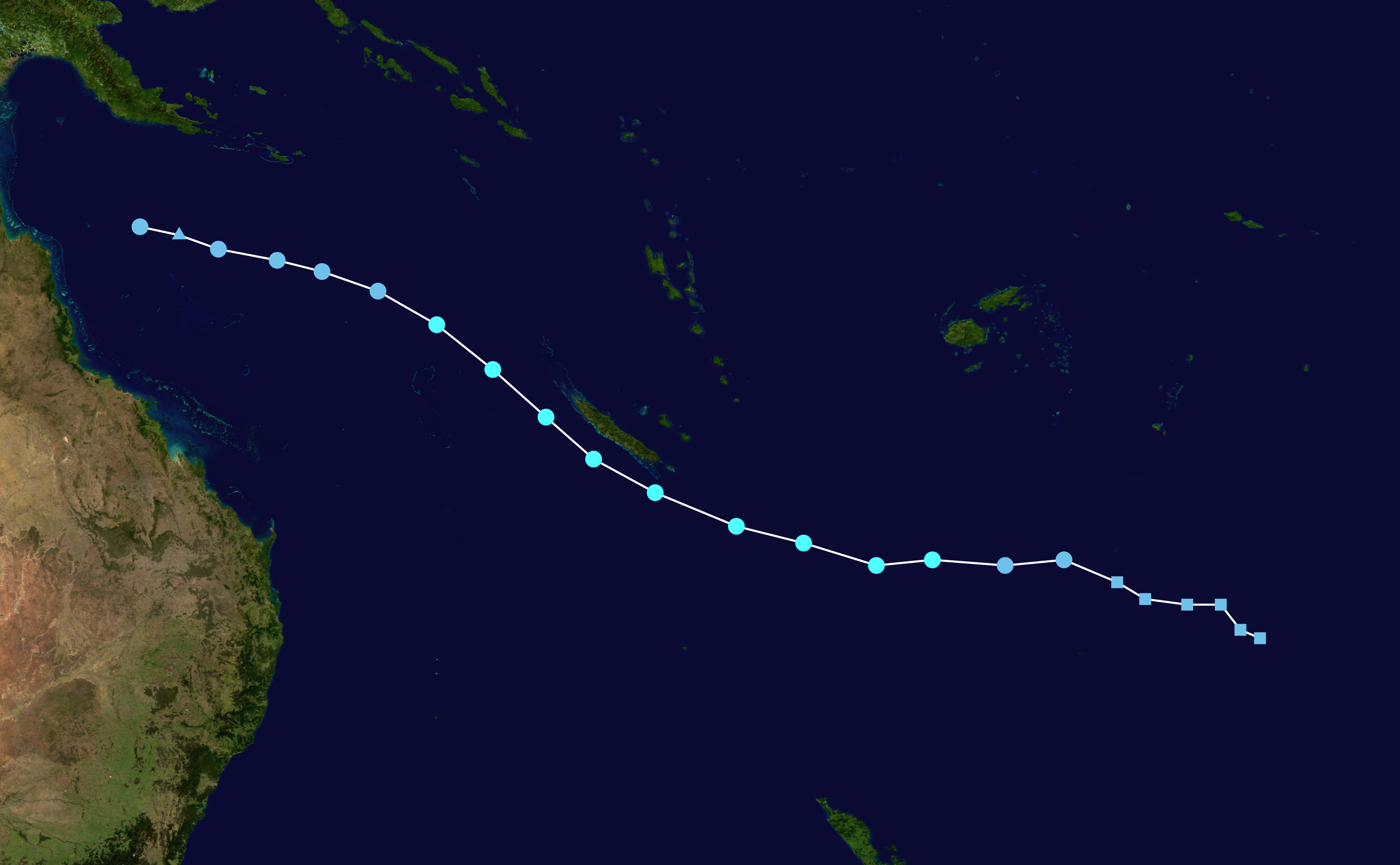
- Duration: 21 January – 22 January
- Peak intensity: 55 km/h (35 mph) (10-min); 994 hPa (mbar)

On January 20, a tropical low that developed within the South Pacific Convergence Zone in mid-January 2026. On January 21, at 06:00 UTC, the (JTWC) began monitoring the system as a tropical disturbance, designating it as Tropical Cyclone 16P. At this time, the system was located near the boundary between the Australian region and the South Fiji basin, characterized by favorable upper-level outflow and warm sea surface temperatures. Later that day, the Fiji Meteorological Service assumed primary responsibility for the system as it crossed into their Area of Responsibility.

The Fiji Meteorological Service officially designated the system as Tropical Depression 06F. During its peak intensity, with estimated 1-minute sustained winds of 75 km/h (45 mph). Concurrently, recorded a minimum barometric pressure of 994 hPa (29.35 inHg).

By early January 22, increasing vertical wind shear from the northwest began to decouple the system's low-level circulation from its deep convection. This hostile environment caused the depression to rapidly lose organization. On January 22, the FMS issued its final advisory, noting that 06F had degenerated into a post-tropical remnant low. However, the JTWC instead classified it as a subtropical depression and continued to track it until the 25th.

=== Tropical Depression 07F ===
- Tropical depression (Australian scale)
- Tropical storm (SSHWS)
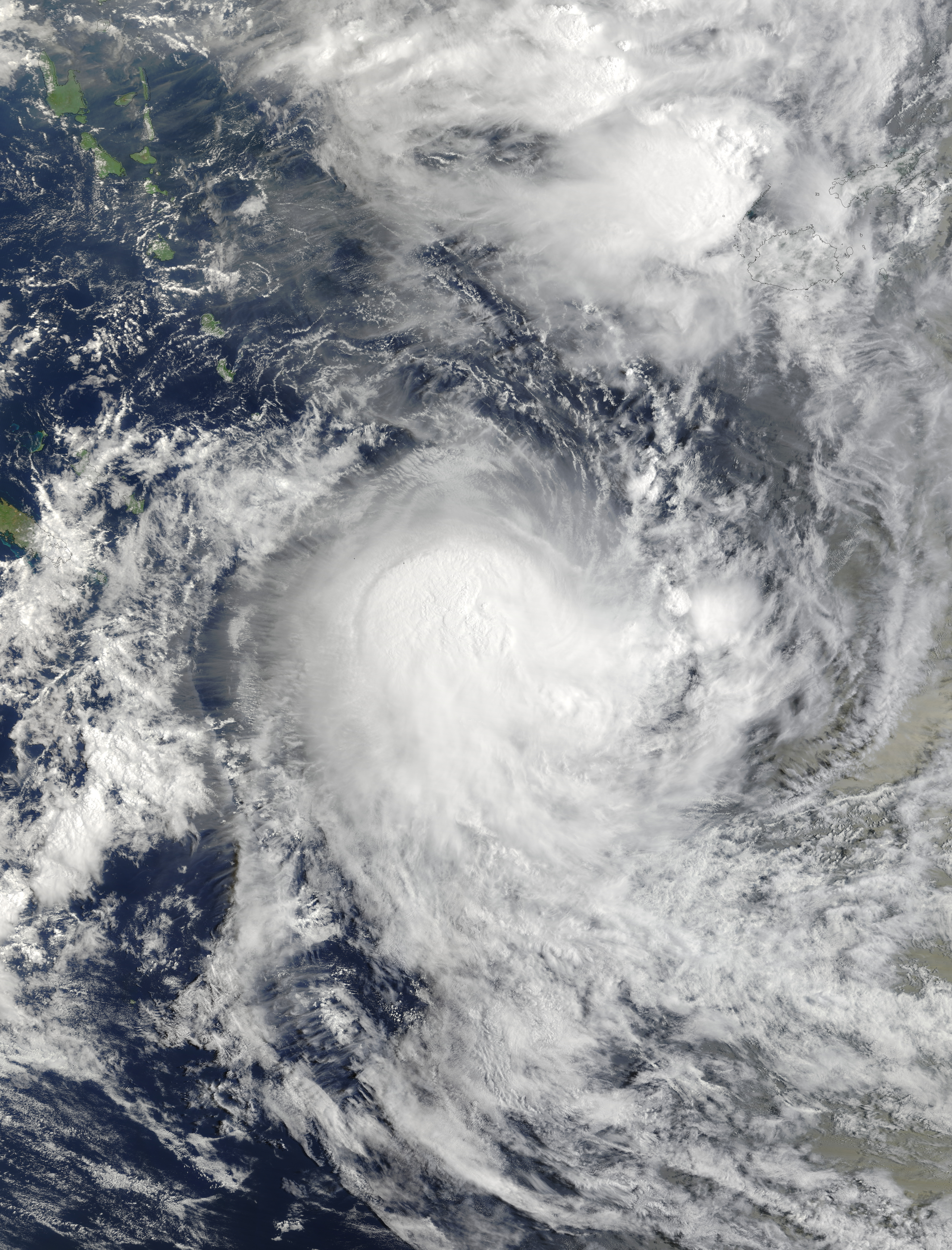
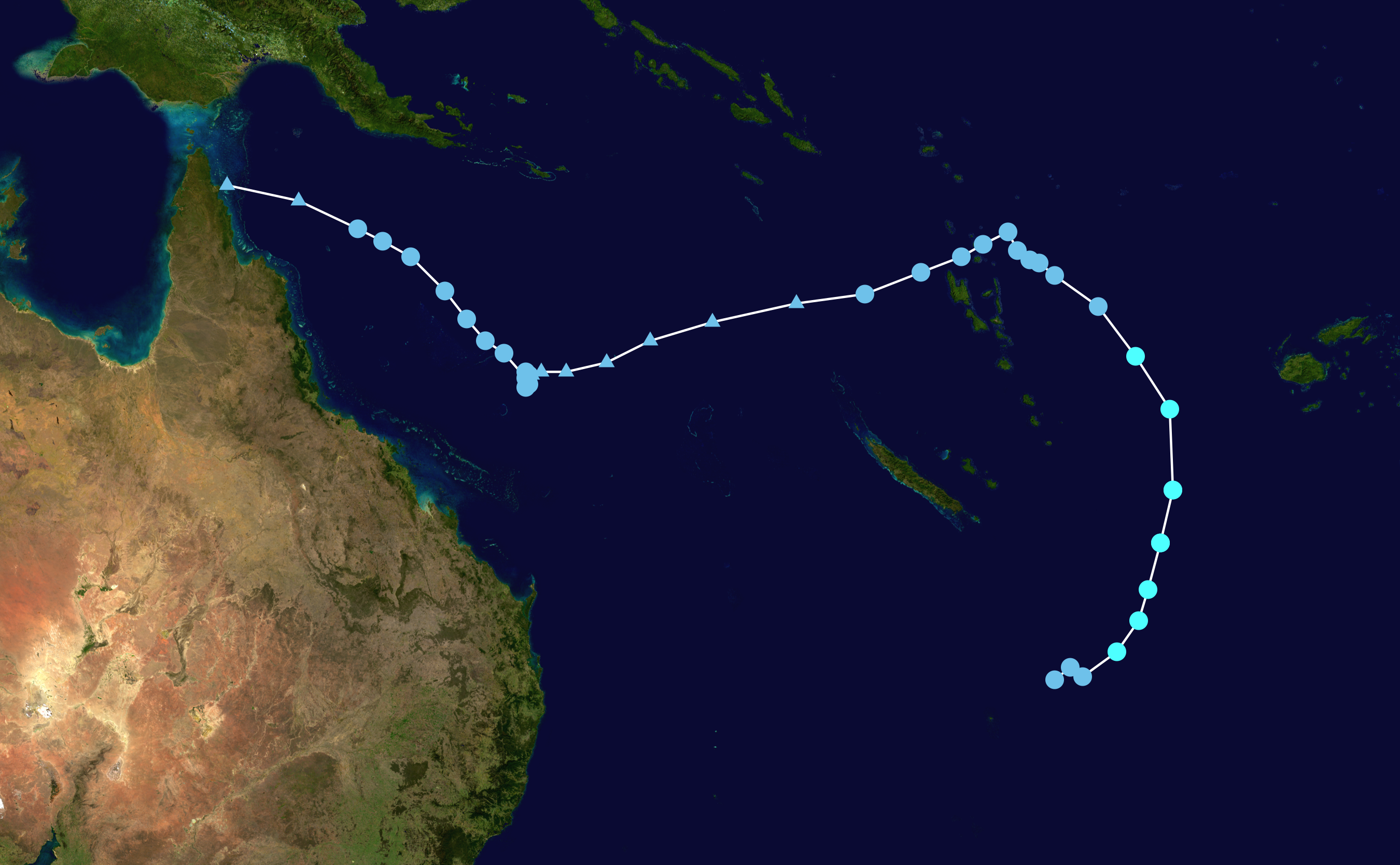
- Duration: 27 January (Entered basin) – 29 January
- Peak intensity: 55 km/h (35 mph) (10-min); 998 hPa (mbar)

The remnants of Tropical Low 17U from the Australian Region entered the South Pacific basin on 27 January. The system was classified as Tropical Disturbance 07F by the Fiji Meteorological Service, and began strengthening shortly after its crossover, becoming a tropical depression. On 28 January, the Joint Typhoon Warning Center initiated advisories on the system, designating it 18P. The cyclone began rapidly organizing as it dove southward, and the JTWC estimated it had a peak intensity of 65 mph (105 km/h), and a minimum pressure of 988 milibars early on 29 January. After the fact, the cyclone begun to move over cooler waters, and promptly began its extratropical transition. The system was last noted on 30 January, just to the northeast of Norfolk Island.

=== Tropical Cyclone Urmil ===
- Category 2 tropical cyclone (Australian scale)
- Category 1 tropical cyclone (SSHWS)
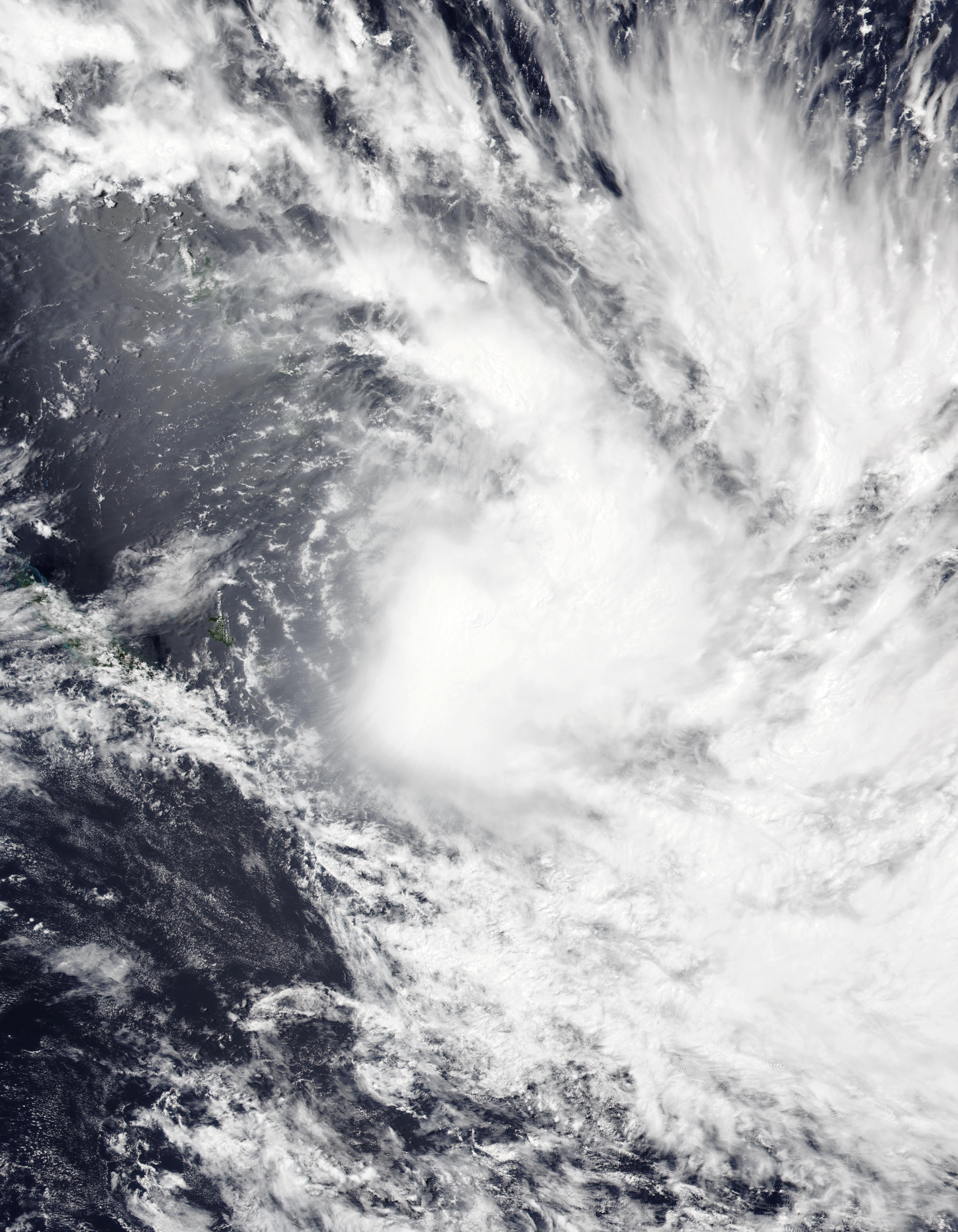
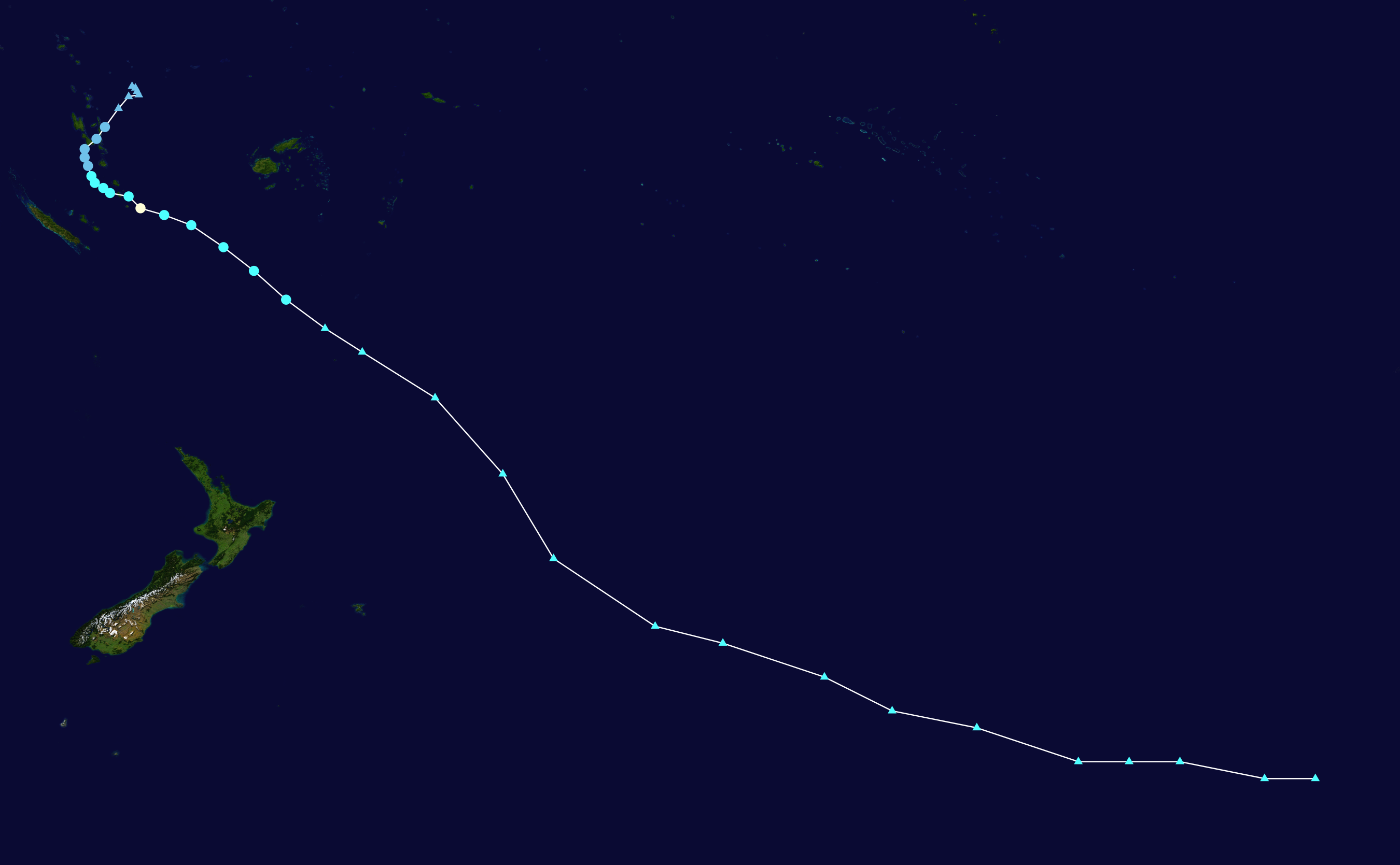
- Duration: 25 February – 1 March
- Peak intensity: 100 km/h (65 mph) (10-min); 980 hPa (mbar)

On 23 February, the FMS began to forecast a low pressure system developing near Vanuatu in the next 5 days. Late on the next day, both the FMS and JTWC reported that a tropical low had formed approximately 219 nautical miles (406 km) to the north-northeast of Port Vila. At the time, it had fragmented convection developing over the southeast of a tightening low-level trough, and was under a favorable environment with low wind shear, warm sea surface temperatures and good poleward outflow aloft. Over the next few days, it continued to organize, with improved convective banding, leading to the FMS designating the low as Tropical Disturbance 09F and prompting the JTWC to issue a TCFA early on 26 February. Around 12:00 UTC on the same day, the FMS further upgraded 09F into a tropical depression, with the JTWC issuing advisories on the system late on the same day, designating the system as Tropical Cyclone 23P. By 27 February, the FMS reported that it had intensified into a Category 1 tropical cyclone in the Australian scale, and named the system as Urmil. It set the record for the latest first named tropical cyclone during a season in the South Pacific, beating the former record set by Tropical Cyclone Bart in 2017 which was named on 21 February.

During 27 February, Urmil continued to gradually intensify, with the FMS reporting that it had intensified into a Category 2 tropical cyclone late on the same day. The JTWC subsequently upgraded the system to a Category 1-equivalent tropical cyclone on the Saffir-Simpson scale by 28 February. Urmil then reached its peak intensity at 06:00 UTC that same day, with 10-minute winds of 55 kn (100 km/h; 65 mph). Afterwards, Urmil began to weaken under increasing wind shear and cooler sea surface temperatures, with deep convection becoming more disorganized. It then crossed into MetService's area of responsibility by the next day, with the JTWC issuing its final advisory on the system shortly after, as it was transitioning to a subtropical system. The MetService subsequently reclassified Urmil as an ex-tropical cyclone, and continued to track the system until 5 March, when it had moved out of its area of responsibility.

Outer rainbands and strong winds associated with Urmil impacted Fiji. A child drowned in Namoli at Kaleli Settlement.

=== Tropical Depression 10F ===
- Tropical depression (Australian scale)
- Tropical storm (SSHWS)
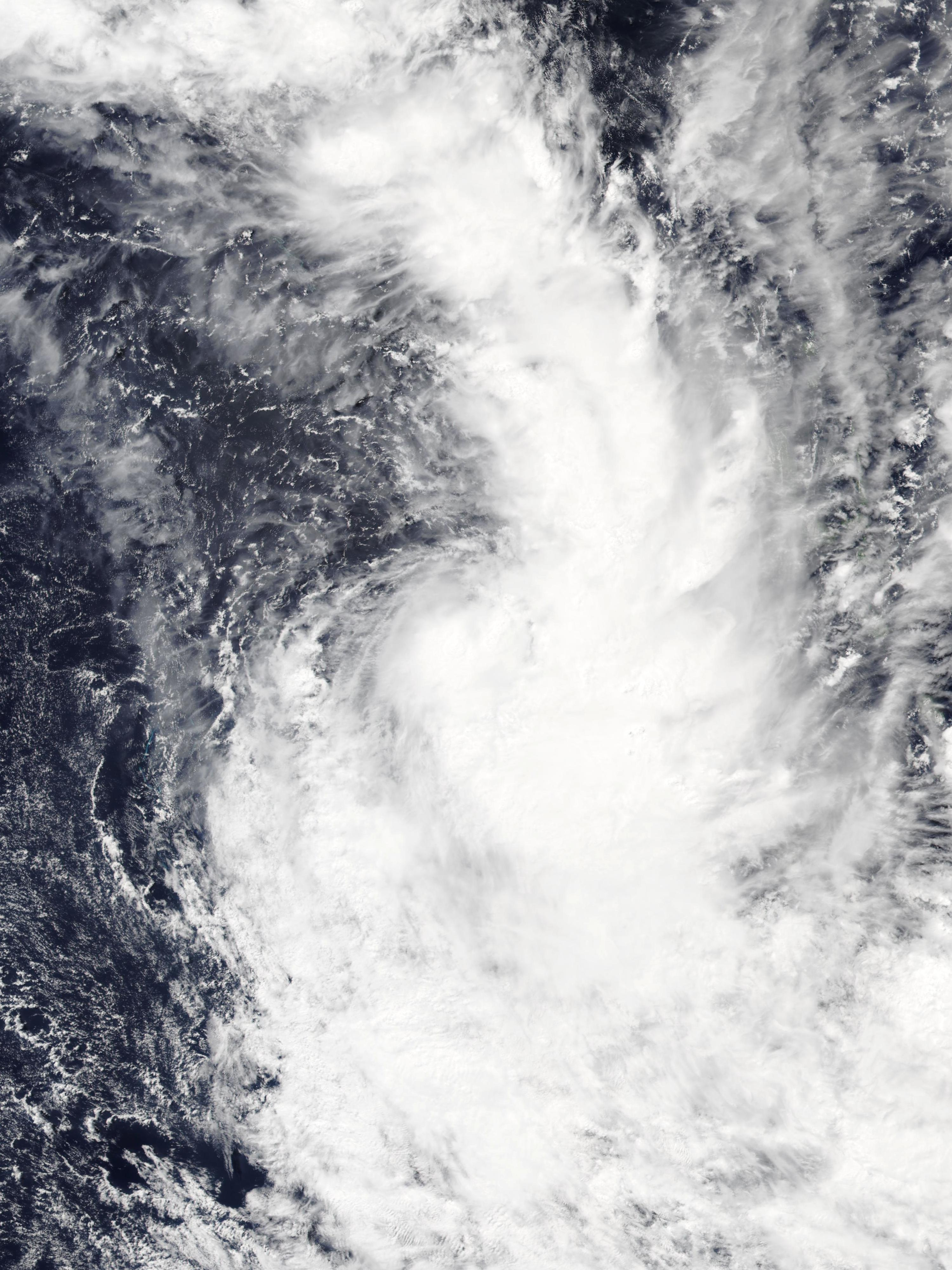
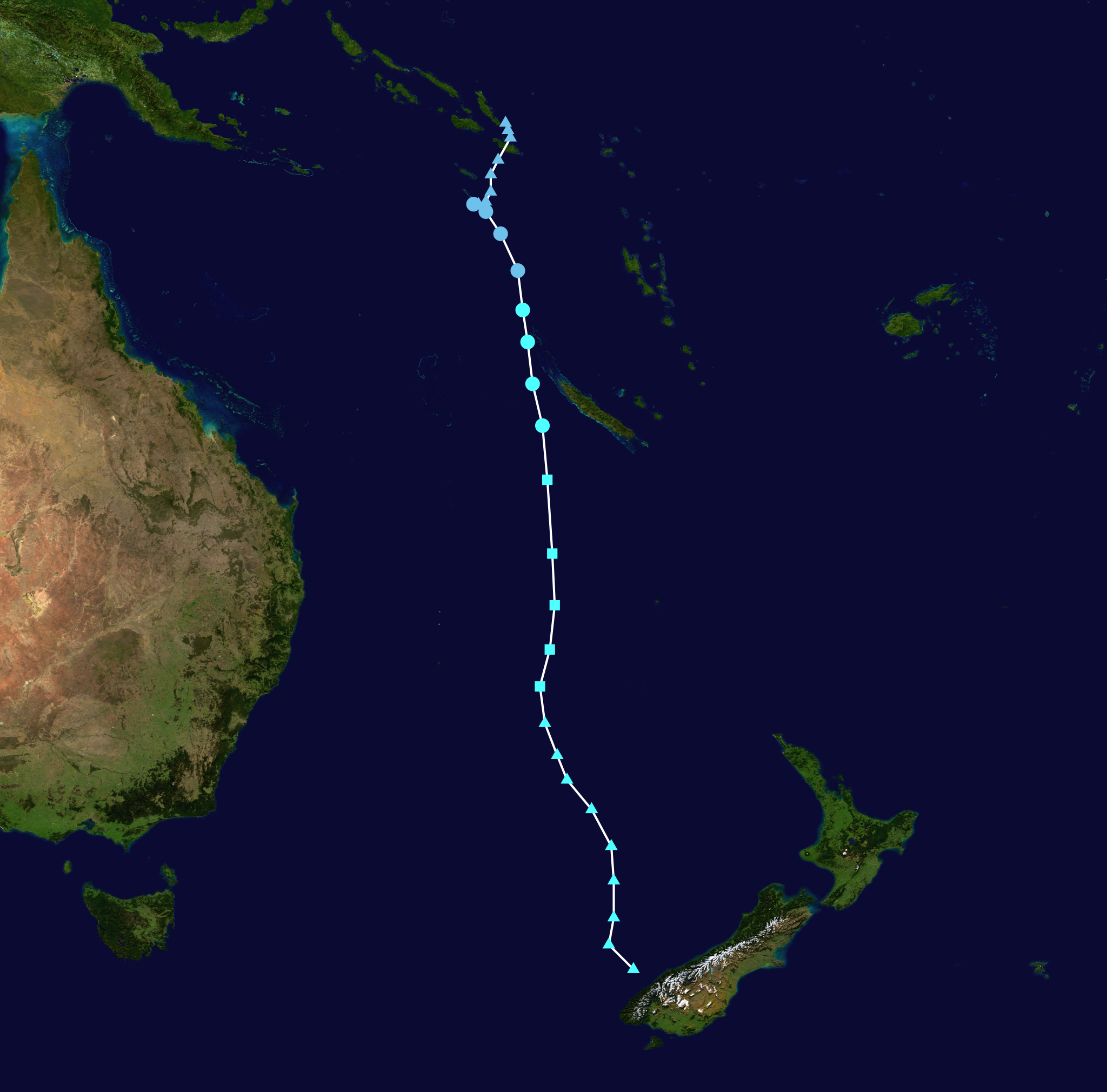
- Duration: 21 March – 24 March
- Peak intensity: 55 km/h (35 mph) (10-min); 994 hPa (mbar)

On 21 March at 21:00 UTC, the Fiji Meteorological Service (FMS) designated Tropical Disturbance 10F and stated that the potential for a tropical cyclone is low in the next 48 hours. 10F was located in a favourable environment with low wind shear and good poleward outflow. On 22 March at 02:30 UTC, the Joint Typhoon Warning Center (JTWC) issued a Tropical Cyclone Formation Alert, citing that there is convective banding developing around the low-level circulation, while the system was located south of Honiara, Solomon Islands. The storm encountered warm sea surface temperatures of 28–29°C and strong poleward outflow. On 23 March at 03:00 UTC, the JTWC designated Tropical Cyclone 28P based on a 22 March 22:51 UTC ASCAT-C pass revealing winds of 35 mph-40 mph (55 km/h-65 km/h) in the eastern quadrant. Later that day at 20:00 UTC, the FMS increased the winds to 45 kt (85 km/h) and the pressure to 995 mb (29.38 inHg). On 24 March at 03:00 UTC, the JTWC issued its final warning as the system headed into the baroclinic zone and cooler sea surface temperatures of 24°C. Even though the JTWC stopped issuing warnings, they kept tracking it as a Subtropical Storm until the 26th, where it finally became an extratropical cyclone.

=== Severe Tropical Cyclone Vaianu ===
- Category 3 severe tropical cyclone (Australian scale)
- Category 3 tropical cyclone (SSHWS)
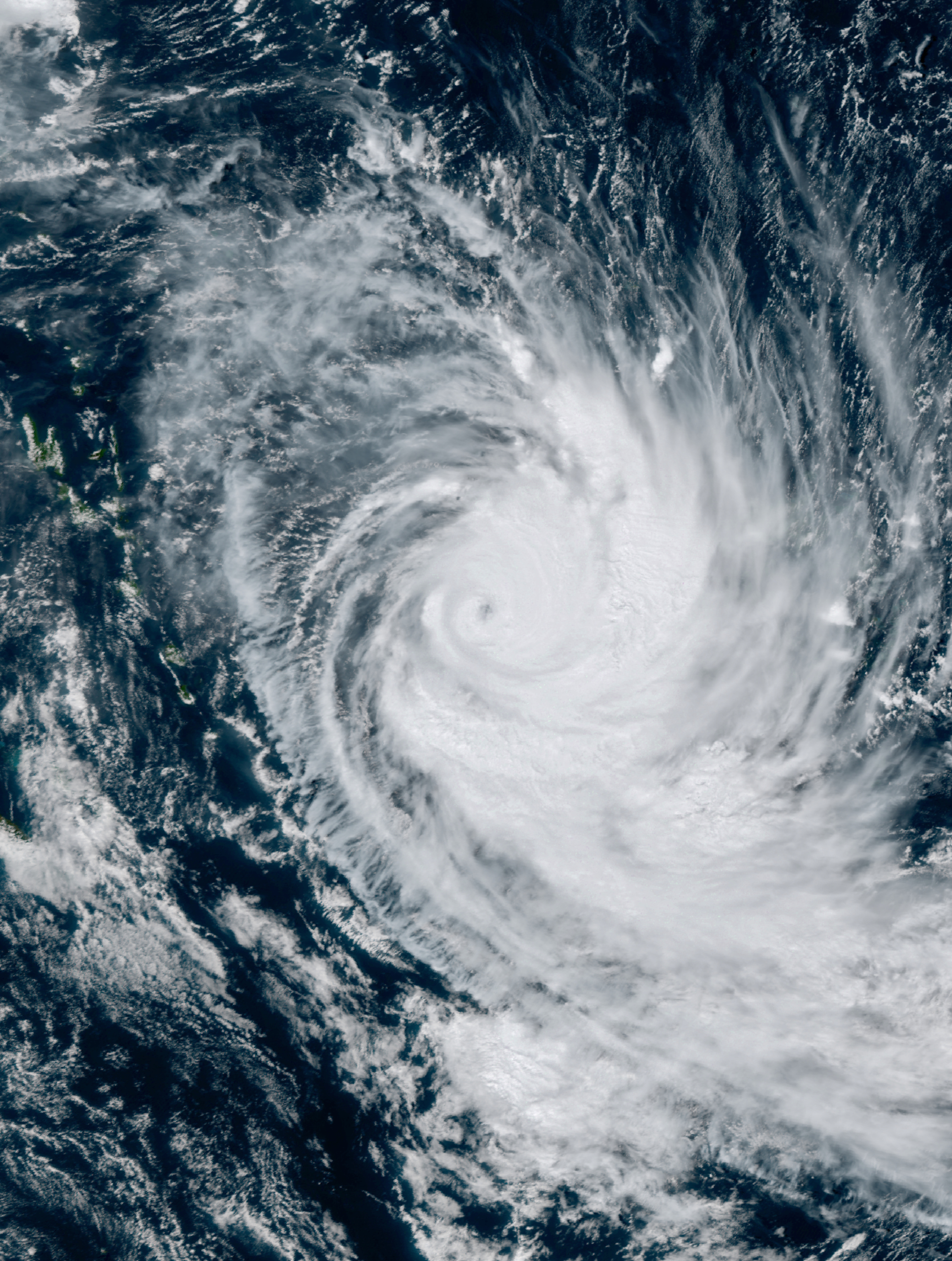
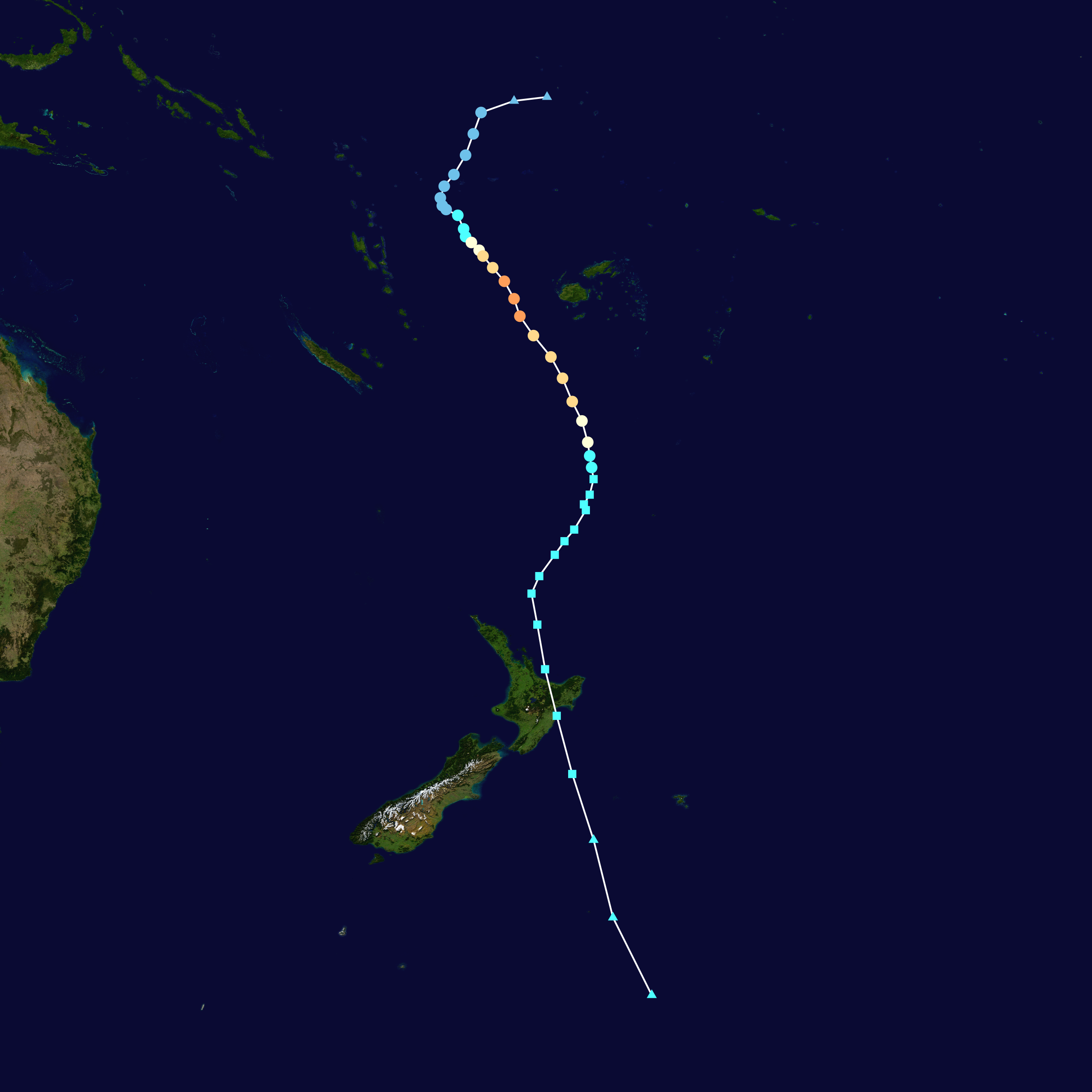
- Duration: 3 April – 8 April
- Peak intensity: 155 km/h (100 mph) (10-min); 945 hPa (mbar)

On 3 April, the Fiji Meteorological Service began monitoring a tropical disturbance, located approximately 500 km west-southwest of Tuvalu, assigning it the designation 11F. The Joint Typhoon Warning Center (JTWC) had dubbed this system Invest 91P a day prior. On 4 April at 11:30 UTC, the JTWC issued a Tropical Cyclone Formation Alert, citing a broad low-level circulation center with ASCATs supporting up to 35 kt (65 km/h) in the southeastern quadrant. The JTWC also described favorable conditions for the storm with low to moderate vertical wind shear and warm sea surface temperatures of 29–30°C. Later that night, the FMS upgraded 11F to a tropical depression. On 5 April at 03:00 UTC, the JTWC designated 11F as Tropical Storm 31P with 1-minute sustained winds of 40 kt (75 km/h). Later that evening, the FMS upgraded 11F to a Category 1 cyclone on the Australian scale, giving the name Vaianu. On 5 April at 18:00 UTC, the FMS upgraded Vaianu to a Category 2 cyclone with 10-minute sustained winds of 55 kt (100 km/h) and a pressure of 975 mb (28.79 inHg). On 6 April at 07:40 UTC, the FMS further upgraded Vaianu to a severe tropical cyclone, the first in the basin since Cyclone Mal in November 2023. On 7 April at 00:00 UTC, the JTWC upgraded Vaianu to a Category 3 on the SSHWS with 1-minute sustained winds of 100 kt (185 km/h). Vaianu is the first major cyclone on the SSHWS to form in the South Pacific basin since Cyclone Lola in October 2023. After achieving peak intensity, increasing wind shear, dry air, and cooler sea surface temperatures have contributed to weakening the storm. The JTWC downgraded Vaianu to a Category 1 on the SSHWS by 8 April at 06:00 UTC. The Tonga Meteorological Service had issued strong wind, heavy rain, and gale warnings for Tongatapu and ʻEua due to Cyclone Vaianu. On 9 April at 09:00 UTC, the JTWC issued a final warning for Cyclone Vaianu, citing that the storm is in an unfavorable environment with high wind shear of 30 kt (55 km/h). Vaianu had 1-minute sustained winds of 55 kt (100 km/h) and a hybrid structure of a partially exposed center and little central convection. On 11 April at 03:00 UTC, New Zealand MetService noted Vaianu had made landfall in Rotorua with the JTWC noting Vaianu as a subtropical storm during this time with 1-minute sustained winds of 35 kt (65 km/h).

On 8 April, the New Zealand MetService issued a preliminary severe weather watch for the entire North Island in anticipation of Cyclone Vaianu's arrival on 12 April. New Zealand Prime Minister Christopher Luxon confirmed that government agencies were on "full notice" over the approaching weather system. On 9 April, Earth Sciences New Zealand forecast that some areas could experience 200mm of rain within 18–24 hours of Cyclone Vaianu reaching the North Island.

On 10 April, a precautionary state of emergency was declared in New Zealand's Northland Region in response to the approaching Cyclone Vaianu. The following day, local states of emergency were declared in the Whakatāne District, Hawke's Bay, Waikato and several districts in the Bay of Plenty in response to the approaching cyclone, which was expected to make landfall that night. Residents of properties along Ōhope's West End were also ordered to evacuate by 5pm due to the risk of landslides and other severe weather events.

On 12 April, Cyclone Vaianu made landfall in the North Island, moving through the Bay of Plenty towards Hawke's Bay. The cyclone caused strong winds and waves, and significant power outages in Northland, Tauranga, the Coromandel Peninsula and the Auckland Region. The entire North Island was placed under various rain and wind watches and warnings. On 13 April the cyclone departed the North Island and headed southeast towards the Chatham Islands. That same day, states of emergency were lifted in most affected regions and districts except Whakatāne.

The Ministry of Agriculture in Fiji conducted a disaster assessment and determined that Vaianu caused US$1.5 million in damages, impacting nearly 14,000 agricultural households nationwide.

=== Other systems ===
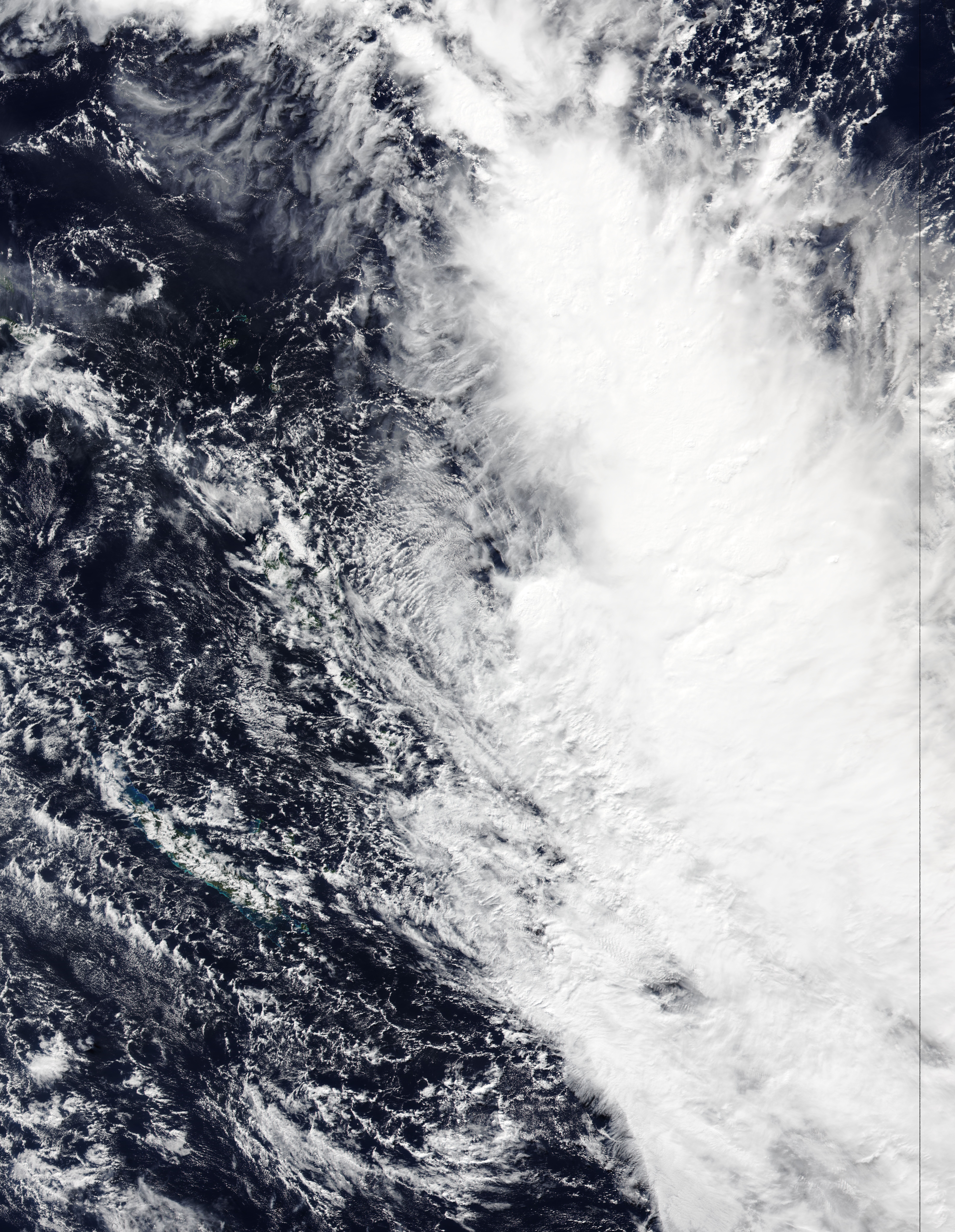
The subtropical storm as seen early on 15 June

On 2 December, the FMS marked that a Tropical Disturbance formed near Tahiti, numbering it 01F, the JTWC marked it as a subtropical storm, and on 4 December, it dissipated due to harsh conditions.

On 28 December, a low pressure area near the coast of Samoa was marked as Tropical Disturbance 04F, it was marked as a subtropical depression until it dissipated on 1 January due to harsh conditions.

On 30 January, the FMS began monitoring a low pressure area southeast of Fiji, later designating it as Tropical Disturbance 08F. As a short-lived tropical cyclone, the system quickly moved northbound, and dissipated by 31 January.

On 14 June, the JTWC began tracking a poorly-defined subtropical storm located east of Vanuatu, labeling it 96P as it was given a LOW chance for transitioning into a tropical cyclone. The next day, the storm's environment became greatly unfavorable as high vertical wind shear and dry air entrainment continued to elongate the low-level circulation, it reached peak maximum sustained winds of 40 kt (45 mph), and a minimum central pressure of 1000 mb (29.53 inHg) shortly after. On 16 June, the JTWC assessed the subtropical storm to have transitioned into a cold-core extratropical low as a result of its hostile environment as advisories were ceased.

== Storm names ==
Within the South Pacific, a tropical depression is judged to have reached tropical cyclone intensity should it reach winds of 65 km/h (40 mph) and it is evident that gales are occurring at least halfway around the centre. Tropical depressions intensifying into a tropical cyclone between the Equator and 26°S and between 160°E–120°W are named by the Fiji Meteorological Service (FMS); should a tropical depression intensify to the south of 26°S between 160°E and 120°W, it will be named in conjunction with the FMS by MetService. No names were used for the first time. Should a tropical cyclone move out of the basin and into the Australian region, it will retain its original name. The names that were used during the 2025–26 season are listed below:

- Urmil
- Vaianu

=== Retirement ===
After the season, the name Vaianu was retired. Vaianu was replaced with Velma.

== Season effects ==
This table lists all the storms that developed in the South Pacific to the east of longitude 160°E during the 2025–26 season. It includes their intensity on the Australian tropical cyclone intensity scale, duration, name, landfalls, deaths, and damages. All data is taken from RSMC Nadi and/or TCWC Wellington, and all of the damage figures are in 2025 or 2026 USD.

2025–26 South Pacific cyclone season
Name	Dates	Peak intensity			Areas affected	Damage (US$)	Deaths
Name	Dates	Category	Wind speed (km/h (mph))	Pressure (hPa)	Areas affected	Damage (US$)	Deaths
01F	2–4 Dec	Tropical disturbance	45 (30)	999	French Polynesia	None	0
02F	5–6 Dec	Tropical depression	55 (35)	1000	French Polynesia	None	0
03F	10–14 Dec	Tropical depression	55 (35)	1000	Solomon Islands, Vanuatu, Fiji	Unknown	0
04F	28 Dec – 1 Jan	Tropical disturbance	45 (30)	1001	American Samoa, Samoa	Unknown	0
05F	19–20 Jan	Tropical disturbance	45 (30)	994	Solomon Islands, Vanuatu, New Caledonia, Norfolk Island, New Zealand	45.3 million	10
06F	21–22 Jan	Tropical depression	55 (35)	998	New Caledonia	Unknown	0
07F	27–29 Jan	Tropical depression	55 (35)	998	Solomon Islands, Vanuatu, Fiji, Norfolk Island, New Zealand	Unknown	0
08F	30–31 Jan	Tropical disturbance	45 (30)	1000	American Samoa, Samoa, Niue, Tonga	Unknown	0
Urmil	26 Feb – 1 Mar	Category 2 tropical cyclone	100 (65)	980	Vanuatu, New Caledonia, Fiji, Tonga, Kermadec Islands	Unknown	1
10F	21–24 Mar	Tropical depression	55 (35)	994	Solomon Islands, New Caledonia, New Zealand	Unknown	0
Vaianu	3–8 Apr	Category 3 severe tropical cyclone	155 (100)	945	Tonga, Fiji, New Zealand	1.5 million	0
Season aggregates
11 systems	2 Dec – 9 Apr		155 (100)	945		46.8 million	11

== See also ==
- Weather of 2025 and 2026
- List of Southern Hemisphere cyclone seasons
- Tropical cyclones in 2025 and 2026
- Atlantic hurricane seasons: 2025, 2026
- Pacific hurricane seasons: 2025, 2026
- Pacific typhoon seasons: 2025, 2026
- North Indian Ocean cyclone seasons: 2025, 2026
- 2025–26 South-West Indian Ocean cyclone season
- 2025–26 Australian region cyclone season
