= Cyclone Vaianu =

Category 3 South Pacific severe tropical cyclone in 2026

Severe Tropical Cyclone Vaianu
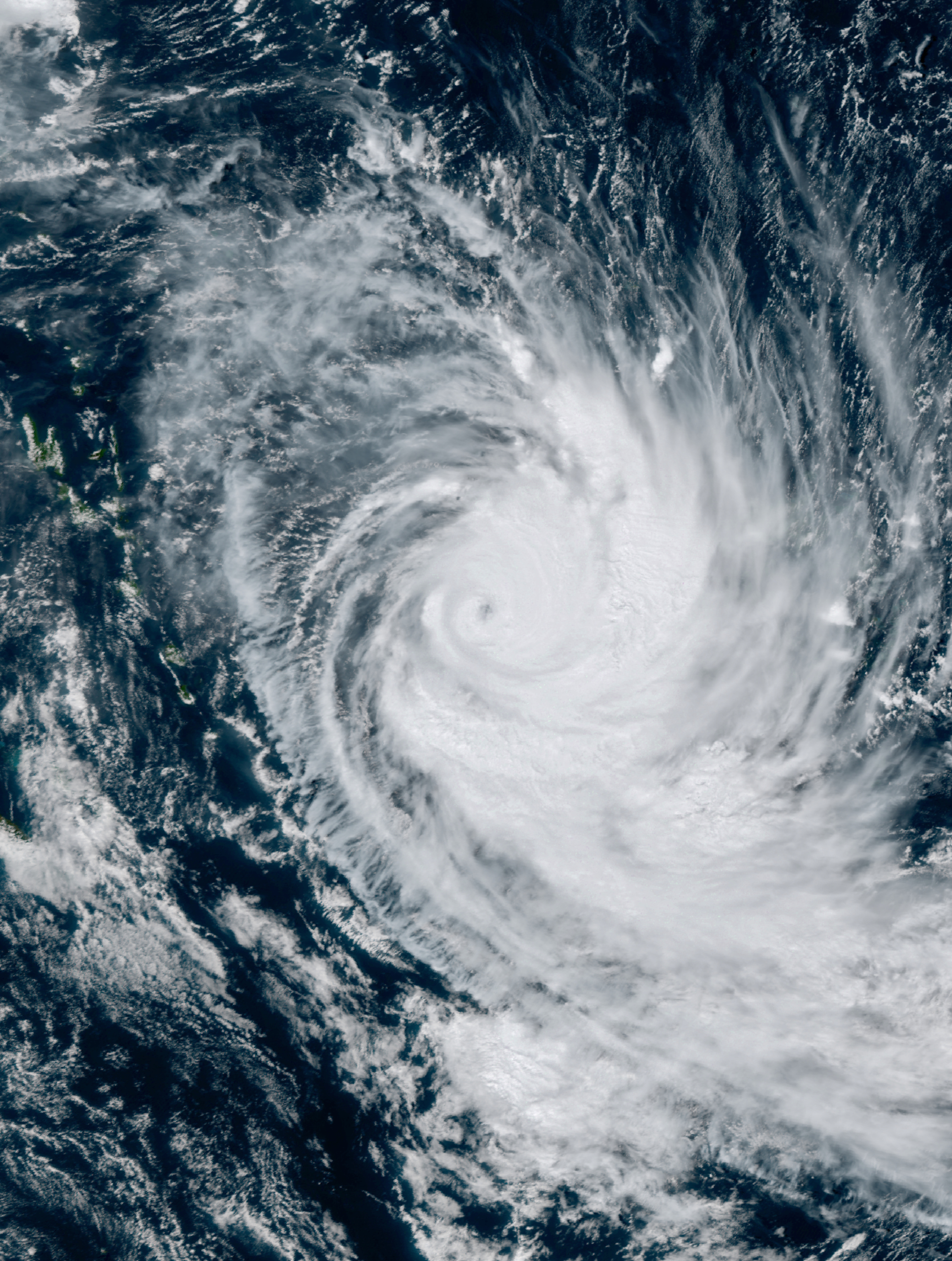
- Vaianu at its peak intensity while approaching Fiji on 6 April (UTC; 7 April, local time)

Meteorological history
- Formed: 3 April 2026
- Subtropical: 9 April 2026
- Dissipated: 12 April 2026

Category 3 severe tropical cyclone
- 10-minute sustained (FMS)
- Highest winds: 155 km/h (100 mph)
- Lowest pressure: 945 hPa (mbar); 27.91 inHg

Category 3-equivalent tropical cyclone
- 1-minute sustained (SSHWS/JTWC)
- Highest winds: 185 km/h (115 mph)
- Lowest pressure: 954 hPa (mbar); 28.17 inHg

Overall effects
- Fatalities: None
- Damage: >$1.5 million (2026 USD)
- Areas affected: Fiji; New Zealand
- Part of the 2025–26 South Pacific cyclone season

Severe Tropical Cyclone Vaianu was a strong tropical cyclone in the South Pacific that threatened and then struck the North Island of New Zealand. The second named cyclone and first severe tropical cyclone of the 2025–26 South Pacific cyclone season, Vaianu formed from a tropical disturbance west-southwest of Tuvalu on 3 April, and was initially designated as 11F. The disturbance strengthened to a full-fledged tropical cyclone two days later on 5 April, gaining the name Vaianu; at 03:00 UTC of the same day, the JTWC designated the cyclone as 31P. Further strengthening ensued the following day, with the system being upgraded to a severe tropical cyclone by the Fiji Meteorological Service (FMS).

== Meteorological history ==
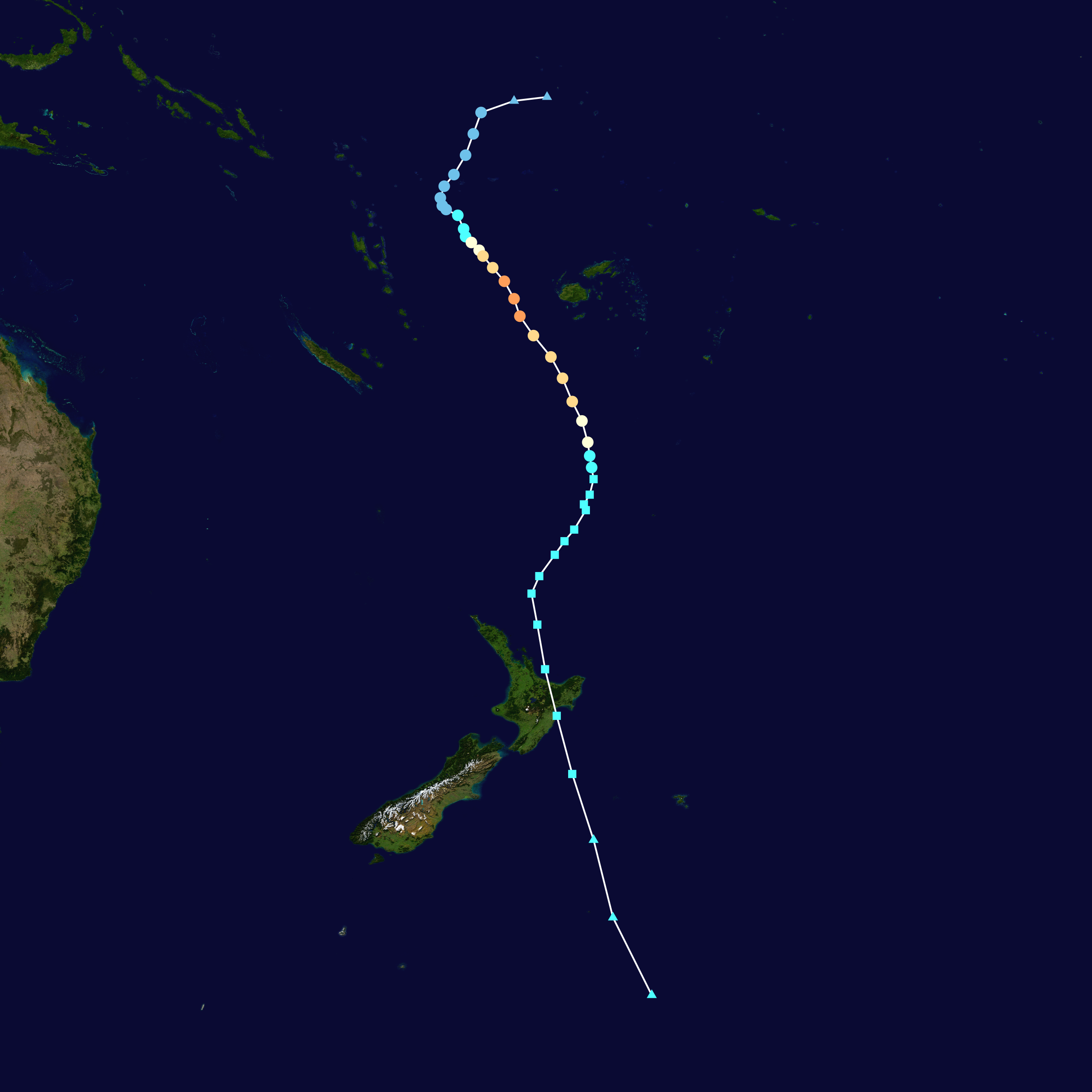
Map plotting the storm's track and intensity, according to the Saffir–Simpson scale Map key Saffir–Simpson scale Tropical depression (≤38 mph, ≤62 km/h) Tropical storm (39–73 mph, 63–118 km/h) Category 1 (74–95 mph, 119–153 km/h) Category 2 (96–110 mph, 154–177 km/h) Category 3 (111–129 mph, 178–208 km/h) Category 4 (130–156 mph, 209–251 km/h) Category 5 (≥157 mph, ≥252 km/h) Unknown Storm type Tropical cyclone Subtropical cyclone Extratropical cyclone, remnant low, tropical disturbance, or monsoon depression

On 3 April, the Fiji Meteorological Service (FMS) reported that Tropical Disturbance 11F had developed about 735 km (455 mi) to the north-northeast of Port Vila, Vanuatu. At this stage, atmospheric convection was displaced to the southeast of the low-level circulation centre, while multiple mesovortices were identifiable on satellite imagery. The system itself was located within a marginal environment for further development, with low vertical wind shear and warm sea-surface temperatures, while dry air and stronger vertical wind shear were present to its south-southwest.

Over the next day, the disturbance's low-level circulation centre slowly consolidated and atmospheric convection developed over the eastern part of the circulation as it gradually moved southwards along the subtropical ridge of high pressure. As a result, the United States Joint Typhoon Warning Center issued a Tropical Cyclone Formation Alert, which meant that there was a high probability of tropical cyclogenesis over the next day. Later that night, the FMS upgraded 11F to a tropical depression.

On 5 April at 03:00 UTC, the JTWC designated 11F as Tropical Cyclone 31P with 1-minute sustained winds of 40 kt (75 km/h). Later that evening, the FMS upgraded 11F to a Category 1 cyclone on the Australian scale, giving the name Vaianu. On 5 April at 18:00 UTC, the FMS upgraded Vaianu to a Category 2 cyclone with 10-minute sustained winds of 55 kt (100 km/h) and a pressure of 975 mb (28.79 inHg). On 6 April at 07:40 UTC, the FMS further upgraded Vaianu to a severe tropical cyclone, the first in the basin since Cyclone Mal in November 2023. On 7 April at 00:00 UTC, the JTWC upgraded Vaianu to a Category 3 on the SSHWS with 1-minute sustained winds of 100 kt (185 km/h). which was the first major cyclone (JTWC) in the basin since Cyclone Lola in 2023.

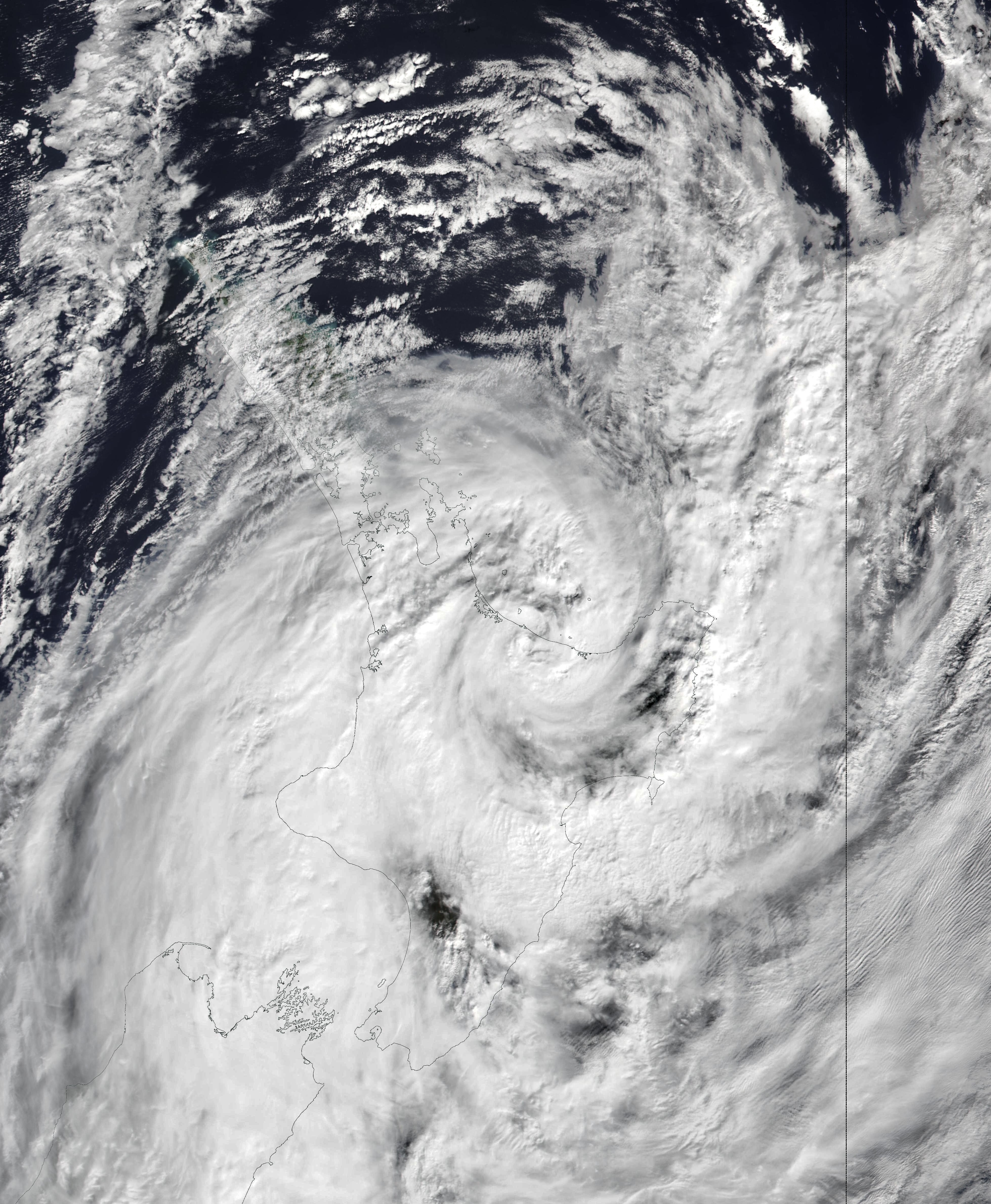
Vaianu as a subtropical storm making landfall in North Island

After achieving peak intensity, increasing wind shear, dry air, and significantly cooler sea surface temperatures (18-21°c) had contributed to weakening the storm. The JTWC downgraded Vaianu to a Category 1 on the SSHWS by 8 April at 06:00 UTC. The Tonga Meteorological Service had issued strong wind, heavy rain, and gale warnings for Tongatapu and ʻEua due to Cyclone Vaianu. On 9 April at 09:00 UTC, the JTWC issued a final warning for Cyclone Vaianu, citing that the storm is in an unfavourable environment with high wind shear of 30 kt (55 km/h). Vaianu had 1-minute sustained winds of 55 kt (100 km/h) and a hybrid structure matching a subtropical storm with a partially exposed center and little central convection. On 11 April at 03:00 UTC, New Zealand MetService noted Vaianu had made landfall in Rotorua with the JTWC noting Vaianu as a subtropical storm during this time with 1-minute sustained winds of 35 kt (65 km/h). On April 12th, the system dissipated after exiting New Zealand.

== Preparations ==
=== New Zealand ===
On 8 April, the New Zealand MetService issued a preliminary severe weather watch for the entire North Island in anticipation of Cyclone Vaianu's arrival on 12 April. New Zealand Prime Minister Christopher Luxon confirmed that government agencies were on "full notice" over the approaching weather system. On 9 April, Earth Sciences New Zealand forecast that some areas could experience 200mm of rain within 18–24 hours of Cyclone Vaianu reaching the North Island. In the days leading up to the cyclone's arrival, the shelves of several of several products in upper North Island supermarkets were emptied as a result of panic buying.

On 10 April a precautionary state of emergency was declared in the Northland Region. The next day local states of emergency were declared in the Whakatāne District, Hawke's Bay, Waikato, Tauranga and several districts in the Bay of Plenty. Residents of properties along Ōhope's West End were ordered to evacuate by 5pm due to the risk of landslides and other severe weather events. In the afternoon, Emergency Mobile Alerts were sent to smart phones in Auckland and Northland with information for how to prepare for the cyclone. The Hastings District Council asked residents to evacuate flood-prone areas. In total, about 500 homes in Cape Coast and the central Hawke's Bay were asked to evacuate by 5pm on 11 April. Fifty families in the Northland Region chose to evacuate to maraes and emergency shelters prior to the cyclone's arrival. In the coastal Whakatane District, with residents of 270 properties ordered to evacuate. The entire North Island was placed under various rain and wind watches and warnings. The Auckland Transport Operations Centre also advised Auckland residents to delay all unnecessary travel on 12 April due to the cyclone making landfall. Auckland's ferry services were also cancelled as a precautionary safety measure. While all weather watches and warnings in the Bay of Plenty were lifted by 13 April, MetService issued a heavy rain watch for northern Taranaki, Waitomo, Taumarunui, and the area west of Lake Taupō. By the night of 13 April, states of emergency had been lifted in Northland, Waikato, Coromandel Peninsula, Western Bay of Plenty and Gisborne; with only Whakatāne remaining under a state of emergency.

While most mayors in the Hawke's Bay region declared states of emergency in response to Cyclone Vaianu, Mayor of Wairoa Craig Little declined to declare one, stating that "we're becoming woke as a country when it comes to states of emergency" and that people "were panicking over not too much." In response, New Zealand Prime Minister Christopher Luxon expressed disagreement with Little's response on 13 April, stating "I'll happily wear a woke label this time if it means we didn't lose anyone's lives." Luxon also described Cyclone Vaianu as a "significant event" with 10 local states of emergency and said that several regions had experienced road closures, power outages and flooding.

== Impact ==
After a disaster assessment conducted by the Ministry of Agriculture in Fiji, it was determined that Vaianu caused US$1.5 million in damages, and had damaged nearly 14,000 agricultural households across the country.

On the night of 11 April, Vaianu made landfall in the Northland Region of New Zealand. The region escaped serious damage because the storm moved farther east than initially predicted. During that period, the Whangarei CBD experienced over 130 mm (5.1 in) of rainfall over a 24-hour period while Cape Reinga recorded winds of 110 km/h (68 mph). A buoy in the Bay of Islands reported waves reaching 10.8 m (35 ft). Vaianu caused extensive power cuts, surface flooding and road closures throughout the east coast of the North Island. The Coromandel peninsula recorded 220 mm (8.7 in) of rain while Māhia reported of wind gusts of 126 km/h (78 mph). The cyclone produced strong winds and waves, and significant power outages in Northland, Tauranga, the Coromandel Peninsula and the Auckland Region. Despite initial forecasts, Cyclone Vaianu did not cause inundation at high tide at 1pm on 12 April. The cyclone led to the closure of two highways in the Hawke's Bay region by 4:30 pm including State Highway 2 between Wairoa and Gisborne and State Highway 50 Breakwater Road between Hardinge Road and Coote Rd. Cyclone Vaianu also caused fallen trees and road closures through the Hawke's Bay region. A Civil Defence Centre was established at a church in Waipawa while several marae in Poukawa, Waipawa and Pōrangahau served as community hubs for evacuated residents. By 2pm, Air New Zealand had cancelled over 90 turboprop services in the Hawke's Bay region including Tauranga, Rotorua, Gisborne and Napier. According to the lines company Unison, 583 customers lost power in Napier and Hastings, 137 in the Central Hawke's Bay, and 128 homes in Te Onepu, Te Hauke and Poukawa due to storm damage. In the coastal Whakatane District, Fire and Emergency New Zealand confirmed it had responded to 100 calls relating to wind damage and surface flooding. As of noon on 13 April, 3,000 homes in the central North Island had no power due to storm damage.

== See also ==
- Weather of 2026
- Tropical cyclones in 2026
