= 2025–26 European windstorm season =

2025–2026 European windstorm season
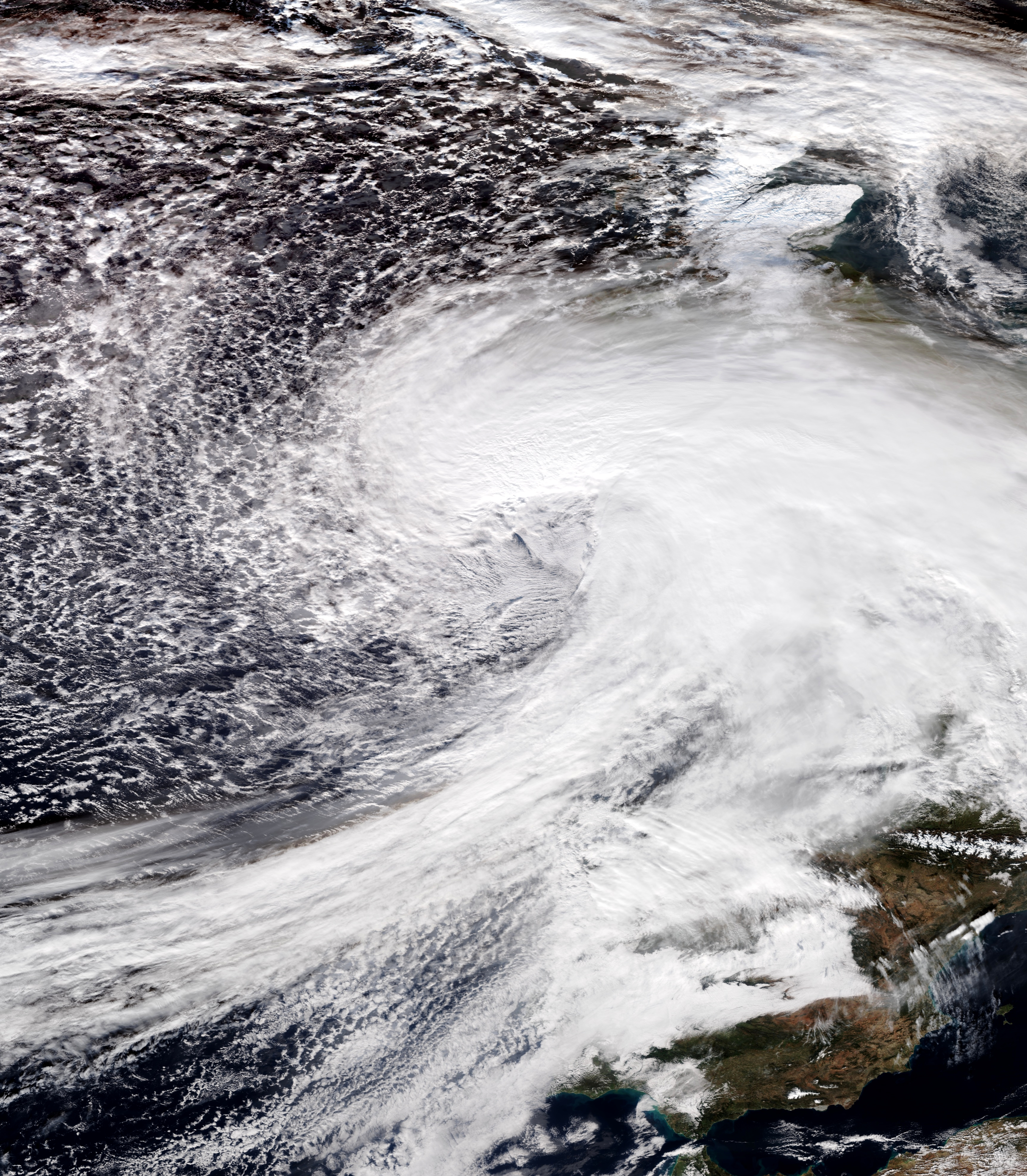
- Storm Goretti, one of the most impactful storms of the season
- First storm formed: 22 September 2025
- Last storm dissipated: 24 August 2026
- Strongest storm^{1}: Storm Joseph 939 hPa (27.73 inHg)
- Strongest wind gust: Storm Amy 139 mph (224 km/h; 62 m/s; 121 kn) at Folgefonna, Norway
- Total storms: 41 (1)
- Total fatalities: 489+
- ^{1}Strongest storm is determined by lowest pressure and maximum recorded non-mountainous wind gust is also included for reference.

The 2025–26 European windstorm season was the eleventh year of the continent's coordinated severe weather naming programme. While the official list of names was unveiled on 1 September 2025, the season's duration typically spans from the start of September 2025 through to 31 August 2026, with the exception of the Eastern Mediterranean group, which the season begins on 1 October.

This year represented the seventh season of collaboration within the Western Group, where the Netherlands Koninklijk Nederlands Meteorologisch Instituut (KNMI) works alongside the UK's Met Office and Ireland's Met Éireann. To the south-west, the national meteorological agencies of Portugal, Spain, France, and Belgium have united for their ninth year of partnership, joined for the first time by Luxembourg.

The Mediterranean regions also entered their fifth year of formal naming. This included the Eastern Mediterranean group—comprising Greece, Israel, and Cyprus—and the Central Mediterranean group, which includes Italy, Slovenia, Croatia, Montenegro, North Macedonia, and Malta. Furthermore, a significant change occurred on 1 January 2026, when the Northern Group, Norway, Sweden and Denmark, adopted a predetermined list of names for the first time.

== Background and naming ==
=== Definitions and naming conventions ===
There is no universal definition of what constitutes a windstorm in Europe, nor is there a universal system of naming storms.

In the western group, consisting of the UK, Ireland, and the Netherlands, a storm is named if one of those meteorological agencies issues an orange warning (known as amber in the UK per its National Severe Weather Warning Service system), which generally requires a likelihood of widespread sustained wind speeds greater than 65 km/h (18 m/s; 35 kn; 40 mph), or widespread wind gust speeds over 110 km/h (31 m/s; 59 kn; 68 mph). Required speeds vary slightly by agency and by season. Likelihood of on-land human impacts and inherent severity of the system are further factors in whether to use the next pre-listed name.

The south-western group conducts its own naming (Spain, Portugal, and France). They typically name a storm if it prompts the issuance of an orange warning, usually for wind, rain or in some cases snow.

For Greece to call upon the next name of its group, the criteria are when forecast winds are above 50 km/h (14 m/s; 27 kn; 31 mph) over land plus expected to impact infrastructure significantly. For Denmark to do so, a windstorm must have an hourly average wind speed of at least 90 km/h (25 m/s; 49 kn; 56 mph).

The Meteorology Department of the Free University of Berlin (FUB) names all high and low-pressure systems that affect Europe, though they do not assign names to any actual storms. A windstorm that is associated with one of these pressure systems is sometimes recognized by the name given to the associated pressure system by the FUB. Named windstorms that have been recognized by a European meteorological agency are described in this article.

Invoking the next listed name in Europe is commonly by a storm's forecast conditions in the next day or so – as public awareness and preparedness are often cited as the main purpose. A nascent storm very occasionally does not become or remain a storm when reaching the forecasting authority.

=== Western group (United Kingdom, Ireland and the Netherlands) ===
These following names were chosen for this storm season by the western group.

- Amy
- Bram
- Chandra
- Dave
- Eddie (unused)
- Fionnuala (unused)
- Gerard (unused)
- Hannah (unused)
- Isla (unused)
- Janna (unused)
- Kasia (unused)
- Lilith (unused)
- Marty (unused)
- Nico (unused)
- Oscar (unused)
- Patrick (unused)
- Ruby (unused)
- Stevie (unused)
- Tadhg (unused)
- Violet (unused)
- Wubbo (unused)

=== South-western group (France, Spain, Portugal, Belgium, Luxembourg and Andorra) ===
These following names were chosen for this storm season by the south-western group.

- Alice
- Benjamin
- Claudia
- Davide
- Emilia
- Francis
- Goretti
- Harry
- Ingrid
- Joseph
- Kristin
- Leonardo
- Marta
- Nils
- Oriana
- Pedro
- Regina
- Samuel
- Therese
- Vitor (unused)
- Wilma (unused)

=== Central Mediterranean group (Italy, Slovenia, Croatia, Bosnia & Herzegovina, Montenegro, North Macedonia and Malta) ===
These following names were chosen for this storm season by the Central Mediterranean group.

- Alessio
- Barbara
- Cassio
- Deborah
- Erminio
- Frida (unused)
- Gennaro (unused)
- Isotta (unused)
- Lino (unused)
- Mila (unused)
- Nano (unused)
- Olga (unused)
- Pedro (unused)
- Ruslana (unused)
- Santillo (unused)
- Tamara (unused)
- Ubaldo (unused)
- Vanessa (unused)
- Zeno (unused)

=== Eastern Mediterranean group (Greece, Israel and Cyprus) ===
The Eastern Mediterranean group works slightly differently compared to other naming lists, instead of ending a season on 31 August of that year, they end the season on 30 September of that year. These are the names that were chosen for the 2025–26 season in Greece, Israel and Cyprus:

- Adel
- Byron
- Cornaro (unused)
- David (unused)
- Elina (unused)
- Fivos (unused)
- Gaya (unused)
- Heron (unused)
- Ionia (unused)
- Jonathan (unused)
- Kassandra (unused)
- Leonidas (unused)
- Maya (unused)
- Nestor (unused)
- Olimpia (unused)
- Paz (unused)
- Riginos (unused)
- Sivan (unused)
- Talos (unused)
- Urania (unused)
- Vardi (unused)
- Xenophon (unused)
- Yuval (unused)
- Zorbas (unused)

=== Northern group (Denmark, Norway and Sweden) ===
Much like the naming system used by the Free University of Berlin, this group did not use a pre-set list prior to 2026, instead naming storms as they occurred. Starting in 2026, the northern group established a unified list shared among its member countries. Storm Johannes serves as the final storm to be named independently under the old system.

- Johannes

Starting 1 January 2026, the northern group transitioned to a unified list, similar to other European naming groups, and will name storms accordingly. The official list for the region is provided below.

- Anna
- Bjørn (unused)
- Cecilia (unused)
- Daniel (unused)
- Elena (unused)
- Filip (unused)
- Gunilla (unused)
- Hugo (unused)
- Ida (unused)
- Johan (unused)
- Karin (unused)
- Lukas (unused)
- Miriam (unused)
- Noah (unused)
- Olivia (unused)
- Pelle (unused)
- Ronja (unused)
- Sture (unused)
- Tonje (unused)
- Urban (unused)
- Vilma (unused)
- Ymer (unused)

=== Central/FUB naming group (Germany, Switzerland, Austria, Poland, Czech Republic, Slovakia and Hungary) ===
Like the northern group, the Free University of Berlin names storms based on low pressures across the continent and does not use a naming list. The critical new criterion for FUB inclusion is that the storm must prompt a widespread orange weather warning or greater across the affected Central, NE, or SE regions of Europe.

- Lothar
- Wolfgang
- Nils
- Roman
- Patricia
- Ylvi
- Bernadette
- Priska

=== Atlantic ex-tropical cyclones ===
Ex-tropical cyclones (subtropical storms, tropical storms, or hurricanes) that directly impacted a European country from the 2025 Atlantic hurricane season or the 2026 Atlantic hurricane season which became a European windstorm and retained its name as assigned by the National Hurricane Center (NHC) in Miami, Florida.

- Gabrielle

== Season summary ==
Western group
South-western group
Northern group
FUB naming group
Central Mediterranean group
Eastern Mediterranean group

All storms named by European meteorological organisations in their respective forecasting areas, as well as Atlantic hurricanes that transitioned into European windstorms and retained the name assigned by the National Hurricane Center:

== Storms ==
=== Storm Alessio (Calvin) ===
Storm Alessio
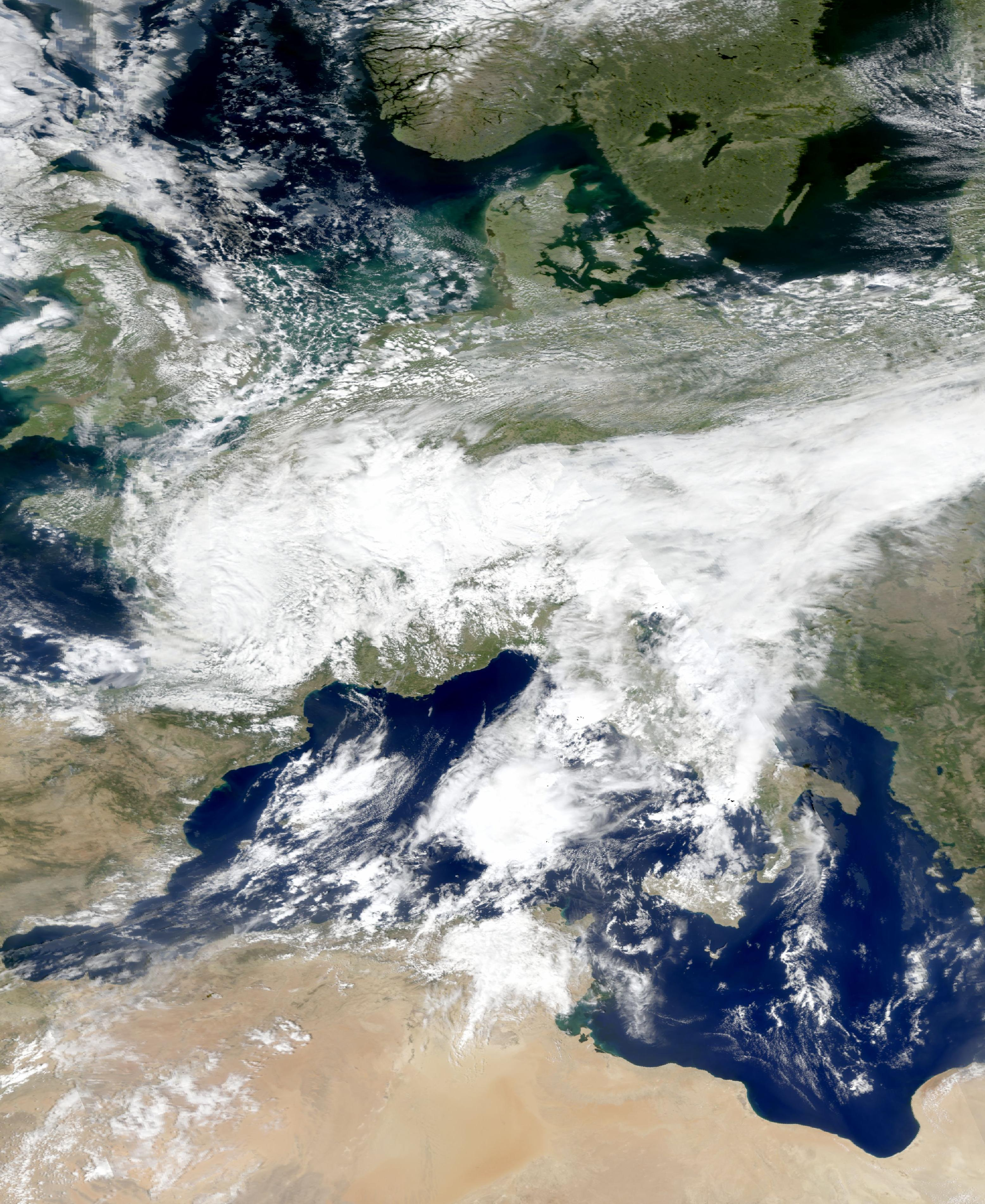

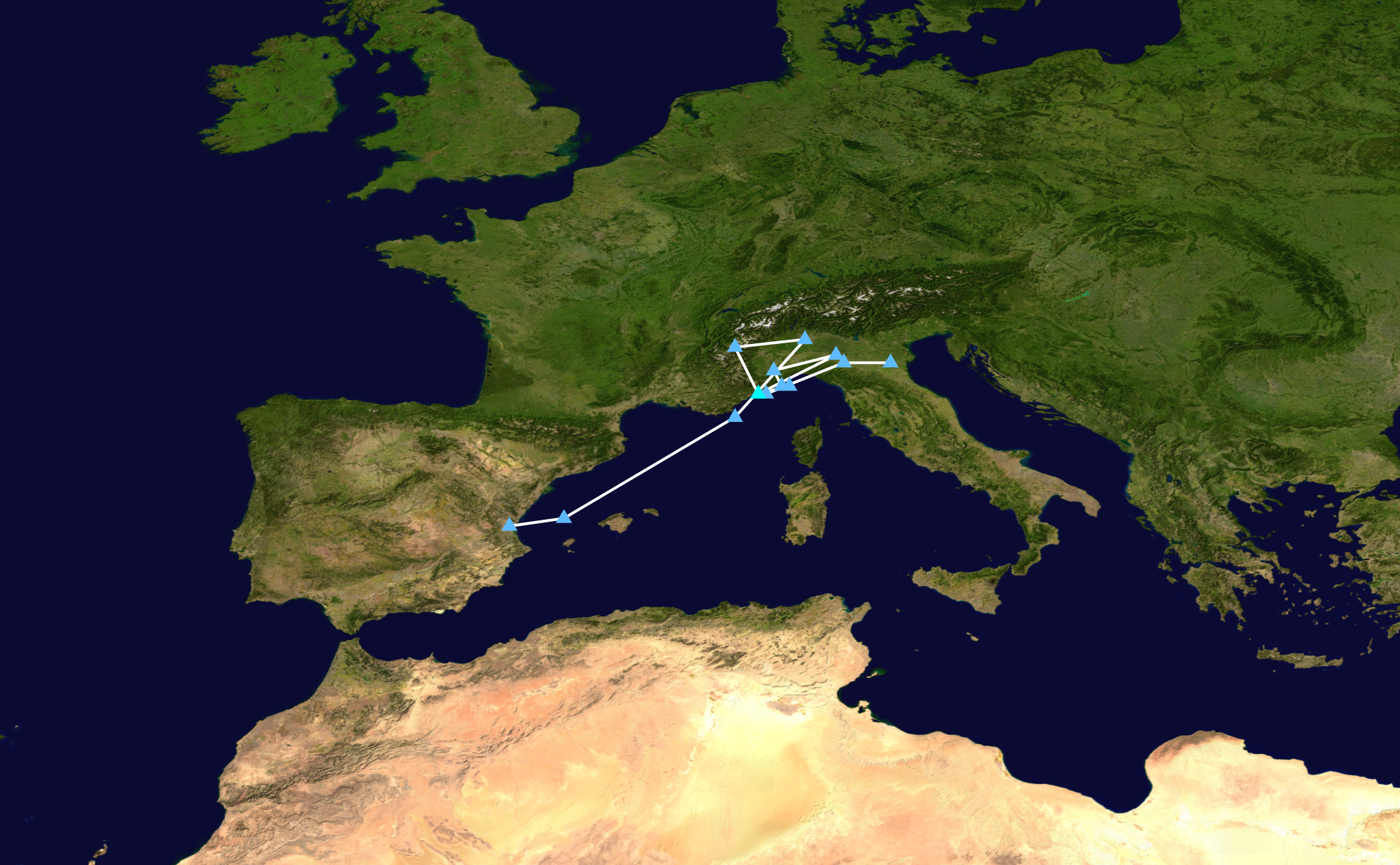
- Area affected: Italy, Spain, Switzerland, Slovenia, Croatia
- Date of impact: 22–24 September 2025
- Maximum wind gust: Unspecified
- Lowest pressure: 1,008 hPa (29.77 inHg)
- Fatalities: 2
- Power outages: Unspecified

==== Date named and background ====
Named on 22 September 2025 by the Italian Servizio Meteorologico and Calvin by Free University of Berlin, Alessio was the first named storm of the season for the central Mediterranean group. The system impacted Italy, Spain, Switzerland, Slovenia, and Croatia. Though it maintained a relatively high central pressure, it was responsible for at least two fatalities during its passage.

==== Weather warnings issued ====
Servizio Meteorologico, issued red rain warnings for the regions of Piemonte, Toscana and Lazio. With orange rain warnings being issued for Veneto, Lombardia and Liguria. AEMET issued orange warnings for heavy rain and thunderstorm for parts of Balearic Islands.

==== Storm impacts ====
Two fatalities were reported during the storm in Spain. The bodies of a father and his 11-year-old son were found after they were swept away by flash flooding on 21 September.

=== Ex-Hurricane Gabrielle ===
Ex-Hurricane Gabrielle
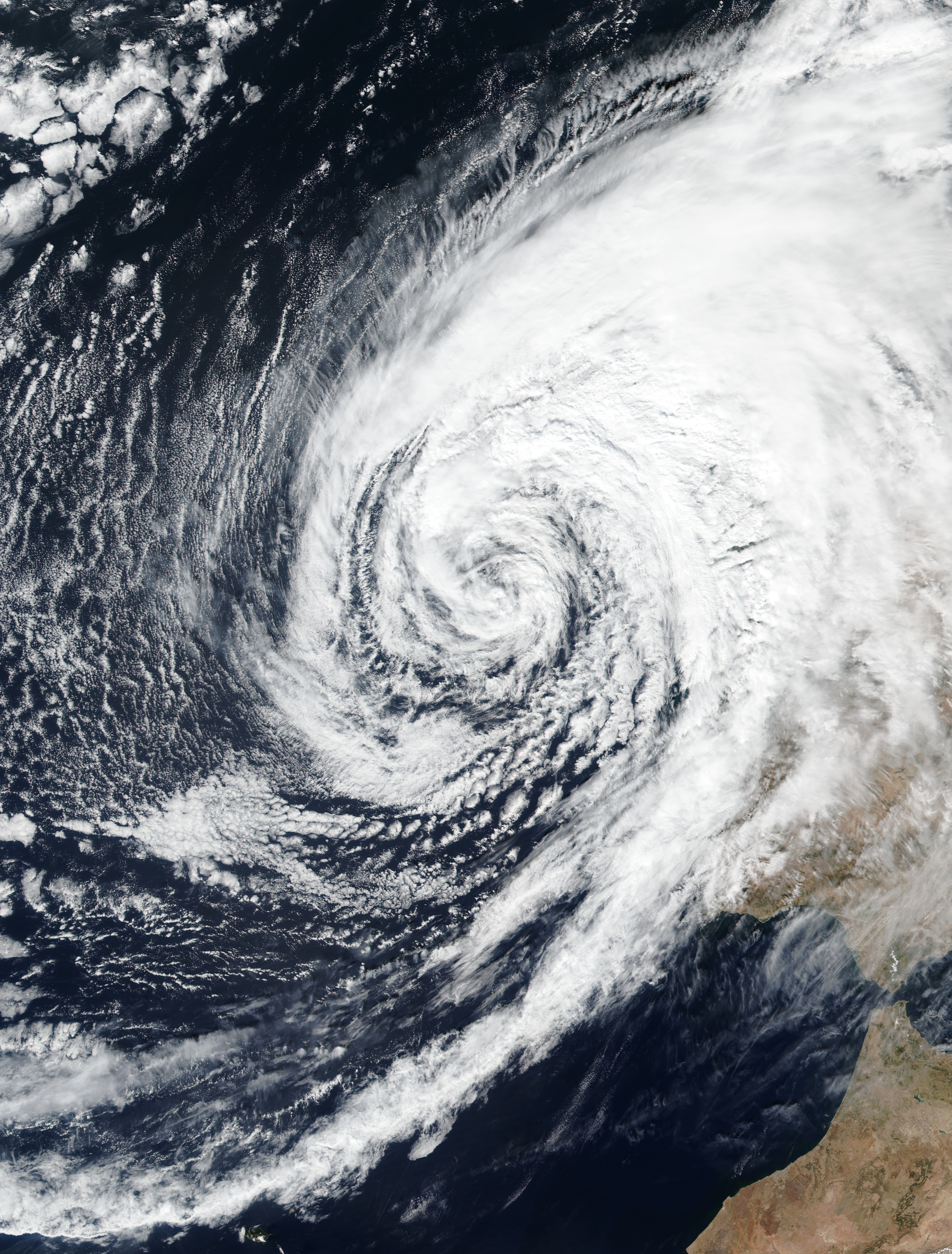

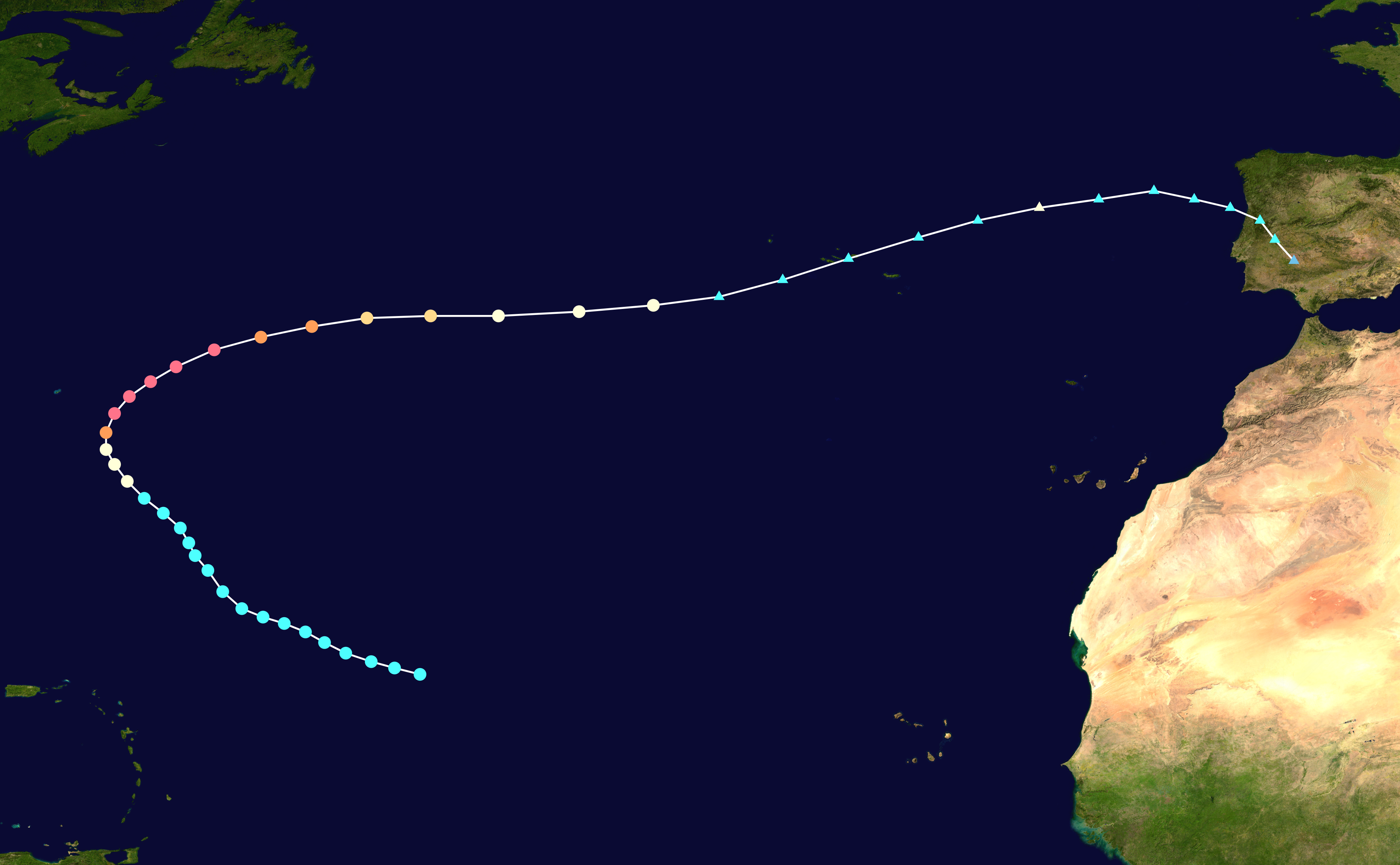
- Area affected: Azores, Iberian Peninsula
- Date of impact: 25–29 September 2025
- Maximum wind gust: 83 knots (154 km/h; 96 mph)
- Lowest pressure: 982 hPa (29.00 inHg)
- Fatalities: 0
- Power outages: Unspecified

==== Date named and background ====
Hurricane Gabrielle, named by the National Hurricane Center, formed in the main development region of the Atlantic Ocean on 17 September. It peaked as a powerful Category 4 hurricane east of Bermuda. The system then began to accelerate as it approached the Azores archipelago. Gabrielle gradually weakened, and became extratropical a few hundred nautical miles west-southwest of the Azores on 25 September. The storm traversed the Azores then slowed, and moved over the Western Iberian Peninsula on 28 September where it opened up into a trough late that day.

==== Weather warnings issued ====
A hurricane watch was issued for the Azores on 22 September. The watch was upgraded to a warning on 24 September. The IPMA issued orange and yellow alerts for all of the Azores. Flores and Corvo were placed under a red alert for precipitation. Terceira, Faial, Pico, São Jorge, and Graciosa were placed under a red alert for wind and rough seas. Orange alerts were eventually issued for the eastern islands.

As ex-Hurricane Gabrielle impacted the Iberian Peninsula, red alerts for rain were issued for eastern parts of Spain, and 200 mm (7.9 in) of precipitation was expected to fall within 24 hours.

==== Storm impacts ====
Schools and government buildings in the central and western Azores were closed for Gabrielle. Ports in Madalena, Lajes, and Horta were closed. Flight plans were interrupted from 25 to 27 September in the Azores. This unusual event prompted officials to urge residents and visitors to take all necessary precautions as the storm approached the islands.

=== Storm Amy (Detlef) ===
Storm Amy (Detlef)
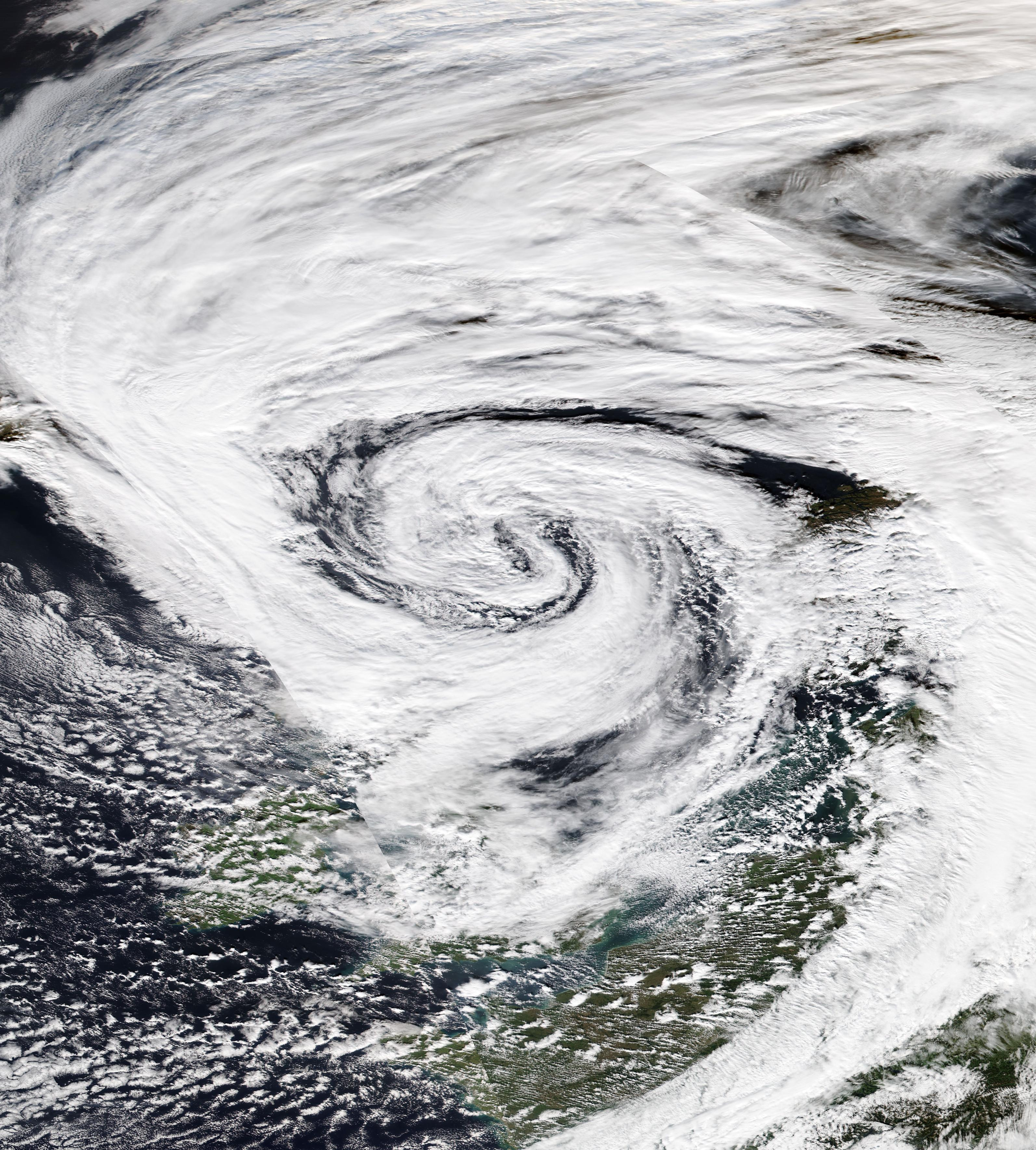

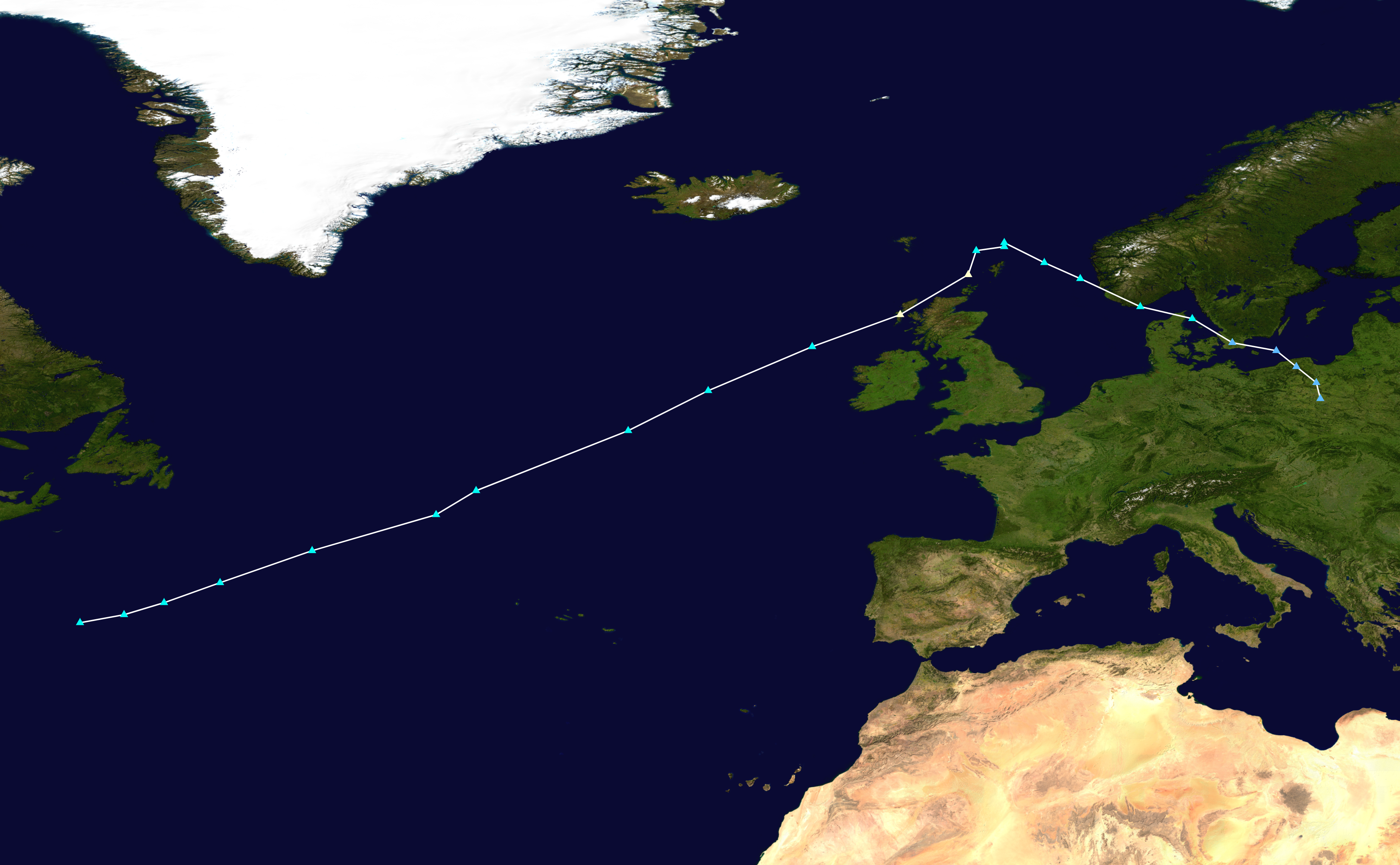
- Area affected: United Kingdom, Ireland, Norway, Denmark, Sweden
- Date of impact: 2–6 October 2025
- Maximum wind gust: 139 mph (62 m/s; 121 kn; 224 km/h) at Folgefonna, Norway
- Lowest pressure: 942 hPa (27.82 inHg)
- Fatalities: 4
- Power outages: 559,665+

==== Date named and background ====
Amy, known as Detlef in Germany, was the first storm named by the western group (Met Office) on 1 October. A powerful "weather bomb", it reached a peak intensity of 942 hPa (27.8 inHg) and produced a 139 mph gust at Folgefonna, Norway. The storm caused widespread damage and four deaths across France, Ireland, and Poland. Over 832,000 homes lost power across Northern Europe, with Sweden reporting its worst outages since 2019.

==== Weather warnings issued ====
Chief Meteorologist Tom Crabtree says, the system would bring gale-force winds across northern and island areas of Scotland, with gusts widely reaching 50 to 60 miles per hour (22 to 27 m/s; 43 to 52 kn; 80 to 97 km/h) inland in the Caithness, Sutherland, and Hebrides areas, and potentially reaching 70 to 80 miles per hour (31 to 36 m/s; 61 to 70 kn; 110 to 130 km/h) in places. A yellow rain warning was in force for western and central parts of Scotland as 20–30 mm (0.79–1.18 in) of rain was expected widely in a 6–9 hour period with 40–50 mm (1.6–2.0 in) over some hilly areas in the Southwest and the Southern Highlands. Accompanying this was a large yellow wind warning for Scotland, which was upgraded to an Amber warning in northwestern parts of Scotland as well as western parts of Northern Ireland. A yellow wind warning from northern and western England, stretching down to north Wales, was in force with another wind warning in force for Northern Ireland, an area where 60–70 miles per hour (27–31 m/s; 52–61 kn; 97–113 km/h) winds where expected widely with 80 miles per hour (36 m/s; 70 kn; 130 km/h) and above expected in exposed areas. A yellow wind warning was later issued, covering the rest of south-west, central, southern, south-eastern and eastern England, as well as southern Wales, with gusts of 45–55 mph (20–25 m/s; 39–48 kn; 72–89 km/h) possible in places, and perhaps 60–65 mph (27–29 m/s; 52–56 kn; 97–105 km/h) along some exposed coasts.

For Ireland a yellow wind warning was in place for the whole country, with the main cause for concern for Met Éireann being difficult travelling conditions, debris and loose objects displaced, and some fallen trees possible. A man in his forties died in the town of Letterkenny in County Donegal around 16:15 on 3 October.

For parts of southern and western Norway, red-severity warnings for extremely strong wind gusts along the Skagerrak coast and extremely heavy rain in parts of Telemark and Vestfold. Widespread orange-severity warnings were also in effect for very strong winds, very heavy rain, flooding, and the potential for debris avalanches and debris flows across various parts of the region. These will result in an expected high risk of cancelled flights, ferries and other transport disruptions.

Danish Meteorological Institute issued warnings for high winds, heavy rain, and elevated water levels this weekend due to Storm Amy. Gale-force to stormy-gale winds, with hurricane-force gusts possible, were expected sweep the region, mainly on Jutland's coasts. Simultaneously, widespread heavy rain is expected Saturday, potentially dropping 40–60 mm (1.6–2.4 in) in some spots. High water levels up to 3.0 m (9.8 ft) were anticipated in the Wadden Sea and along the west coast of Jutland.

==== Storm impacts ====
In France two people have died due to the storm, the first one drowned and the second got killed in his car with a collapsed tree and second person was injured.

In Scotland, a gust of 96 mph (43 m/s; 83 kn; 154 km/h) was recorded on Tiree whilst power cuts were reported in the Highlands. In Glasgow, a derelict building collapsed onto a car amid high winds on Broomielaw, forcing the road to close. A train travelling between Aberdeen and Inverurie hit a fallen tree, leaving around a dozen passengers stranded on the train. The Forth Road Bridge was closed, whilst high-sided vehicles were expected to be prevented from crossing the Clackmannanshire Bridge, Kincardine Bridge, Tyne Bridge and possibly the Queensferry Crossing. The Highland, Kyle, West Highland and Wick railway lines were closed and speed restrictions were placed on all Scottish routes, whilst many ferries from Cairnryan Harbour to Northern Ireland were cancelled.

In Wales, around 600 properties lost power in Carmarthenshire and the Severn Bridge was closed in both directions. A fallen tree near Gobowen forced rail services to be suspended between Shrewsbury and Wrexham.

=== Storm Barbara ===
Storm Barbara
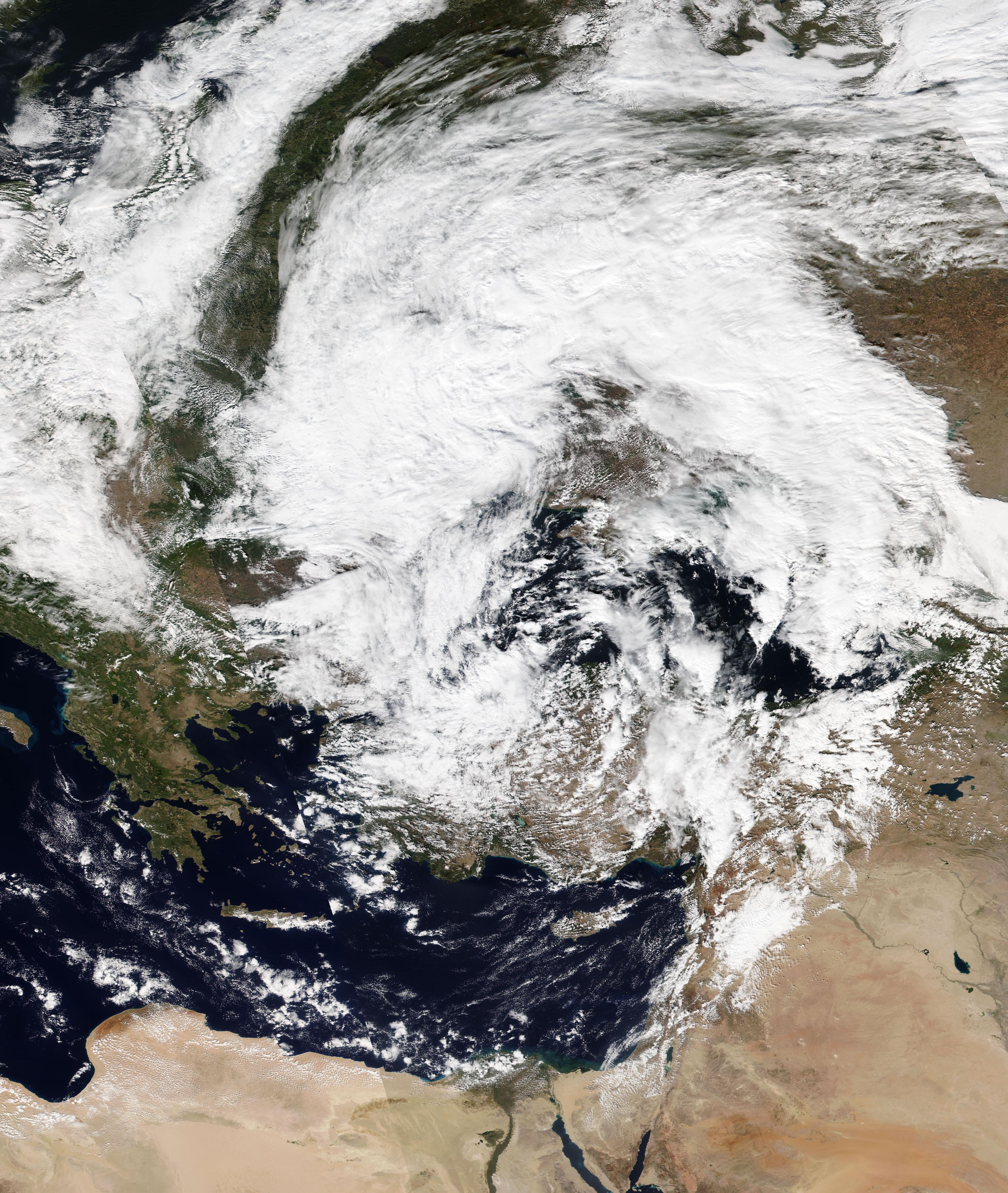

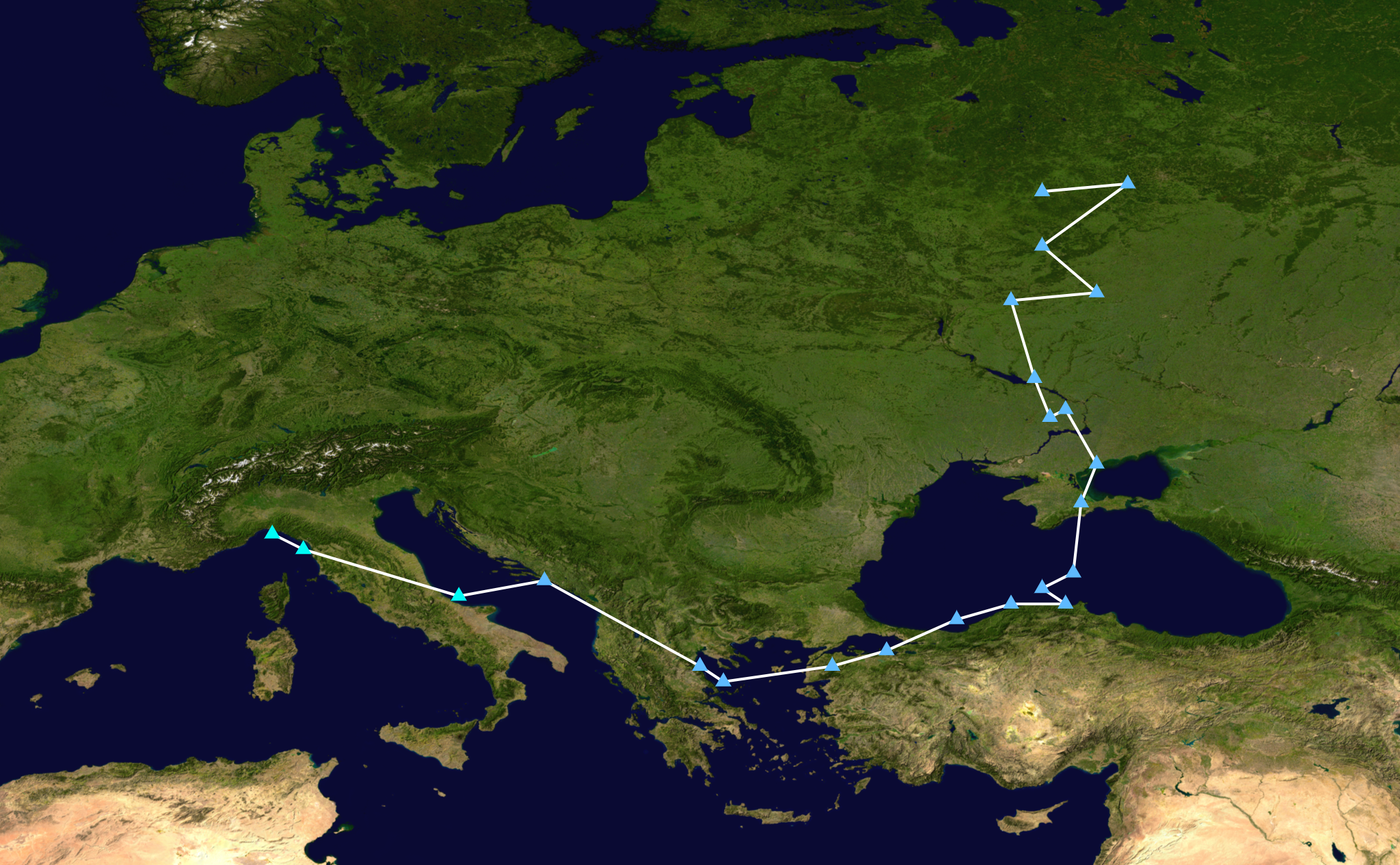
- Area affected: Italy, the Balkans, Turkey, Romania, Moldova, Ukraine
- Date of impact: 5–10 October 2025
- Maximum wind gust: Unspecified
- Lowest pressure: 1,003 hPa (29.62 inHg)
- Fatalities: 0
- Power outages: Unspecified

==== Date named and background ====
Part of the central Mediterranean group's list, Storm Barbara followed shortly after Amy. It brought unsettled weather to the Mediterranean basin, particularly affecting Italy and the Balkan Peninsula, contributing to the season's early total of fatalities.

==== Weather warnings issued ====
Italy had orange wind warnings for the east coast south and not including San Marino to the heel of Italy. Further afield, red wind warnings were in force for the Velebit channel region of Croatia as well as orange rain warnings for surrounding inland parts of the country. Orange rain and wind warnings were in force for most areas in Montenegro. Elsewhere, yellow rain warnings were inforce for parts of Slovenia, Bosnia and Herzegovina and Serbia.

Orange rain warnings were put up for Bulgaria, with the east of the country having red rain warnings as well as south-eastern Romania. Red rain warnings were also inforce for parts of Romania, Moldova and south-western Ukraine.

==== Storm impacts ====
The system brought record-breaking rainfall to Romania and Greece. Bucharest recorded its wettest October day in history during this event.

=== Storm Alice ===
Storm Alice
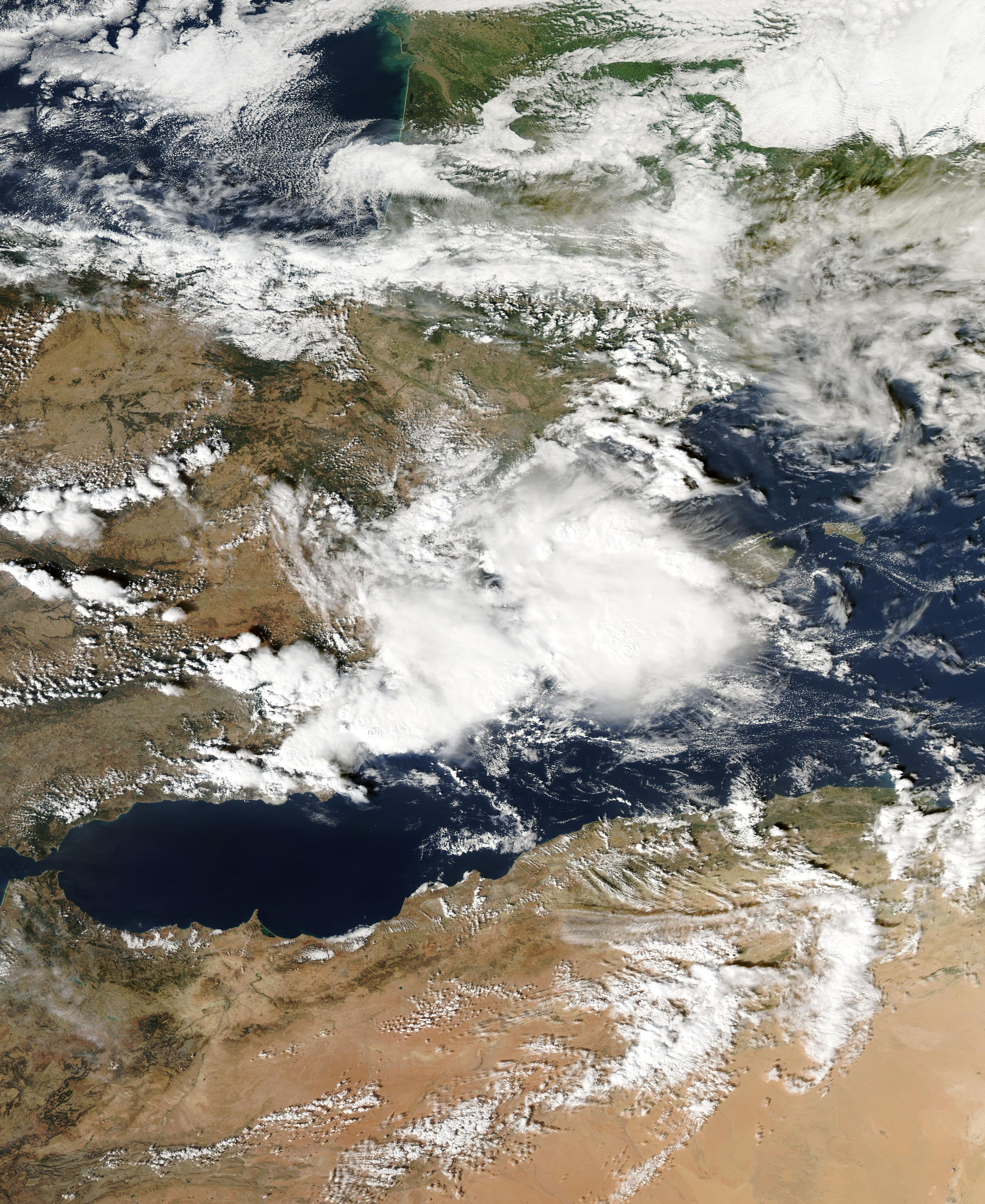

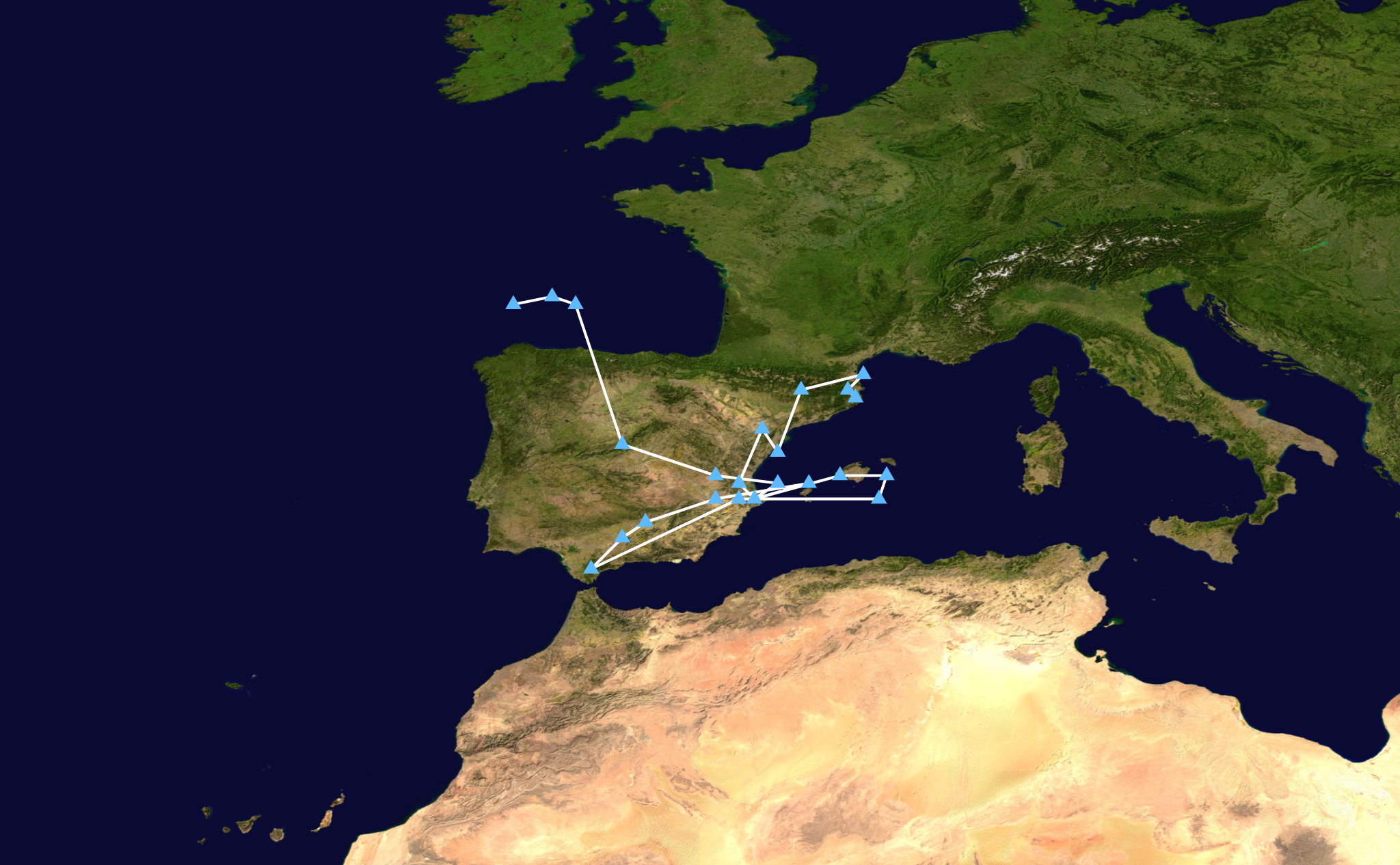
- Area affected: Eastern Spain and Balearic Islands
- Date of impact: 7–10 October 2025
- Maximum wind gust: Unspecified
- Lowest pressure: 1,015 hPa (29.97 inHg)
- Fatalities: 0
- Power outages: Unspecified

==== Date named and background ====
Alice, named on 7 October 2025 was the first name used from the south-western group's list for the 2025–26 season. The system targeted the Iberian Peninsula, bringing heavy rain and wind to Portugal and Spain. A very small and weak area of low pressure known locally as a DANA (Depresión Aislada en Niveles Altos, a cut-off low).

==== Weather warnings issued ====
Alice was a very small and weak area of low pressure that formed over the Iberian Peninsula near the Strait of Gibraltar that prompted the AEMET to issue amber and yellow warnings for rain for the southern Balearic Islands and eastern Spain. On the morning of 10 October, Spain issued an 'extreme risk' red weather warning for rain and flooding in Alicante and Murcia, Spain.

==== Storm impacts ====
It caused widespread flooding, with flights cancelled into Murcia.

=== Storm Benjamin (Joshua) ===
Storm Benjamin
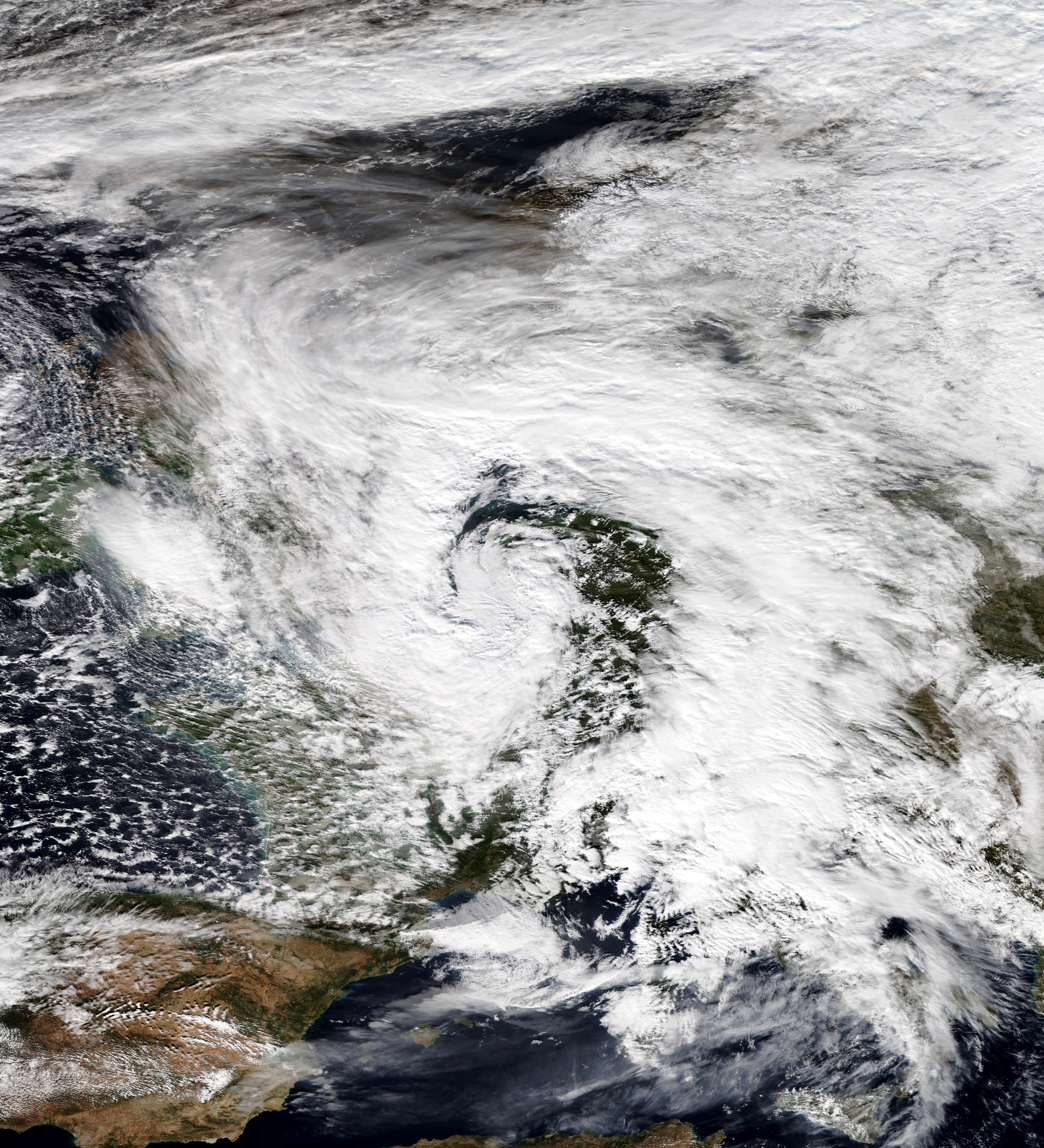

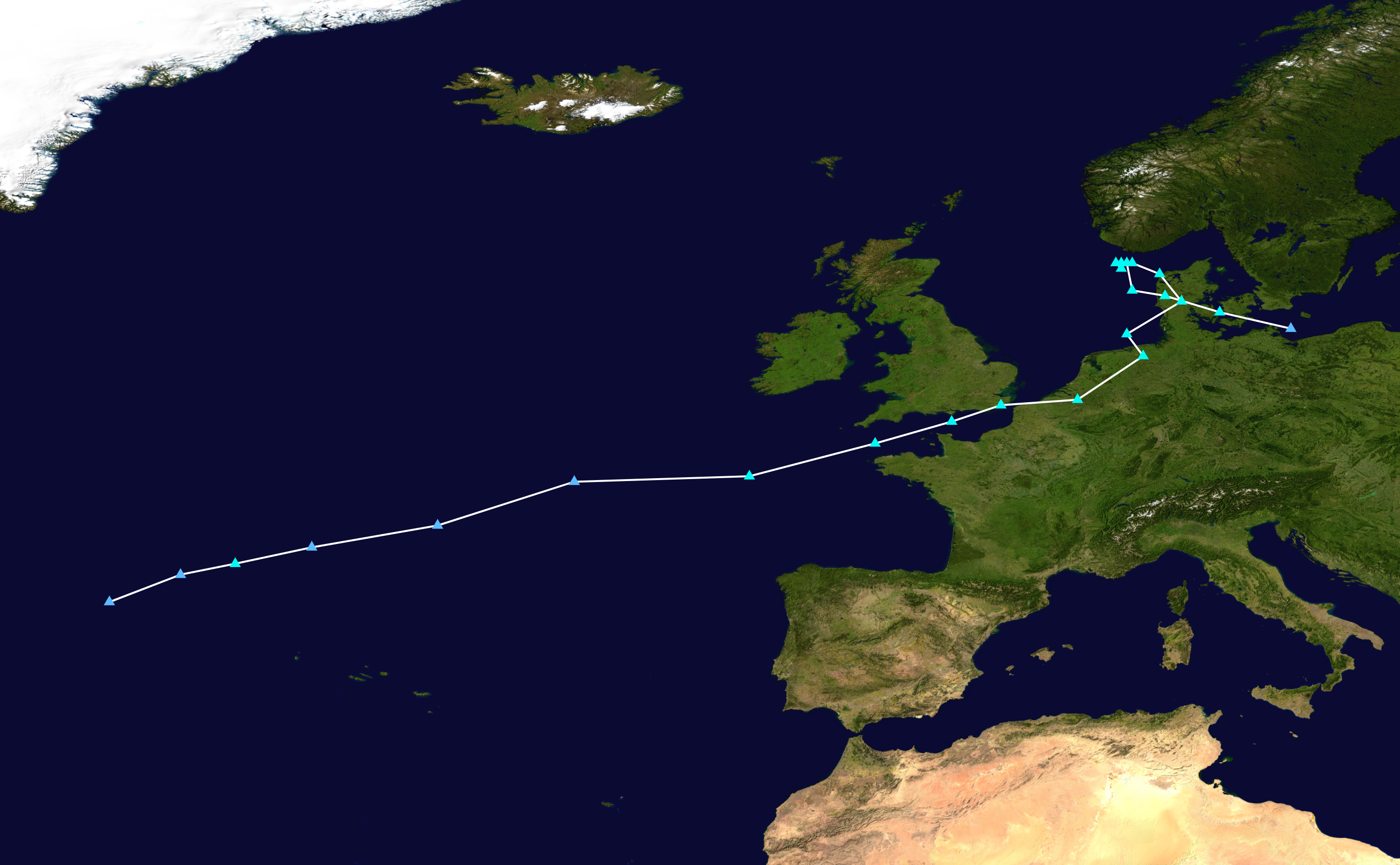
- Area affected: United Kingdom, France, Spain, Netherlands, Belgium, Germany, Norway
- Date of impact: 22–26 October 2025
- Maximum wind gust: 104 mph (46 m/s; 90 kn; 167 km/h)
- Lowest pressure: 969 hPa (28.61 inHg)
- Fatalities: 1
- Power outages: Unspecified

==== Date named and background ====
Named by Météo-France on 22 October, Benjamin, known as Joshua by the FUB was a significant system that affected a broad area from France and Spain to the UK and Norway. It attained a minimum pressure of 969 hPa (28.6 inHg) and produced wind gusts up to 100 mph. The storm caused notable travel disruptions and structural damage across Western Europe.

==== Weather warnings issued ====
Met Office issued yellow warnings for rain and wind across many parts of England and South Wales. Météo-France placed orange warnings for wind, wave and rain-flood. Belgium and the Netherlands also issued orange wind warnings for coastal areas. AEMET issued a red alert for stormy seas for sections of the northern Spanish coast.

==== Storm impacts ====
The storm resulted in one fatality and hundreds of millions of euros in insured losses. In France, wind gusts peaking at 104 mph (168 km/h) caused over 140,000 households to lose power, while a 45-year-old tourist was swept away by a river in Corsica. Additionally, 16 people were injured across the Charente-Maritime and Gironde departments. Travel across the continent was crippled, with Amsterdam Schiphol Airport cancelling more than 200 flights and London Heathrow reporting dozens of cancellations. The aviation disruption affected over 32,000 passengers at Schiphol alone, as safety protocols restricted operations to a single runway. In the Netherlands and the UK, fallen trees and downed power lines halted train services between major cities like Amsterdam, Rotterdam, and London, while ferry crossings in the English Channel were suspended due to treacherous maritime conditions. Infrastructure damage was extensive, with local flooding submerged roadways and coastal erosion damaging tourist sites like the Dune du Pilat. In the UK, more than 2,000 homes lost power, and heavy rainfall led to over a dozen rivers overflowing their banks, causing localised flooding in eastern and southern counties. As the storm system moved toward the North Sea, it pulled in a mass of Arctic air that resulted in a sharp temperature crash and the season's first significant snowfall in the Scottish Highlands.

A tornado north of Paris in Val-d’Oise on 20 October, days before Benjamin, is not related to the storm, according to Météo-France and Keraunos.

=== Storm Lothar ===
Storm Lothar
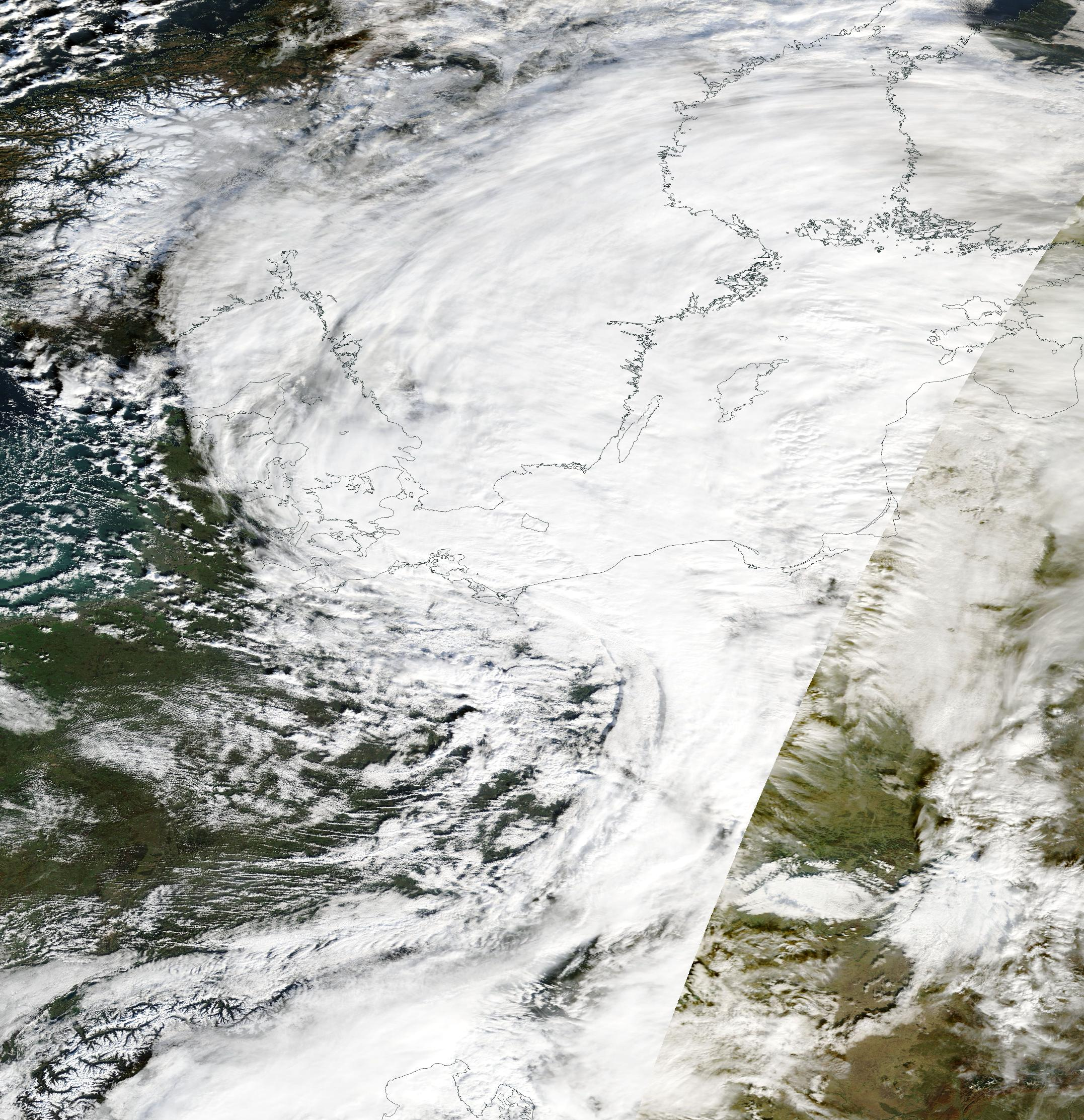

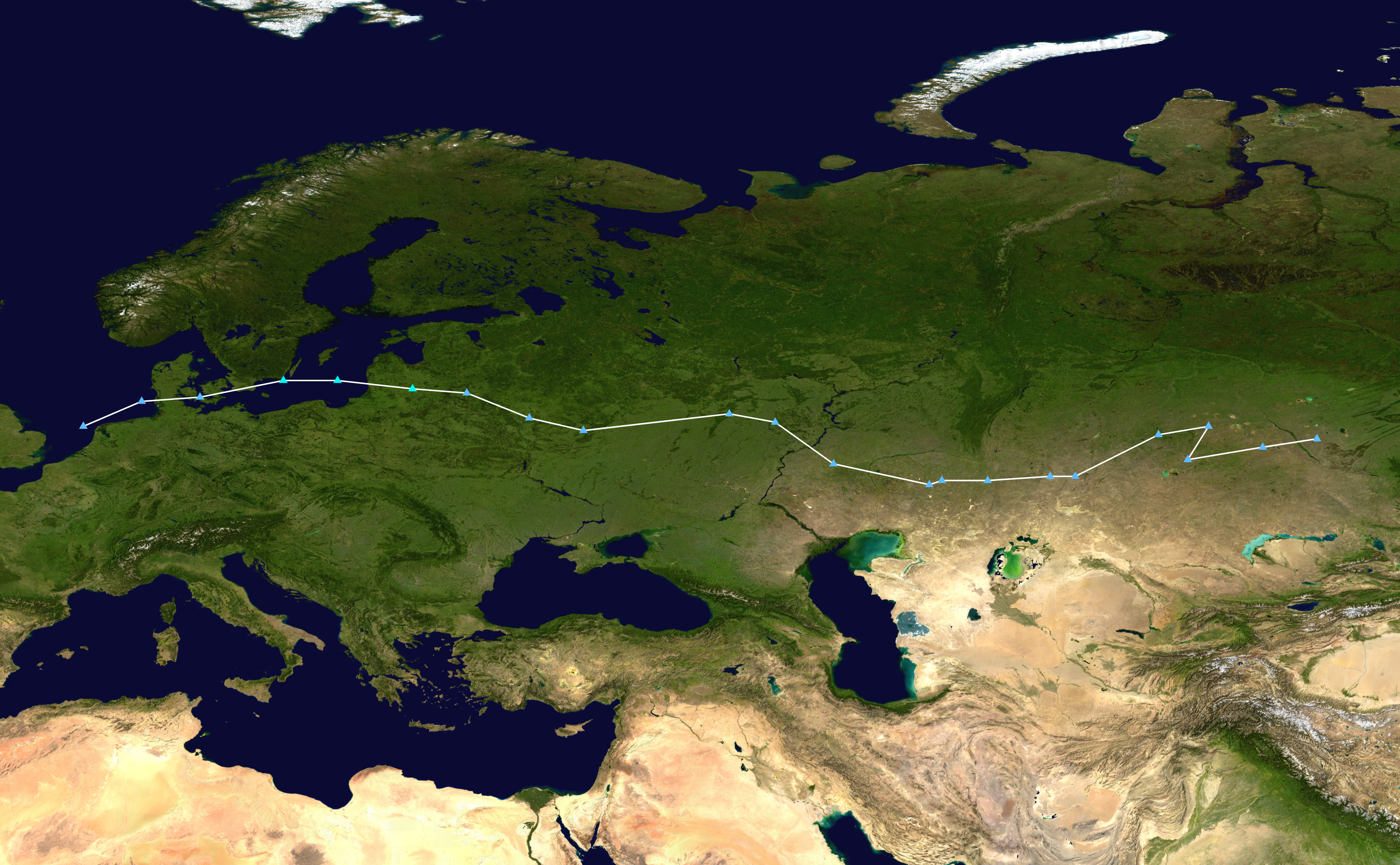
- Area affected: United Kingdom, France, Spain, Netherlands, Belgium, Germany, Norway, Sweden, Poland, Ukraine, Lithuania, Latvia, Estonia, Russia
- Date of impact: 26–31 October 2025
- Maximum wind gust: Unspecified
- Lowest pressure: 988 hPa (29.18 inHg)
- Power outages: Unspecified

==== Date named and background ====
Named by the Free University of Berlin (FUB), Lothar tracked across a wide swath of Europe, including the UK, France, Germany, and the Baltic states. It brought a prolonged period of gale-force winds and heavy rain to Northern and Central Europe, resulting in localised flooding.

==== Weather warnings issued ====
Storm Lothar, when weak, passed over Scotland, as a shallow low on 29 October, bringing heavy rain to parts of south-eastern England and northern and eastern France, prompting yellow rain/flood warnings for central-eastern parts of the country. Deutscher Wetterdienst issued orange wind warnings for north-western provinces bordering Denmark. A yellow wind warning was also issued for north-western areas of Germany. The next day on 30 October, Deutscher Wetterdienst expanded orange wind warnings to cover northern and eastern parts of the country, with a red offshore wind warning for north-west Poland.

=== Storm Claudia (Pepe) ===
Storm Claudia
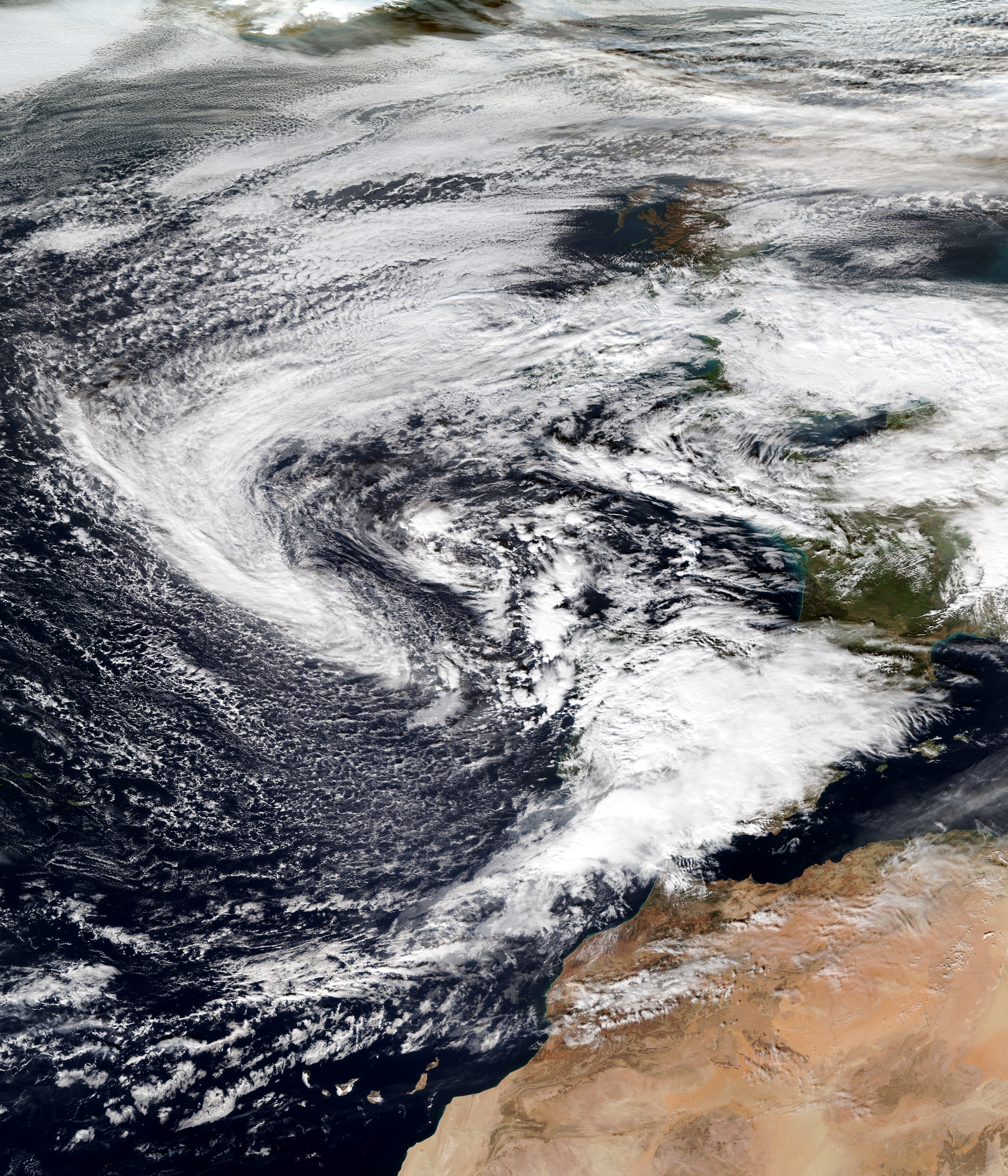

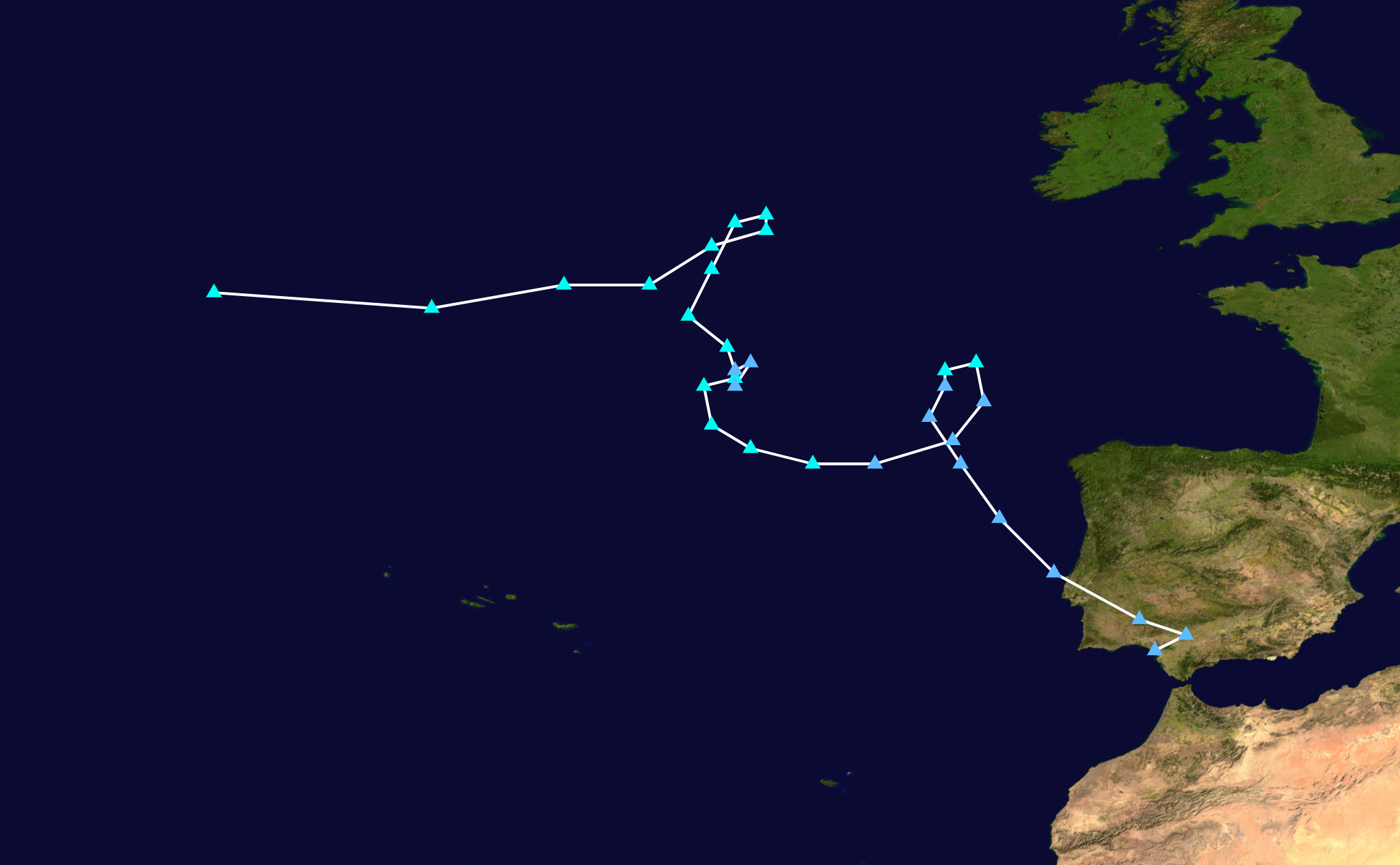
- Area affected: United Kingdom, Ireland, Spain, Portugal
- Date of impact: 10–17 November 2025
- Maximum wind gust: Unspecified
- Lowest pressure: 970 hPa (28.64 inHg)
- Fatalities: 3
- Power outages: Unspecified

==== Date named and background ====
Named by AEMET on 10 November, Claudia, known as Pepe by FUB, made landfall in Western Europe with significant impact. The storm was particularly deadly in southern Portugal, where at least three people were killed and dozens were injured. It later moved across the UK and Ireland on 14 November, particularly impacting Wales.

==== Weather warnings issued ====
Spain and Portugal experienced the most intense effects and subsequent warnings from Storm Claudia, which centered over the Iberian Peninsula and the Canary Islands. Portugal's IPMA had issued widespread Yellow Warnings for Rain, Strong Winds (up to 80–90 km/h, 22–25 m/s, 43–49 kn, 50–56 mph gusts), and Rough Seas across the mainland, particularly affecting coastal and northern districts. The Madeira Archipelago was placed under an Orange Warning for heavy rain and thunderstorms. In the coast of Fernão Ferro, a couple in their 80s was found dead in their flooded home. In Spain, AEMET implemented Orange Alerts for the Canary Islands, specifically La Palma, due to the high risk of flooding from torrential rain (forecasted up to 100 mm or 3.9 in). Widespread Yellow Alerts were in place across the archipelago for heavy rain and gusty winds, and Yellow Alerts were also issued for heavy rainfall and winds up to 80 km/h (22 m/s; 43 kn; 50 mph) in the mainland's northwest, particularly in Galicia.

The United Kingdom and Ireland felt the influence of an associated frontal system trailing Claudia. The Met Office issued a joint Yellow Rain and Wind Warning for South West England (including Cornwall, Devon, and Somerset), where heavy rain was expected to accumulate significantly (up to 60–80 mm (2.4–3.1 in) over exposed high ground), accompanied by strong southerly winds and coastal gales, leading to difficult driving conditions and localised flooding. Furthermore, Met Éireann had issued Status Yellow Rain Warnings for various counties in the south and east of Ireland, and the UK Met Office maintained Yellow Rain Warnings for Northern Ireland due to persistent rain and stronger winds along the Irish Sea coastlines.

On 13 November, the Met Office issued a severe Amber Rain Warning for 14 November, covering large areas of Wales, the Midlands, western East Anglia, and South West England due to Storm Claudia. The key impacts of this high-level alert include a risk of danger to life from fast-flowing floodwater, homes and businesses being flooded, widespread travel cancellations and delays (especially on road and rail), and the potential for some communities to be cut off by floodwater. Rainfall was expected to be exceptional, with totals of 50–150 mm (2.0–5.9 in) possible across the affected areas. Also, Met Éireann issued an Orange Rain Warning for three eastern counties: Dublin, Wexford, and Wicklow. This high-level warning signifies a significant risk of severe and dangerous flooding due to exceptionally high rainfall totals falling on already saturated ground, leading to extremely hazardous driving conditions and major travel disruption across these areas.

==== Storm impacts ====
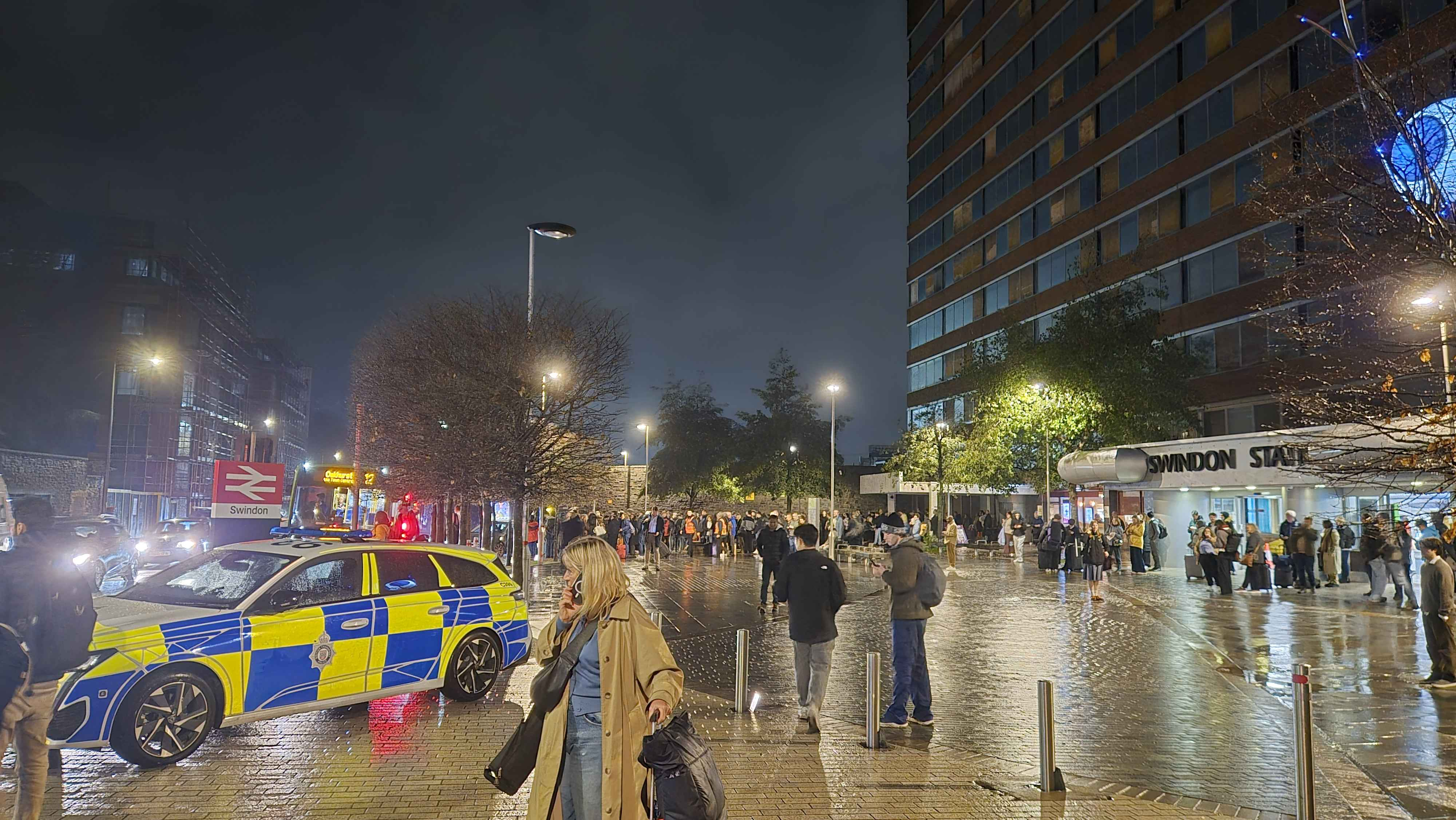
A large crowd forms outside Swindon railway station as trains are cancelled, delayed or simply out of the question because of flooding on the tracks

As of 22:15 on 14 November, Environment Agency has issued more than 150 flood alerts and 39 flood warnings. Two men have been taken to hospital after a head-on crash in a Black Country residential street. Rail services across central and southern areas, including the lines between London Paddington and Bristol/South Wales, and routes in the Midlands (such as around Birmingham New Street), experienced major disruption and cancellations due to flooded tracks, with some passengers advised not to travel. Gusty winds, up to 70 mph (31 m/s; 61 kn; 110 km/h) in parts of North West England and north-west Wales, added to the hazardous conditions. There were reports of power cuts and road closures due to flooding and fallen trees, with conditions expected to remain difficult until the rain eases on Saturday morning.

Storm Claudia caused significant weather impacts across Ireland, with the main concern being widespread flooding expected to persist through the weekend. The Status Orange Rain Warning for Dublin, Wexford, and Wicklow led to hazardous travelling conditions, numerous road closures due to debris and flooding (including in Dublin), and the cancellation of several flights at Dublin Airport. Areas under the broader Yellow warning also saw significant local flooding, particularly in the Laois/Offaly region. A major incident was declared in South Wales due to "severe and widespread" flooding in Monmouth.

=== Storm Wolfgang ===
Storm Wolfgang
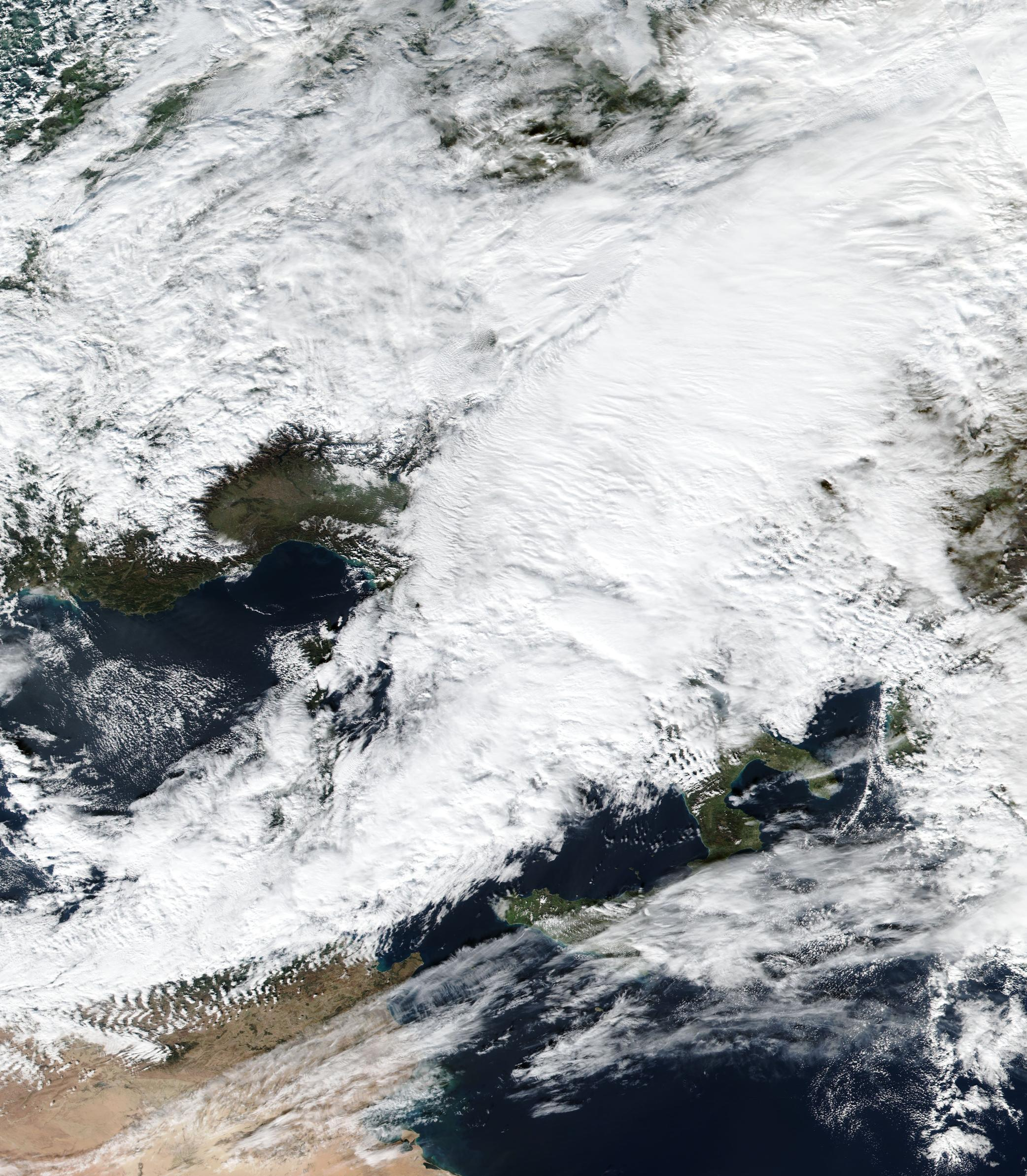

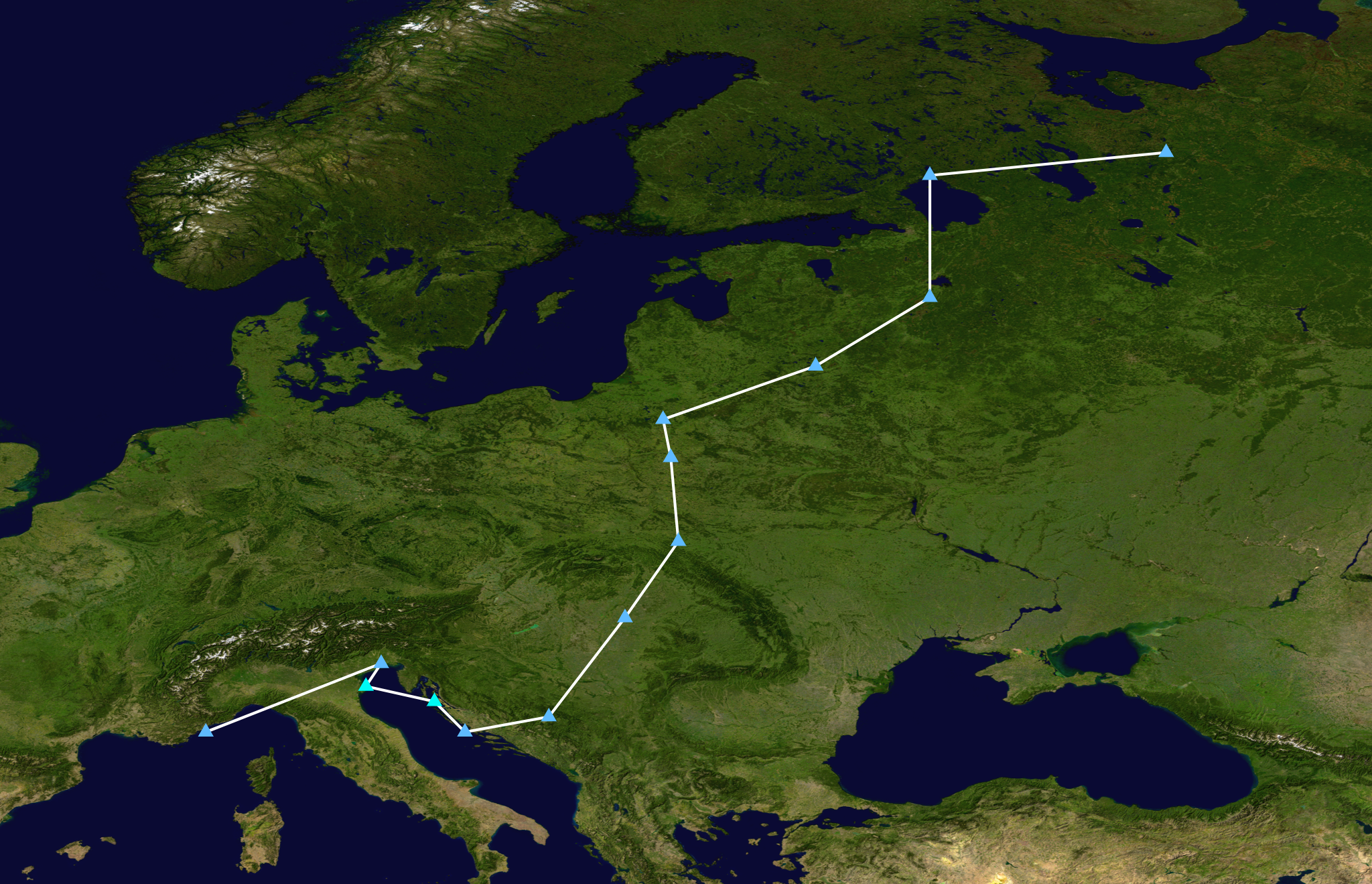
- Area affected: Italy, the Balkans, Poland, Latvia
- Date of impact: 24–27 November 2025
- Maximum wind gust: Unspecified
- Lowest pressure: 997 hPa (29.44 inHg)
- Power outages: Unspecified

==== Date named and background ====
Wolfgang was a FUB-named system named on 24 November, that primarily affected Central Europe, including Germany and Poland. It contributed to the unsettled late-autumn pattern, bringing the first significant mountain snows of the season to the Alps and Tatras.

==== Weather warnings issued ====
The Central Mediterranean and Western Balkans was severely impacted by a low-pressure system during that period, with a dangerous Red Rain Warning having been in effect for Tuesday, 25 November, in Campania, Italy, which included the region of Naples. This Red alert signified a rare, extremely dangerous, and destructive weather event with the highest risk of life-threatening flash flooding, landslides, and major infrastructure damage. Simultaneously, the region was broadly affected by Orange Warnings primarily for heavy rain along the Adriatic coast of Croatia and across large parts of Southern Italy for rain, wind, and thunderstorms, where strong to gale-force south-easterly winds caused very rough seas with wind gusts reaching up to 95 km/h (26 m/s; 51 kn; 59 mph). Broader Yellow Rain and Wind Warnings covered Slovenia, Bosnia and Herzegovina, and Montenegro, where heavy, persistent rainfall and strong winds caused travel difficulties and localised flooding. Poland had issued an Orange/Level 2 warning for heavy snowfall through central regions in Poland. Latvia had an Orange snow warning in force for central and eastern parts of the country.

=== Storm Adel ===
Storm Adel
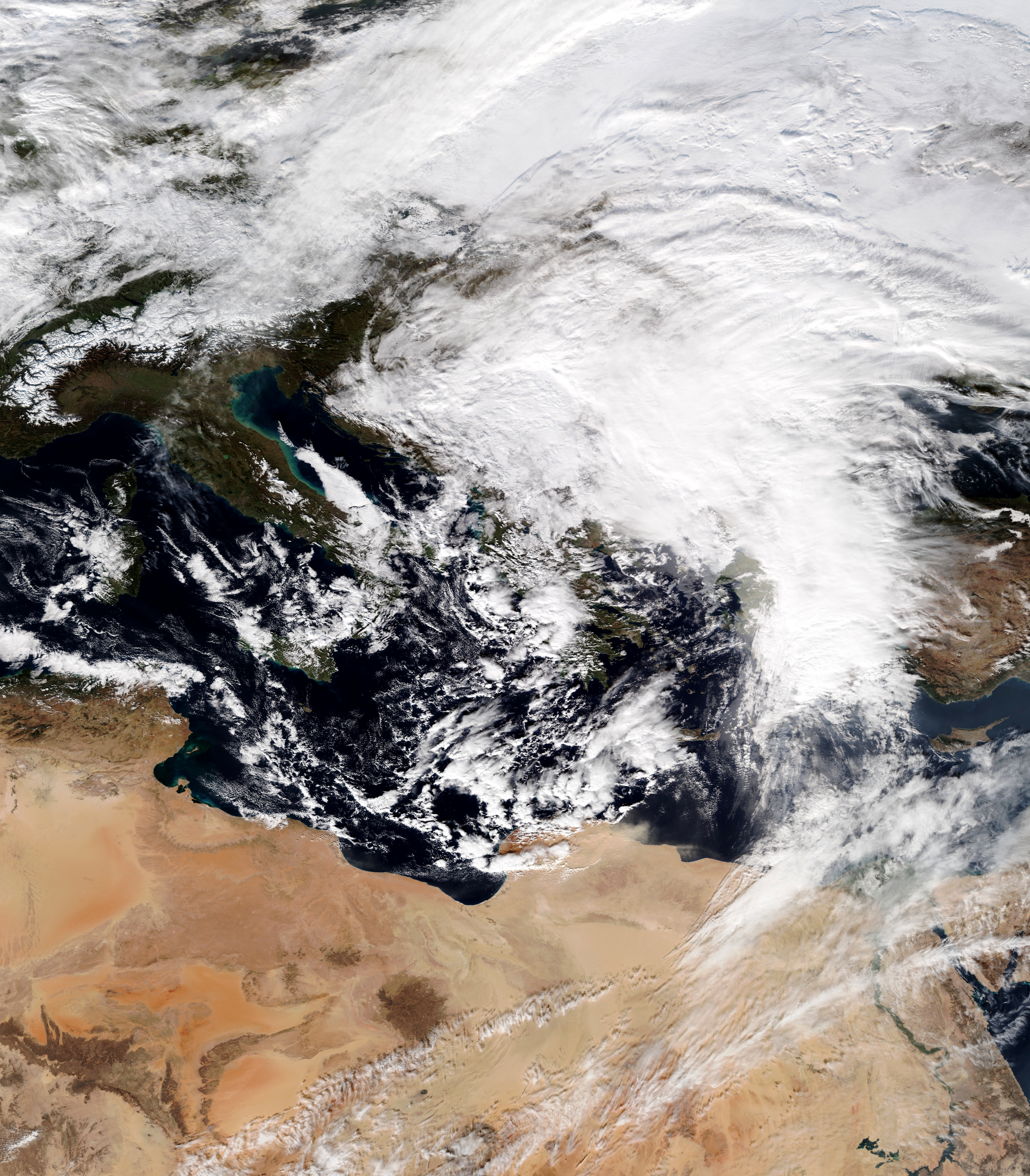

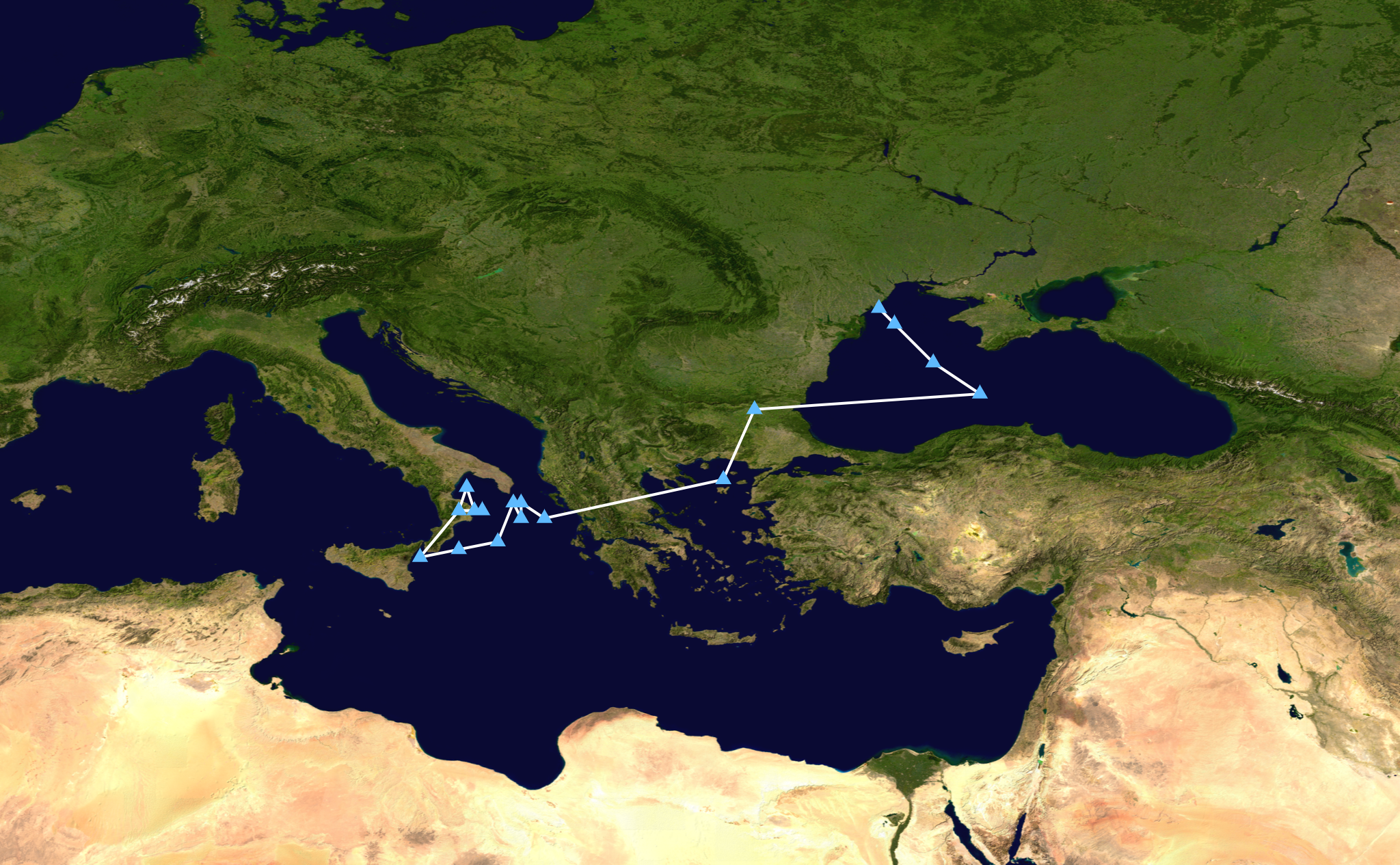
- Area affected: Italy, Greece, Albania, Turkey
- Date of impact: 25–30 November 2025
- Maximum wind gust: Unspecified
- Lowest pressure: 1,004 hPa (29.65 inHg)
- Power outages: Unspecified

==== Date named and background ====
As the first name on the eastern Mediterranean group's list, Adel, named by the Hellenic National Meteorological Service on 25 November 2025, impacted Greece, Albania, and Turkey. The storm brought heavy rain and thunderstorms to the region, leading to localized flash flooding.

==== Weather warnings issued ====
Storm Adel formed quickly behind Storm Wolfgang, forecasted to bring heavy rainfall to Central Italy, and parts of Greece, Albania and western Turkey from 26 to 28 November 2025. On Thursday (27 November) Greece's Metservice warned of heavy rains and storms in the Ionian Islands, Epirus, western and central Sterea, western and southern Peloponnese, central and eastern Macedonia and Thrace. Then again on Friday (28 November) heavy rains and storms are expected in central and eastern Macedonia, Thrace, the eastern Aegean and until early morning in western Greece. Italy, once again issued a red rain warning for Campania, which was impacted a few days prior by Wolfgang, a storm named by the Free University of Berlin that impacted the wider region on 24 November.

==== Storm impacts ====
The storm caused flooding in Corfu and Aetoloacarnania and as a result the schools were closed. Extensive damages also took place in Thasos and Epirus, while damages also occurred in Attica. The highest rainfall was recorded in Theodoriana, at 264 mm (10.4 in), and Pramanta, at 238 mm (9.4 in).

=== Storm Cassio (Dieter I) ===
Storm Cassio
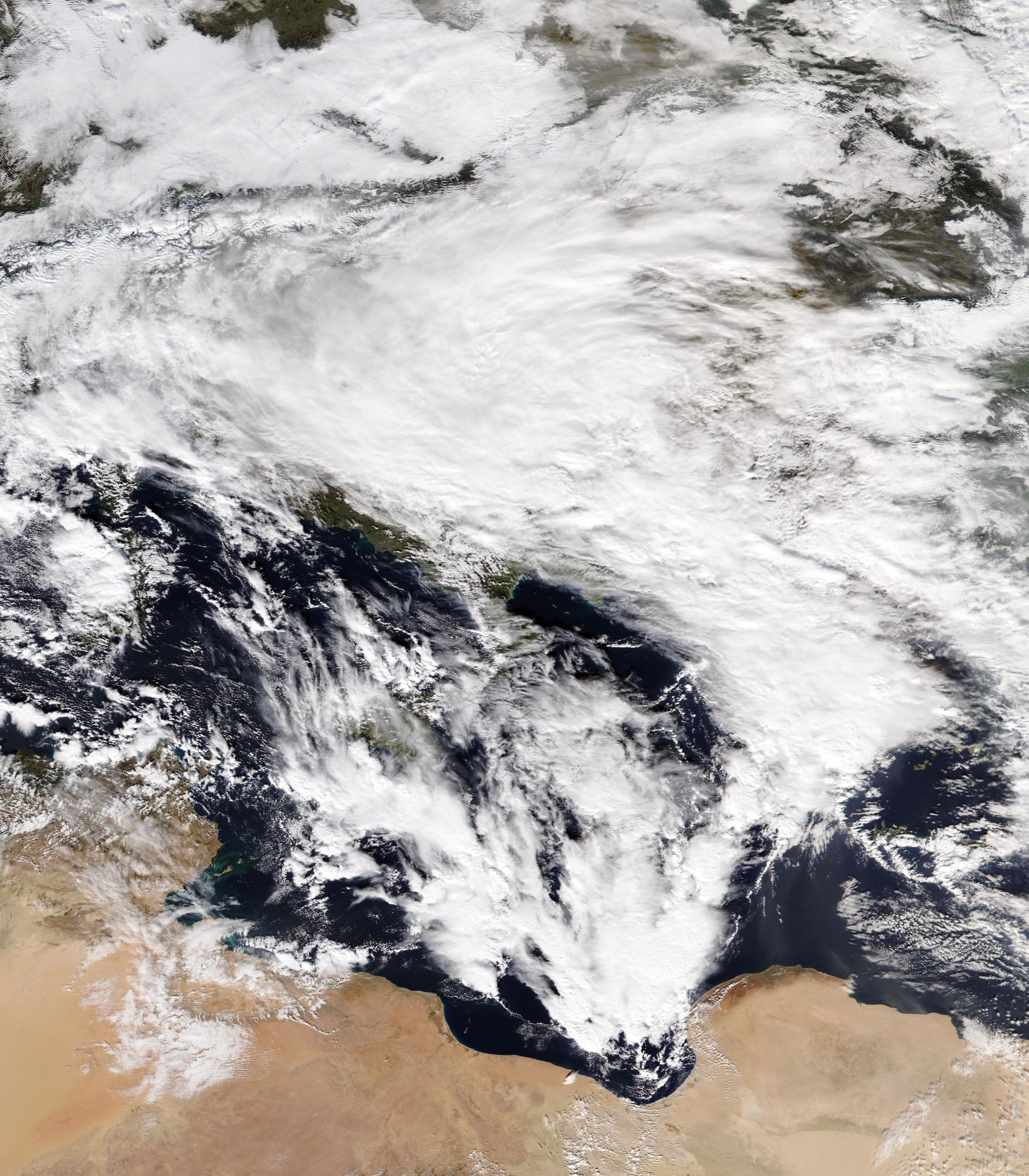

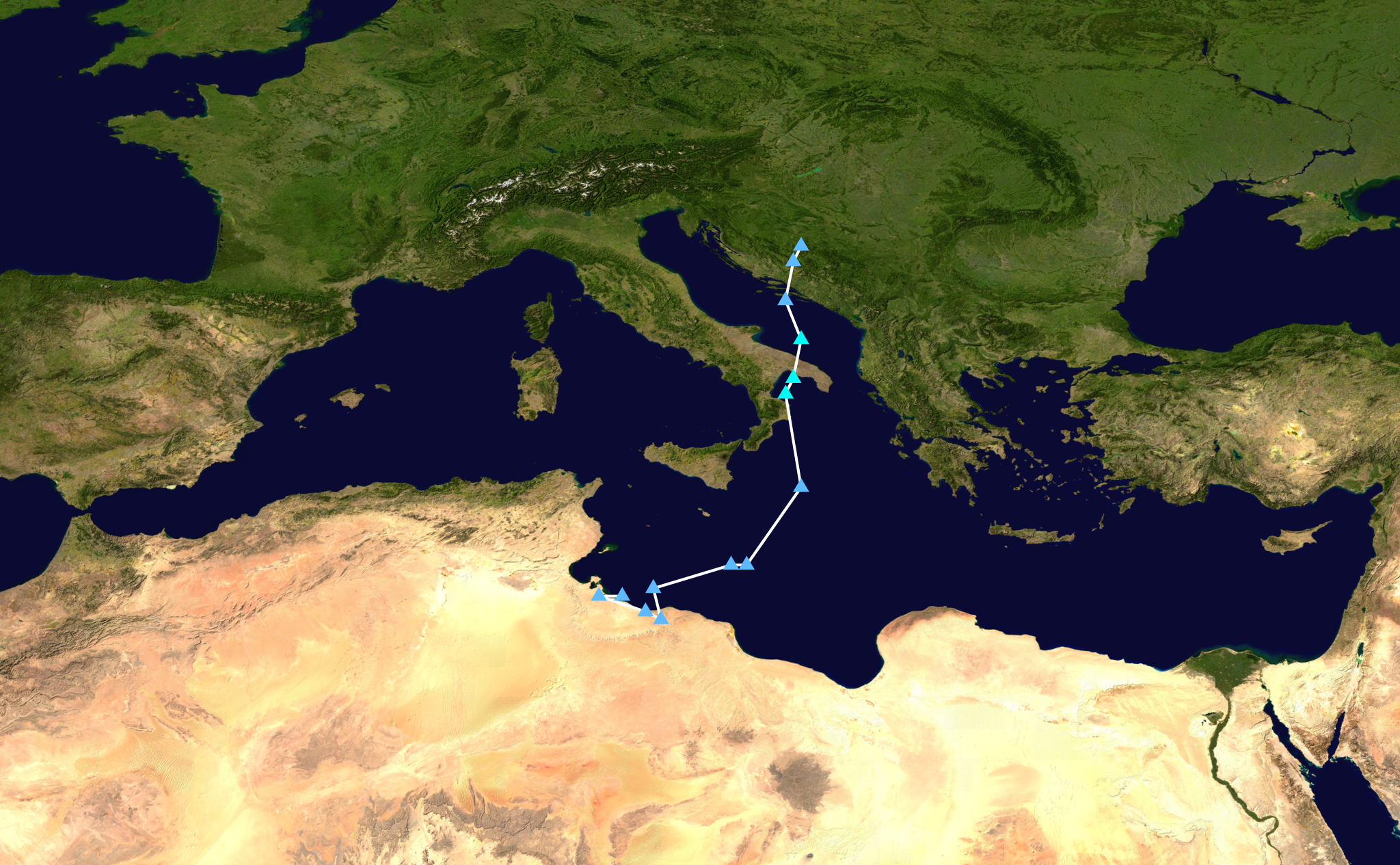
- Area affected: Italy, Austria, Croatia, Bosnia‑Herzegovina
- Date of impact: 3–5 December 2025
- Maximum wind gust: Unspecified
- Lowest pressure: 999 hPa (29.50 inHg)
- Fatalities: Unspecified
- Power outages: Unspecified

==== Date named and background ====
Named by the central Mediterranean group (Italy) and Dieter I by the Free University of Berlin, Cassio affected Italy, Croatia, and Austria. It brought heavy snowfall to the Dinaric Alps and high winds to the Adriatic coast.

==== Weather warnings issued ====
The highest Italian alerts included Red and Orange warnings for catastrophic flooding and landslides across Emilia-Romagna, Liguria, and Tuscany, which was forecast to cause widespread damage to infrastructure and necessitating evacuations.

==== Storm impacts ====
The influence of Cassio extended across the Adriatic Sea to Croatia. While Italy's alerts focused on flooding, Croatia's national service (DHMZ) issued high-level warnings, typically Orange or Red alerts for the Adriatic Coastal regions and Dalmatia. These warnings primarily targeted strong, gale-force winds (Bura or Jugo) and coastal marine hazards, which is expected to cause significant travel disruption, ferry cancellations, and dangerous wave conditions along the exposed coastline.

=== Storm Byron (Dieter II) ===
Storm Byron
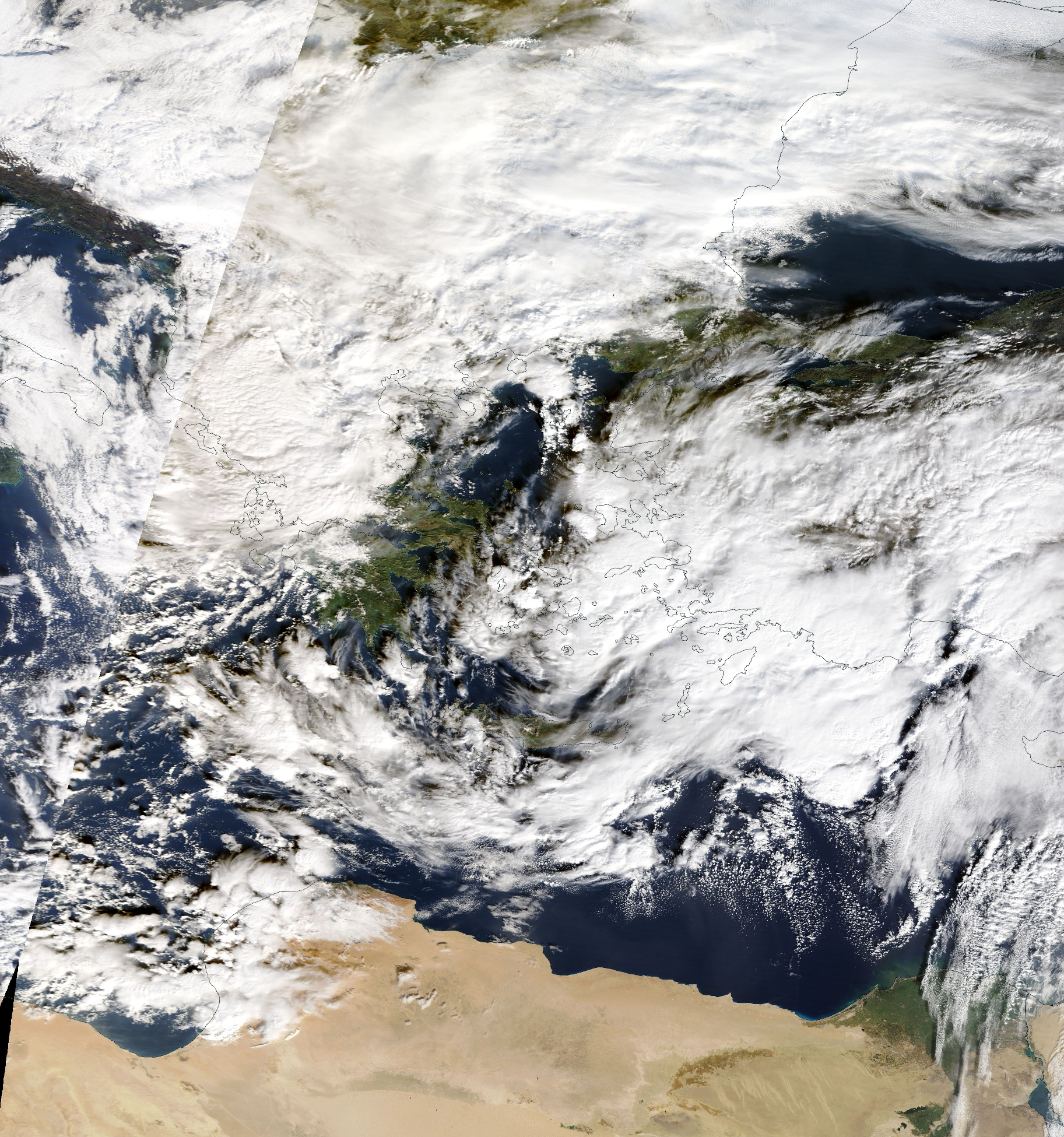

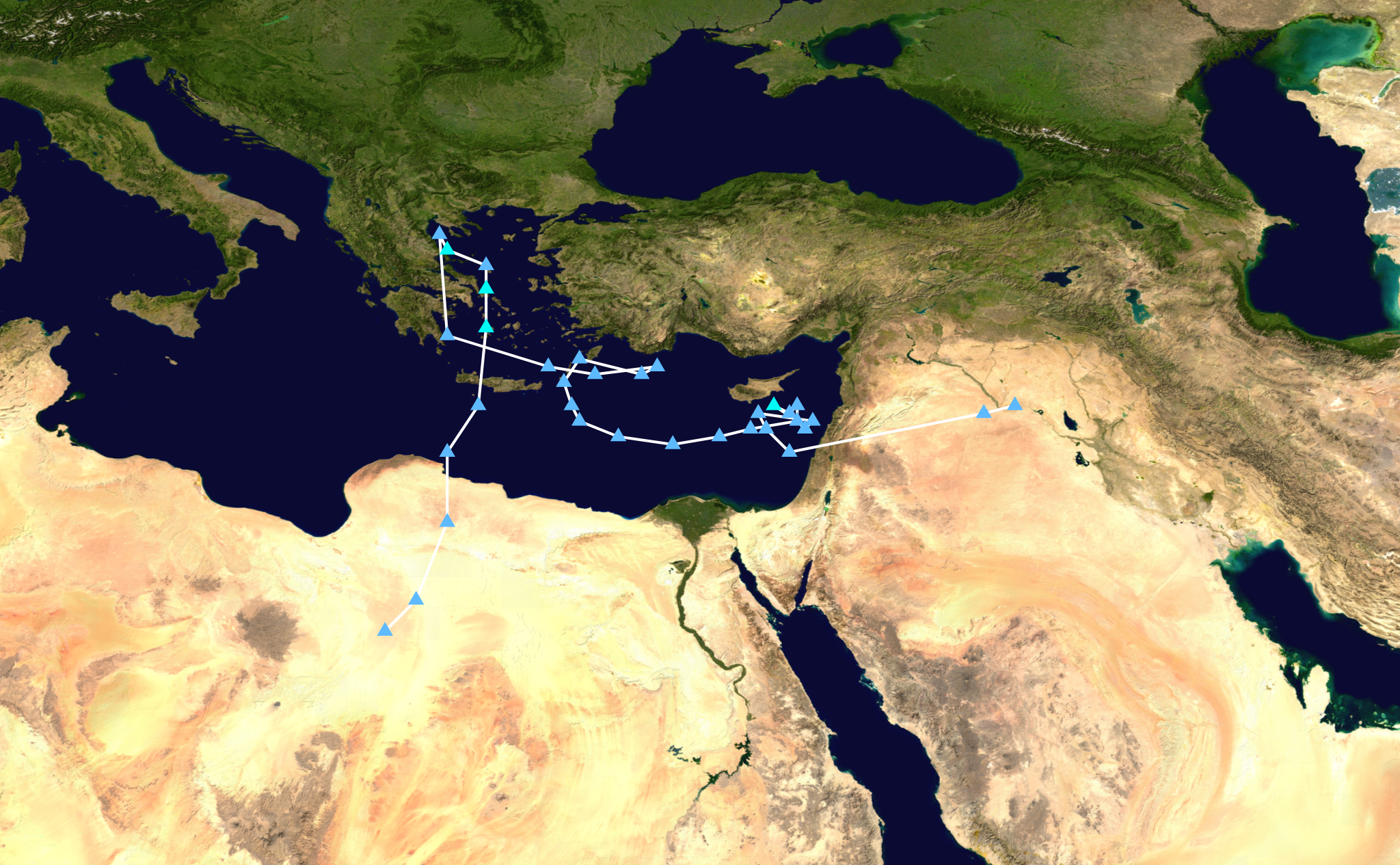
- Area affected: Greece, Cyprus, Israel, Gaza, East Jerusalem
- Date of impact: 4–9 December 2025
- Maximum wind gust: Unspecified
- Lowest pressure: 1,000 hPa (29.53 inHg)
- Fatalities: 18+
- Power outages: Unspecified

==== Date named and background ====
Byron or Biron was named by the eastern Mediterranean group (Greece). It primarily affected Greece, Cyprus, and Israel. The system brought significant precipitation to the Levant, causing flooding in Gaza and East Jerusalem. It was also named Dieter II by the Free University of Berlin.

==== Weather warnings issued ====
In anticipation of the storm's extensive impact, the General Secretariat for Civil Protection in Greece issued a "Red Code" mobilization—the highest state of alert—for at least ten regional units, including Attica (Greater Athens), Thessaly, the Peloponnese, and numerous islands in the Aegean. As a preventative measure, authorities ordered the closure of all public and private schools across all educational levels on 5 December, in high-risk areas, including the capital and islands like Rhodes and Santorini. Citizens in affected areas were strongly advised to restrict movement to essential travel and avoid basements or underground parking areas due to the high risk of flash flooding. Shipping routes in the Aegean Sea faced disruption and cancellations due to the forecast of wind speeds reaching up to 9 on the Beaufort scale. A yellow rain warning was issued for all of Cyprus with 55 millimetres per hour, meaning total accumulation will likely exceed 55 millimetres over 24 hours, posing a significant risk of flash flooding.

==== Storm impacts ====
Byron caused flooding in the Gaza Strip and left at least 14 people dead, including three children. At least 12 buildings already damaged due to Israeli bombing during the Gaza war partially collapsed in the territory.

=== Storm Davide (Elias) ===
Storm Davide
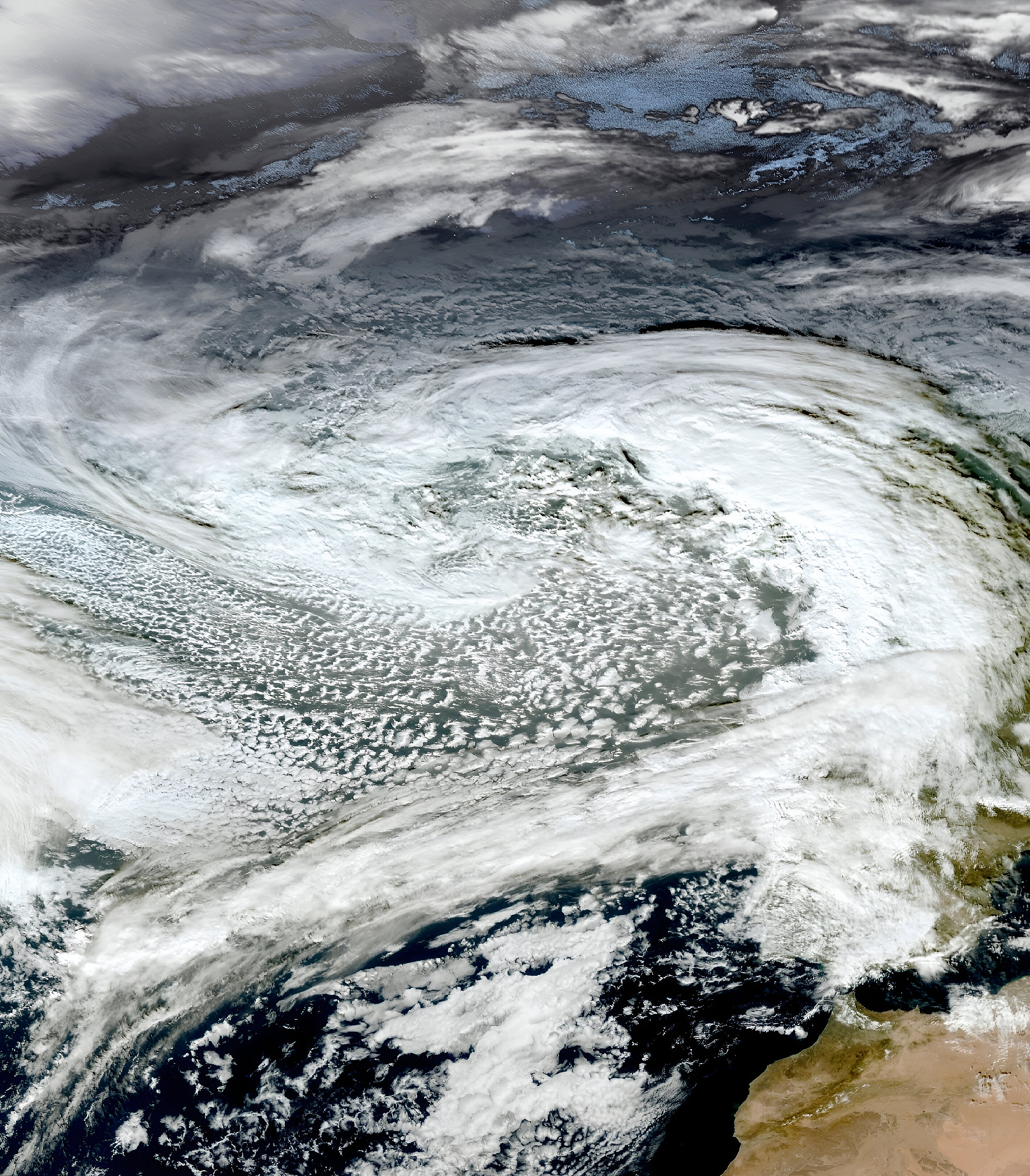

- Area affected: United Kingdom, France, Ireland
- Date of impact: 5–7 December 2025
- Maximum wind gust: Unspecified
- Lowest pressure: 965 hPa (28.50 inHg)
- Fatalities: Unspecified
- Power outages: Unspecified

==== Date named and background ====
Named by the south-western group on 5 December 2025, Davide (Elias in Germany) brought further wind and rain to France and the Iberian Peninsula. It maintained a period of high-impact weather across south-western Europe.

==== Weather warnings issued ====
On 5 December, it brought severe gales through the English Channel and Irish Sea causing yellow warnings for wind for Ireland, Northern Ireland, northern coasts of France. All of those areas, including southern English coasts were also under a force 9 severe gale warning.

==== Storm impacts ====
The North Wales coast, specifically from Llanddulas to the East coast of Anglesey and the North West coastline from the Menai Straits to Borth, was under a flood risk for two days due to a combination of high tides and adverse weather. Residents were urged to be careful near coastal paths, beaches, and estuaries. Simultaneously, the River Severn catchment area, from Newtown to the Severn-Vyrnwy Confluence, experienced expected flooding of low-lying land and roads following heavy rainfall that began on the afternoon of Friday 5 December 2025. River levels were elevated, impacting roads near areas like Cilcewydd, Welshpool, and Llandrinio.

Storm Davide had strong thunderstorms in its core due to a mix of very strong wind shear and strong pressure changes. This brought hail and tornadic supercells on the night of 5 December and into 6 December to southern counties of England. A tornado tracked through the town of Seaford in East Sussex at around 03:40 GMT on 6 December. The following TORRO analysis of the damage concluded that the tornado likely reached winds of over 95 mph (42 m/s; 83 kn; 153 km/h) and an intensity of T3 on the TORRO scale as it ripped several garage doors and roofs off along with several roof tiles along its track.

=== Storm Bram (Helmut) ===
Storm Bram
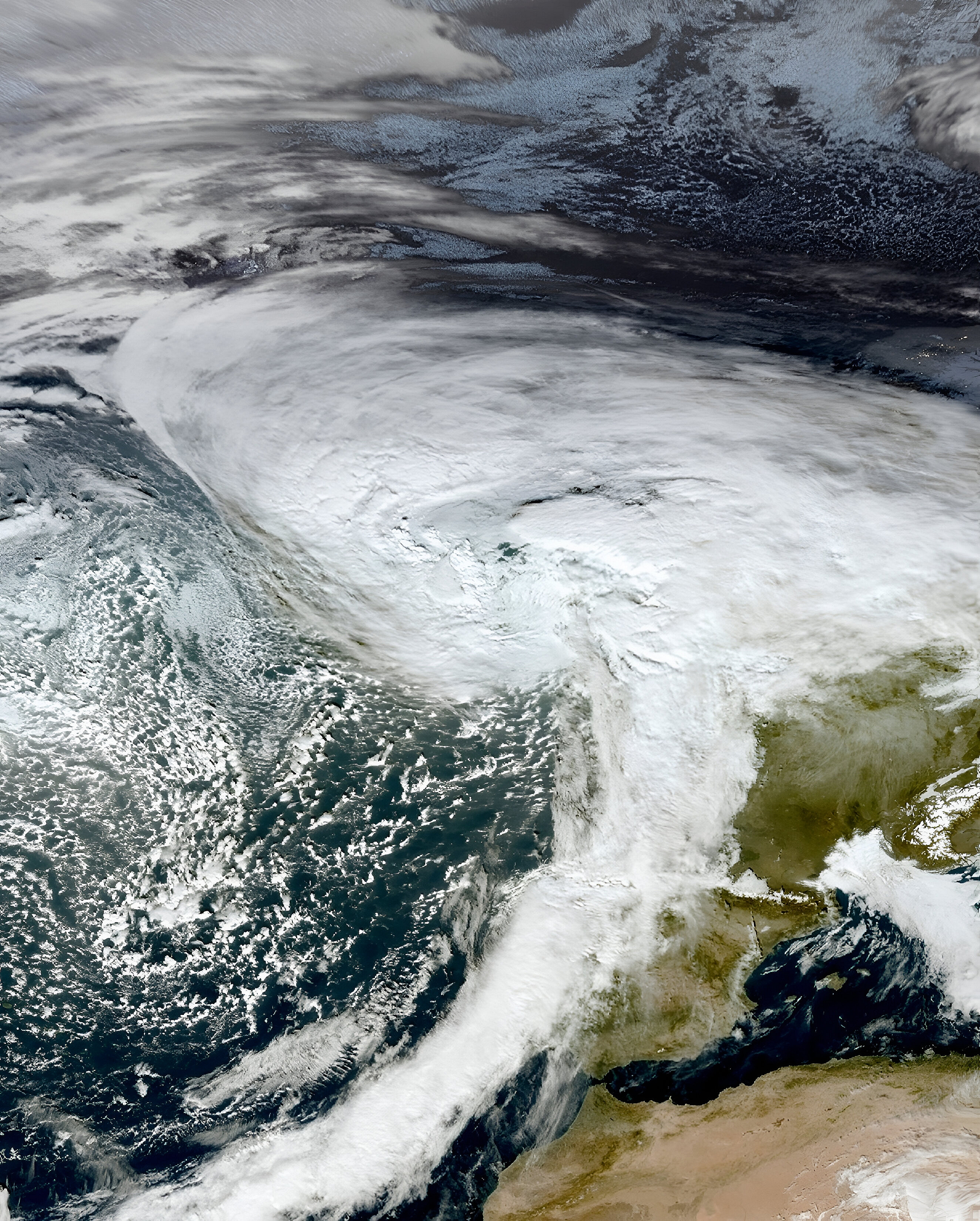

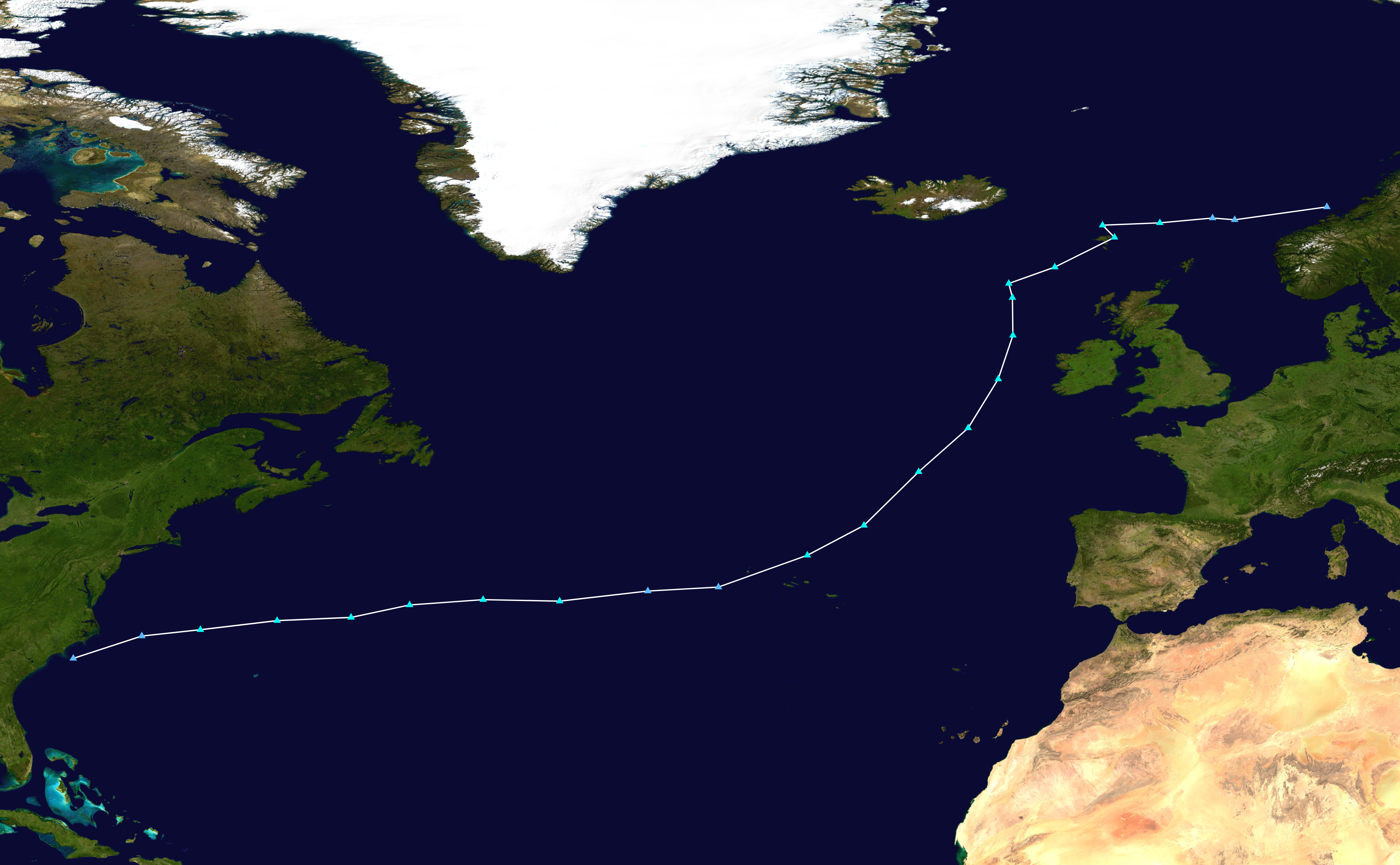
- Area affected: United Kingdom, Ireland
- Date of impact: 8–11 December 2025
- Maximum wind gust: 96 mph (43 m/s; 83 kn; 154 km/h) at Elgol, Scotland
- Lowest pressure: 959 hPa (28.32 inHg)
- Fatalities: Unspecified
- Power outages: Unspecified

==== Date named and background ====
Named by the Met Éireann on 8 December, Bram, named Helmut by FUB, was the second storm of the season for the western group. It tracked across the UK and Ireland, producing significant wind gusts and travel disruption.

Storm Bram was an extra-tropical cyclone, of a specific kind called a Shapiro-Keyser Cyclone.

==== Weather warnings issued ====
Warnings were issued across the regions, including Amber Wind Warnings for northwest Scotland and Amber Rain Warnings for areas in south Wales and Devon. Ireland's Met Éireann also put Status Orange wind warnings in place for multiple coastal counties. The primary concern was the combination of extreme elements. Wind gusts were forecast to reach upwards of 90 mph (40 m/s; 78 kn; 140 km/h) in exposed coastal areas of Scotland, while widespread winds of 50–70 mph (22–31 m/s; 43–61 kn; 80–113 km/h) impacted the rest of the UK. Heavy rainfall was recorded, with some areas in south Wales and southwest England receiving up to 100 mm (3.9 in) of rain. These intense conditions caused severe disruption. The high wind and rain led to significant travel issues, with rail speed restrictions and widespread delays across air and ferry services. Due to the high rainfall on saturated ground, the storm increased the risk of flooding and local power cuts in many affected areas. At around 17:00 GMT on 8 December, a red warning over the Irish waters between Loop Head and Malin Head was issued as force 11 violent storm force winds were expected between 12:00 and 23:30 GMT on 9 December. At around 21:00 GMT, this red warning was extended southwards to Mizen Head, and pushed forward to 09:00 GMT. As well as this, the orange warnings were extended to cover the majority of the whole of Ireland at the same time. By 08:00 GMT on 9 December, the red warnings were further extended all the way around the coast to Carnsore Point and the orange warnings were extended over the rest of Ireland and most of Northern Ireland.

==== Storm impacts ====
White Barrow in Devon, recording 111.5 mm (4.39 in) of rainfall, Treherbert in Glamorgan had 83.8 mm (3.30 in), just ahead of Dartmoor (81.2 mm or 3.20 in) and Princetown (79.4 mm or 3.13 in) in Devon. Flights and trains were cancelled throughout Tuesday, and hundreds of properties left without power. The M4 Prince of Wales Bridge in Gloucestershire was not due to reopen until 06:00 due to emergency roadworks to allow for the removal of 35 faulty lighting columns at risk of collapse, which could've been impacted by the strong winds and heavy rain from Bram. Due to strong winds, the A66 in County Durham/Cumbria is closed to high-sided vehicles between the A1M (Scotch Corner) and M6 (Penrith). The A19 Tees Flyover was also closed. In Greater Manchester, the M66 southbound was closed for water clearance. For rail, Scotland's routes face ongoing disruption. Several routes closed by Storm Bram, including Fort William to Mallaig and Dingwall to Kyle of Lochalsh, require daylight inspection for damage before reopening.

=== Storm Emilia (Jonathan) ===
Storm Emilia
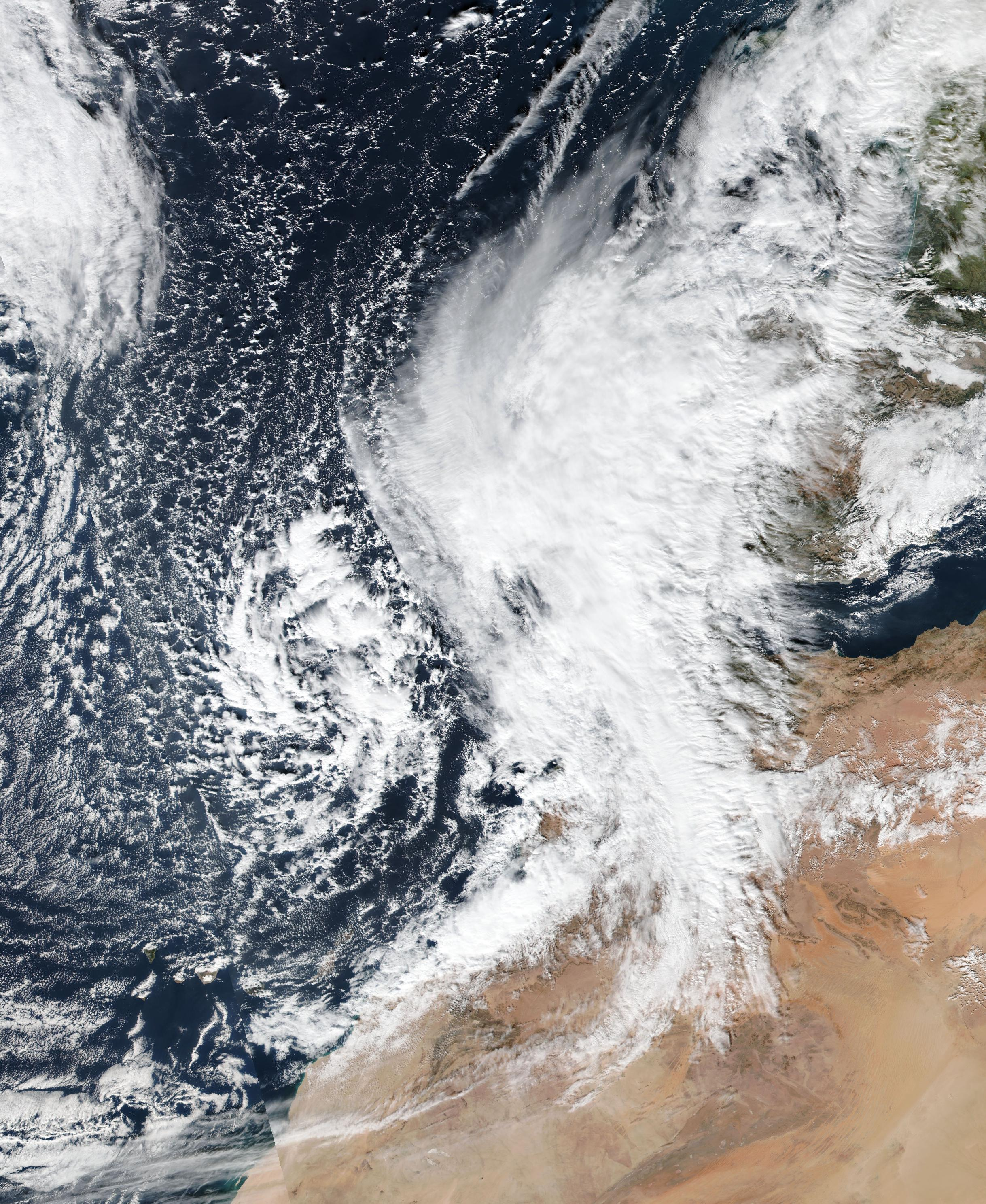

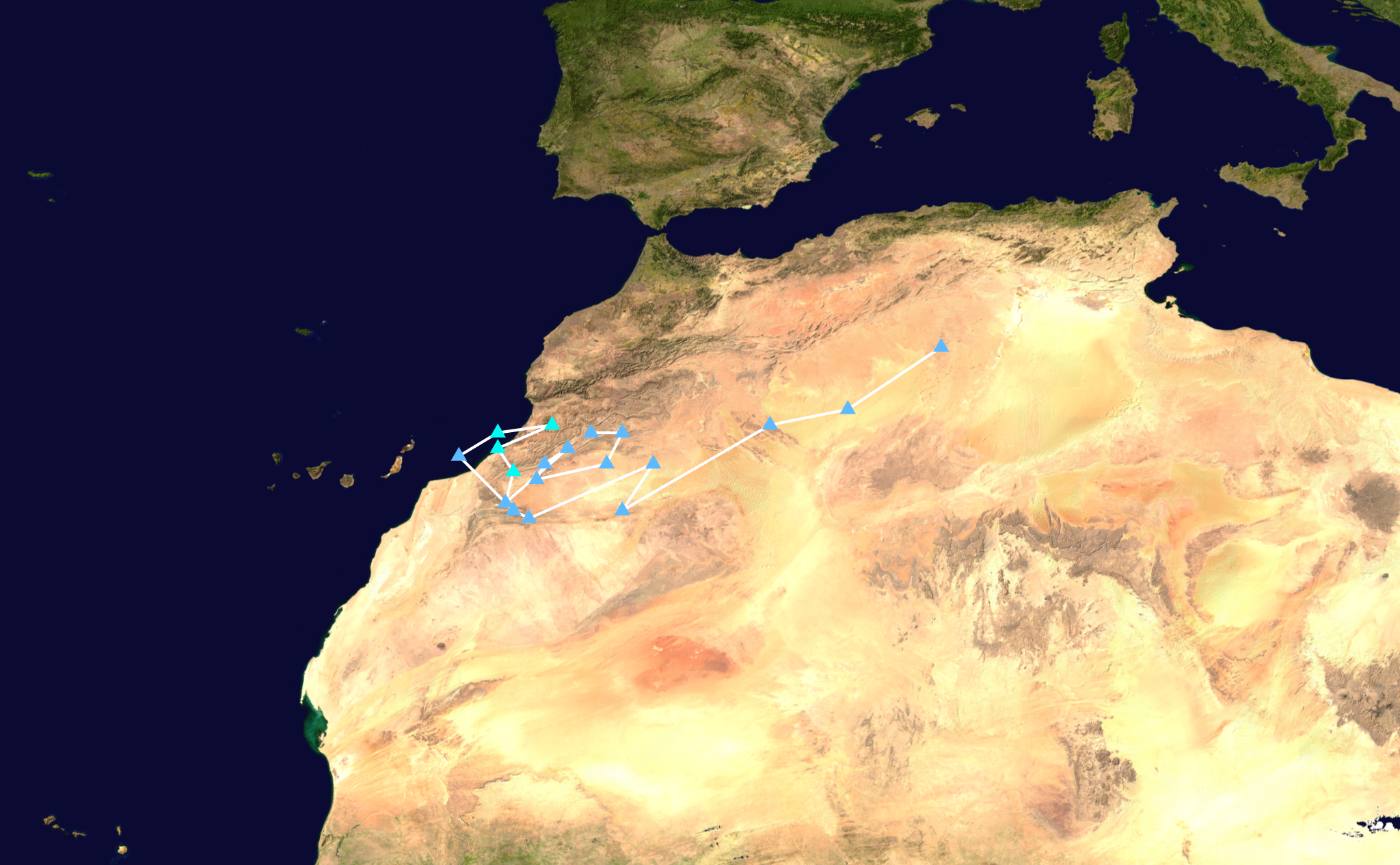
- Area affected: Spain, Canary Islands, Portugal, Morocco
- Date of impact: 11–15 December 2025
- Maximum wind gust: 98 mph (44 m/s; 85 kn; 158 km/h) at Izaña, Canary Islands
- Lowest pressure: 1,007 hPa (29.74 inHg)
- Fatalities: 37+
- Power outages: Unspecified

==== Date named and background ====
Emilia, was named by the south-western group and Jonathan by FUB. It brought severe weather to the Iberian Peninsula, Canary Islands and Morocco.

==== Weather warnings issued ====
AEMET issued widespread Orange and Yellow alerts for Friday and Saturday across all Canary Islands due to severe conditions including high winds (up to 90 km/h, 25 m/s, 49 kn, 56 mph), heavy rain, snow, thunderstorms, and dangerous coastal conditions (waves up to 6–7 m or 20–23 ft).

The Spanish weather agency, AEMET, issued a Red Alert for the Valencia coastline due to the threat of torrential rain (over 250 mm or 9.8 in expected) from Storm Emilia, indicating an extreme risk of severe flash flooding and danger to life.

Morocco's weather authority has issued an Orange alert for heavy snowfall (up to 50 cm or 20 in) in Midelt, Ouarzazate, and Tinghir, along with significant snow (10–30 cm or 3.9–11.8 in) across several other regions, with rain and storms expected at lower altitudes (below 1,400 m or 4,600 ft) from Friday to Sunday.

==== Storm impacts ====
Storm Emilia caused catastrophic damage across the Canary Islands, Morocco, and Spain in mid-December 2025, resulting in at least 37 fatalities due to flash flooding in the Moroccan city of Safi. In the Canary Islands, emergency services responded to a record 2,225 incidents as the archipelago was battered by hurricane-force gusts of 98 mph (44 m/s; 85 kn; 158 km/h) at Izaña and waves exceeding 9 meters. The storm brought unusual heavy snowfall to the peaks of Tenerife and Gran Canaria, forcing the closure of Teide National Park, while torrential rains of up to 150 mm triggered mudslides and urban flooding across Murcia and Valencia on the Spanish mainland.

=== Storm Nils ===
Storm Nils
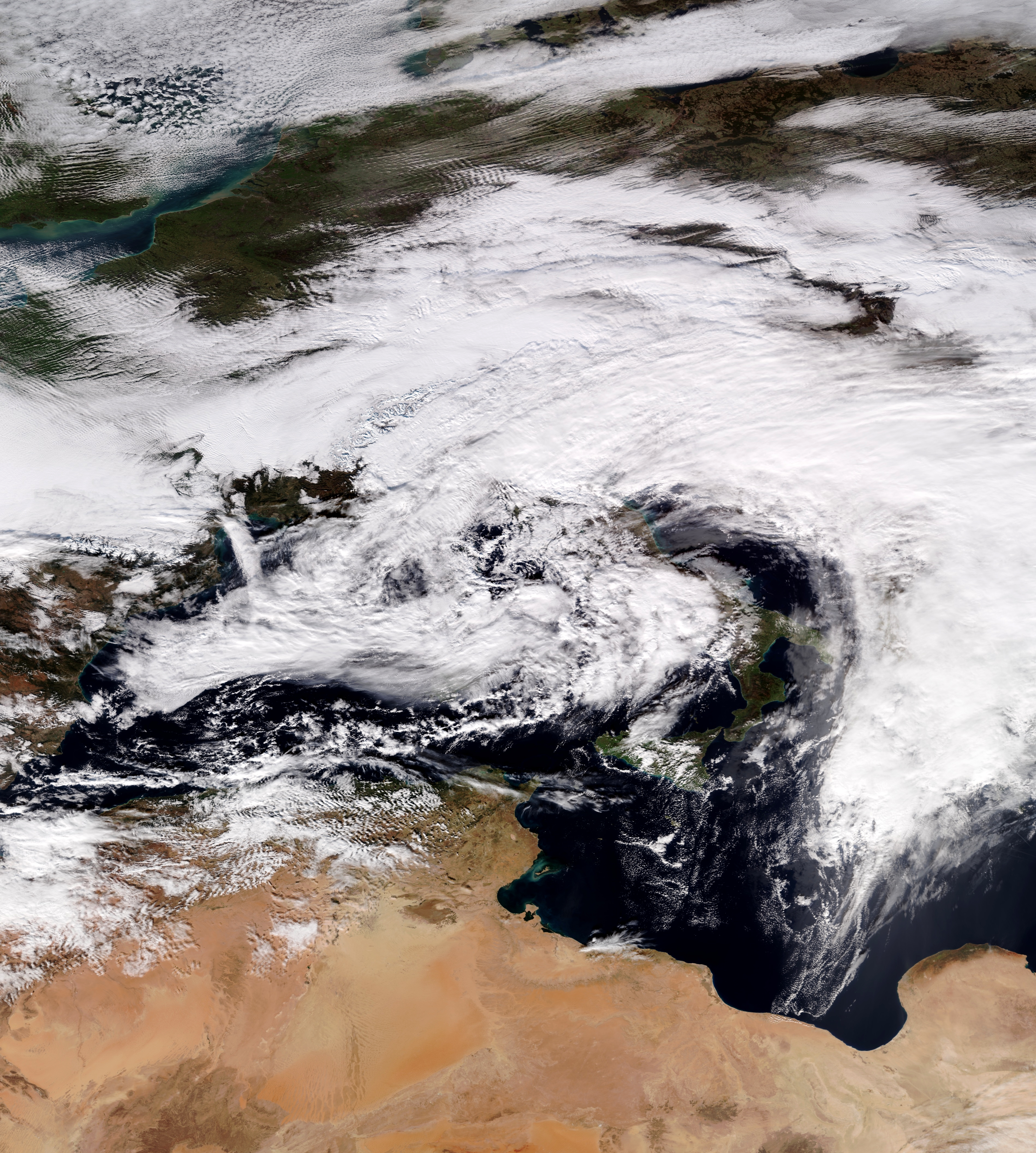

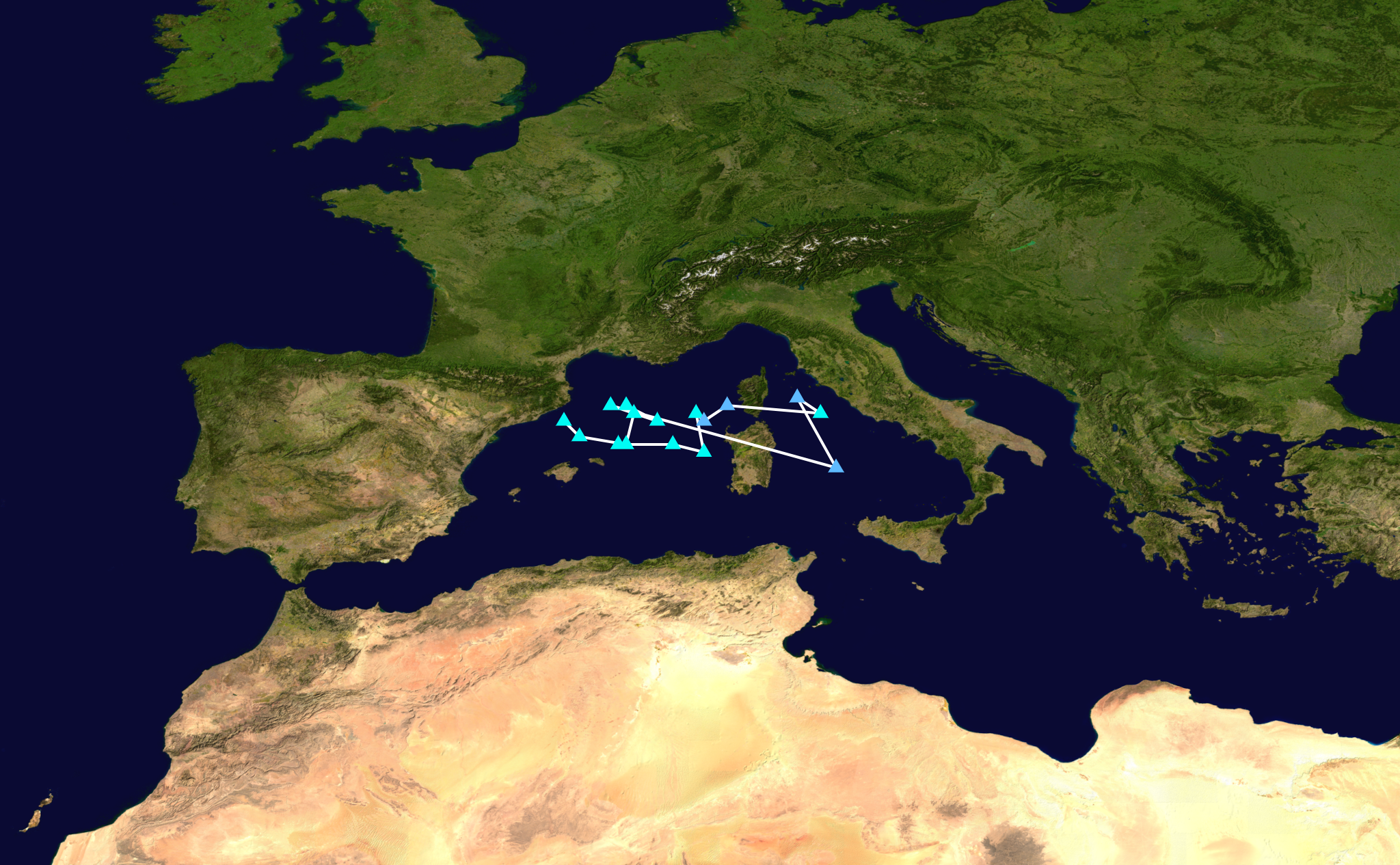
- Area affected: France, Spain, Italy, Croatia, Slovenia
- Date of impact: 20–26 December 2025
- Maximum wind gust: Unspecified
- Lowest pressure: 989 hPa (29.21 inHg)
- Power outages: Unspecified

==== Date named and background ====
Storm Nils was named by the Free University of Berlin on 20 December 2025. It originated as a low off the coast of the British Isles, then split into Nils II on 22 December and tracked into the Mediterranean.

==== Weather warnings issued ====
Orange warnings (Level 3) were active for high elevations in the Black Forest and Bavarian Alps, where wind gusts were expected to reach 80–100 km/h. These gale-force conditions are expected to persist through Christmas Eve, accompanied by additional hazards like freezing rain and icy roads.

This system throughout its life brought widespread orange warnings across Italy and other Mediterranean regions. On 24 December, locally strong winds and gales with strong gusts of 55‍–‍65 knots (100‍–‍120 km/h) were expected with peak gusts possibly up to hurricane force at 70 knots (130 km/h). This along with locally high waves were warned in both Croatia and Slovenia.

Multiple orange warnings were issued in Italy for heavy rainfall, along with heavy snowfall at altitudes above 300–400 meters expected between 12:00 UTC on 24 December until 06:00 UTC on 26 December. The warnings also warned coastal regions of strong gales up to 40‍–‍50 knots (75‍–‍90 km/h) and strong storm surges.

=== Storm Johannes (Peda) ===
Storm Johannes
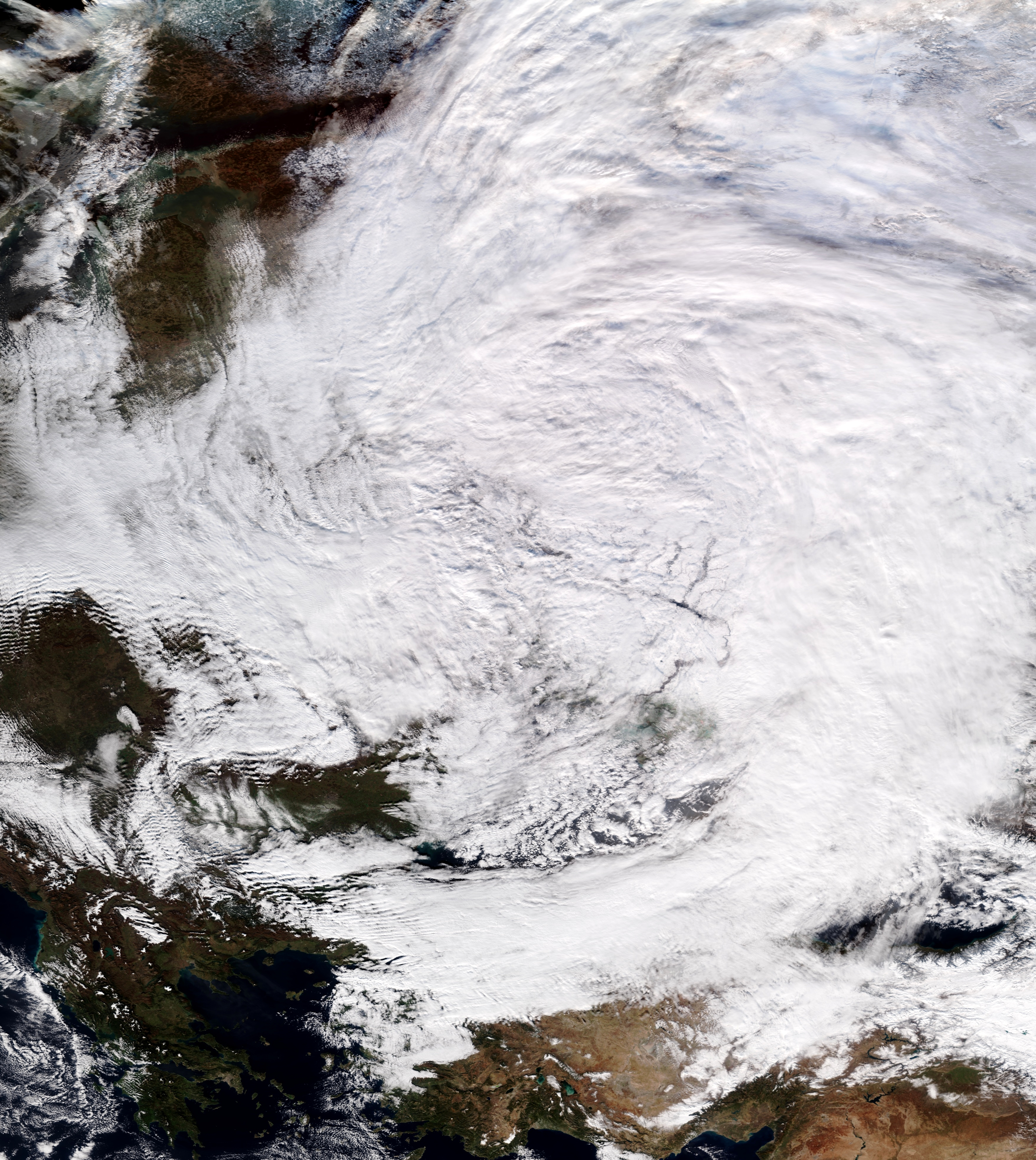

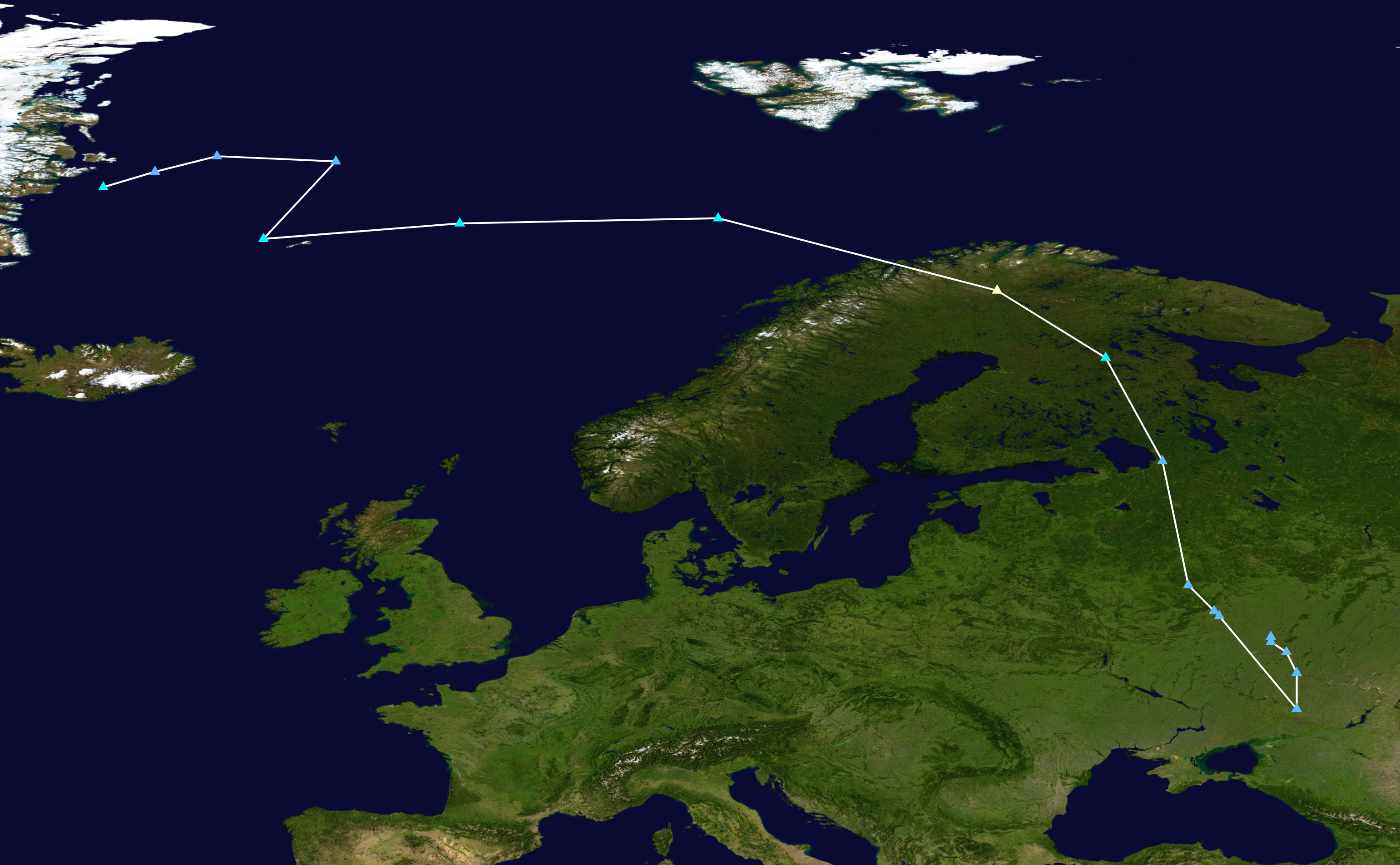
- Area affected: Norway, Sweden, Finland, Estonia, Latvia, Lithuania
- Date of impact: 26–29 December 2025
- Maximum wind gust: 97 mph (43 m/s; 84 kn; 156 km/h) at Vika, Norway
- Lowest pressure: 982 hPa (29.00 inHg)
- Fatalities: 3
- Power outages: 220,000+

==== Date named and background ====
Storm Johannes was named on 26 December 2025 by the Swedish Meteorological and Hydrological Institute (SMHI) as it began its track toward the Scandinavian Peninsula. Simultaneously, the Finnish Meteorological Institute (FMI) monitored the system under the name Hannes. The storm was a result of explosive cyclogenesis over the North Atlantic, with its central pressure dropping rapidly as it moved into the Norwegian Sea. Meteorologists recorded wind gusts reaching hurricane levels (up to 34 m/s) in the Swedish mountains.

==== Weather warnings issued ====
In Sweden, SMHI issued orange and yellow wind warnings for over half the country. On 27 December, the Swedish Transport Administration issued a public service announcement, urging residents in northern Dalarna, Gävleborg, Västernorrland, and Jämtland to stay off the roads. In Finland, FMI issued warnings for heavy snow and "dangerous" winds, predicting accumulations of up to 40 cm in Lapland. In Norway, authorities in the Nordland region reported over 200 emergency calls as they dealt with hurricane-force gusts.

==== Storm impacts ====
Sweden confirmed three deaths. A man in his 50s died after being hit by a falling tree near the Kungsberget ski resort. A man in his 60s died in Hofors from injuries sustained from a falling tree while working in a forest. Additionally, a utility worker in Härnösand died in a field accident while clearing debris. In Finland, outages peaked at over 180,000 households, particularly in the western regions. Sweden reported over 40,000 homes without power. At Kittilä Airport, strong winds pushed a Swiss Air passenger jet and a smaller aircraft off the runway into snowbanks; fortunately, there were no injuries. In Sweden, the Sundsvall Bridge and several major rail lines were closed. The Gävle Goat (Gävlebocken) collapsed on 27 December due to the extreme wind gusts.

=== Storm Roman ===
Storm Roman
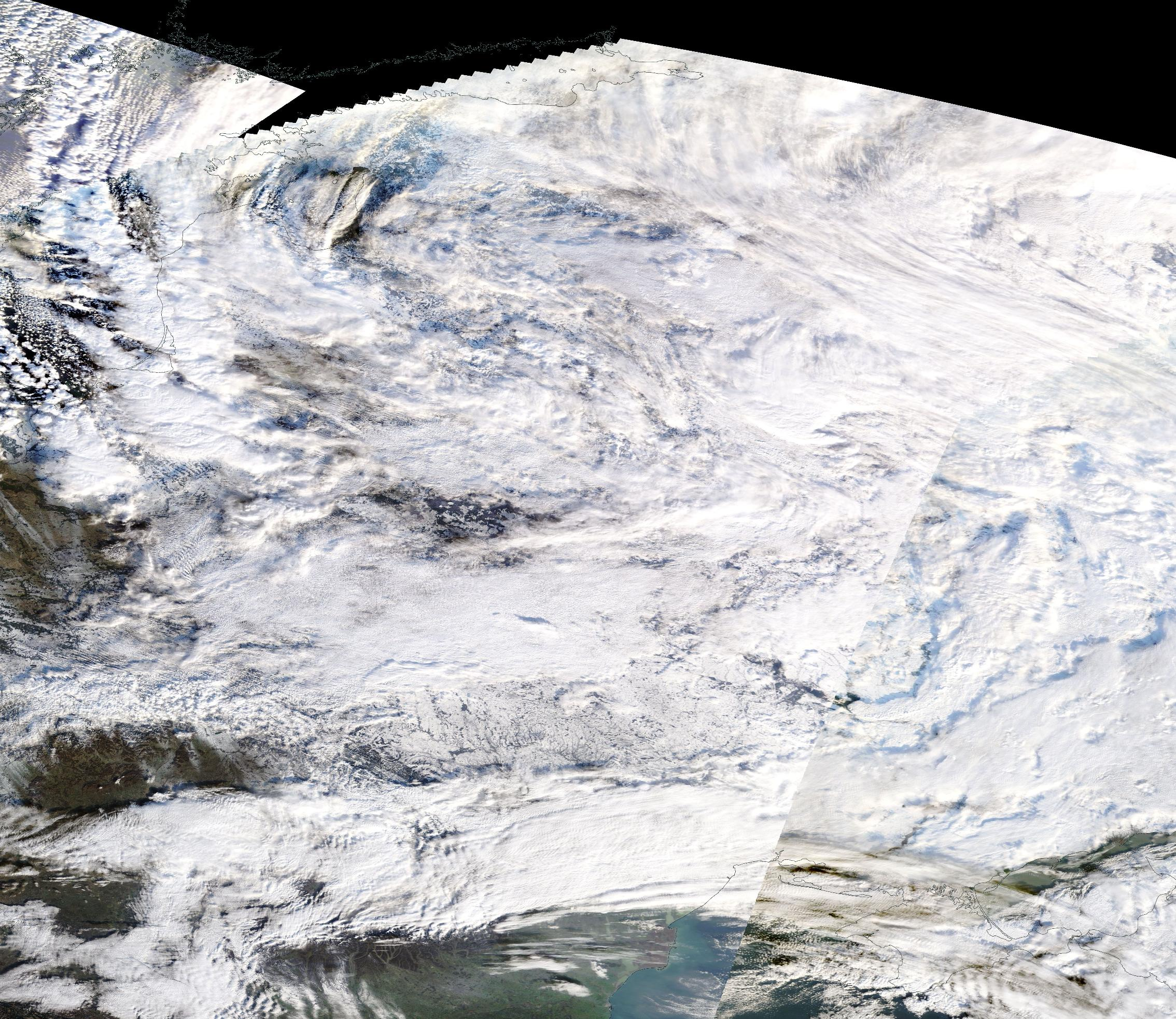

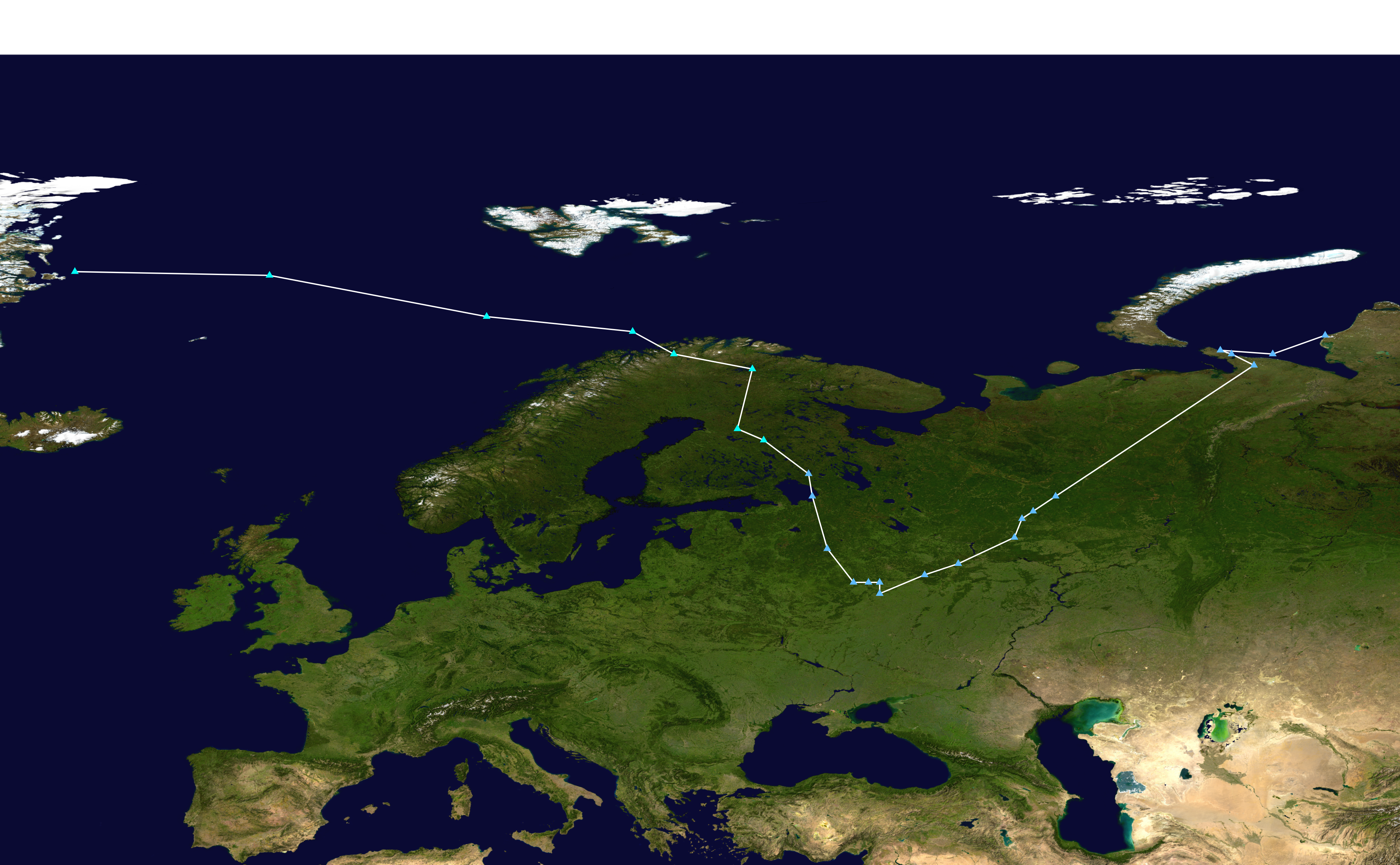
- Area affected: Norway, Sweden, Finland, Estonia, Latvia, Lithuania, Poland
- Date of impact: 27–31 December 2025
- Lowest pressure: 987 hPa (29.15 inHg)
- Fatalities: 1
- Power outages: Unspecified

==== Date named and background ====
Storm Roman was named by the Free University of Berlin on 27 December 2025. It was the second storm out of many in a line of polar storms that impacted Northeast Europe. This storm's name was officially adopted by Poland on 30 December instead of Germany as they had issued red warnings despite being in the same naming group.

==== Weather warnings issued ====
Severe gales and storm force gusts were forecast through the Baltic Sea and surrounding coastal regions on 29 and 30 December. Orange marine warnings and yellow coastal warnings remained in Sweden, Finland and the Baltics as gusts up to 25‍–‍30 m/s (55‍–‍65 mph) were expected. Wave heights also reached 3.0‍–‍5.5 m widely.

Orange and red warnings were issued in Poland due to very heavy snowfall along with storm force gusts in coastal regions on the 30 and 31 December. It stated that 20‍–‍40 cm of snow could fall in some places with up to 60 cm on higher ground. All this whilst being accompanied by 90‍–‍100 km/h (55‍–‍60 mph) gusts. This caused widespread orange warnings for strong blizzards being issued throughout the country.

==== Storm impacts ====
The blizzard conditions may have contributed to a fatal accident on an expressway in northeastern Poland. A passenger car collided with a truck near the central Polish village of Złotoria. Police said a female passenger in her 50s was killed, while two other occupants of the car were taken to the hospital.

=== Storm Anna (Tizian) ===
Storm Anna
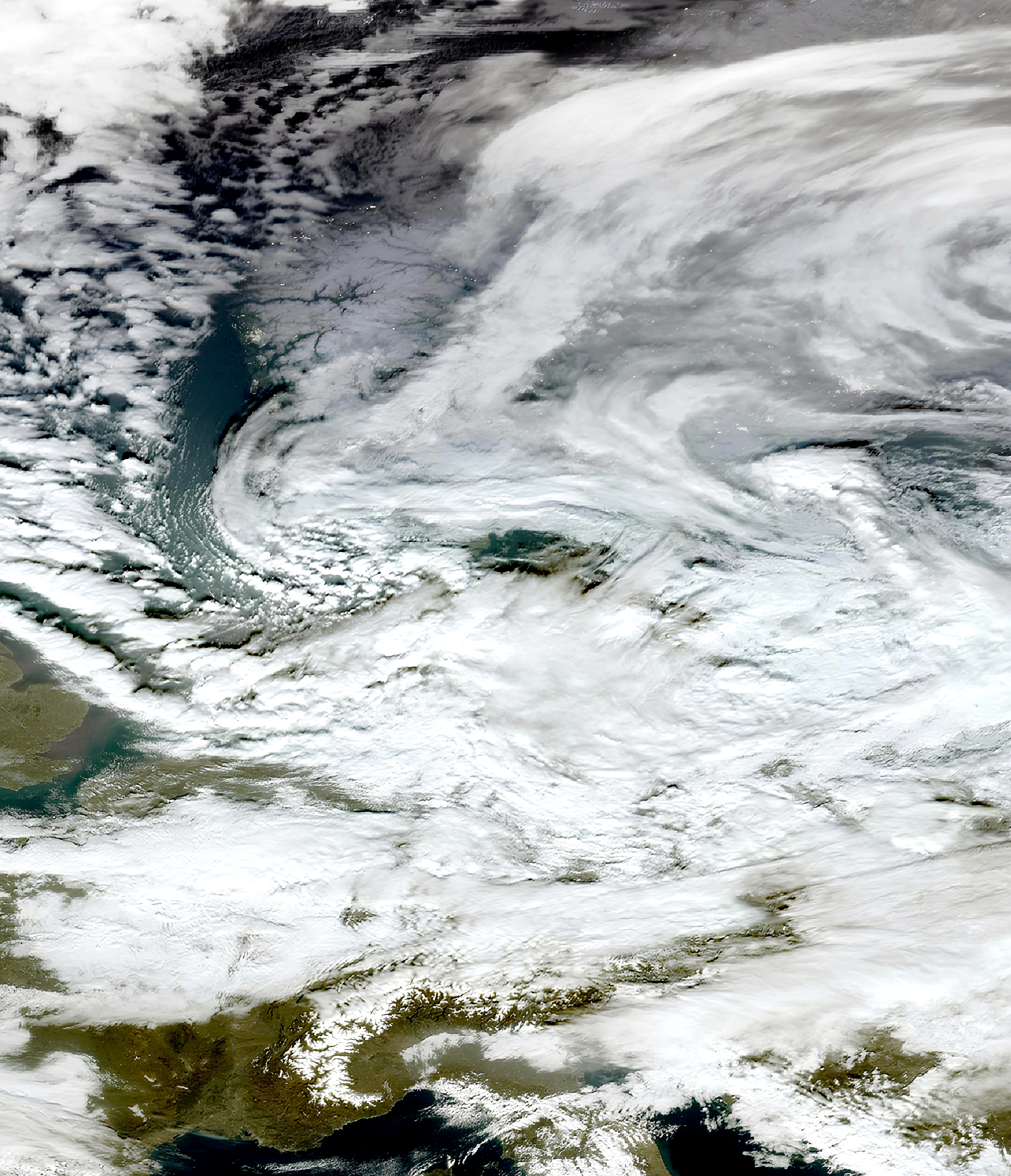

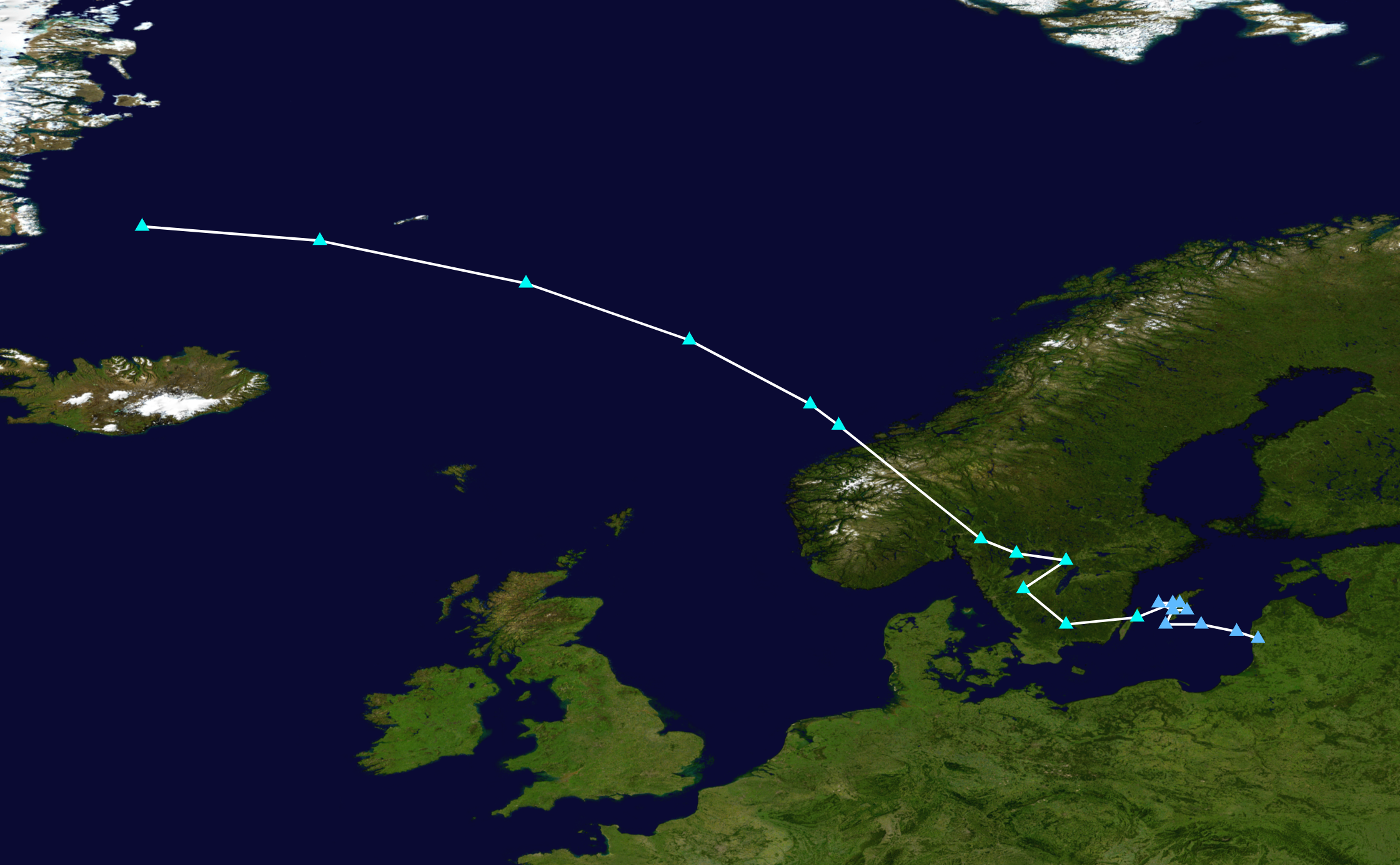
- Area affected: Norway, Sweden, Finland, Denmark, Germany, Benelux, the Baltics, United Kingdom
- Date of impact: 30 December 2025 – 5 January 2026
- Maximum wind gust: Unspecified
- Lowest pressure: 971 hPa (28.67 inHg)
- Fatalities: Unspecified
- Power outages: Unspecified

==== Date named and background ====
Storm Anna was named by the Swedish Meteorological and Hydrological Institute (SMHI) on 31 December 2025, it is a historically significant weather event as it is the first storm to be named under the northern group's unified naming list. It was also named Tizian by the Free University of Berlin two days prior. This was the third and strongest of a line of polar lows to impact this region within a one-week timespan.

==== Weather warnings issued ====
For Gävleborg County is a Red Warning. Orange warnings issued for Southern Gästrikland and Northern Uppland. Forecasters warned of heavy snowfall combined with windy conditions, predicting 20–40 cm (2–4 dm) of snow locally. Expected impacts include power outages, telecommunication disruptions, and dangerous road conditions due to drifting snow. A Yellow warning was issued for Eastern Svealand and parts of Central Sweden. This covers heavy morning snowfall (7–15 cm) and strong gusts, which are expected to cause significant delays in public transport and hazardous driving conditions. Authorities have urged the public to reconsider travel on New Year's Day, warning that "rescue vehicles may struggle to get through" and that vehicles are likely to become stuck in drifting snow.

==== Storm impacts ====
Storm Anna caused widespread chaos at Amsterdam Airport Schiphol, particularly on 2 January 2026, where a combination of heavy snow and shifting crosswinds led to the cancellation of over 325 flights and delayed more than 635 others. The disruption at Schiphol hit KLM and easyJet hardest, with KLM alone cancelling roughly 30% of its schedule due to the airport's reduced runway capacity. The storm brought wind gusts of up to 90 km/h along the northern coast of the Netherlands. These high winds caused secondary issues, such as the suspension of ground handling operations and de-icing procedures at major airports when wind speeds became too dangerous for ramp workers.

In Sweden, meteorologists recorded extreme accumulations, with up to 50 centimetres (nearly 20 inches) of snow falling in parts of central Sweden on New Year's Day and 2 January, leaving thousands of households without power. In the Netherlands and Germany, the storm's tail end brought freezing rain and black ice, leading to hazardous road conditions and the deployment of specialized snow removal equipment like the Lavastorm truck on major highways. Meanwhile, in Poland, the storm's heavy snow paralyzed the S7 motorway, leaving hundreds of travelers stranded in sub-zero temperatures with traffic jams stretching up to 20 kilometres.

The Met Office issued Amber warnings for snow in northern Scotland. Forecasters warned of blizzard conditions caused by the storm's strong northerly winds, with accumulations expected to reach up to 40 cm (16 inches) on higher ground and 10–20 cm at lower levels. Major roads like the A93 and A939 due to impassable snow drifts.

=== Storm Francis (Ulli) ===
Storm Francis
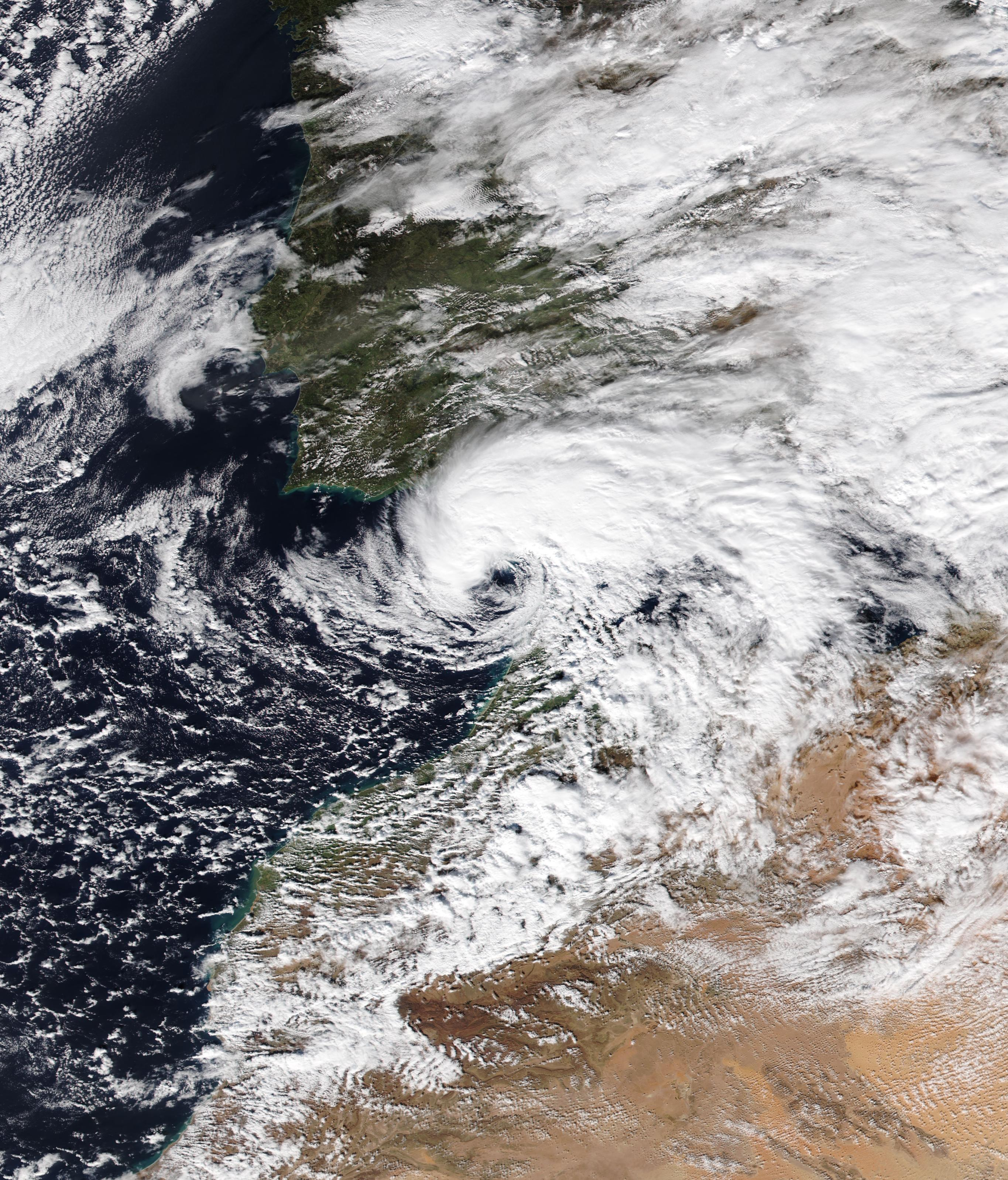

- Area affected: the Azores, Spain, Portugal, Morocco, Canary Islands, Algeria, Tunisia, Italy, Greece, Croatia, the Balkans, Moldova, Romania, Ukraine
- Date of impact: 31 December 2025 – 9 January 2026
- Maximum wind gust: 100 mph (45 m/s; 87 kn; 160 km/h)
- Lowest pressure: 980 hPa (28.94 inHg)
- Fatalities: 8
- Power outages: Unspecified

==== Date named and background ====
Storm Francis was an Atlantic windstorm that impacted the mid-Atlantic islands and South-western Europe in late December 2025 and in early January 2026. It was named by the Portuguese Met Office on 31 December 2025. It was also named Ulli by FUB.

==== Weather warnings issued ====
The Portuguese weather agency (IPMA) and the Spanish agency (AEMET) issued a wide range of warnings for Storm Francis, which is expected to bring a significant shift from dry, polar air to intense subtropical instability. In Madeira, the most severe conditions were anticipated, with Orange warnings rising to Red issued for the highlands and southern slopes due to persistent, heavy rainfall, hail, and thunderstorms, with wind gusts reaching up to 115 km/h. Across the Canary Islands, the regional government has declared alerts for rain and wind, while AEMET has specifically activated Yellow warnings for heavy rainfall and thunderstorms, particularly in Tenerife, Gran Canaria, and La Palma, where gusts of 80–90 km/h and rough seas with waves up to 4 meters are expected. On the Portuguese mainland, all districts are under Yellow warnings for New Year's Day as the storm's frontal systems bring heavy rain and maritime turbulence, while in Spain, widespread showers and high-altitude snow are forecast for the Andalucía region through the first weekend of the year.

The Moroccan General Directorate of Meteorology (DGM) issued Red Alerts—the highest possible warning level—for the provinces of Agadir Ida-Outanane, Taroudant, and Essaouira. These regions braced for extreme rainfall totals of up to 120 mm (4,700 thou) in 24 hours, raising the immediate risk of flash floods in low-lying valleys and "wadis" (dry riverbeds). In Algeria, coastal provinces were under orange alerts for both torrential rain and gale-force winds. The storm drove high waves against the northern shoreline, leading to the suspension of several maritime transport routes. Deep in the interior, the Atlas Mountains saw significant snow accumulation above 1,200 meters. These conditions made many mountain passes impassable, isolating several rural communities. The Italian Civil Protection has issued Orange and Yellow alerts across several regions. In the north, particularly around Trieste and the Adriatic coast, Orange Alerts are active for Wind and Snow, with "Bora" gusts reaching up to 150 km/h causing severe blizzard conditions. Central and Southern Italy are under Yellow Alerts for Rain and Thunderstorms. These warnings highlight the risk of localized flash flooding and landslides as the storm's center moves across the Mediterranean toward the coast.

The National Institute of Meteorology has issued Yellow Alerts for Rain and Wind. These warnings indicate that the weather is "potentially dangerous," with rainfall totals expected to reach 40 mm in the northwest. There is also a specialized Cold Wave Warning for the high-altitude regions of Jendouba and Siliana. This covers the risk of Snow and Ice, which is rare for the region and expected to disrupt local mountain transit.

In the Balkan region, warning levels have reached the maximum severity. Croatia and Montenegro have issued Red Alerts (the highest level) for Hurricane-force Winds, specifically the storm, which is gusting over 160 km/h. Slovenia and Bosnia are under Orange Alerts for Snow and Blizzards, with fresh accumulations exceeding 40–60 cm expected to cause a total standstill in transportation. Serbia remains under Yellow and Orange Alerts for Extreme Cold, as temperatures are recorded at 15 °C below the seasonal average. The HMIK issued flood warnings, for the west of Kosovo, and later the warnings were extended to most of Kosovo.

==== Storm impacts ====
Storm Francis hit the Canary Islands and Madeira first, with wind gusts peaking at 120 km/h (75 mph) in Tenerife. In the highlands of Madeira, the Portuguese weather agency (IPMA) upgraded warnings to Red as the storm delivered 115 km/h gusts and 4-meter swells, while La Palma recorded torrential rainfall exceeding 76 liters per square meter in just a few hours. As the storm moved from the Gulf of Cádiz toward the Mediterranean on 4 January, the snow level in Catalonia and the Ebro Valley was expected to start dropping toward 200 metres, with a risk of snow reaching sea level by Monday morning.

Storm Francis caused significant devastation across Southern Europe, leading to at least eight confirmed deaths and widespread destruction. In Spain, three people were killed in Andalusia—including a man whose van was swept away in Málaga and a young person on a motorbike in Granada—while the region faced record-breaking rainfall of up to 290 mm, collapsing bridges and forcing the evacuation of nearly 500 homes. In Portugal, the storm (identified as part of the same system) resulted in two deaths in the Setúbal district due to house flooding, alongside nearly 1,000 emergency incidents and massive power outages. Additionally, three fatalities occurred in Southwestern France as the storm's moisture turned into "black ice" upon meeting a polar air mass, causing lethal road accidents.

=== Storm Goretti (Elli) ===
Storm Goretti
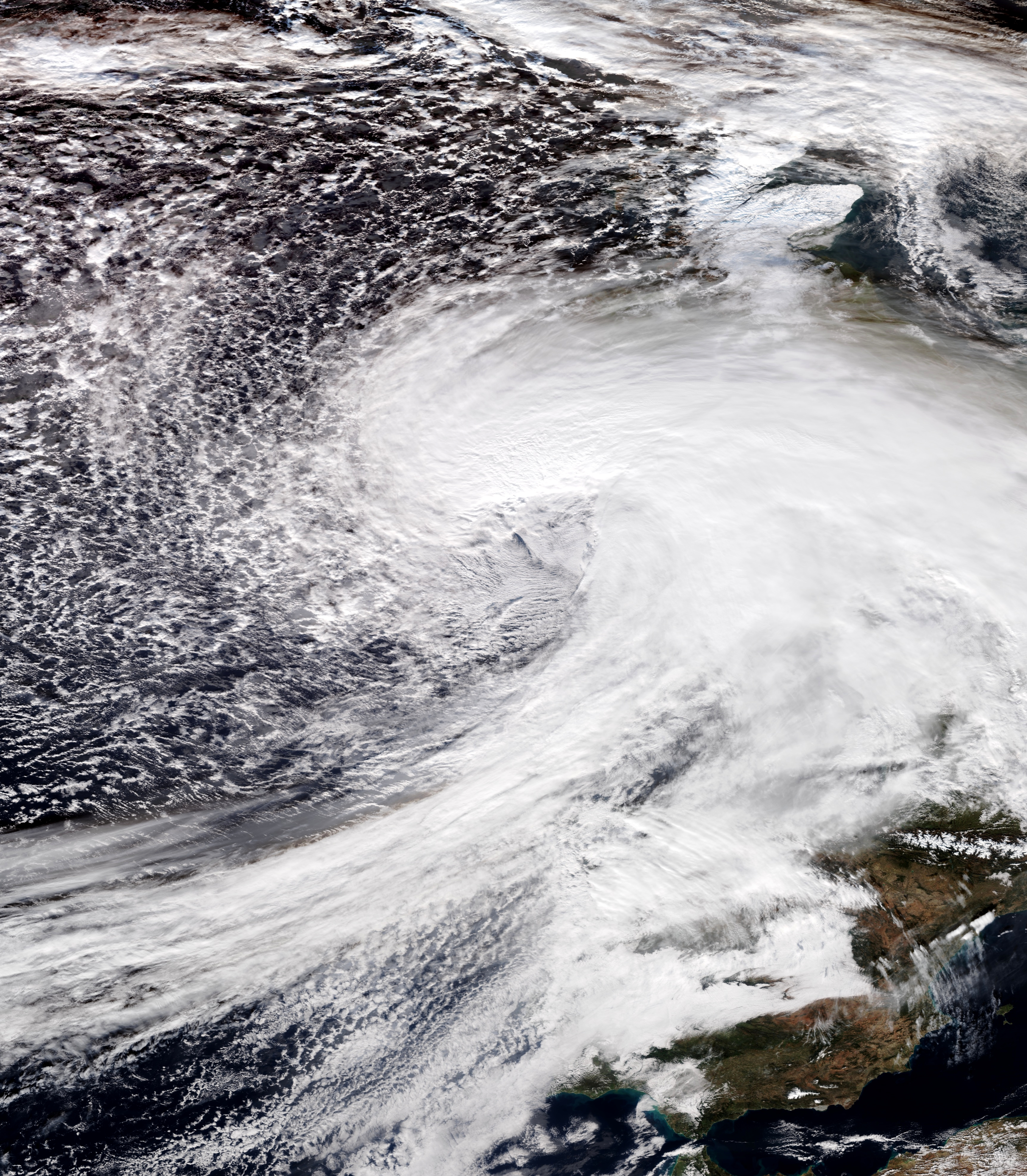
- Storm Goretti at 12:30 8 January 2026

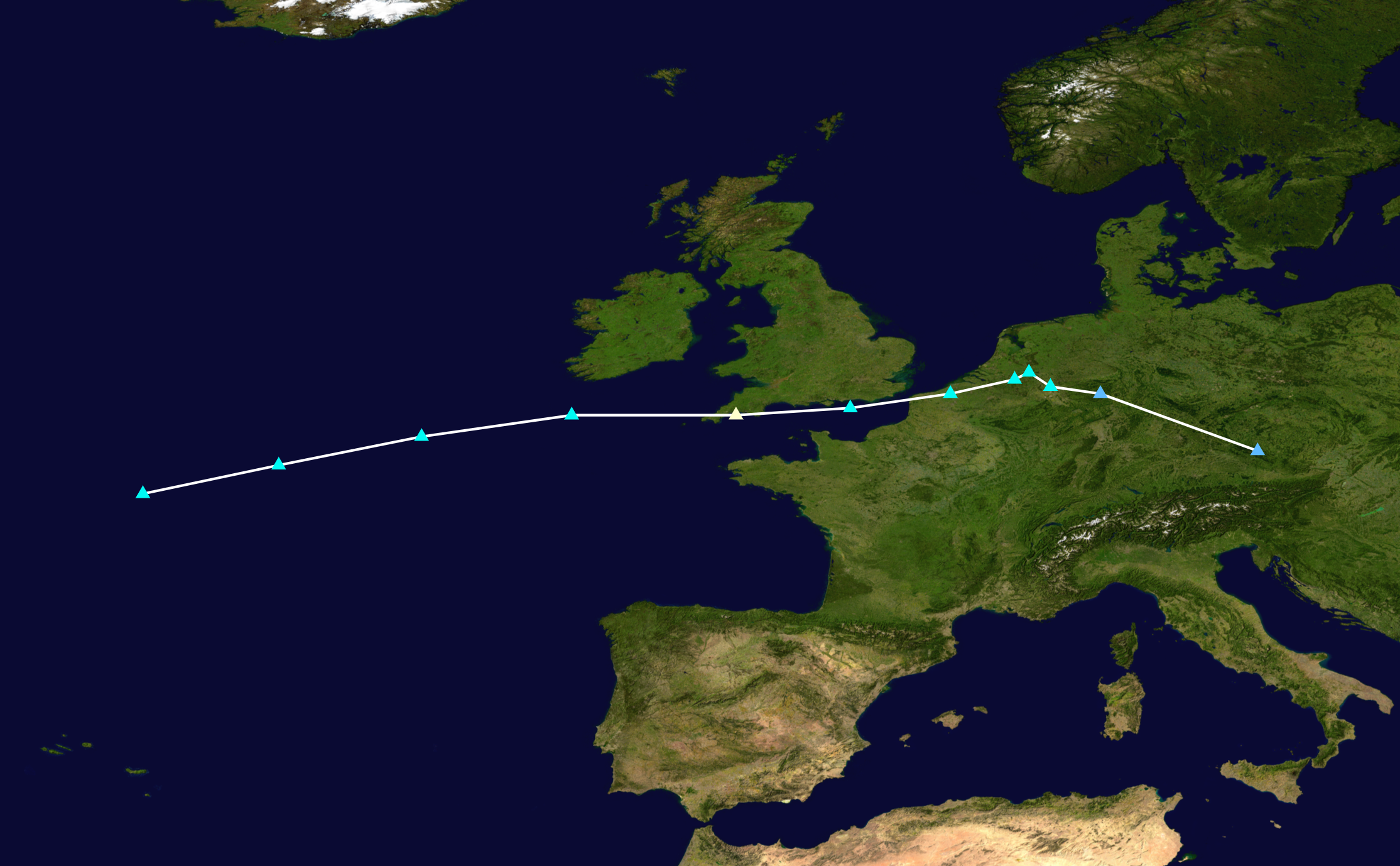
- Area affected: United Kingdom, France, Belgium, Netherlands, Germany, Spain (indirectly)
- Date of impact: 6–10 January 2026
- Maximum wind gust: 132 mph (59 m/s; 115 kn; 212 km/h) at Barfleur, Manche, France
- Lowest pressure: 969 hPa (28.61 inHg)
- Fatalities: 2 (1 indirect)
- Power outages: ~445,000+

==== Date named and background ====
Storm Goretti was named by Météo-France on 6 January 2026. and Elli by the Free University of Berlin the same morning. It originated in the Atlantic Ocean, and was expected to impact southern parts of the United Kingdom, as well as France and other countries in western Europe with strong winds, heavy rain and heavy snowfall, particularly on the northern side of the system.

==== Weather warnings issued ====
For the United Kingdom, the Met Office issued a broad yellow snow warning for the Midlands, where some areas, 5–10 cm of snow may settle with the potential for up to 20 cm (7 7/8 in) in some locations. A yellow wind warning was also issued for the south-west of England, specifically Cornwall. Within the warning area as Goretti pulls away, gusts of 50–60 mph (80–97 km/h) were likely but could reach 70 mph (110 km/h) around exposed headlands and coasts.

The warnings have been upgraded to amber in the Midlands and most of Wales for snow, which lasts from 8–9 January. There is also an additional warning upgrade to Amber in Cornwall due to wind, which lasts during 8 January. A yellow rain warning was also issued for eastern England, including The Fens, Lincolnshire, all of Norfolk and north Suffolk. 20–30 mm (3/4–1 1/8 in) rainfall is likely quite widely, with a small chance of 40–60 mm (1 5/8–2 3/8 in) in a few places, leading to the chance of some flooding and disruption. In addition, rain may turn to sleet or wet snow at times which may lead to some accumulations in places. Strong winds, especially near Norfolk & Suffolk coasts, will be an additional hazard with winds gusting 40–50 mph (64–80 km/h) at times and leading to large waves through Friday.

At 2pm on 8 January, Met Office issued a Red wind warning for the west of Cornwall including the Scilly Isles, Lands End, Truro, Falmouth, St Ives, Redruth/Camborne. Peak gusts of 80‍–‍100 mph or more were expected in exposed areas. A man died when a tree hit his caravan in Cornwall.

In the Channel Islands, Jersey and Guernsey are braced for Red-level wind threats with gusts potentially reaching 110 mph. Forecasted impacts include structural damage, uprooted trees, and coastal flooding during the Thursday night high tide; authorities have strongly advised residents to stay indoors from 8:00 PM Thursday until dawn Friday.

France issued Red Warnings for violent winds (the highest possible level), with gusts up to 140 km/h expected between Thursday night and Friday morning. Impacts include extreme danger from flying debris, widespread power outages, and a total halt to most transportation.

For 8–9 January 2026, Météo-France has issued Orange alerts for violent winds and snow/ice across the northern half of France, including Brittany, Normandy, and the Paris region. Storm Goretti is forecasted to bring extreme gusts of 120–140 km/h (75–87 mph) to the English Channel coasts and up to 100 km/h (62 mph) inland, posing a high risk of falling trees and power outages. Simultaneously, heavy snowfall of 5–15 cm (2–5 7/8 in) is expected to cause major disruptions to SNCF rail services, grounded flights at major airports, and treacherous "black ice" on roads. Yellow alerts for coastal flooding also apply to northern shorelines due to high waves and storm surges.

The German Meteorological Service DWD issued an orange warning for strong winds in the north and southwest for gusts up to 100 km/h. A red warning was issued for elevated regions of Black Forest for gusts up to 130 km/h. An orange warning for strong snowfall of up to 15 cm was issued for Northern Germany, locally up to 30 cm are expected. A red warning for strong snowfall and snowdrifts was issued for parts of Lower Saxony, Bremen, Hamburg, Schleswig-Holstein, Saxony-Anhalt, Mecklenburg-Vorpommern and Brandenburg. A stormsurge is expected at the Baltic Coast. Water levels of 1.5m above normal are expected.

==== Storm impacts ====
A wind gust of 99 mph (159 km/h) is recorded at St Mary's Airport, Isles of Scilly, marking a new record for the site. A wind gust of 123 mph (198 km/h) was also reported in Padstow, Cornwall. A stronger gust of 213 km/h (132 mph) occurred at Barfleur, province of Manche, France.

Almost 100 schools in Cornwall have completely closed early on Thursday ahead of the arrival of the storm.

Up to 60,000 properties lost power across the United Kingdom, with over 380,000 reported in France. Storm Goretti has caused widespread destruction and disruption across the UK, the Channel Islands, and France, characterised by a rare combination of record-breaking winds and heavy snowfall. Structural Damage and Dangerous Conditions In the South West and the Channel Islands, extreme winds gusting between 90 mph and 100 mph—and peaking at 132 mph in Northern France—have caused significant structural damage. Reports include roofs being blown off buildings, windows shattered by flying debris, and hundreds of trees uprooted. The storm surge, combined with high tides, led to severe coastal overtopping, with large waves throwing debris onto coastal roads and damaging sea defences. Travel across the UK was brought to a near-standstill. Great Western Railway suspended services throughout Cornwall and parts of Wales, while heavy snow forced the complete closure of major motorways and A-roads, including the A30 and the A628 Woodhead Pass. Aerodromes and airports, including Jersey, Birmingham, and East Midlands, were forced to completely cancel flights or close entirely to clear runways of snow and ice. Numerous motorists were forced to abandon their vehicles overnight as blizzards created impassable drifts.

In France, the rail network faced total gridlock in northern regions. In Paris and the surrounding areas, several Transilien and RER lines (notably the RER D) were completely suspended due to fallen trees on tracks and overhead line damage. Coastal Flooding: High tides combined with a significant storm surge led to major overtopping in coastal towns, with sea defences being breached in several locations along the northern coast.

In Germany, schools were closed on Friday in Lower Saxony, Bremen, Hamburg and parts of Schleswig-Holstein. Bus, rail and ferry services are affected in the North.

Indirectly, an 81-year-old man died in San Sebastián, when wind gusts from Goretti caused him to fall in the Urumea River.

=== Storm Harry ===
Storm Harry
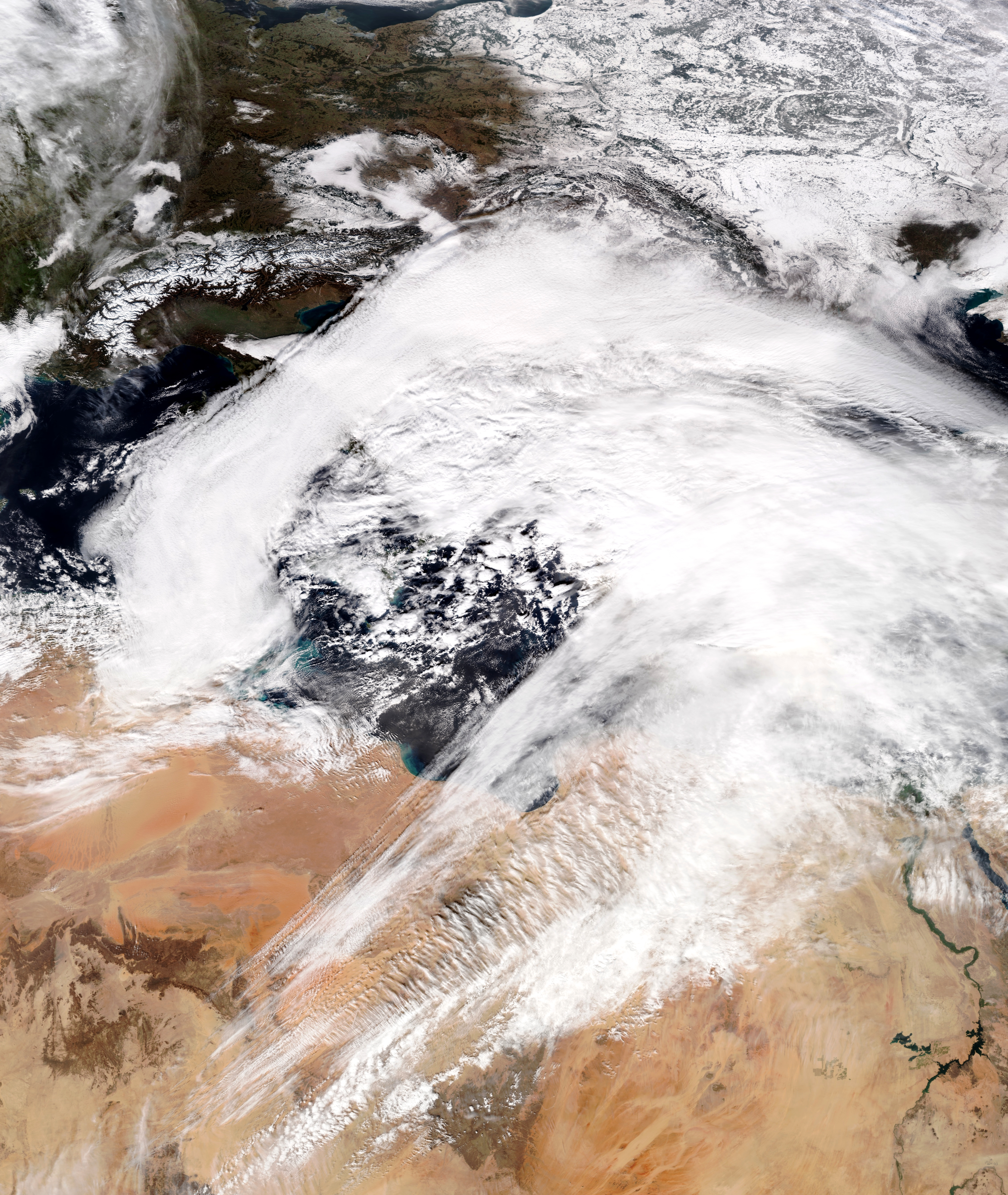

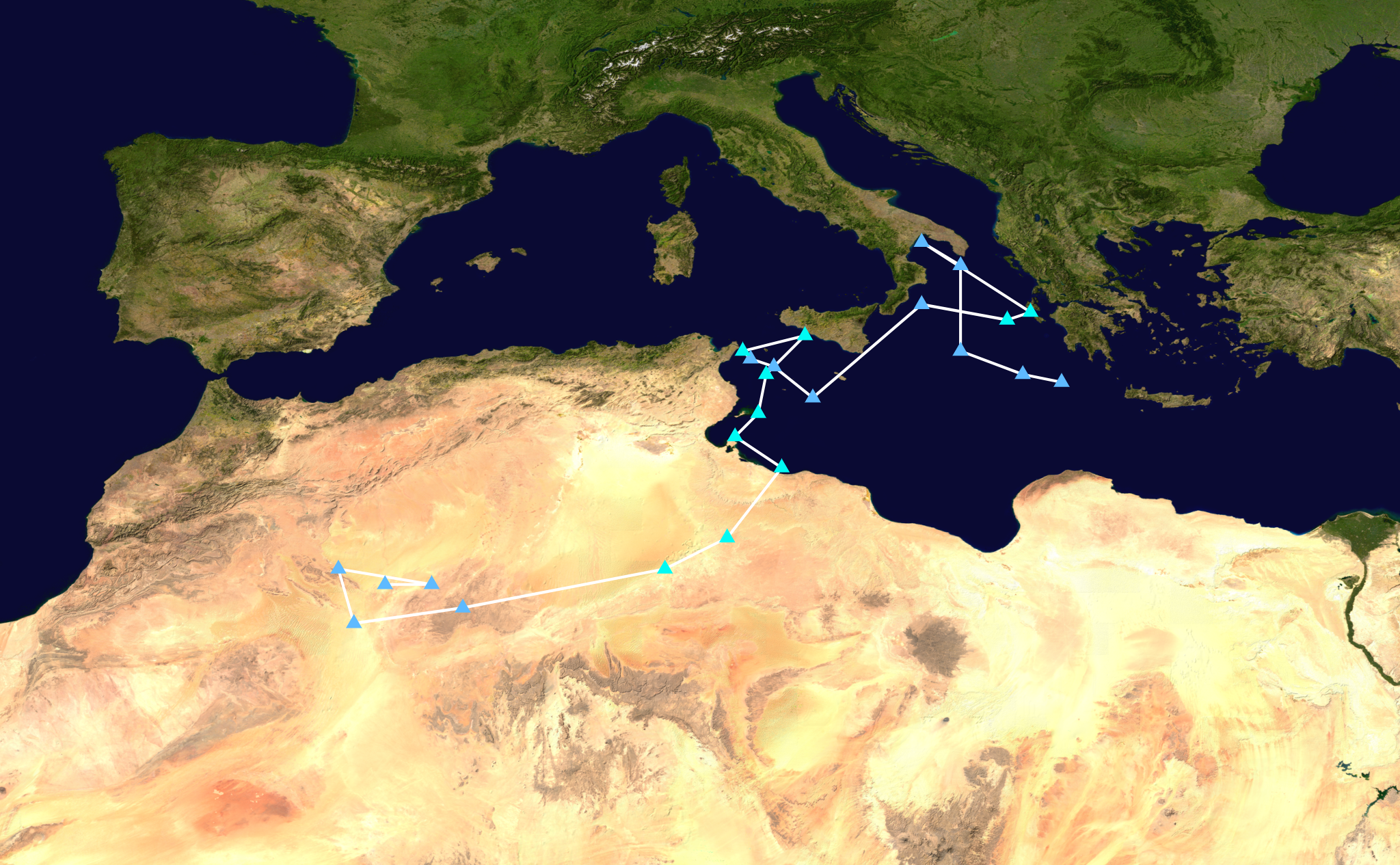
- Area affected: Canary Islands, Spain, Portugal, France, Algeria, Tunisia, Italy, Malta, Greece
- Date of impact: 16–23 January 2026
- Maximum wind gust: 81 mph (36 m/s; 70 kn; 130 km/h) at Mount Teide, Tenerife
- Lowest pressure: 995 hPa (29.38 inHg)
- Fatalities: 390+
- Power outages: Unspecified

==== Date named and background ====
Storm Harry was named by AEMET on 16 January 2026, after the agency spotted a weak area of low pressure meandering over the Iberian Peninsula for a few days, before emerging as a broad area of low pressure over the western Mediterranean.

Travel and infrastructure are facing moderate disruptions, especially in northern regions where a recent cold snap has left mountain passes difficult to navigate. Renfe, the national rail operator, has activated winter protocols in areas like Zaragoza and León to prevent delays caused by ice or debris. In the Canary Islands, the government has moved from a pre-alert to a full Wind Alert for the western islands and Gran Canaria, where gusts are forecast to exceed 70 km/h, potentially affecting local ferry services and high-altitude hiking trails.

==== Weather warnings issued ====
AEMET issued Yellow Warnings for persistent rain and localised thunderstorms in northeastern Spain, particularly across the Barcelona and Girona regions, with some areas expecting up to 20 mm of accumulation in a single hour. Meanwhile, the Canary Islands are under a Coastal Alert as a northwest swell is generating waves of 4 to 5 meters, coinciding with spring tides that increase the risk of coastal flooding.

AEMET issued orange torrential rain warnings as rain was pumped toward Catalonia and Valencia, with expected accumulations over 150 l/m^{2} and severe flooding risks. Maritime conditions are critical, with waves reaching 10 meters along the eastern coast and historic snow depth (up to 90 cm) hitting the Pyrenees. A red warning for rain was issued on 20 January 2026, for Empordà for up to 180 mm in 12 hours.

Italy issued red warnings A high-intensity red alert has been issued for Tuesday, 20 January, as stationary bands of rain are expected to dump over 100mm in 24 hours. This poses a major threat of landslides and flash floods in the steep terrain of Sicily and Calabria, accompanied by 60 mph gale-force winds.

Meteo France also issued, orange warnings for Eastern Corsica as the island is on high alert for intense easterly gales with gusts reaching 100 km/h and heavy localised rainfall. The storm is generating hazardous maritime swells along the coast, particularly disrupting travel and causing significant overtopping in exposed northern and eastern harbors.

Maltese Home Affairs Minister Byron Camilleri and the Maltese Civil Protection Department (CPD) urged residents of Malta to stay indoors and avoid coastal areas due to the severe weather, in addition to various services such as ferry transport and garbage collection being suspended by the government. Schools in Mellieħa, St Paul's Bay and Qawra, as well as MCAST and the University of Malta's Junior College, were temporarily closed as a precautionary measure. The Malta International Airport Met Office issued a red warning for level 9 gale-force winds on 19 January 2026, persisting through the 20th.

==== Storm impacts ====
According to statistics issued by the Times of Malta, the Civil Protection Department of Malta had responded to more than 180 incidents, while the Armed Forces of Malta was called in to help vessels in rough seas by 20 January 2026, mid-afternoon. The Civil Protection Department (CPD) had a busy 30 hours, saying in a social media post that officers had cleared 85 fallen trees, 23 pieces of debris and three billboard "incidents". Marsaxlokk was the most affected as major floods and distracted building were reported.

According to the report, a commuter train derailed in the Vacarisses area, northwest of Barcelona (2026 Gelida train derailment), after a retaining wall collapsed onto the tracks. The train driver was killed, and dozens of passengers were injured (reports indicate between 15 and 37 people were treated). Authorities believe the wall was destabilised by the torrential rainfall associated with Storm Harry, which has been battering the region for several days.

In Tunisia, at least five people were killed as Storm Harry brought record-breaking rainfall and flooding across the coastal regions. Meteorological officials said rainfall levels in some regions were the highest recorded since 1950, reaching 206 millimetres (8.1 in) in Sidi Bou Said. The heavy rains flooded streets, submerged vehicles, and disrupted daily life, leading authorities to close schools and suspend transport and court sessions in several governorates.

Several days after the storm, Sicily experienced a major landslide in the town of Niscemi, caused by the long period of heavy rains and geology of the ground on which the town was built.

Italy's coastguard estimates that 380 others who set sail from Tunisia during the cyclone, which generated huge waves in the Mediterranean, might also have drowned. The coastguard has been searching for eight vessels that had been launched by people smugglers from the Tunisian port city of Sfax during the past 10 days despite the treacherous conditions.

Two fatalities were reported in Greece as Storm Harry moved through the region, including a 56-year-old woman struck by a vehicle in floodwaters in Athens and a 53-year-old Coast Guard officer swept away while securing a vessel at the port of Astros. Greece's national meteorological service (HNMS) reported that heavy rainfall and thunderstorms began early Wednesday in the western parts of the country, as well as in central mainland areas and the Peloponnese. As the day progressed, the severe weather moved eastward, reaching the Aegean and eastern mainland regions. Snow was recorded in all mountainous regions, with particularly heavy snowfall even at lower altitudes in parts of Thessaly and Macedonia.

=== Storm Ingrid (Leonie) ===
Storm Ingrid
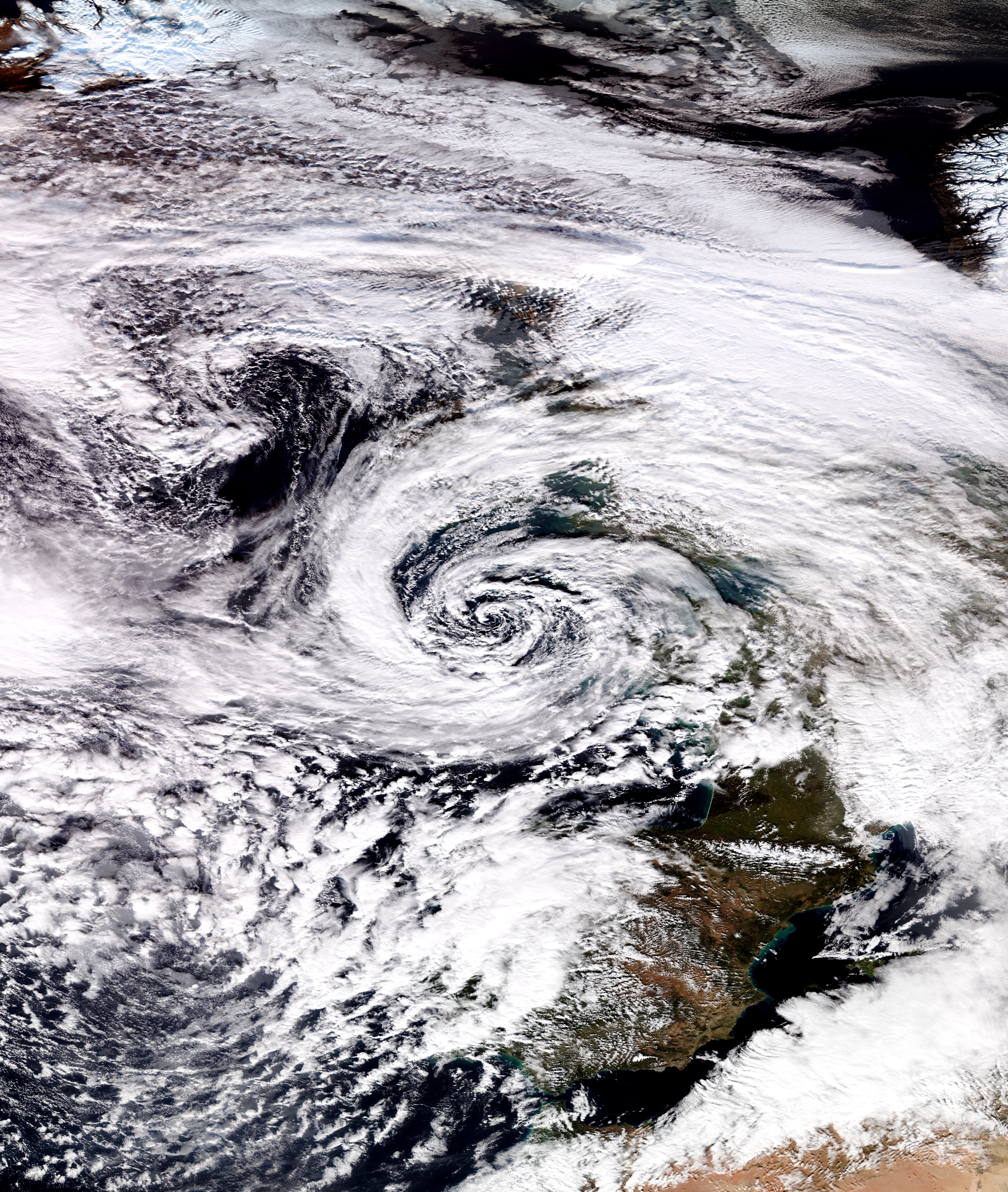

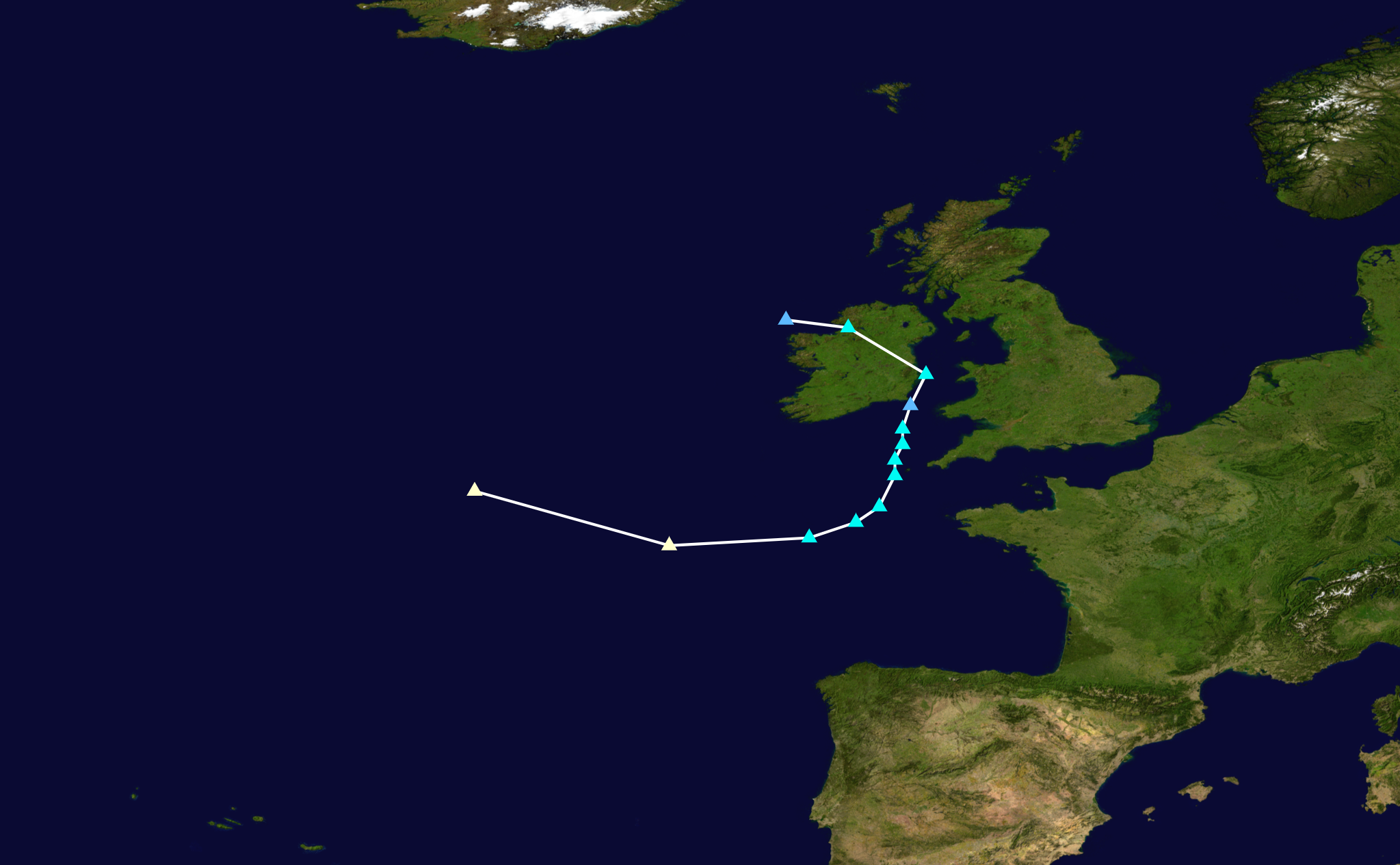
- Area affected: United Kingdom, Spain, Portugal, France, Ireland
- Date of impact: 20–25 January 2026
- Maximum wind gust: Unspecified
- Lowest pressure: 954 hPa (28.17 inHg)
- Fatalities: Unspecified
- Power outages: Unspecified

==== Date named and background ====
Storm Ingrid was named by IPMA on 20 January 2026 and Leonie by the Free University of Berlin the next morning.

==== Weather warnings issued ====
In Spain and Portugal, red alerts are active in Galicia, Spain, for extraordinary danger from 9-metre waves. In Portugal, orange alerts cover most coastal districts due to predicted 15-metre wave sets and gusts of 100 km/h. Significant snowfall of up to 25 cm is expected in northern mountains, with snow potentially reaching southern regions.

In the United Kingdom, an amber risk to life warning is in effect for eastern Scotland, where rainfall exceeding 100 mm may cause dangerous flooding and isolate communities. Yellow warnings cover wider areas for rain and wind, with the storm expected to bring gales and hill snow to Wales and southwest England on Friday. The Met Office also issued a yellow wind and rain warning for South Wales, and South-west England, including Cornwall and the Scilly Isles, where heavy rain will bring up to 40 mm to saturated ground through Friday night, likely causing flooding across the region. These downpours will be accompanied by 60 mph coastal gales and large waves before conditions ease on Saturday morning.

Met Éireann has issued yellow coastal small craft warnings for Gale Force 8 warnings for the Irish Sea (Strangford Lough to Roches Point). Meteo France issued orange rain warnings for the north-west of the country as well as a wide yellow wind warning.

Authorities warn of widespread travel chaos, power outages, and flooding. No fatalities have been confirmed for this specific system yet, but emergency services have advised against all non-essential travel in high-risk areas.

==== Storm impacts ====
A partial collapse of the 157-year-old Teignmouth Grand Pier in Devon, which saw a large section washed away by powerful waves. Nearby in Dawlish, the sea wall crumbled, leaving tonnes of debris on the rail lines. Coastal towns reported smashed benches, destroyed flower beds, and "unusually high" swells that battered seafront infrastructure.

The storm caused travel disruption across the South West and Wales. All rail services between Exeter St Davids and Newton Abbot were suspended due to the sea wall breach at Dawlish, while ferry sailings between Fishguard and Rosslare were cancelled. In Wales, the Cleddau Bridge was closed to high-sided vehicles, and in Scotland, multiple roads including the A94 were shut due to rising floodwaters.

Dozens of flood warnings were issued as rivers like the River Teign and River Axe threatened to burst their banks. Emergency services were active in Scotland, where firefighters rescued three people from stranded vehicles in Aberdeenshire. Environmental concerns also rose in Pembrokeshire, where storm overflows led to untreated sewage discharges at several popular beaches.

In Portugal and Spain, the storm triggered "extreme" red alerts. Portugal's western coastline faced waves up to 15 metres high, leading to the closure of schools and roads in Porto and Viana do Castelo. In Spain, a "polar air mass" followed the rain, causing temperatures to plummet and snow to fall at altitudes as low as 300 metres in northern regions.

=== Storm Joseph (Marilu) ===
Storm Joseph
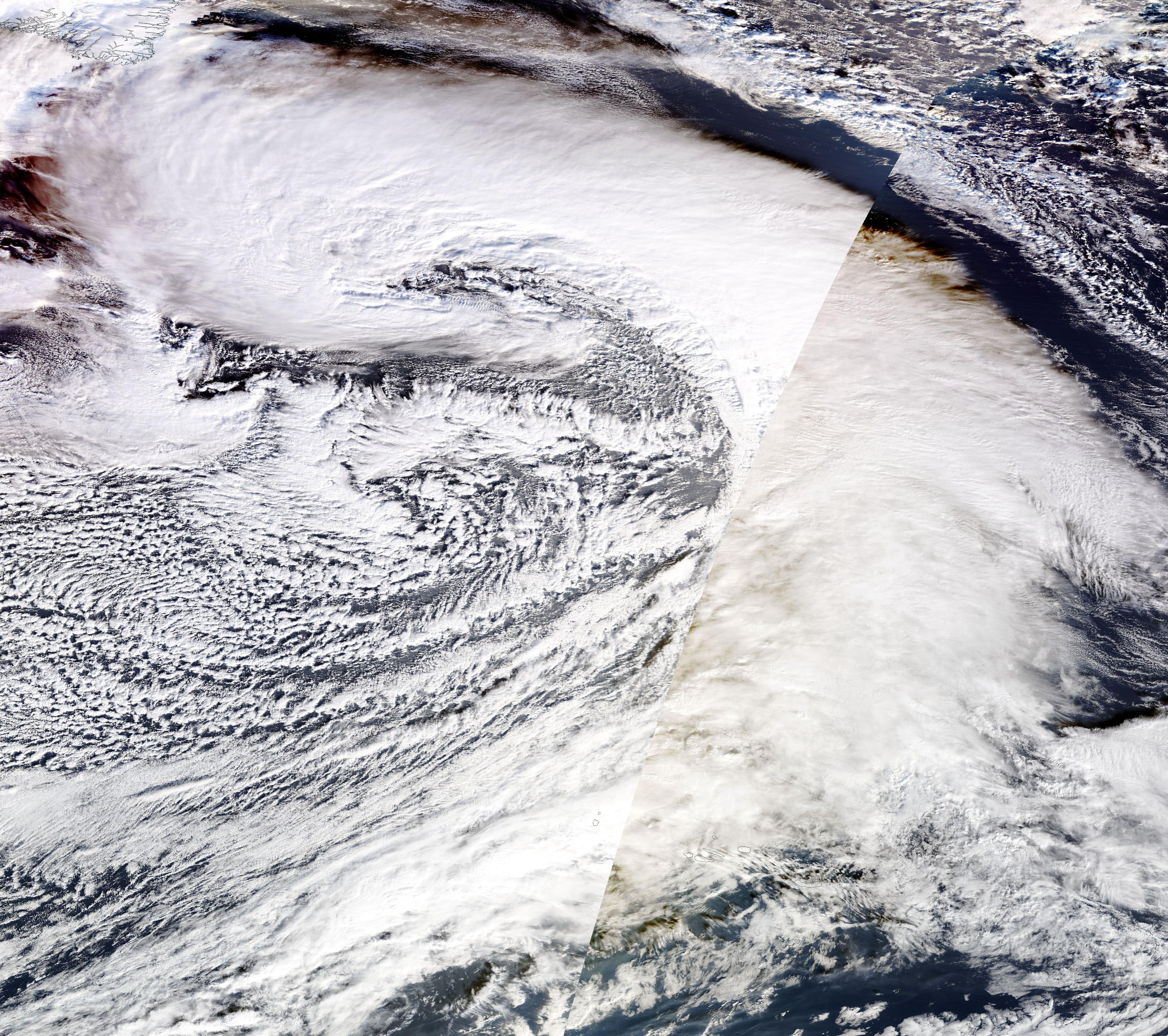

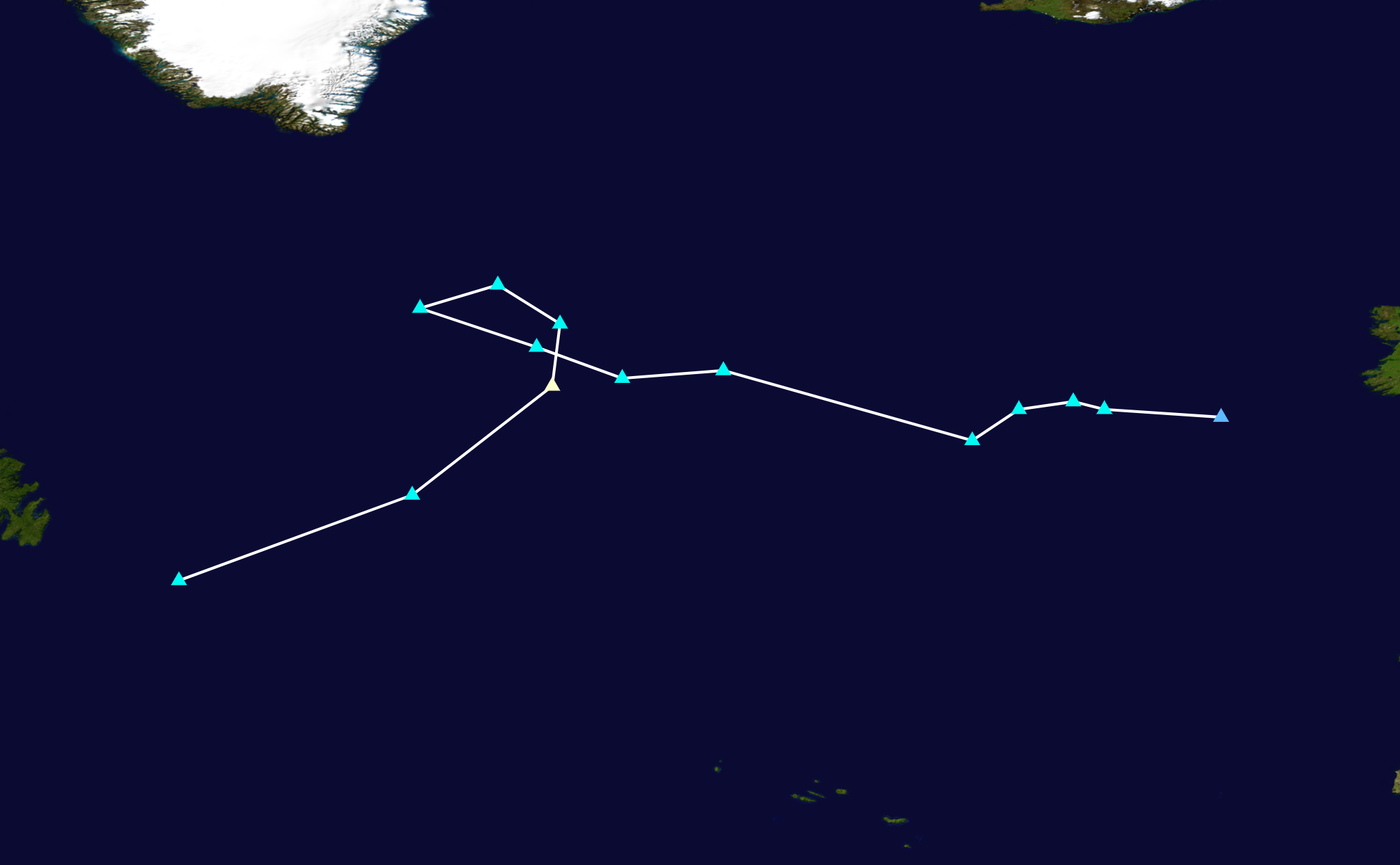
- Area affected: Azores, Portugal
- Date of impact: 25–28 January 2026
- Maximum wind gust: Unspecified
- Lowest pressure: 939 hPa (27.73 inHg)
- Fatalities: 1
- Power outages: Unspecified

==== Date named and background ====
Storm Joseph was named by IPMA on 25 January, and Marilu by FUB on the same day.

==== Weather warnings issued ====
Spain's weather agency, AEMET, issued its highest level of alert, a Red Warning, for the Pontevedra area in Galicia on 26 January 2026. This "extreme danger" warning followed forecasts of torrential rain exceeding 120mm within 12 hours, creating a high risk of flash flooding. Much of the rest of mainland Spain, including Madrid, was placed under yellow and orange alerts for heavy rain, while mountainous regions braced for significant snowfall as temperatures were set to plummet.

In Portugal, the national weather service IPMA placed several districts, including Porto, Lisbon, and Braga, under Orange Alerts for persistent, heavy rainfall and high winds. The arrival of Storm Joseph—named by Portuguese meteorologists—brought the risk of river flooding, particularly in the north, and dangerous coastal conditions with waves predicted to peak at a massive 12 metres. Additionally, wind gusts of up to 100 km/h were forecast for highland areas, alongside warnings for snowfall in the Serra da Estrela mountains.

==== Storm impacts ====
Large waves caused some impacts. However, most impacts came from Storm Kristin, which developed off Joseph and devastated parts of Portugal and caused a humanitarian crisis there, alongside with causing a significant impact in Spain.

This is one of those scenarios where a windstorm was named because of the risk of impacts, but those impacts for this particular storm diminished as things evolved.

=== Storm Chandra (Norma) ===
Storm Chandra
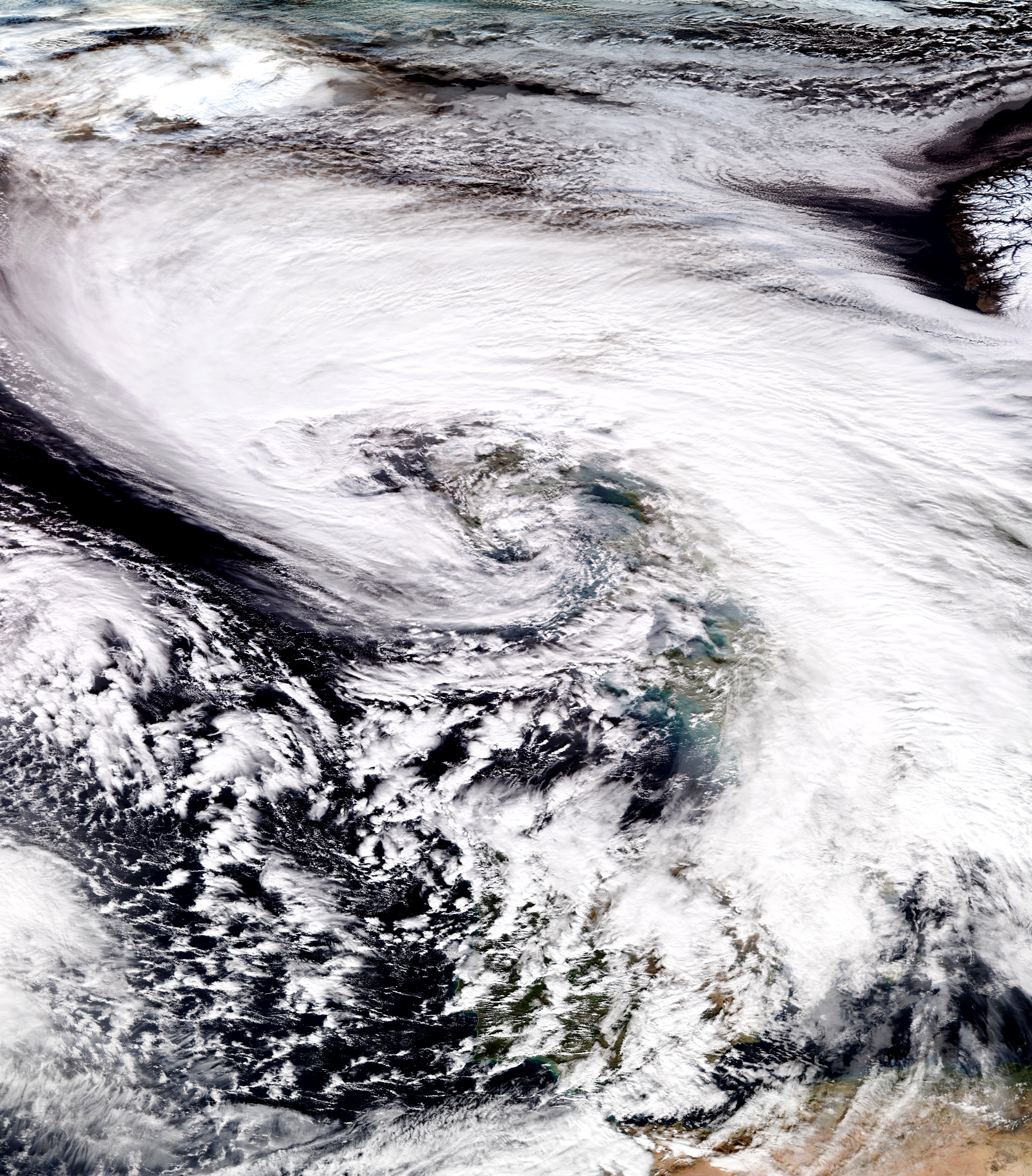

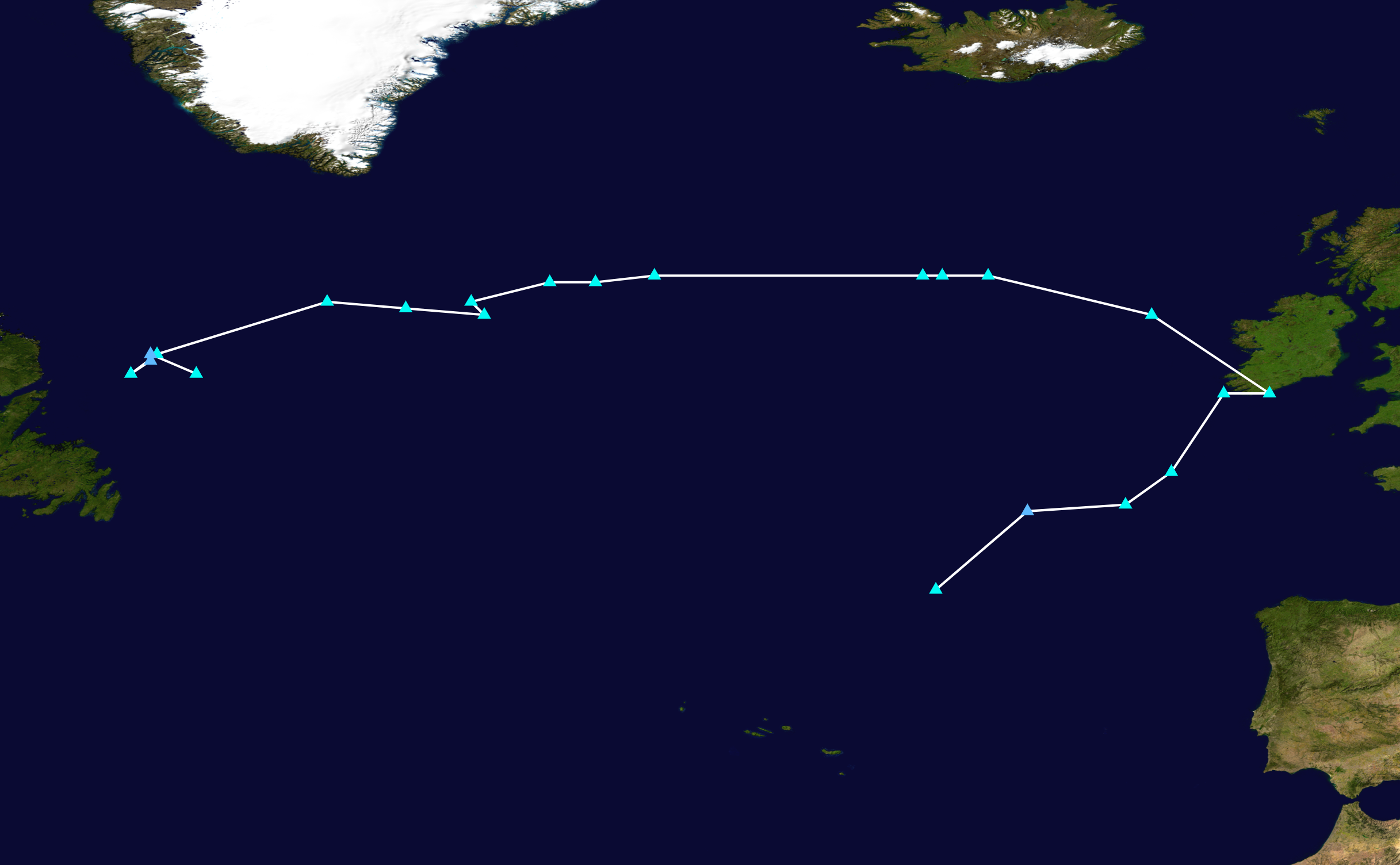
- Area affected: United Kingdom, Ireland
- Date of impact: 26–28 January 2026
- Maximum wind gust: 73 mph (33 m/s; 63 kn; 117 km/h) at Morfa Nefyn, Wales
- Lowest pressure: 958 hPa (28.29 inHg)
- Fatalities: 1
- Power outages: 30,000+

==== Date named and background ====
Storm Chandra was named by the Met Office on 26 January 2026. It was also named Norma by FUB the same day.

An area of low pressure, which developed quickly in the Atlantic, which impacted western Europe bringing severe flooding and wind to Northern Ireland, South West England and South Wales.

==== Weather warnings issued ====
An Amber Rain Warning was put in place for South Devon, Dorset, and Southeast Cornwall, where heavy rainfall was expected to reach up to 80mm on already saturated ground. Simultaneously, an Amber Wind Warning was issued for eastern Northern Ireland, with forecasts predicting dangerous gusts of up to 75 mph. Yellow warnings for snow were also established for parts of Scotland and Northern England, as significant accumulations were anticipated on higher ground.

In Ireland, Met Éireann released a Status Yellow Rain Warning for Waterford, Wexford, and Wicklow, citing risks of localised flooding and hazardous travel conditions. Marine warnings were also active for all Irish coasts as winds were projected to reach Gale Force 8.

==== Storm impacts ====
Storm Chandra caused widespread disruption across the UK and Ireland on 27 January 2026, leading to the closure of nearly 250 schools in Northern Ireland and the transition of major universities to online learning. The storm's arrival triggered "danger to life" amber warnings as wind gusts reached 75 mph and heavy rainfall fell on ground already saturated by previous storms. In coastal areas of Devon and Cornwall, significant damage was reported to roads and beachfront structures, while over 130 flood warnings were activated across England. Transport networks faced severe interference, with the M48 Severn Bridge and the Humber Bridge both closing or restricting access due to high winds. Rail services, particularly Great Western Railway, were forced to shut down several lines in the South West as flooding submerged tracks and debris blocked routes. Meanwhile, in Scotland and Northern England, the storm brought heavy snowfall of up to 20 cm on higher ground, creating hazardous driving conditions and leaving some upland communities isolated.

The Environment Agency escalated its response by issuing a rare Severe Flood Warning (the highest level) for the River Otter at Ottery St Mary. This "danger to life" alert was triggered when river levels were forecast to surpass their highest ever recorded levels at the Fenny Bridges gauge. Emergency services focused on evacuations at the Finnimore Industrial Estate and Thorne Farm Way, where deep, fast-flowing water inundated properties from the early hours of Tuesday morning. Another severe flood warning was issued from the Environment Agency for Upper Frome in Dorchester.

The road network in South West England was significantly severed as arterial routes became impassable. National Highways confirmed the A30 was closed in both directions between Ottery St Mary and Exeter Airport, with the A303 also shut between Ilminster and Upottery. In addition to the major bridges, the A377 at Newton St Cyres and the A35 at Stinsford were blocked, leaving many commuters in Devon and Dorset stranded as fire crews worked to rescue motorists from submerged vehicles.

In Northern Ireland, the scale of disruption was immense, with the number of confirmed school closures rising to over 300 institutions. Major academic bodies, including Queen’s University Belfast and multiple Ulster University campuses, completely suspended physical operations. Beyond education, the storm caused significant power outages, with Northern Ireland Electricity (NIE) reporting that 10,000 properties lost power, while an additional 20,000 homes and businesses faced blackouts across the Republic of Ireland.

The storm effectively halted travel across the Irish Sea and Scottish coastlines. Caledonian MacBrayne (CalMac) was forced to cancel almost all its ferry sailings, including those to Mull, Iona, and Barra, while Stena Line suspended all morning crossings between Belfast and Liverpool. Aviation also took a hit, with Belfast City Airport cancelling at least 30 flights and regional carrier Loganair grounding 20 services across its network due to the extreme wind gusts.

There was one fatality as a result of the storm after a lorry crashed into a river in the New Forest, killing the driver.

=== Storm Kristin ===
Storm Kristin
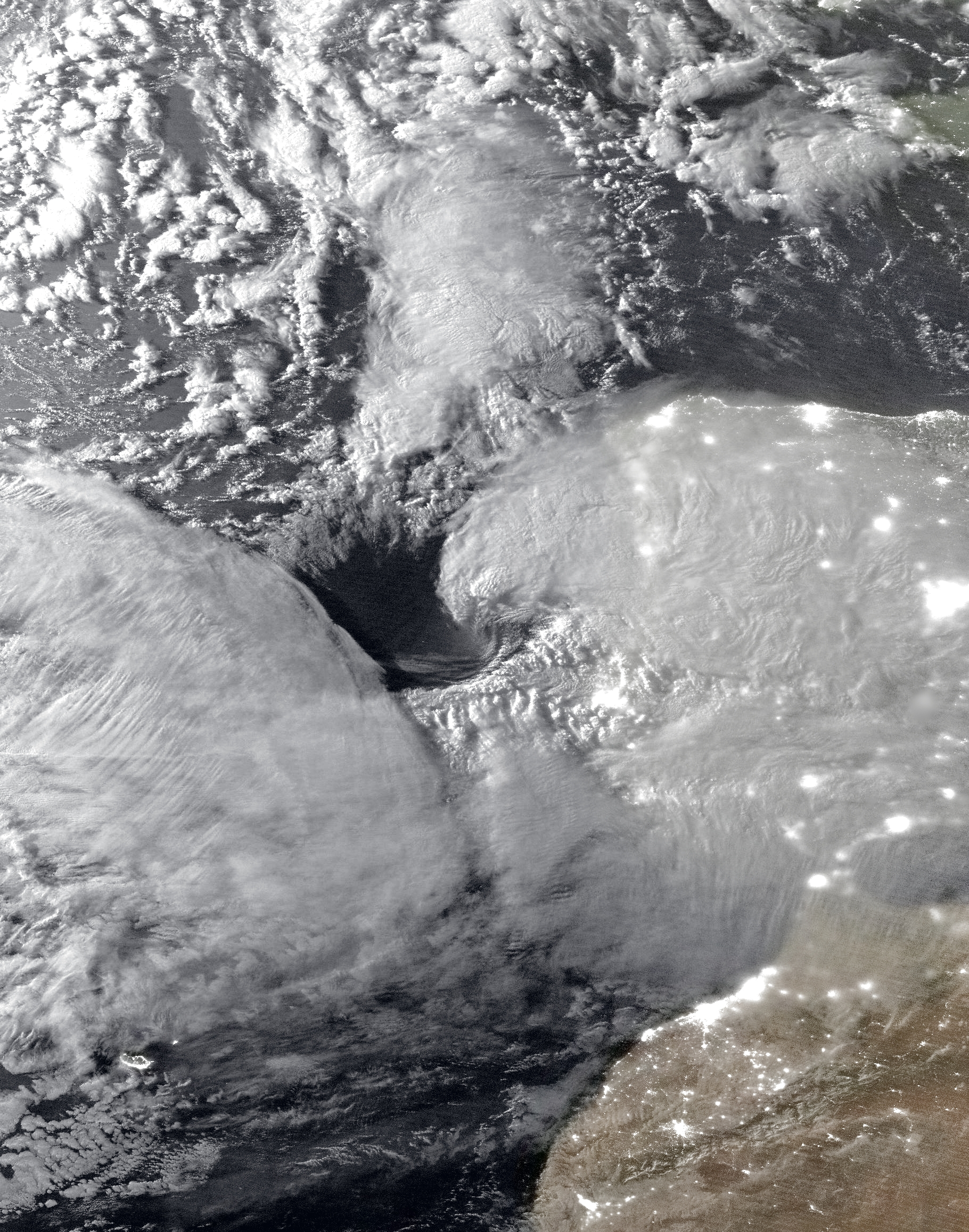

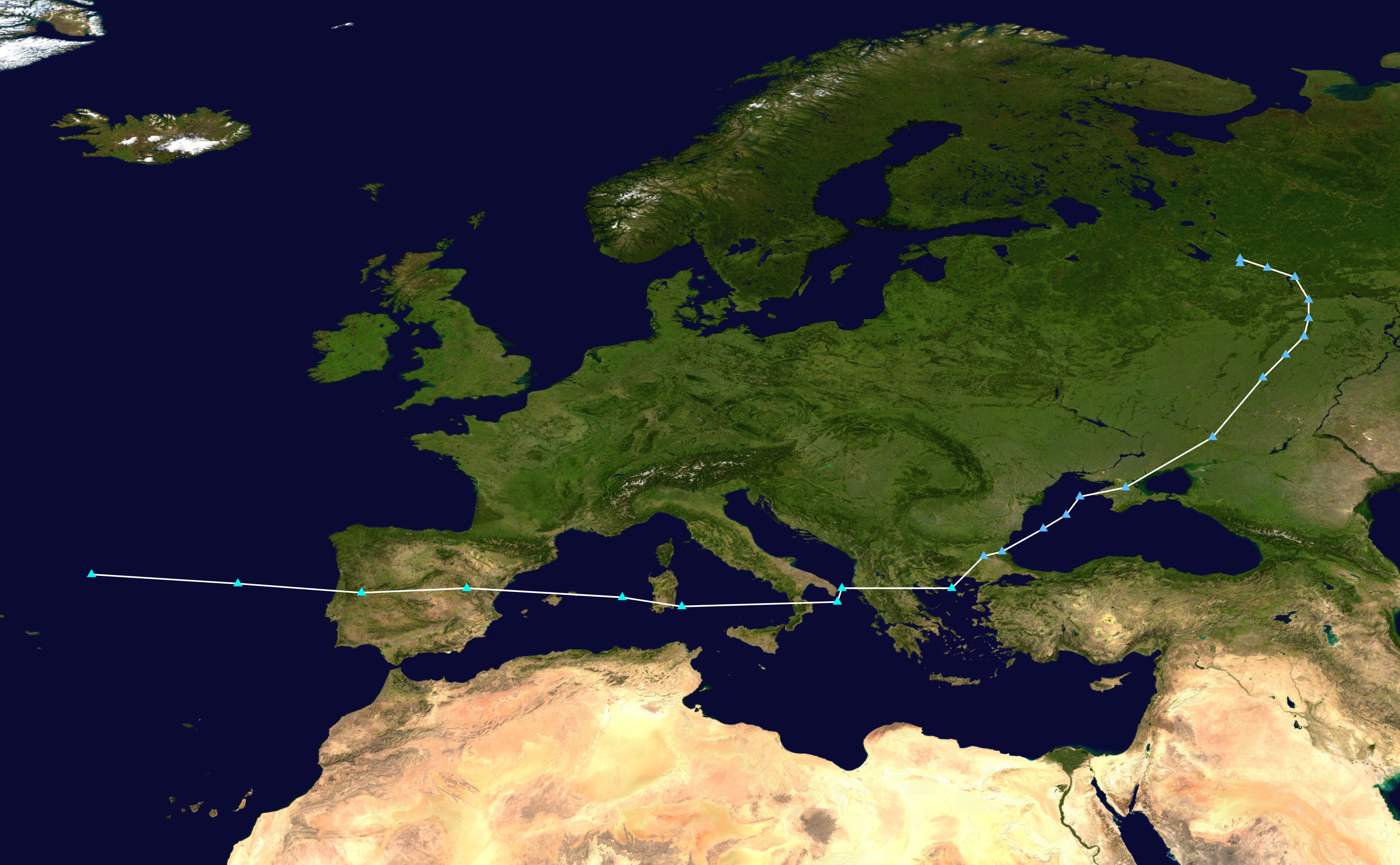
- Area affected: Portugal, Spain, Gibraltar, Morocco, Italy, Greece, the Balkans, Ukraine
- Date of impact: 27–31 January 2026
- Maximum wind gust: 129.74 mph (58.00 m/s; 112.74 kn; 208.80 km/h) by at Soure, Portugal; 148 mph (66 m/s; 129 kn; 238 km/h) at an amateur station in Lavos, Portugal
- Lowest pressure: 975 hPa (28.79 inHg)
- Fatalities: 9 (6 direct, 3 indirect)
- Injuries: 545+ (indirect)
- Power outages: 1,000,000+

==== Date named and background ====
Storm Kristin was named by the IPMA on 27 January 2026, as a significant impact was forecasted.

Kristin developed from a baroclinic disturbance generated by Storm Joseph, which subsequently developed into a compact but extremely powerful storm. Under influence of a trough in the jet stream, Kristin underwent a process of explosive cyclogenesis. In the hours before landfall, Kristin developed a sting jet, as Kristin was a warm seclusion cyclone. Instead of weakening, like numerical weather predictions models suggested beforehand, Kristin made landfall in the Leiria district at peak intensity.

==== Weather warnings issued ====
Red warnings for wind were issued for northern parts of Portugal with 140 km/h winds forecasted. AEMET, The State Meteorological Agency for Spain has issued a red alert for the interior of Pontevedra due to forecasts of torrential rain exceeding 120mm. Strong winds are a major concern across the country with hurricane-force gusts expected to impact the far southeast and various interior regions. Much of the Spanish interior remains under orange or yellow alerts for gusts that could reach 100 km/h and cause structural damage. Significant snowfall is predicted for the northern plateau at altitudes as low as 600 meters which may disrupt major motorways such as the A-1 and A-6. Coastal areas will also experience extremely rough seas with waves up to 8 meters battering the Atlantic coast and severe conditions spreading into the Mediterranean tomorrow.

On 28 January 2026, Italian Civil Protection Department had issued Orange Alerts for Lazio, Sardinia, and Molise due to the arrival of Storm Kristin. These regions face high-speed winds and significant hydrogeological risks, while a Yellow Alert covered much of the rest of the peninsula for rain, wind, and thunderstorms. In the north, Red Alerts for Avalanches (Level 4/5) were in effect for the Western Alps, while the south remained in a State of Emergency following last week's Storm Harry, which triggered the massive 4 km-long landslide currently threatening the town of Niscemi, Sicily.

The National Emergency and Civil Protection Authority (ANEPC) elevated the state of special readiness to level 4 (the maximum) in the day before storm Kristin made landfall.

==== Storm impacts ====
Wind gusts reached 208.8 km/h (129.7 mph) at Soure, making Kristin the most powerful storm to have ever affected Portugal. An amateur station measured a wind gust of 238 km/h (148 mph) at Lavos, which is located in the Coimbra district, which would possibly make Kristin one of the most intense storms in terms of wind speed to have ever affected Europe.

Six people are now reported to have died as Storm Kristin brought driving rain accompanied by high winds to Portugal overnight. With 1 fatality in Spain, a woman who was hit by a falling palm tree. The various deaths have not all been fully explained. One man died as a tree fell on top of the car he was driving in Vila Franca de Xira. Another person died as a result of a falling metallic structure in Leiria – and since then three other fatalities have been confirmed by authorities.

Furthermore, at least 485 people got indirectly injured as a result of cleaning and reconstruction accidents.

Power outages were reported in Guarda, Coimbra, Castelo Branco, Portalegre, Leiria, Santarém, Abrantes, Peniche and Setúbal where as many as 855,000 homes are said to be without electricity. During its peak, around one million homes experienced power outages. Rail services are already interrupted along many lines throughout the country.

In Extremadura, the storm caused widespread wind- and rain-related incidents, prompting emergency coordination by the regional 112 Extremadura service. Between midnight and 18:00 on 28 January 112 handled 2,500 calls and 455 incidents directly linked to the storm; from 26 January (15:00) to 28 January (18:00), it managed 5,260 calls and 1,462 incidents, including 535 related to the weather alert. Telecommunications were affected, with reported line outages in several areas—especially the north of the province of Cáceres—as strong gusts damaged infrastructure.

In the city of Cáceres, municipal incidents included falling trees and branches, as well as detached roof elements and masonry; no injuries were reported locally. A large fallen tree damaged part of a perimeter wall at an educational site, alongside additional tree falls at multiple locations across the city. A wind gust of 108 km/h was reported in Cáceres during the event. Road transport was also disrupted across the region. In the province of Cáceres, seven roads and three rural tracks were reported with circulation problems (snow, river overflows, or waterlogged carriageways), and two trucks overturned on the A-66 due to strong winds. As a precaution, the regional government suspended morning classes across Extremadura on 28 January, citing forecasts of heavy rain, snow and strong gusts; snow warnings specifically covered northern areas of the province of Cáceres. Regional emergency and forest-fire crews (Infoex) were deployed to address material damage, including removal of loose roof tiles and clearing wind-blown objects, in multiple localities—several of them in the province of Cáceres—such as Grimaldo, Casares de Hurdes, Hinojal, Brozas, Valdesalor, Garciaz, Membrío, Bohonal de Ibor, and Garrovillas de Alconétar.

=== Storm Patricia ===
Storm Patricia
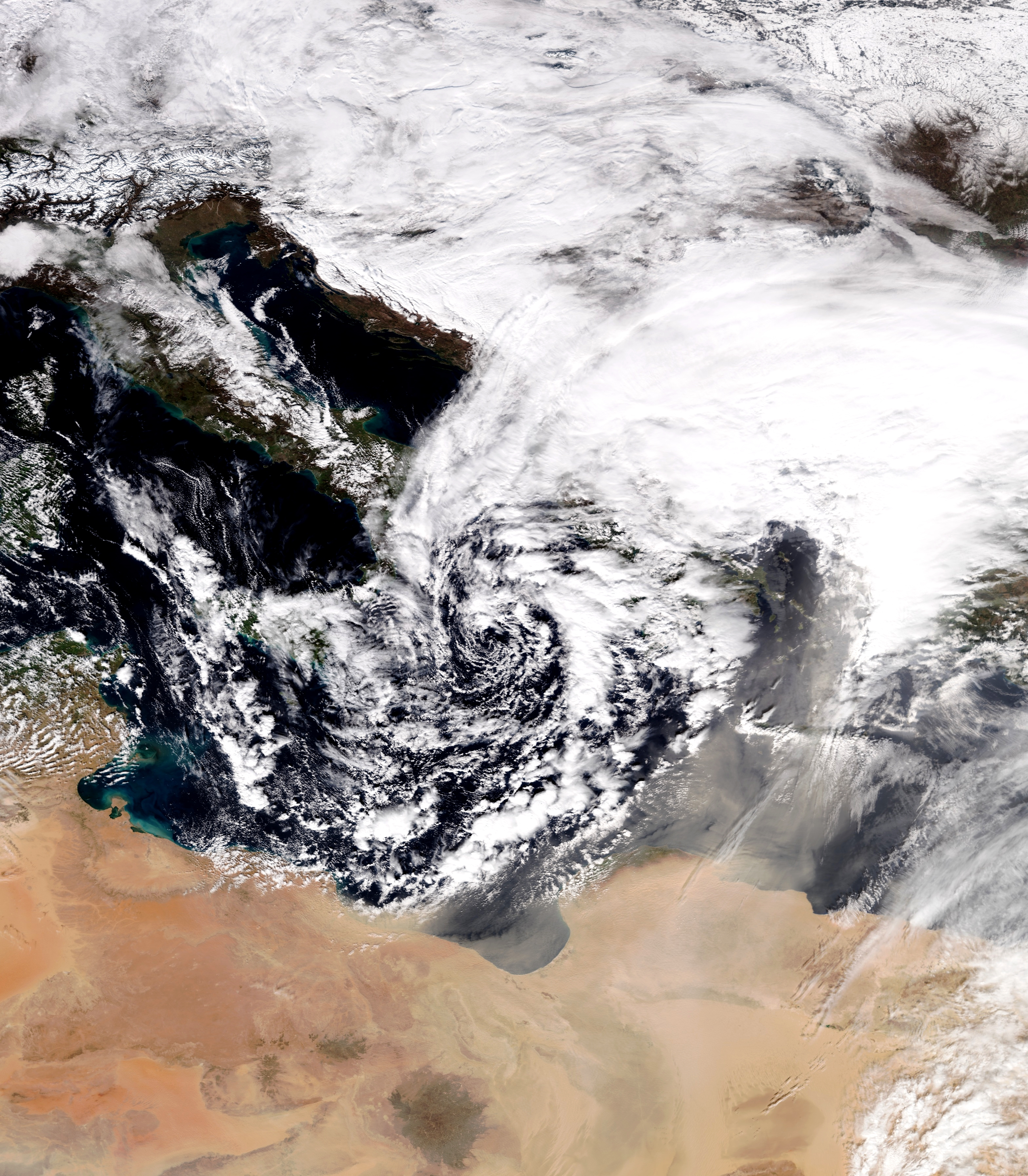

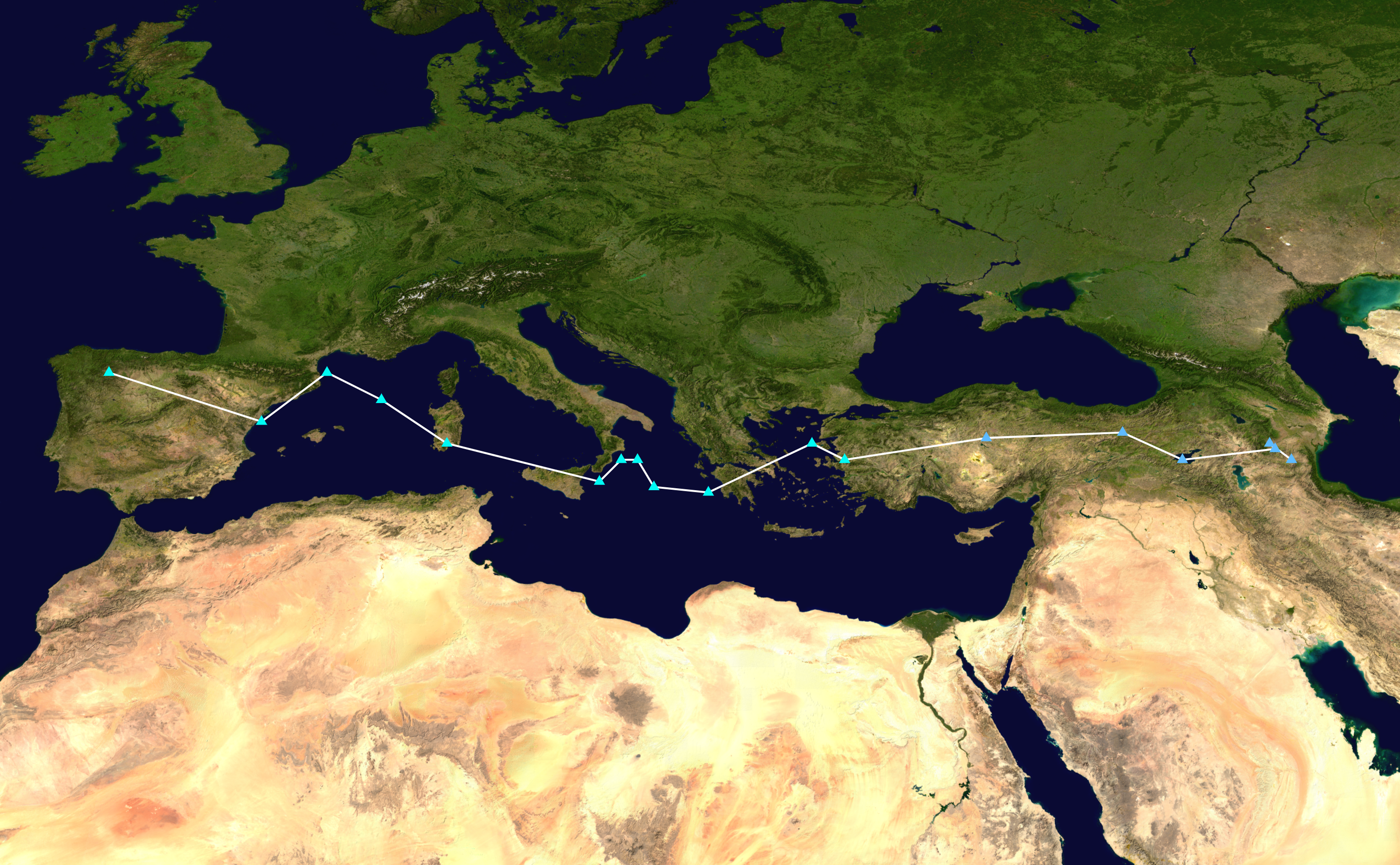
- Area affected: Italy, Croatia, Greece, Bulgaria, Romania, the Balkans
- Date of impact: 30 January–3 February 2026
- Maximum wind gust: Unspecified
- Lowest pressure: 992 hPa (29.29 inHg)
- Fatalities: Unspecified
- Power outages: Unspecified

==== Date named and background ====
Storm Patricia was named on 30 January 2026 by the Free University of Berlin.

The system impacted Italy, Croatia, and the wider Balkan Peninsula. Emerging from a secondary low-pressure area following the passage of Storm Kristin.

==== Weather warnings issued ====
In Bulgaria, The National Institute of Meteorology and Hydrology (NIMH) has issued a Code Orange warning for 24 out of 28 districts, forecasting significant snowfall of up to 20 cm and severe blizzards with visibility-reducing snow drifts. In Romania, The National Meteorological Administration (ANM) has issued a severe weather advisory for a sharp cold snap, with temperatures expected to plunge to -15 °C in mountain depressions and widespread frost across the country.

National meteorological services issued severe alerts for the arrival of the storm on 1 February 2026. The Croatian Meteorological and Hydrological Service (DHMZ) issued red wind warnings for the Velebit Channel and the Kvarner region, where hurricane-force Bora winds were forecast to exceed 150 km/h. In Italy, the Protezione Civile issued orange and red warnings for torrential rain and flash flooding across Sicily and Calabria. Additionally, yellow marine warnings were maintained for the Ionian Sea as the system moved toward the Greek FIR.

==== Storm impacts ====
The storm was responsible for significant structural damage and travel chaos across the region. In Croatia, extreme Bora winds forced the closure of the A1 motorway and the Krk Bridge, while maritime transport was suspended due to gusts of 155 km/h. In Greece, torrential rain led to flooding in Agiokampos and the Peloponnese, where roads were submerged by rising waters. In southern Italy, the system exacerbated existing damage from earlier cyclones, contributing to land subsidence and evacuations in Niscemi, while all ferry connections to the Aeolian Islands were suspended due to sea conditions.

=== Storm Leonardo (Stephie) ===
Storm Leonardo
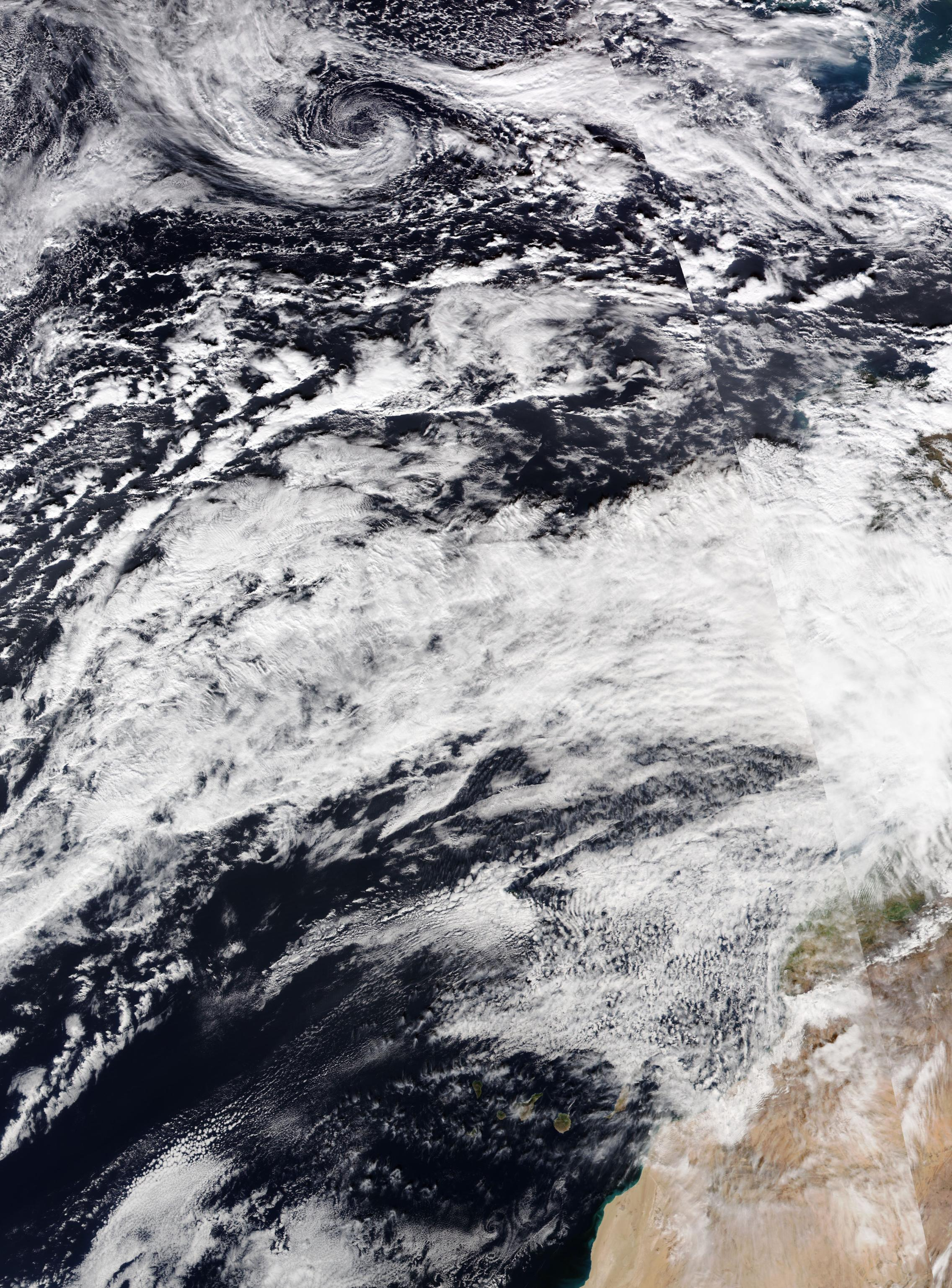

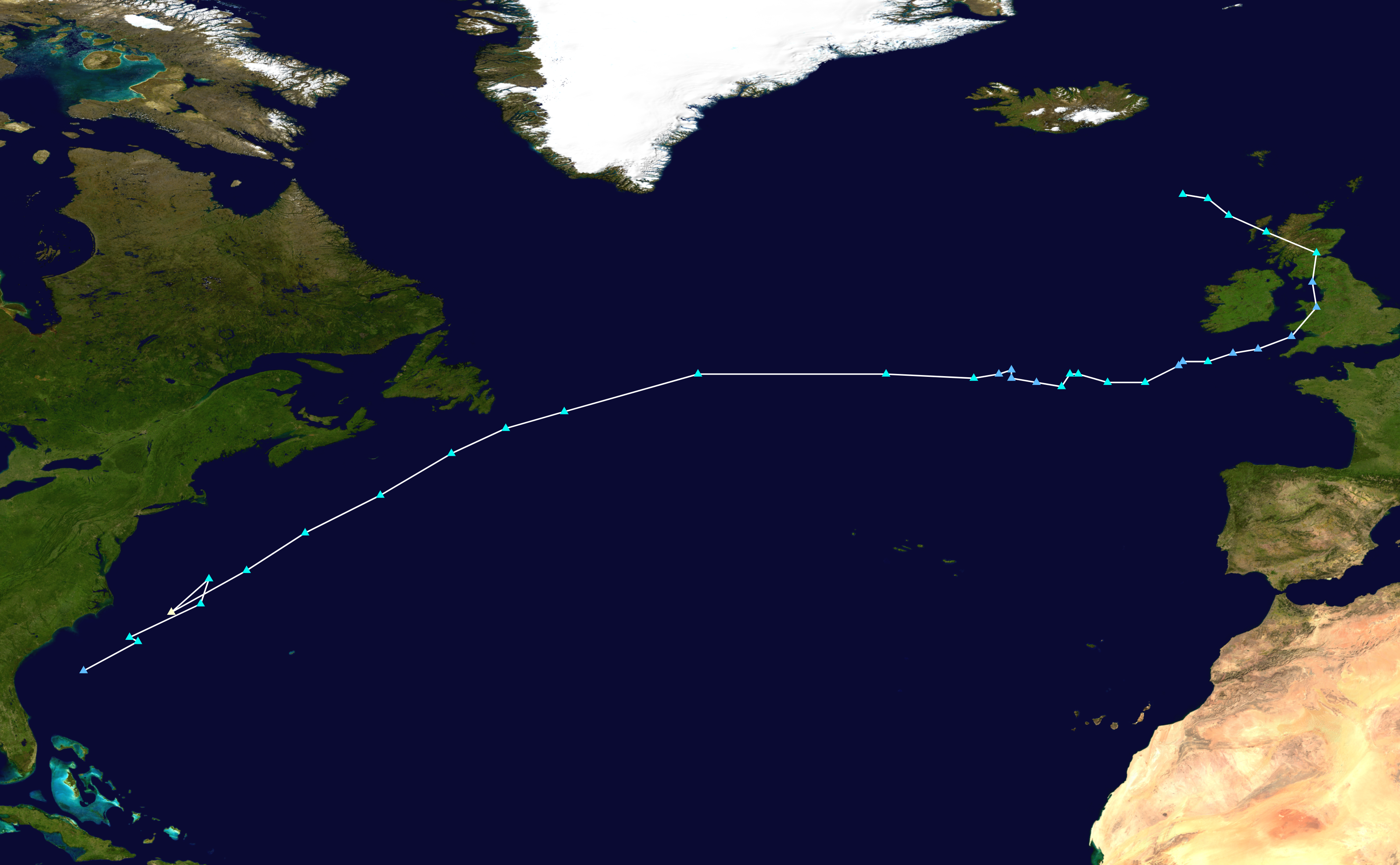
- Area affected: Spain, Azores, Portugal, Morocco, United Kingdom
- Date of impact: 2–7 February
- Maximum wind gust: Unspecified
- Lowest pressure: 964 hPa (28.47 inHg)
- Fatalities: 2
- Power outages: Unspecified

==== Date named and background ====
Storm Leonardo was named on 2 February 2026 by IPMA. It was named Stephie by FUB a few days later on 5 February.

Unlike the preceding Storm Kristin, Leonardo was not as severe or impactful for a sting jet event, for it was associated with an atmospheric river.

==== Weather warnings issued ====
In Portugal, the IPMA issued amber alerts for 10 coastal districts due to "rough seas", with waves expected to reach between 5–6 m (16–20 ft) and peaks of up to 11 m (36 ft) Heavy rain fell on already saturated ground, leading to a high risk of flooding along the Douro, Tagus, and Mondego rivers. Yellow alerts for snow were also issued for the northern highlands, where accumulations could exceed 10 cm (3.9 in) above 1,000 m (3,300 ft).

Portugal is facing a "multi-hazard" event with the Azores (Western Group) under a Red Alert for massive waves topping 10 m (33 ft). On the mainland, the entire western coast is under an Orange Alert for waves up to 14 meters and wind gusts reaching 95 km/h in the highlands. The situation is particularly dire in the Leiria region, where 134,000 households are still without power from last week. Engineers are monitoring the Guadalquivir and Guadalhorce river basins minute-by-minute, as reservoirs are nearing capacity and the risk of overflowing is considered "very high."

In Spain, AEMET activated widespread yellow alerts for intense rainfall in Galicia, Andalusia, and Extremadura, with some areas expecting up to 90 litres per square metre above seasonal norms. Coastal Galicia remains under an amber alert for waves reaching 6 metres. Additionally, alerts for thaw (snowmelt) are active in Castilla y León, as rising temperatures and heavy rain threaten to cause rapid runoff and river overflows in areas recently covered by snow. In response to the Red Alerts, regional leader Juanma Moreno has ordered the suspension of all in-person classes across the provinces of Málaga, Cádiz, Seville, Huelva, Córdoba, and Jaén for Wednesday.

The next day, The Spanish State Meteorological Agency has activated its highest warning level (red) for Wednesday, 4 February, in the Serranía de Ronda (Málaga) and Grazalema (Cádiz). Forecasters warn of "extraordinary danger" with rainfall totals potentially exceeding 250mm (nearly 10 inches) in just 24 hours. Because the ground is fully saturated after Storm Kristin, authorities warn that dry riverbeds could become "raging torrents" in minutes. Orange warnings for rain, were also issued for southern areas of Spain.

The Met Office issued a yellow rain warning for south-west England where accumulations of 10–20 mm are possible fairly widely, with perhaps as much as 40–60 mm over Dartmoor. Given saturated ground following recent rain, there is a chance this may leading to some flooding and disruption in places.

==== Storm impacts ====
More than 3,000 residents were evacuated from flood-prone areas as a precautionary measure starting Tuesday. All schools across Andalusia were closed, with the sole exception of the easternmost province of Almería. Hundreds of soldiers were deployed to the region to assist local rescue and emergency services.

The human cost of Leonardo stands at 1 certain, and another expected. In Portugal, a 70-year-old man lost his life in the southern Alentejo region after his vehicle was swept off a flooded road near a dam on Wednesday night. Meanwhile, in Spain, emergency services are desperately searching for a girl (some reports specify a young woman) who was dragged away by the Turvilla River in Sayalonga, Málaga. She was reportedly swept away while attempting to rescue her dog; while the dog was found alive, she remains missing despite an intensive search involving helicopters and drones.

The scale of displacement is unprecedented for the region this winter. In Morocco, the Ministry of the Interior confirmed that over 108,000 people have been evacuated, primarily in the Larache province, due to the surging Loukkos River. In Andalusia, Spain, approximately 4,000 people were forced to leave their homes as the mountain village of Grazalema recorded a staggering 400mm (16 inches) of rain in a single day—roughly what Madrid receives in an entire year. This extreme runoff has left 14 rivers and 10 dams at "extreme risk" of overflowing.

=== Storm Marta ===
Storm Marta
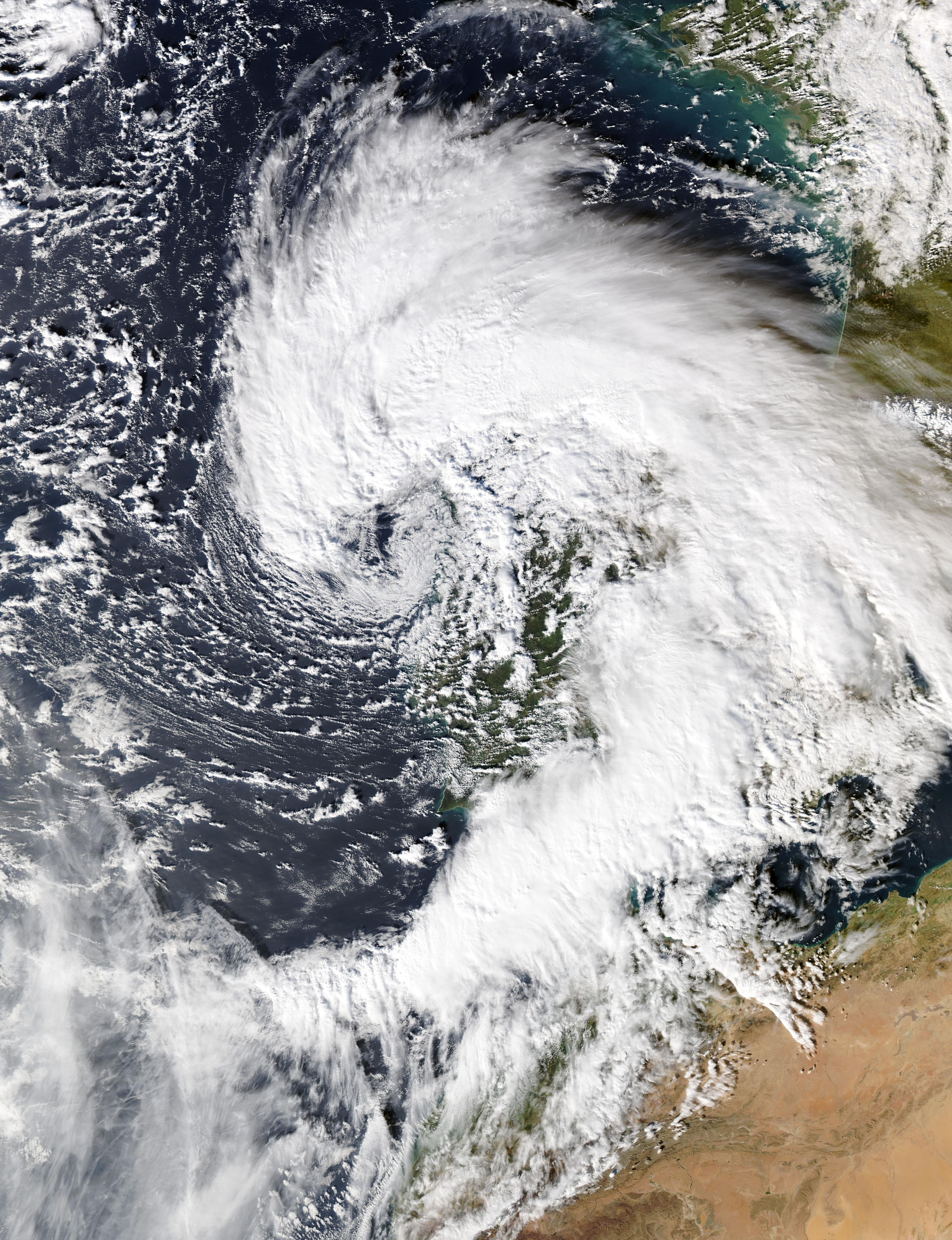

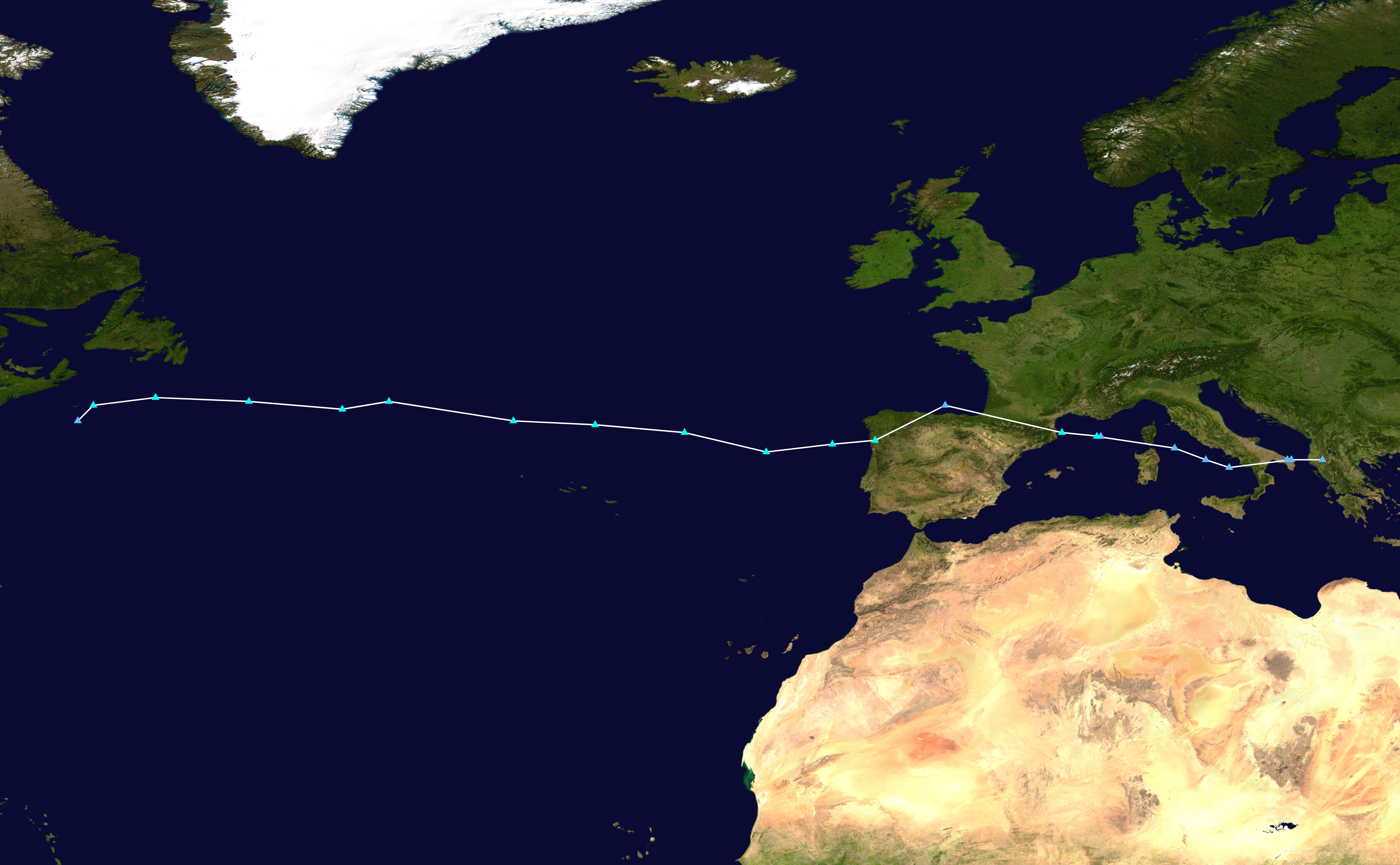
- Area affected: Spain, Portugal
- Date of impact: 5–8 February 2026
- Maximum wind gust: Unspecified
- Lowest pressure: 993 hPa (29.32 inHg)
- Fatalities: 2
- Power outages: Unspecified

==== Date named and background ====
Storm Marta was named on 5 February 2026 by IPMA.

It was associated with an atmospheric river from the Caribbean, which exacerbated flooding from previous storms.

==== Weather warnings issued ====
Storm Marta is forecast to reach Spain on 7 February, targeting regions already devastated by Storm Leonardo. AEMET issued yellow warnings across much of Andalusia, specifically in the Serranía de Ronda and the Guadiaro basin, where up to 60 mm (2.4 in) of rain could fall in just 12 hours. While these totals are lower than previous records, the extreme saturation of the ground sparked critical fears of renewed flash floods and landslides. Additionally, coastal areas are bracing for westerly wind gusts of up to 70 km/h (43 mph) and rough seas with waves reaching 3 m (9.8 ft) .

In Portugal, the IPMA warned that Storm Marta will arrive on the morning of 7 February, primarily threatening the southern and central regions with persistent, heavy rainfall and violent winds. Orange alerts are in place for the coast, where waves could reach 13 m (43 ft) south of Cape Carvoeiro, and for mountainous districts like Guarda and Vila Real, which anticipate over 25 cm (9.8 in) of snow. Authorities are on high alert for the Douro and Tagus rivers, which have already begun bursting their banks, potentially worsening the ongoing "state of calamity" that has already claimed lives and displaced thousands across 69 municipalities.

==== Storm impacts ====
Farmers in both countries report "catastrophic" damage, with thousands of hectares of crops like broccoli and citrus completely submerged under floodwaters. Portuguese Prime Minister Luís Montenegro warned that the provisional damage from the succession of storms has already exceeded €4 billion (£3.47 billion). Transportation is heavily disrupted, with nearly 170 roads closed across Spain and major rail services suspended in Portugal. Even professional sports have been affected, as the La Liga match between Sevilla and Girona was postponed due to safety risks.

Storm Marta has been linked to a new tragedy during its peak arrival. A snowplow driver died on Saturday, 7 February, after his vehicle plunged 20 meters (65 feet) down a slope in the El Pico mountain pass near Ávila, Spain during heavy snowfall. Additionally, a 46-year-old man drowned in a river at Campo Maior, in the Portalegre area of Portugal, as he was caught in the rising waters brought by the transition to Storm Marta.

=== Storm Nils (Ulrike) ===
Storm Nils
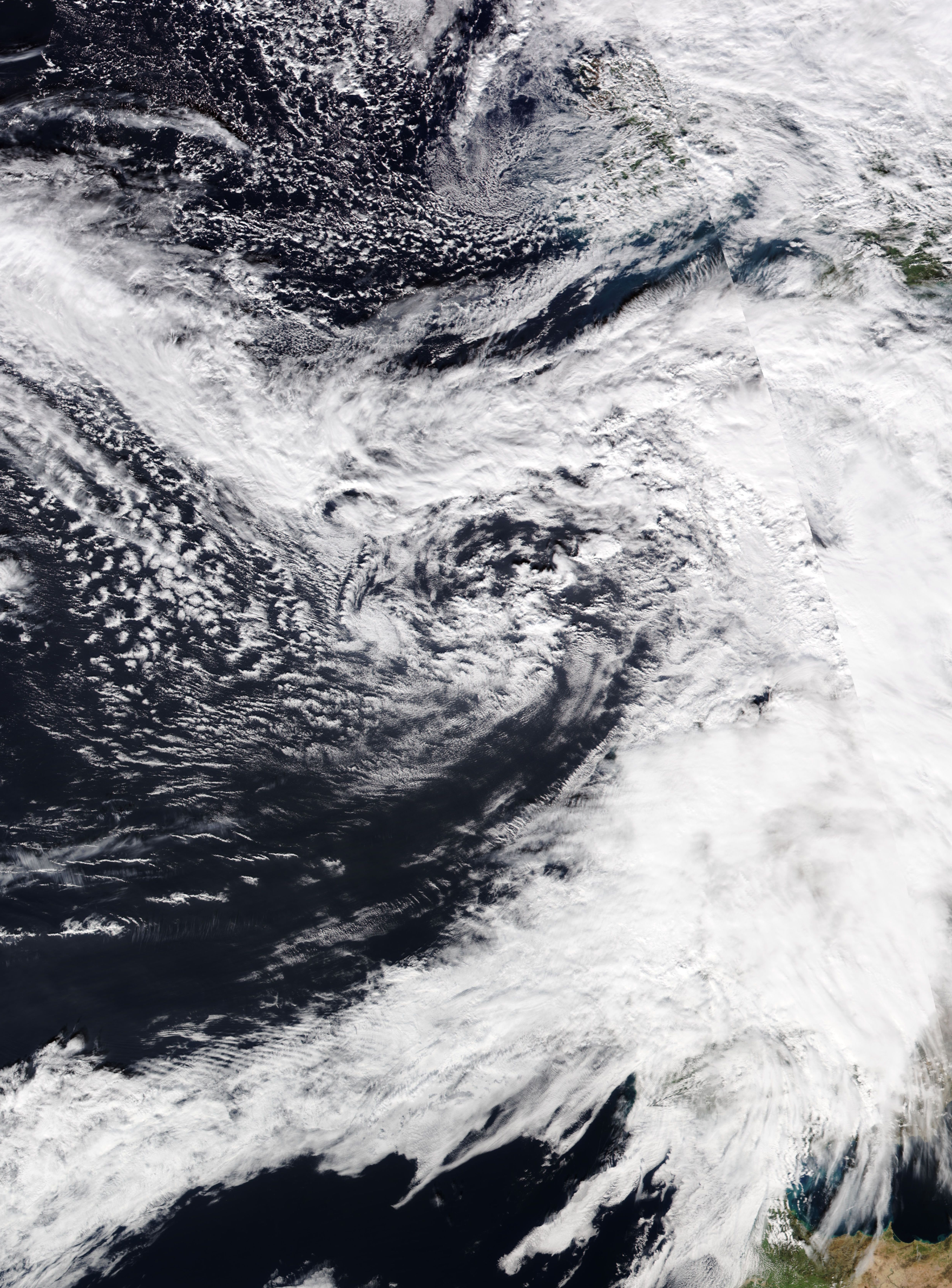

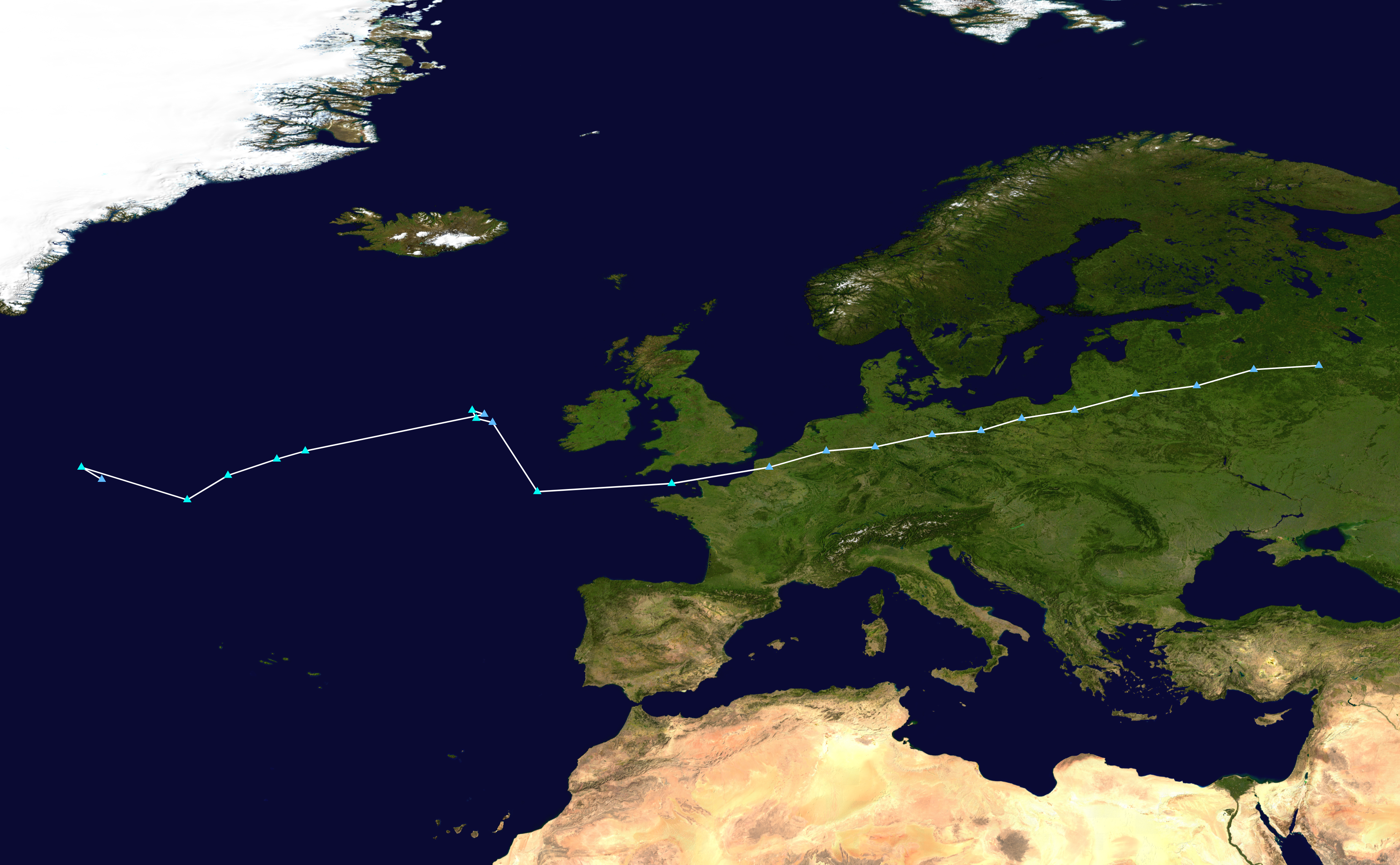
- Area affected: Spain, Portugal, France, Belgium, Netherlands, Germany
- Date of impact: 10–13 February 2026
- Maximum wind gust: 100 mph (45 m/s; 87 kn; 160 km/h)
- Fatalities: 2
- Power outages: Unspecified

==== Date named and background ====
Storm Nils was named by Météo-France on 10 February 2026, and was also named Ulrike by FUB that same day. This storm is not to be confused with Storm Nils in December 2025, which was named by the FUB.

==== Weather warnings issued ====
Spain and Portugal issued orange rain warnings for north-western and western parts respectively, with further flooding expected after a series of heavy rain events.

Météo-France placed 19 departments on orange alert as Storm Nils brought violent winds and heavy rain to the Atlantic coast and southwest regions. The Aude department was placed under a Red Alert for wind starting at 6 AM on 12 February, with "exceptional" gusts reaching up to 150–160 km/h across the plains and mountain peaks. Gironde and Lot-et-Garonne were upgraded to a Red Alert for flooding after the Vigicrues service warned of a "significant and long-lasting" event on soils that were already fully saturated.

==== Storm impacts ====
Storm Nils caused widespread devastation across Western Europe. In Spain, a driver was killed in the central region after being swept away by floodwaters, while a rescue worker in Portugal lost his life during an emergency operation. In Catalonia, authorities took the unprecedented step of closing all schools and suspending medical appointments for nearly half a million people to protect them from hurricane-force winds. In Barcelona, where at least six people were injured by falling debris and uprooted trees. Aviation was crippled as 91 flights were cancelled or diverted at El Prat airport due to gusts reaching 140 km/h. Structural damage was visible across the city, with iconic landmarks like the Sagrada Familia seen swaying violently in the wind, and rail services across the region were completely halted for safety. In France, the rain triggered a partial collapse of a major motorway in the south, following weeks of non-stop rain. The Garonne and Lot-et-Garonne regions were placed under Red Alerts for flooding as river levels reached historic peaks. Additionally, tens of thousands of homes across the Atlantic coast lost power as the wind downed transmission lines, adding to the multi-billion euro damage toll for the season. Gales of 162 km/h (100 mph) were recorded in parts of France. Two people were killed in Landes and Tarn-et-Garonne.

=== Storm Oriana (Viviana) ===
Storm Oriana (Viviana)
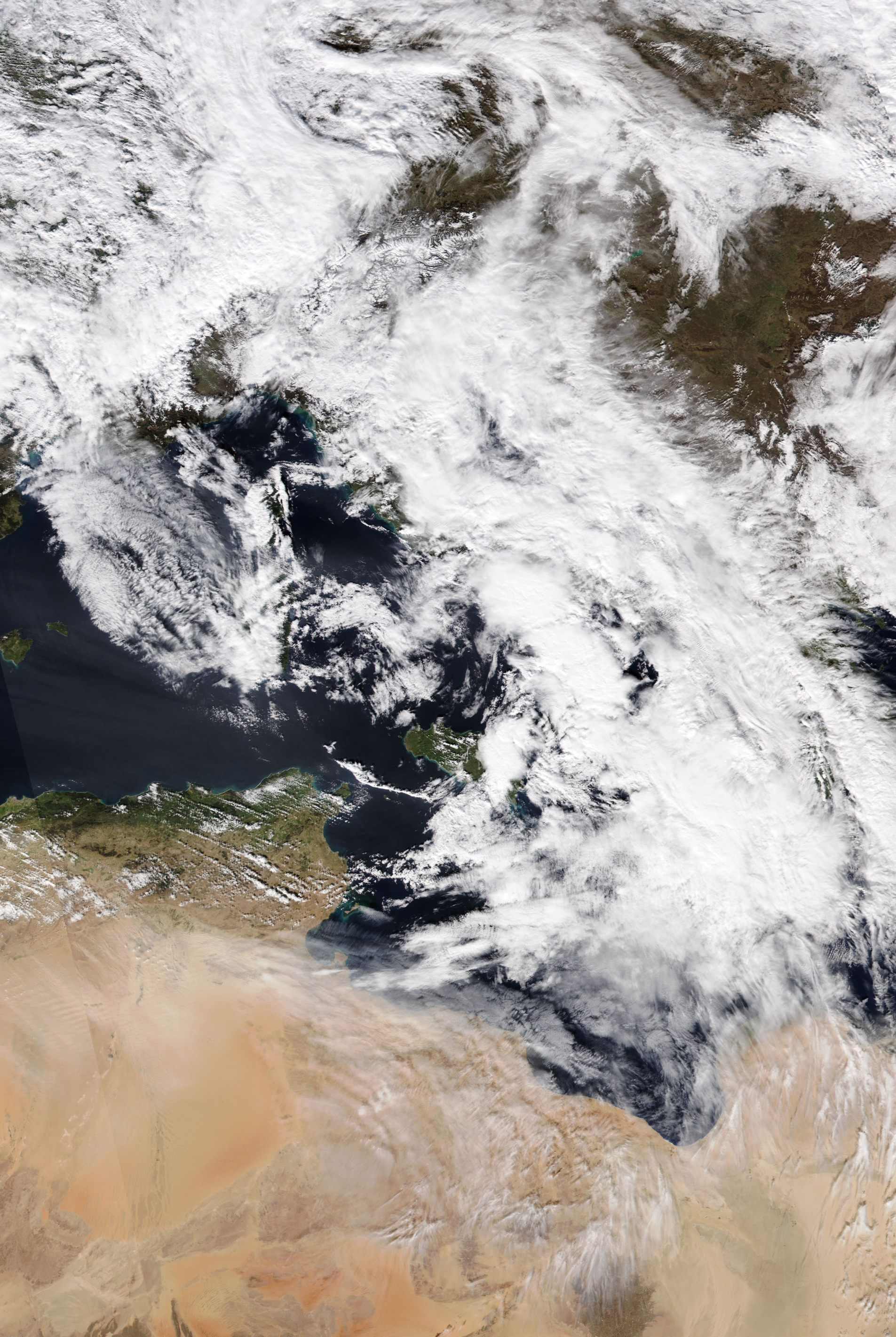

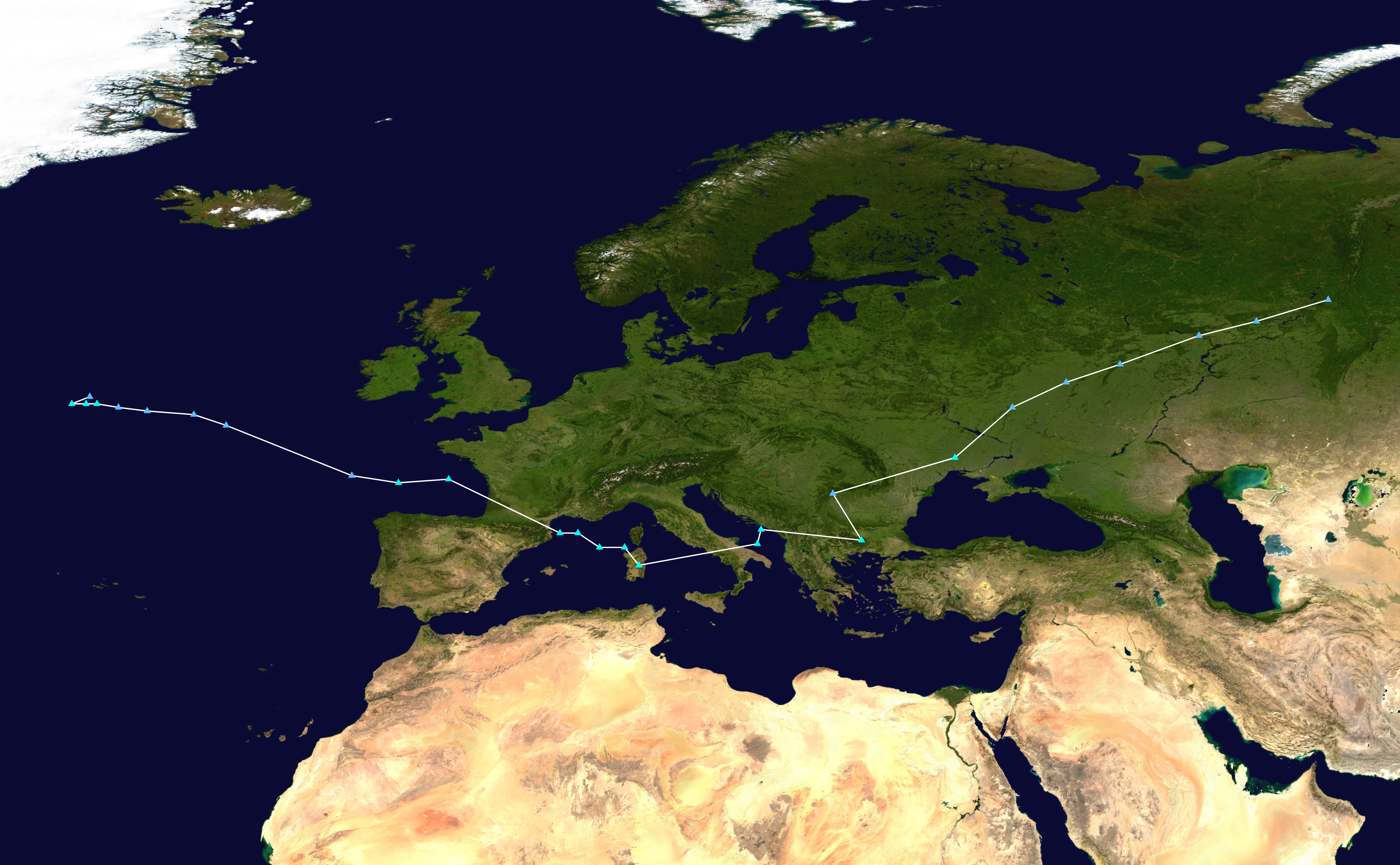
- Area affected: Spain, Portugal, France, Algeria, Morocco, Italy, Tunisia, the Balkans, Romania, Moldova, Ukraine, Russia
- Date of impact: 12–16 February 2026
- Maximum wind gust: Unspecified
- Lowest pressure: Unspecified
- Fatalities: 1
- Power outages: Unspecified

==== Date named and background ====
Storm Oriana was named by AEMET on 12 February 2026; it was named Viviana by the FUB on the same day.

==== Weather warnings issued ====
In Spain, AEMET issued a Red Alert for the Basque coast for waves of 10 metres. Orange alerts for rain and wind are active in Cádiz, the Balearic Islands, and Catalonia. Yellow warnings for wind cover Madrid and Murcia. The government of Aragon activated a flood plan for the Gallego River. For Portugal IPMA placed 15 districts under a Yellow Alert for rain. Wind gusts reached 80 km/h as the front crossed the territory. A Red Alert is in effect for the Tagus River for 48 hours. Dam discharges exceed 6,000 cubic metres per second in the Lezíria region.

Météo-France maintained Orange Alerts for departments in the southwest for flooding and wind. The Gironde and Aude regions remain under vigilance due to soil saturation. Winds continue along the Atlantic and Mediterranean coasts. The Civil Protection issued Orange and Yellow Alerts for 13 regions. Warnings focus on the Tyrrhenian coast, Lazio, and Calabria. The Servizio Meteorologico has issued red rain warnings for the regions of Piemonte, Toscana, and Lazio as Oriana moves into the central Mediterranean.

The Hellenic National Meteorological Service issued Orange Alerts for the Cyclades and Dodecanese islands due to gale-force winds reaching Force 9. Yellow Alerts for rain and thunderstorms are active for Epirus and the Ionian Islands. Coastal authorities also placed restrictions on small vessels in the Saronic Gulf because of high sea swells. A Red Alert is in effect for the Adriatic coast of Croatia, where winds are forecast to exceed 130 km/h. Orange Alerts for snow and ice cover the mountains of Montenegro, Bosnia and Herzegovina, and Western Serbia, creating difficult travel conditions. Yellow Alerts for rain are active in Albania and North Macedonia as river levels rise. The Ukrainian Hydrometeorological Center issued Yellow Alerts for snow and ice in the Lviv and Volyn regions. Yellow Alerts for wind are also active for the Odesa region, with gusts reaching 80 km/h along the Black Sea coast. A general snow advisory remains in place for Kyiv and central districts as temperatures continue to drop.

==== Storm impacts ====
In Barcelona, a 46-year-old woman died on 12 February when the roof of an industrial building collapsed due to hurricane-force winds. Over 90 people were injured across Catalonia during the peak of the storm, with ten individuals hospitalised, including one person in critical condition following a lamppost collapse.

=== Storm Pedro (Yael) ===
Storm Pedro (Yael)
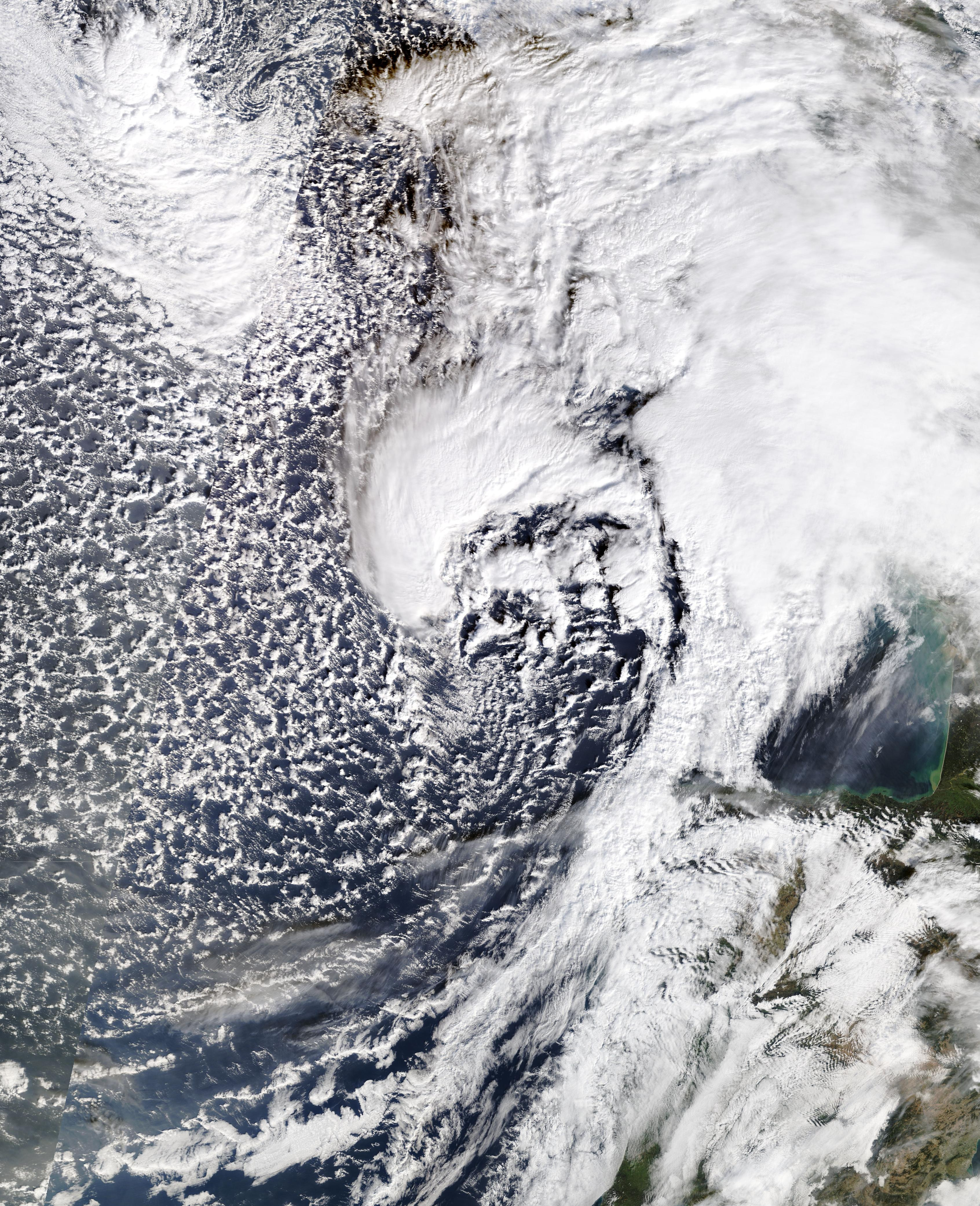

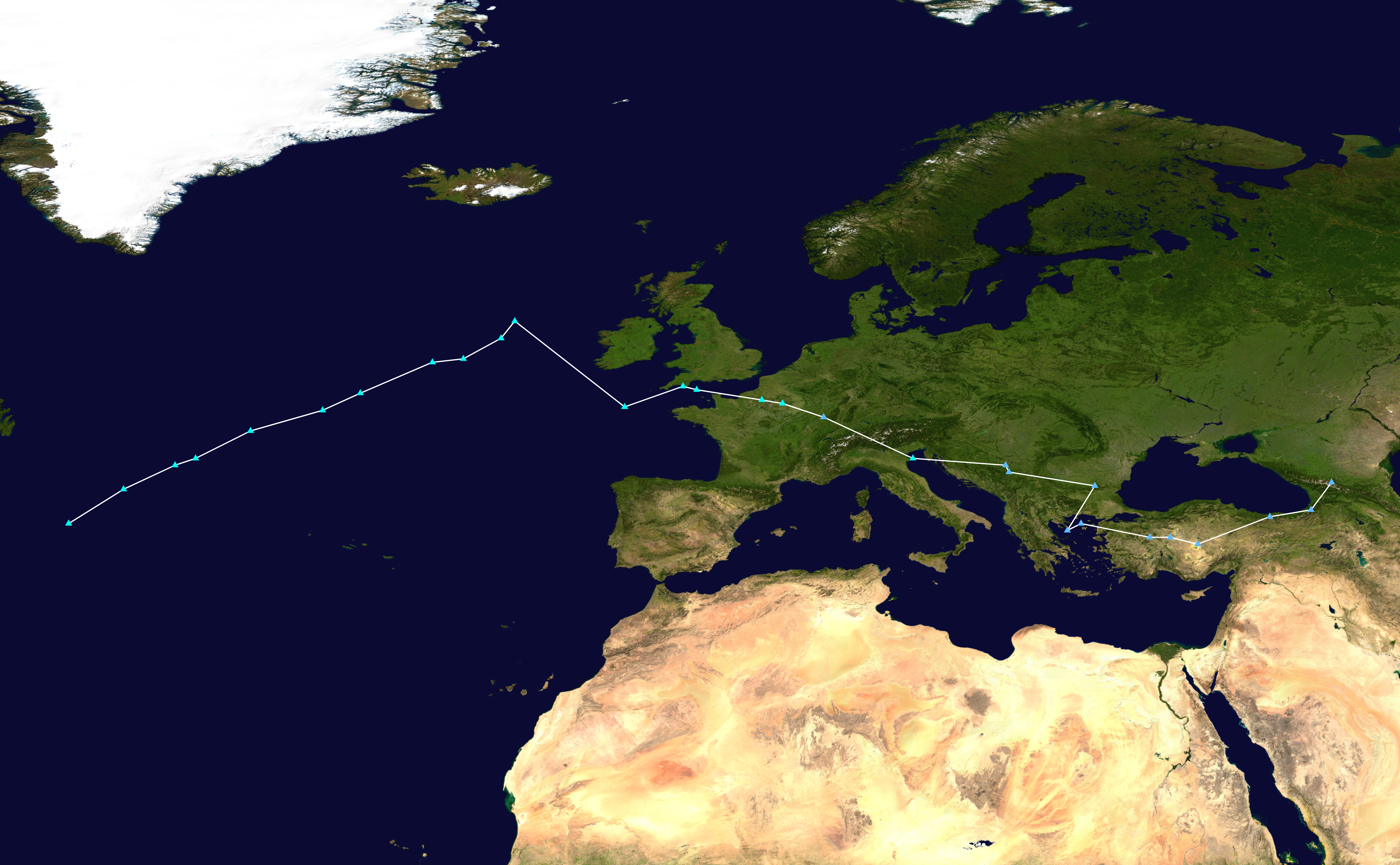
- Area affected: United Kingdom, France, Spain, Portugal, Germany, Italy
- Date of impact: 17–20 February 2026
- Maximum wind gust: 81 mph (130 km/h; 36 m/s; 70 kn) at Ebro Delta, Spain
- Lowest pressure: 983 hPa (29.03 inHg)
- Fatalities: 1 missing
- Power outages: Unspecified

==== Date named and background ====
Storm Pedro was named by Meteo France on 17 February 2026 and was assigned the name Yael by the FUB a day later.

Pedro formed in the west of Europe, and was forecast to bring snow to southern parts of England and Wales, with rain and strong winds, with heavy rainfall and strong winds to much of France.

==== Weather warnings issued ====
The Met Office issued a yellow snow warning for western England and inland parts of Wales, where 2–5 cm of snow could accumulate quite widely above 150–200 metres, with perhaps as much as 10–15 cm above 250–300 metres in mid and southeast Wales, as well as Herefordshire and Shropshire. Some small accumulations of snow, typically less than 2 cm, are possible to lower elevations, especially from later Wednesday evening into the early hours of Thursday morning. There is also strong east to northeasterly winds will accompany the wet weather, which could exacerbate impacts in places.

A yellow rain warning was also issued for entire south coast for England as well as Cornwall and Devon, where heavy rain will affect southern parts of England during Wednesday and overnight into Thursday, whilst some snow is also likely over higher ground, chiefly during Wednesday night. 10–20 mm of rain is expected quite widely with a few places near the south coast seeing 20–30 mm and perhaps as much as 50 mm over Dartmoor. There is also the risk of large waves around southern coastal parts.

Meteo France has issued several levels of vigilance as Storm Pedro moves across the country. Orange flood warnings are in effect for multiple departments in the Southwest and West, specifically targeting the Garonne and Adour river basins where water levels remain high. A wide area of Western and Southern France is under orange rain-flood warnings, while high-altitude regions in the Alps and Pyrenees face elevated avalanche alerts. Additionally, a yellow alert for snow and ice is active for a corridor stretching from Normandy through Île-de-France, including Paris.

Spain was under yellow and orange alerts for high winds reaching 90 km/h and coastal waves in 13 regions including Malaga and the Balearic Islands, while Portugal has issued yellow warnings for six coastal districts, including Porto and Aveiro, due to 5-metre waves and continued rain in the north. Germany is facing yellow alerts for persistent rainfall and localised flooding in western regions following Storm Pedro's passage, and Italy has activated yellow and orange warnings across 13 regions, including Lazio and Calabria, for potential landslides, heavy snow in the Alps, and intense thunderstorms.

==== Storm impacts ====
A 53-year-old man has been reported missing in Western France after his boat capsized, while at least four departments are on red alert due to the storm. Major aviation hubs like Paris Charles de Gaulle and Nice are managing hundreds of flight delays and dozens of cancellations. In the UK, the Met Office has maintained yellow warnings for snow, ice, and rain, with significant disruptions reported on the M4 motorway as a result of a fallen tree, and throughout parts of Wales and the Midlands due to heavy snowfall on higher ground.

In Spain, Storm Pedro has brought hurricane-force wind gusts of up to 130 km/h to the Ebro Delta and 110 km/h in regions like Tarragona, leading to the cancellation of major public events and disrupting coastal travel with waves reaching seven metres. In Portugal, the storm hit already saturated ground, causing immediate localised flooding that blocked major roads and added to infrastructure damages that have exceeded €4 billion this month alone. In Germany, the system's heavy rainfall has flooded numerous homes and villages in western regions and caused significant rail disruptions, while also triggering cascading flight delays at major hubs like Berlin. In Italy, the storm has severely impacted aviation with hundreds of flight delays and cancellations at Florence and Milan airports, while also bringing dangerous snow to the Alps and intense rainfall that triggered a fatal landslide in the Lazio region.

=== Storm Regina ===
Storm Regina
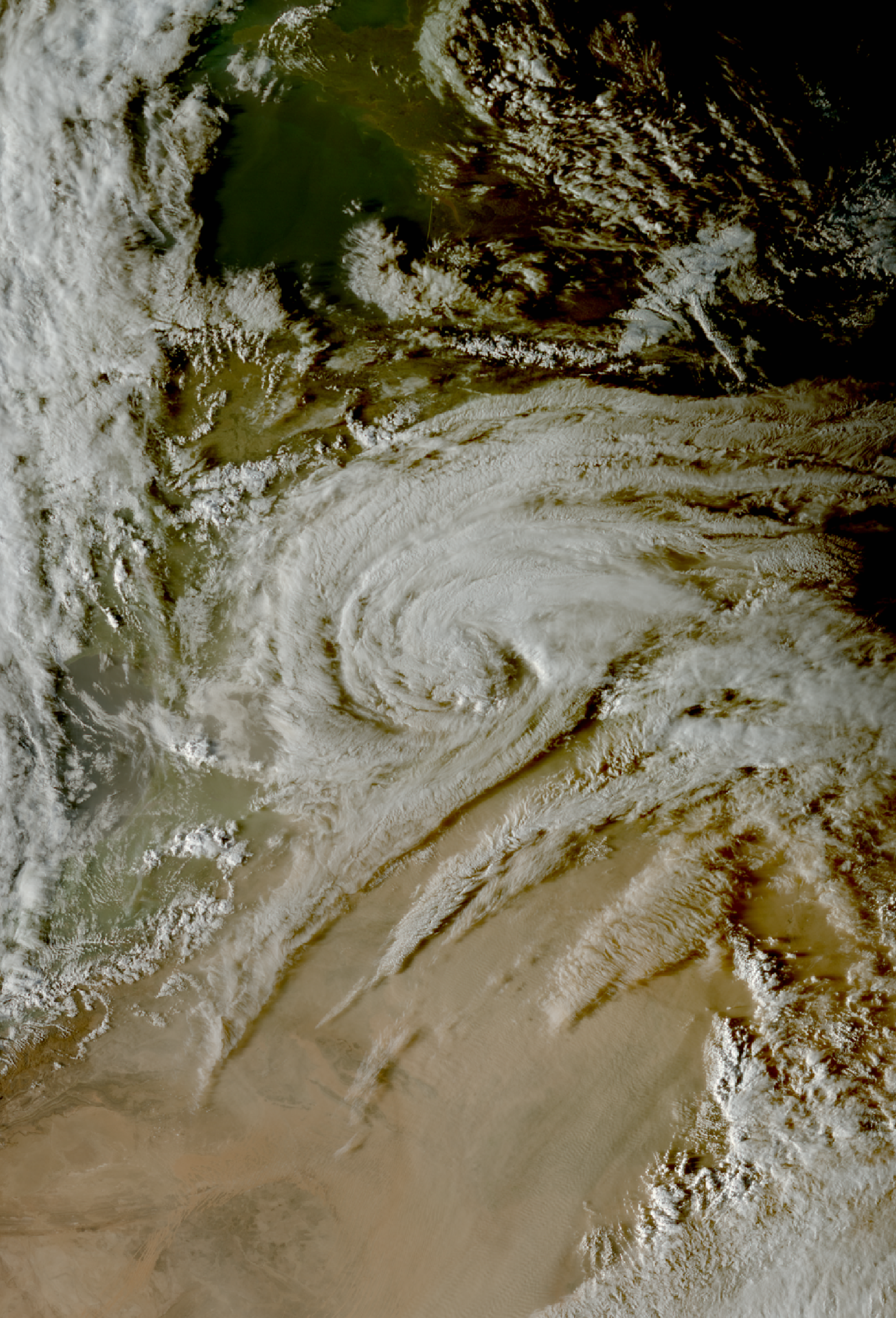

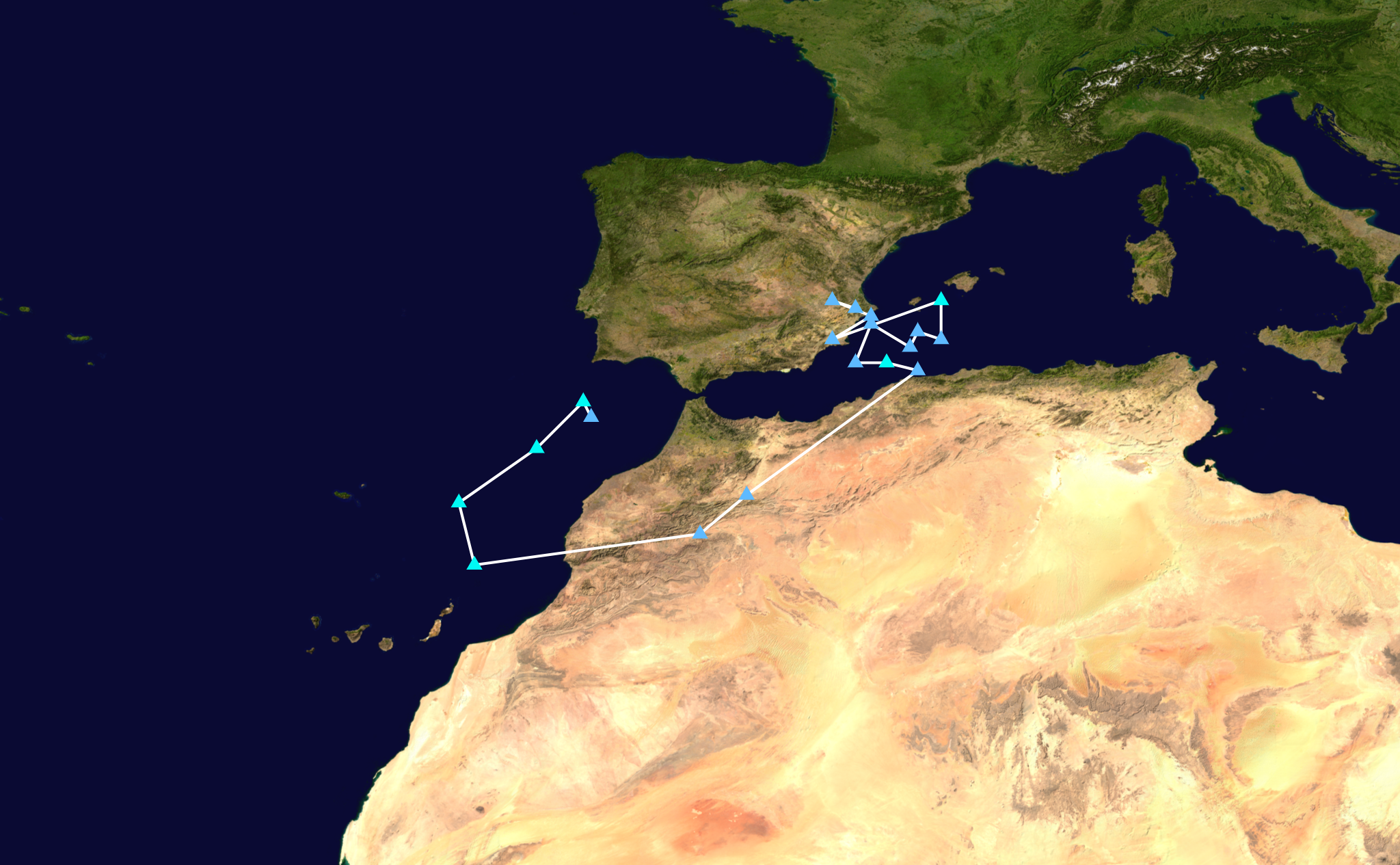
- Area affected: Spain, Canary Islands, Portugal, Madeira Archipelago, Morocco
- Date of impact: 1–7 March 2026
- Maximum wind gust: 75 mph (34 m/s; 65 kn; 121 km/h) at Pico do Areeiro, Madeira
- Lowest pressure: 1,000 hPa (29.53 inHg)
- Fatalities: Unspecified
- Power outages: Unspecified

==== Date named and background ====
Storm Regina was named by IPMA on 1 March 2026. It formed as a cut off low near the Canary Islands, just off shore of Morocco on 3 March.

==== Weather warnings issued ====
The Portuguese Institute of the Sea and Atmosphere (IPMA) has issued Orange Warnings for the Madeira Archipelago due to extreme wind gusts reaching 120 km/h and "very rough" seas with maximum waves potentially hitting 11 metres. On the mainland, Yellow Warnings are active for the southern regions, including the Algarve and Setúbal, for heavy rain and thunderstorms that may include hail and rare, isolated tornadoes.

Spain's State Meteorological Agency (AEMET) has raised warnings to Orange for the Canary Islands (specifically Lanzarote) as waves of up to seven metres are expected to batter the coastline. On the mainland, Yellow Warnings for "very strong gusts" and stormy seas have been activated for the Costa del Sol and Malaga, where "muddy rain" (calima) is expected to fall as the storm sucks Saharan dust into its system.

The General Directorate of Meteorology (DGM) has issued Orange Alerts for several mountain provinces as heavy snow is forecast to hit the Atlas range starting Tuesday. Additionally, severe wind warnings (75–90 km/h) and sandstorm alerts remain active for the southern and eastern provinces as the storm tracks across North Africa, pulling vast quantities of desert dust toward the Mediterranean.

==== Storm impacts ====
In Madeira, the storm has effectively paralyzed international travel, with over 50 flights cancelled at Funchal Airport due to crosswinds reaching 80 km/h, which are forecast to intensify to 120 km/h by Tuesday. On the mainland, the storm is bringing heavy rain to the Algarve and southern regions, where authorities are monitoring the Guadiana River following emergency dam releases that have already put riverside communities on high municipal alert. In southern Portugal, the storm has been officially linked to a significant degradation in air quality as it transports a dense Saharan dust plume, prompting health advisories for sensitive groups in the Algarve.

In the Canary Islands, Storm Regina has forced the upgrade of coastal warnings to Orange for Lanzarote, where waves are expected to reach up to seven meters, while the rest of the archipelago faces persistent heavy rainfall and gusts of 70 km/h. On the mainland, the storm is sucking Saharan dust into its circulation, causing "muddy rain" and significantly reduced visibility across Malaga and the Costa del Sol.

In Morocco, the storm acted as an "atmospheric pump," generating a massive Saharan sandstorm that has grounded domestic flights to Laayoune and caused power outages in the Souss-Massa region by toppling argan and palm trees onto medium-voltage lines. In the Atlas Mountains, the storm is expected to transition into heavy snowfall, leading to orange-level alerts for mountain provinces as temperatures plummet.

=== Storm Samuel (Jolina) ===
Storm Samuel (Jolina)
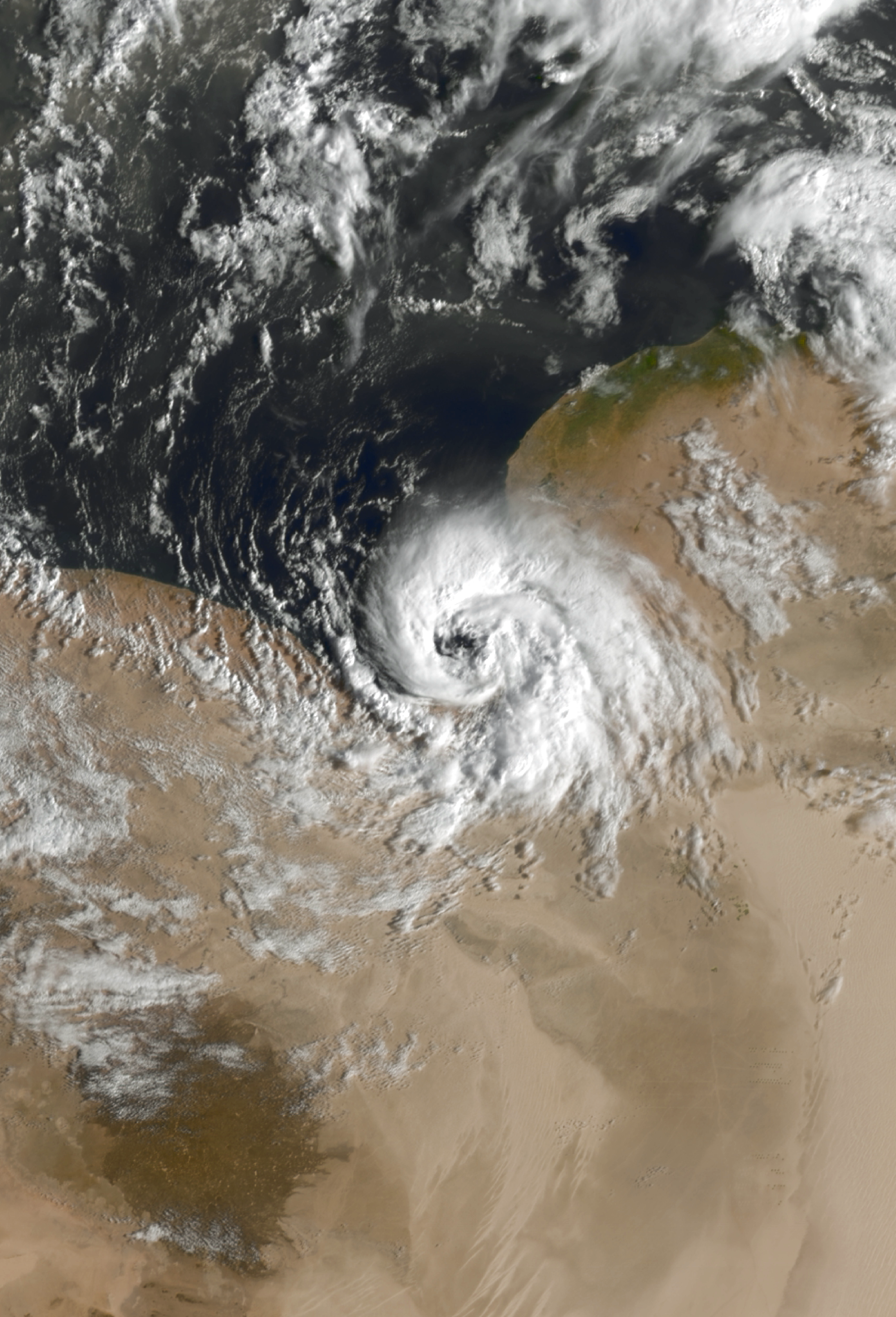

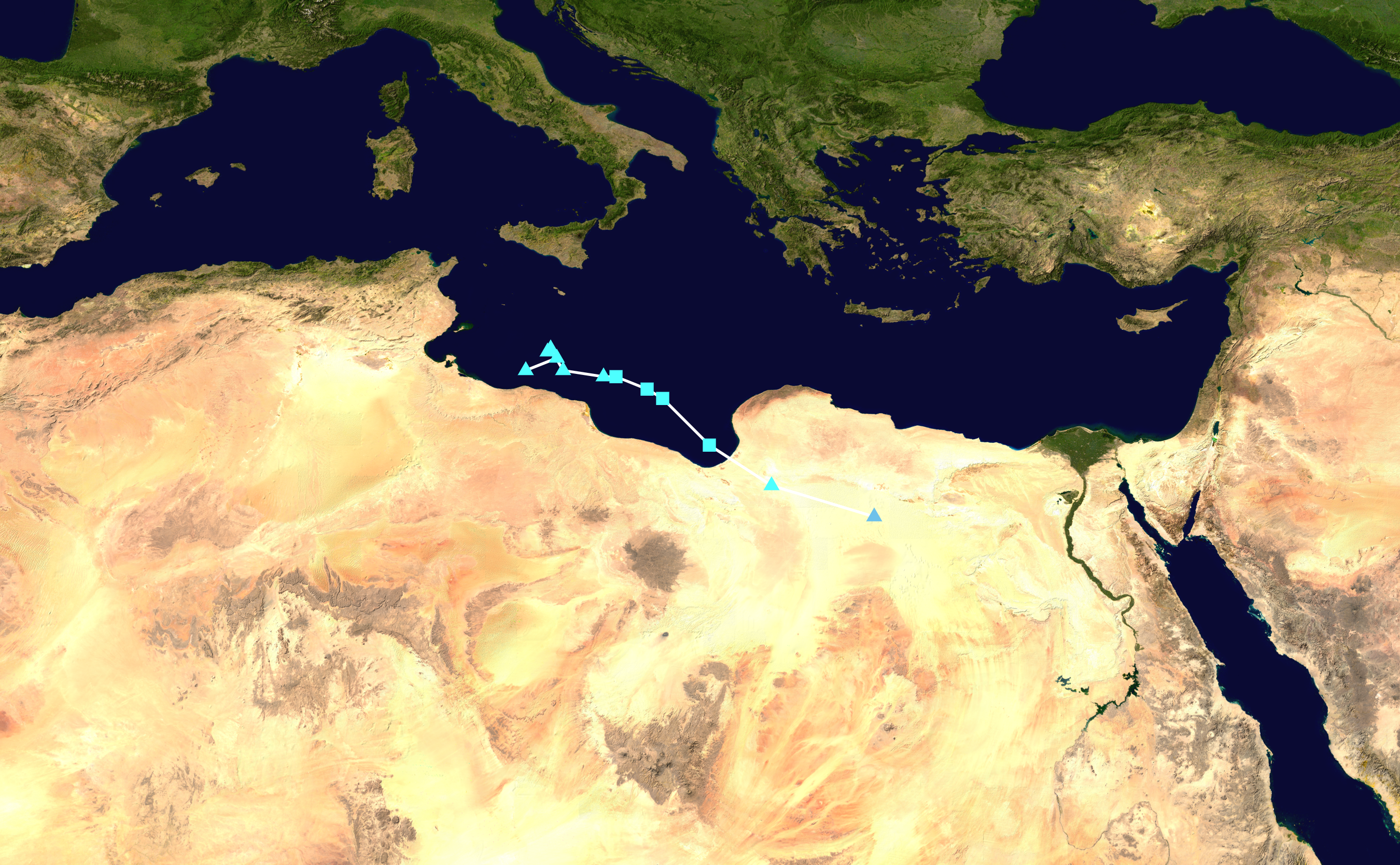
- Area affected: Spain, Portugal, Malta, Italy, Greece, Libya, Egypt
- Date of impact: 15–19 March 2026
- Maximum wind gust: 100 mph (45 m/s; 87 kn; 160 km/h) at Barcelona and Girona, Spain
- Lowest pressure: 989 hPa (29.21 inHg)
- Fatalities: 1
- Injuries: 4
- Power outages: Unspecified

==== Date named and background ====
Storm Samuel was named by the National Meteorological Service of Andorra on 15 March, and named Jolina by the FUB on 17 March. Samuel consisted of an eye-like feature alongside a warm core signature, despite this, no Mediterranean National Meteorological Service has officially classified Storm Samuel as a medicane as of yet, though the CIMSS and Meteored España, a local specialized Spanish weather agency, have noted the possibility of its hybrid characteristics indicating a transition to a medicane. Alongside this, an ASCAT pass recorded 1-minute sustained winds of 45 mph (72 km/h) a day before landfall.

==== Weather warnings ====
Catalunya and the Balearic Islands were under red alerts due to accompanying rough seas and wind from Samuel.

==== Storm impacts ====
Samuel brought strong wind gusts across numerous areas of Spain, with the strongest recorded being 100 mph (160 km/h) near Barcelona and Girona province. Four people were injured due to the impacts related to Storm Samuel. Samuel caused a massive advection of Saharan dust to plume out over the Mediterranean Sea. Significant flooding occurred in Tripoli, Libya as strong winds and heavy rainfall led to stranded vehicles and individuals. One person died while attempting to rescue people trapped in floodwaters in Tajoura.

=== Storm Therese ===
Storm Therese
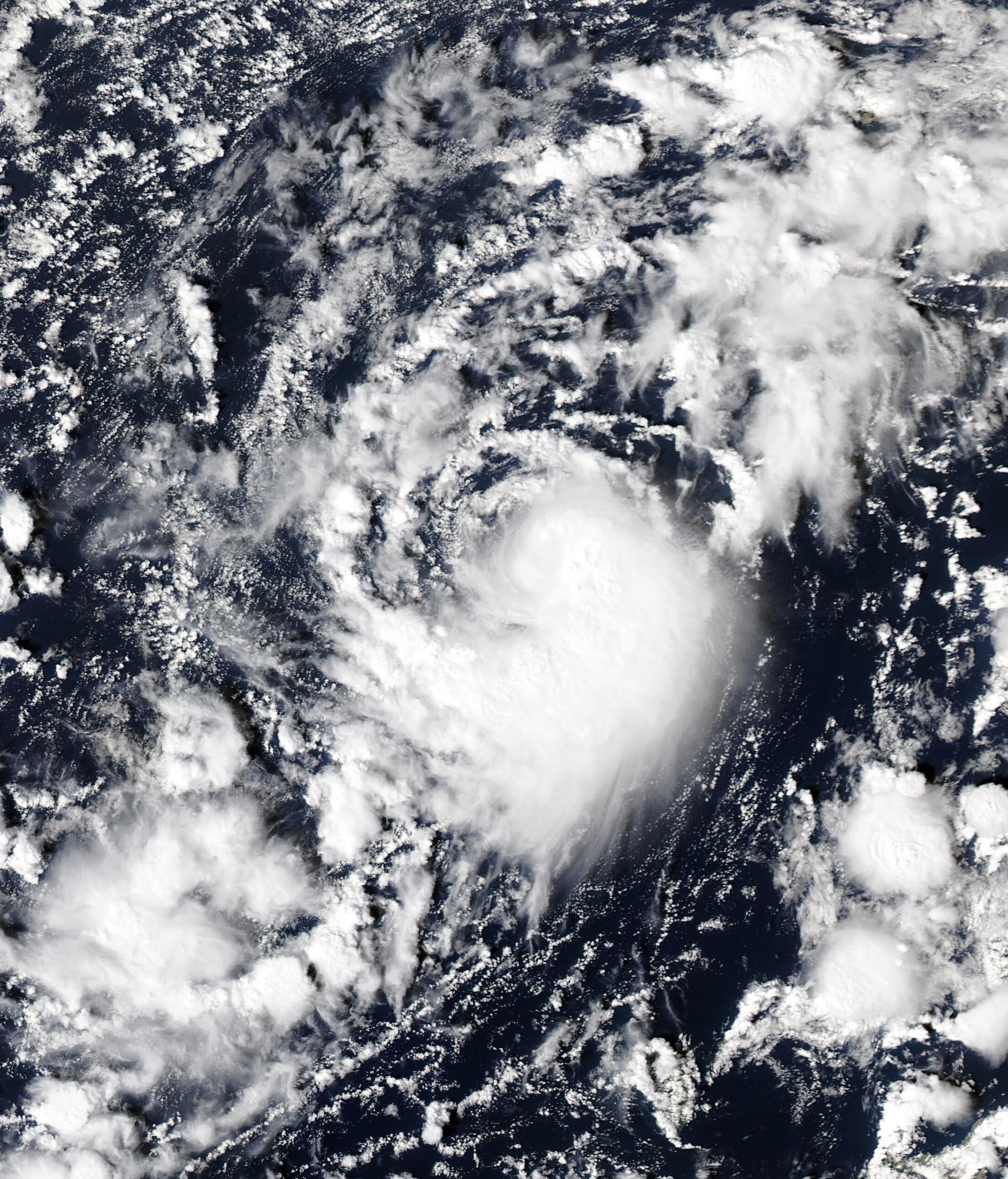

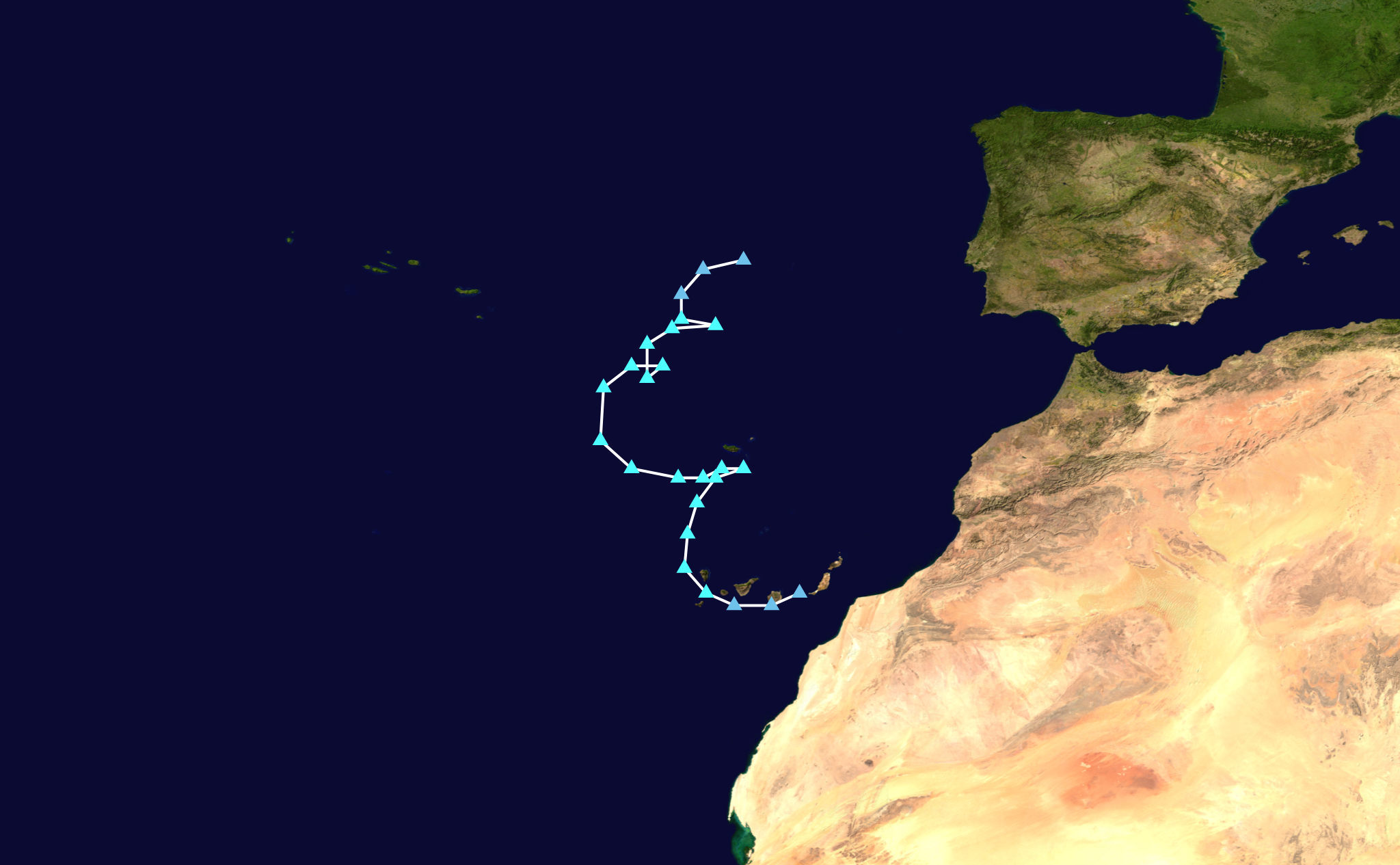
- Area affected: Spain, Portugal, Canary Islands
- Date of impact: 16–24 March 2026
- Maximum wind gust: Unspecified
- Lowest pressure: 982 hPa (29.00 inHg)
- Fatalities: Unspecified
- Power outages: Unspecified

==== Date named and background ====
Storm Therese was named by the IPMA on 16 March. Unlike typical Atlantic storms that sweep quickly towards Europe, Therese became a slow-moving, quasi-stationary system, drawing in significant moisture and Saharan dust, which created a rare combination of orange skies and intense precipitation.

==== Weather warnings issued ====
In the Canary Islands, the Tenerife Island Council issued its Island Emergency Plan with the decision coming forth from Therese being forecasted to become the worst storm to affect the Canary Islands in over a decade.

Comprehensive weather alerts were activated across the Macaronesia region starting on 18 March. AEMET issued Amber and Yellow Warnings for the entire Canary archipelago, focusing on extreme rainfall, gale-force winds, and significant coastal swells. In Tenerife, the Island Council activated its Island Emergency Plan (PEIN) at 15:00 on Wednesday, anticipating a "multi-day severe weather episode." In Fuerteventura, authorities issued specific alerts for "coastal overtopping" due to the coincidence of 5-metre waves and spring tides. By 20 March, emergency protocols were expanded to include the closure of schools, nurseries, and outdoor recreational areas across five islands.

==== Storm impacts ====
The impacts of Therese were severe and widespread, characterised by a dramatic contrast in weather conditions. The Canary Islands recorded over 300 emergency incidents, ranging from landslides to localised flash floods. Mount Teide was blanketed in heavy snow and ice, leading to the closure of the National Park above 1,800 metres, while lower elevations faced rainfall totals reaching up to 400 mm in isolated mountainous areas, more than the average annual rainfall for the region. Travel was heavily disrupted, with over 26 flights cancelled and multiple ferry services suspended between the islands. In a notable incident, emergency services rescued three individuals from a ravine after they refused to evacuate despite the escalating flood risk.

=== Storm Deborah ===
Storm Deborah
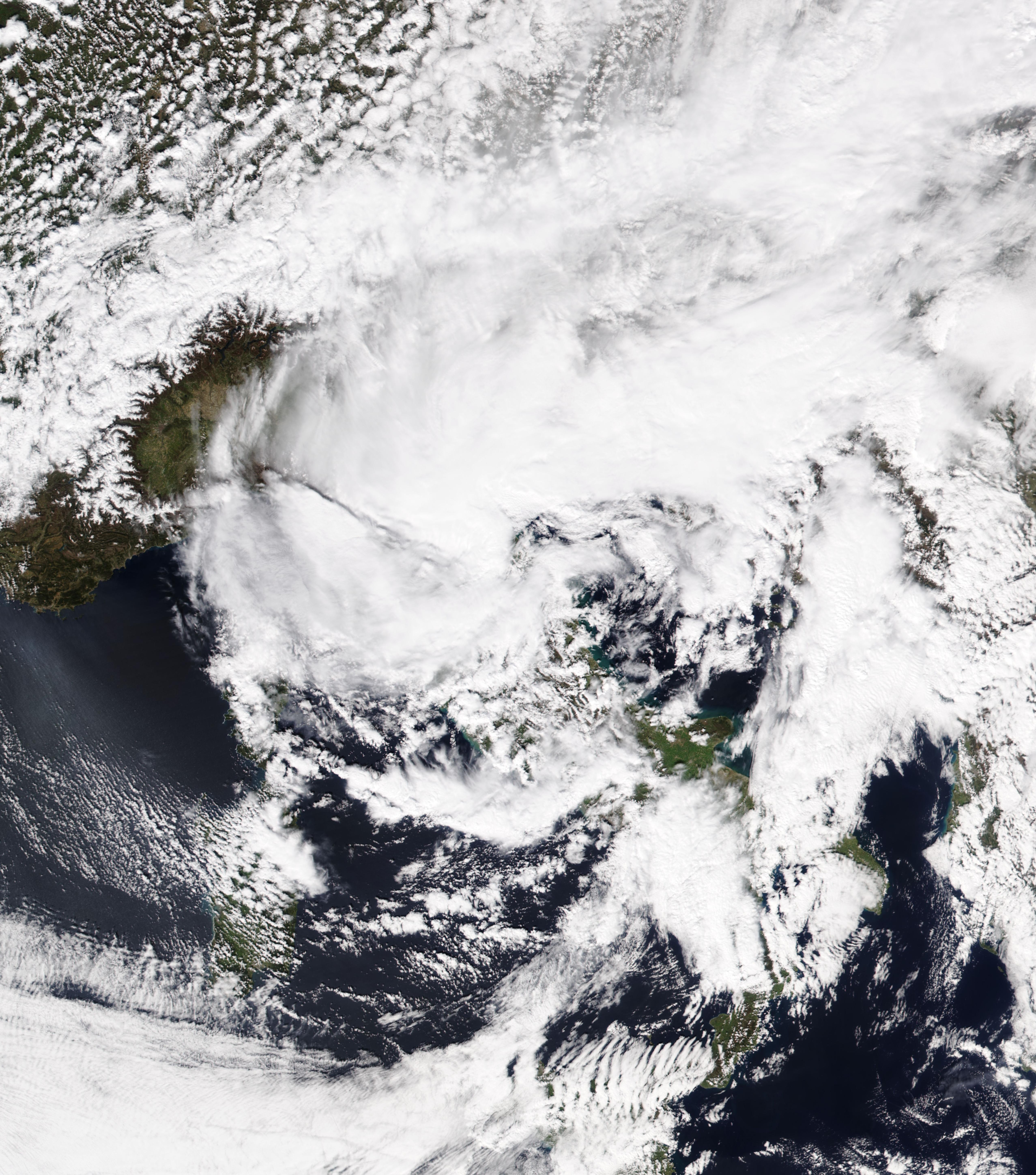

- Area affected: Italy, Croatia, the Balkans, Greece
- Date of impact: 25–30 March 2026
- Maximum wind gust: 118 mph (53 m/s; 103 kn; 190 km/h) at Ossola, Italy
- Lowest pressure: 987 hPa (29.15 inHg)
- Fatalities: 2
- Power outages: Unspecified

==== Date named and background ====
Deborah was named on 25 March 2026 by the Italian Servizio Meteorologico, ending a more than 4 month long streak without a name from the central Mediterranean group.

==== Weather warnings issued ====
In Italy, orange alert were issued for the regions of Lazio and Calabria. This warning highlights a high risk of "hydrogeological" events, including flash floods and landslides, as the storm is expected to dump significant rainfall on already saturated ground. Residents in Rome and southern coastal towns have been cautioned against gale-force winds and intense lightning, while emergency services remain on standby for potential river overflows in the Cosenza area.

Across the Adriatic, Croatia's DHMZ has issued a widespread yellow alert for wind and maritime hazards. The most severe conditions are expected along the Velebit Channel and the Kvarner region, where "Bura" (NE) gusts are forecast to exceed 85 km/h. Authorities have warned mariners that these conditions will produce dangerous wave heights for small craft and may lead to the suspension of several ferry lines connecting the Dalmatian islands to the mainland. Red wind warnings were also issued for a time in Slovenia. Yellow wind warnings were issued by IHMK in Kosovo.

==== Storm impacts ====
Storm Deborah has emerged as the most violent spring storm in years, battering Northern Italy with hurricane-force Foehn winds reaching up to 190 km/h in the Piedmontese valleys of Pinerolese and Ossola. Beyond the extreme wind damage and structural risks, the system has triggered a high tornado risk across the eastern Po Valley—specifically in Venice, Treviso, and Padova—while late-season snow and frost threaten to devastate the region's blossoming orchards and vineyards.

In Athens and the broader Attica region, the storm intensified on Friday afternoon with heavy rain and thunderstorms that were particularly severe in northern and western suburbs like Malakasa and Elefsina, though most central areas saw lighter initial totals. The system has caused significant transport disruptions and brought unseasonable mountain snow to Epirus and Macedonia.

Severe storms across Croatia on 26–27 March 2026, caused widespread injury and infrastructure damage as winds reached 120 km/h alongside heavy snowfall. In the capital, Zagreb, emergency services responded to approximately 1,000 calls, reporting injuries to several residents caused by falling trees and debris, with preliminary assessments showing damage to 150 vehicles and over 50 roofs. Transport was severely impacted, including a rail accident in northern Croatia where a train derailed after hitting a fallen tree, resulting in two injuries. Additionally, the national power company reported that 18,000 people were left without electricity due to grid failures, leading authorities to close schools and urge citizens to remain indoors.

=== Storm Erminio ===
Storm Erminio
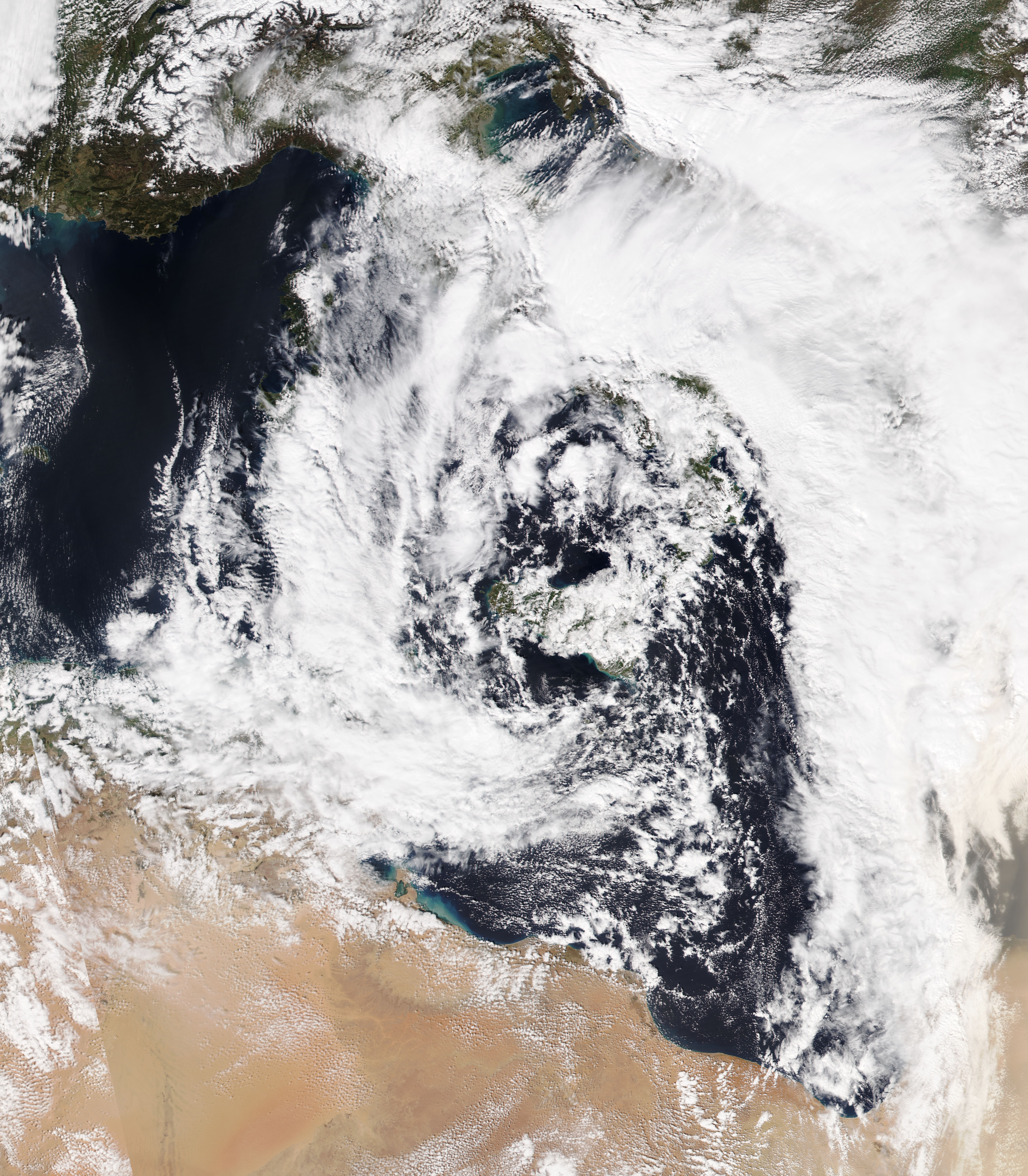

- Area affected: Italy, Greece, Croatia, Tunisia, Cyprus, Montenegro, Albania, Israel, Lebanon, Turkey
- Date of impact: 30 March–4 April 2026
- Maximum wind gust: Unspecified
- Lowest pressure: 987 hPa (29.15 inHg)
- Fatalities: 1
- Power outages: Unspecified

==== Date named and background ====
Storm Erminio was named on 31 March 2026 by the Italian Servizio Meteorologico.

==== Weather warnings issued ====
National meteorological services across Southern Europe issued a series of tiered warnings as the system's trajectory became clear. In Italy, the Protezione Civile elevated the risk level to a Red Alert for the Adriatic coastline, specifically targeting the regions of Abruzzo and Molise. This was due to forecast wind gusts exceeding 130 km/h and the threat of an "extreme coastal surge" that risked flooding low-lying maritime infrastructure. Meanwhile, Orange Alerts were maintained for the major metropolitan hubs of Rome and Naples, where severe thunderstorms and intense downpours created a significant risk for flash flooding in urban areas.

In Croatia, the DHMZ (State Meteorological and Hydrological Service) issued a Red Wind Warning for the Velebit Channel and Southern Dalmatia. The primary threat was hurricane-force Bura (bora) winds, which were predicted to reach speeds of up to 150 km/h. These extreme conditions led to the total suspension of ferry services between the islands and the mainland to ensure maritime safety. Authorities warned of significant building damage and risks to transport along the coastal D8 state road.

The Hellenic National Meteorological Service (HNMS) has issued an Emergency Bulletin of Dangerous Weather Phenomena for the storm system Erminio, which is expected to sweep across Greece on Wednesday, 1 April, and Thursday, 2 April 2026. This system is moving southeastward from the western Mediterranean and is forecast to bring prolonged and intense rainfall, powerful thunderstorms, and the possibility of local hailstorms. According to the bulletin, gale-force winds reaching 8 to 9 Beaufort will prevail in eastern regions on Wednesday, with local gusts in the Dodecanese potentially reaching a severe 10 Beaufort. On Wednesday, 1 April, authorities placed Attica (including Athens), the Peloponnese, Evia, and Thessaly under Red Warnings as flash floods and overflowing streams occurred from the late morning. Orange Warnings were also in effect for the Ionian Islands, the Cyclades, and the eastern Aegean, while heavy snowfall was recorded in the mountains of Epirus and Macedonia. By Thursday, 2 April, the severe weather shifted toward the southern Peloponnese and Crete, which remained under Red Warnings throughout the night. The Dodecanese faced a dual threat of hurricane-force winds and torrential rain, prompting residents to secure property and avoid non-essential travel until the system cleared.

==== Storm impacts ====
One fatality was reported in Greece as Storm Erminio moved through the region, including a 55-year-old Polish worker in Nea Makri in East Attica, after being swept away by floodwaters and trapped beneath a car.

In Greece, the most notable impact has been the near-total shutdown of maritime transport. Gale-force winds reaching 9 to 10 Beaufort in the Aegean Sea forced the suspension of most ferry departures from the port of Piraeus, as well as routes from Lavrio and Rafina. Authorities also closed schools in the Cyclades and Dodecanese as a safety precaution, while the capital, Athens, faced a high risk of flash flooding and overflowing streams during the peak of the storm's intensity.

Prior to reaching Greece, Erminio battered the Italian and Croatian coasts. In Croatia, the hurricane-force Bora winds led to the closure of major road networks, including sections of the A1 motorway, and restricted traffic on the Maslenica Bridge. In Italy, the storm brought relentless rain and high waves to the southern regions, further straining infrastructure that was already recovering from previous weather systems. Emergency services reported hundreds of interventions for fallen trees and localised flooding along the Adriatic coast.

As the system second pulse tracked eastward towards Cyprus. The island began experiencing secondary effects, including elevated dust levels and intense localised thunderstorms. The storm disrupted some outdoor national holiday celebrations, and maritime authorities warned of rough sea conditions in the eastern Mediterranean as the system's "tail" moved through.

The storm also transported large quantities of Saharan dust across the eastern Mediterranean. In early April 2026, skies over parts of Greece, particularly Crete, turned orange as airborne desert particles reduced visibility and degraded air quality. The phenomenon was widely reported during the passage of Storm Erminio and was accompanied by muddy rainfall in affected areas.

=== Storm Dave (Rapunzel) ===
Storm Dave
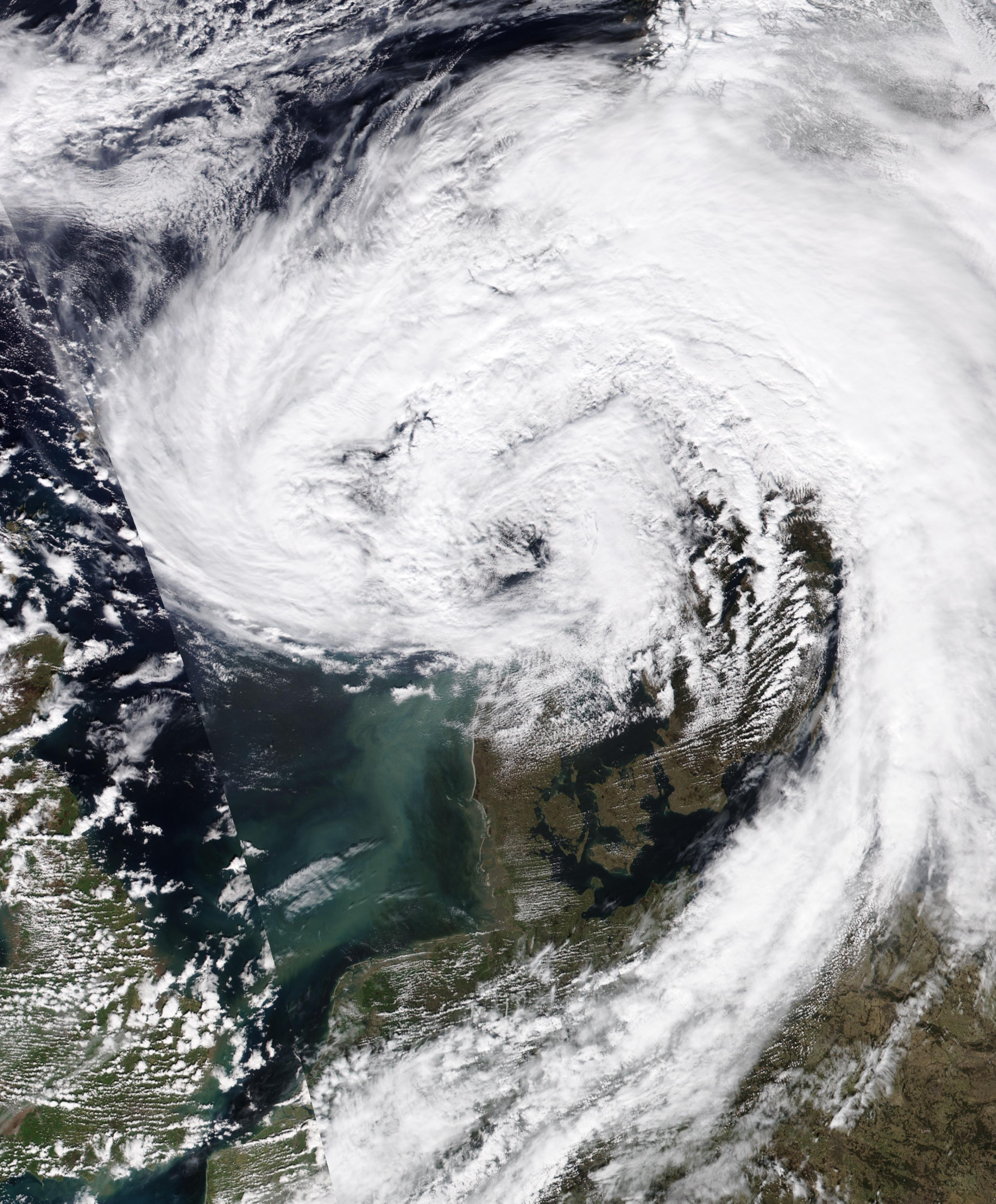

- Area affected: United Kingdom, Ireland, Norway, Sweden, Denmark, Germany
- Date of impact: 2–7 April 2026
- Maximum wind gust: 95.5 mph (42.7 m/s; 83.0 kn; 153.7 km/h) at Eigerøya, Norway
- Lowest pressure: 973 hPa (28.73 inHg)
- Fatalities: Unspecified
- Power outages: Unspecified

==== Date named and background ====
Storm Dave was named on 2 April 2026 by the Met Office. It was also assigned the name Rapunzel by the FUB a day later.

Storm Dave is forecast to form and rapidly deepen through a process of explosive cyclogenesis on Saturday, 4 April 2026, as a powerful jet stream—invigorated by a sharp temperature contrast over North America—propels the low-pressure system across the North Atlantic toward the United Kingdom.

==== Weather warnings issued ====
The Met Office issued multiple Yellow severe weather warnings for wind, encompassing all of Scotland and Northern Ireland, as well as North Wales and northern England. It has been upgraded to Amber in the southern coast of Scotland, Northern England and North Wales. Forecasters noted that these medium-impact warnings were subject to change as the specifics of the storm became clearer. Throughout the affected regions, gusts typically reached 50–60 mph, while more exposed areas saw speeds of 60–70 mph. The most intense conditions occurred in Scotland, where a brief window existed for isolated gusts to peak between 80 and 90 mph. These warnings are likely to get upgraded as the storms impacts become clearer. The Met Office also issued two Amber wind warnings as Storm Dave tracked across the north of the UK. The first warning covers Northwest Wales and Northern England, specifically targeting coastal areas like Anglesey and the Gwynedd coastline, as well as Lancashire and Cumbria. The second alert is focused on Southern and Western Scotland, including Dumfries and Galloway and parts of the Scottish Borders. Both warnings entail "disruptive and potentially damaging winds" with widespread gusts of 60–70 mph and a high likelihood of brief peaks reaching 80 mph. This level of warning signifies a potential danger to life from flying debris, a high risk of power outages, and significant travel disruption due to road closures and dangerous conditions from large waves along windward coasts.

Met Éireann has issued a nationwide Status Yellow wind warning as Storm Dave approaches this weekend. Forecasters predict that initial heavy southerly winds will shift westerly by Saturday evening, bringing severe gusts and gale-force conditions to coastal regions as the system tracks across the country.

The Norwegian Meteorological Institute has elevated its alerts to a Red Warning—the highest level—for parts of Rogaland and Vestland as Storm Dave brings extremely dangerous conditions to the North Sea coast. Forecasters are bracing for hurricane-force gusts exceeding 45 m/s (100 mph), which are expected to cause widespread structural damage, extensive power outages, and the total suspension of ferry and air travel. This extreme wind event is accompanied by amber and yellow warnings for heavy snow and blizzard conditions in the interior, creating a severe risk of avalanches and making road travel nearly impossible across southern and western Norway throughout the Easter weekend.

The Swedish Meteorological and Hydrological Institute (SMHI) has issued several weather warnings across southern and central Sweden as Storm Dave moves over Scandinavia. Orange and yellow wind warnings were in place for regions including Götaland and southern Svealand, where gusts were expected to reach between 21 and 26 m/s on Sunday. These conditions pose a significant risk of fallen trees, power outages, and disruption to transport and infrastructure, with the strongest winds forecast to impact the west coast before moving inland towards Mälardalen.

The Danish Meteorological Institute (DMI) has issued Storm and Gale warnings across several maritime and coastal regions. A Storm warning was in effect for Fisher and Skagerrak, where southwesterly winds are expected to reach between 24 and 29 m/s (approx. 54–65 mph). Additionally, Gale warnings cover the Southern Baltic, Western Baltic, Kattegat, the Belts, and the Sound, with wind speeds typically ranging from 12 to 17 m/s. Significant wave heights are predicted to reach up to 9 metres in the Fisher region, posing a high risk for maritime activities.

The Deutscher Wetterdienst (DWD) has issued warnings for windy to stormy conditions across northern and central Germany as the cold front from Storm Dave tracks from Scotland toward southern Norway. Gale-force gusts of up to 70 km/h (Bft 8) are expected inland today, with significantly stronger winds along the North Sea and Baltic coasts. Over the Brocken in the Harz Mountains, severe storm gusts of up to 100 km/h (Bft 10) are forecast. By Easter Monday, the focus shifts to the Baltic coast and Vorpommern, where heavy storm gusts of up to 90 km/h remain a risk.

==== Storm impacts ====
A top windgust of 42.7 m/s (95 mph/153 km/h) was recorded on Eigerøya, Norway.

In Ireland, impacts from Dave primarily affecting aviation and coastal infrastructure. Dublin Airport has been a focal point of the impact, with at least 15 flight cancellations and numerous "go-arounds" and diversions as pilots dealt with severe crosswinds. In County Kerry, the storm's arrival resulted in power outages for approximately 3,000 homes and businesses, while Kerry Airport also faced landing failures and diversions. Coastal regions, particularly in Galway and Wexford, have experienced wave overtopping and flooding due to the combination of high spring tides and a powerful storm surge, leading to the deployment of flood barriers at the Spanish Arch and the closure of several coastal roads. A road between Gleann Cholm Cille and Mín an Aoire was blocked at Braade due to a landslide. Around 18,000 homes, farms and businesses across Ireland were also without power as a result of Storm Dave.

Across the United Kingdom, the storm has brought destructive winds and heavy snowfall to northern regions. These severe gales have led to widespread travel delays, including the closure of major bridges such as the A55 in Wales and the Forth Road Bridge in Scotland, as well as the cancellation of ferry services across the Irish Sea and to the Hebrides. In Northern Scotland, the storm has been accompanied by up to 30 cm of snow, creating extreme blizzard and whiteout conditions that have rendered many Highland roads impassable. Structural damage, including fallen trees and debris on rail lines, has further hampered travel for millions of people during the Easter bank holiday weekend. Around 2,000 homes were left without power in Northern Ireland on Saturday after Storm Dave brought high winds. Some ferry sailings between Belfast and Scotland on Saturday were also cancelled. In Staffordshire, the storm caused structural damage when a large tree crashed into the roof of two homes, leaving two families homeless. Humber Bridge and the Queensferry Crossing, implemented closures or restrictions, and ScotRail enforced emergency speed limits that lengthened journey times across its network. In Northern Scotland, the combination of heavy snowfall—up to 30 cm in the Highlands—and high winds created blizzard and whiteout conditions that rendered many roads impassable.

In Norway, up to 18,000 homes without power in the Rogaland and Agder regions. Transport was effectively paralysed as major mountain passes closed, ferry services to Denmark were suspended, and Stavanger Airport faced severe operational restrictions. In Sweden, the impacts were equally severe, particularly in the western and southern regions where SMHI issued orange and yellow warnings. Over 31,000 households lost electricity as the storm moved inland, with utility providers like Ellevio struggling to manage the grid instability caused by falling trees. Structural damage was reported across Götaland, including the collapse of a building facade in Uddevalla and significant roof damage to Arena Vänersborg. Public transport was hit hard, with SJ cancelling all train services to and from Gothenburg for the day, and a person in Vetlanda was reportedly injured by a falling tree. By late Sunday evening, the storm began to weaken as it moved toward the Baltic Sea, leaving a trail of infrastructure damage and travel chaos across the peninsula.

=== Storm Ylvi ===
Storm Ylvi
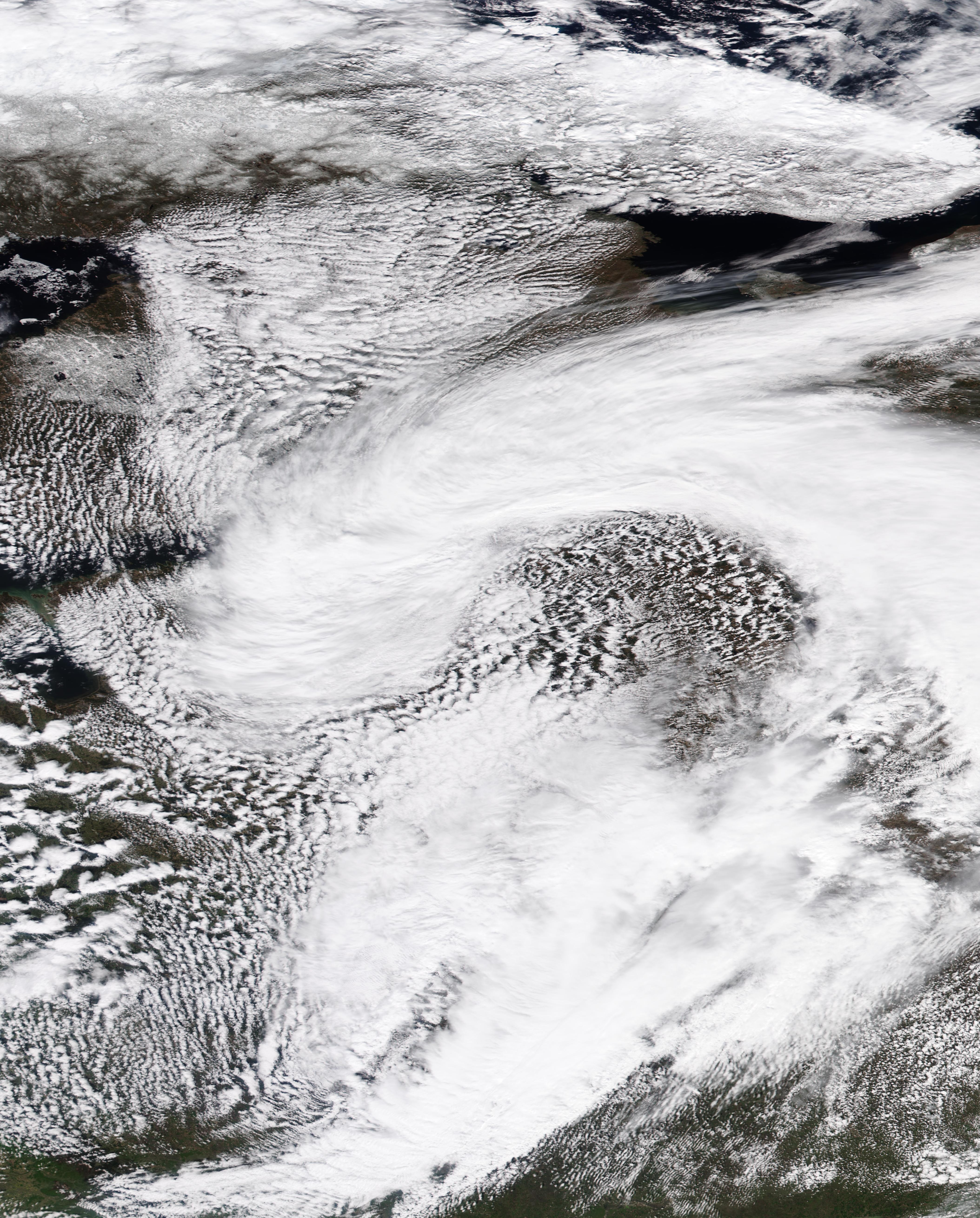

- Area affected: Sweden, Finland, Latvia, Lithuania, Estonia, Poland, Germany, Slovakia, Ukraine, Moldova, Romania
- Date of impact: 23–27 April 2026
- Lowest pressure: 977 hPa (28.85 inHg)
- Fatalities: Unspecified
- Power outages: Unspecified

==== Date named and background ====
Storm Ylvi was named on 23 April 2026 by the Free University of Berlin.

The area of low pressure designated as Ylvi impacted north-eastern and central parts of Europe prompting many orange warnings.

==== Weather warnings issued ====
According to EUMETNET orange wind warnings were in force for northern parts of Germany and Poland as well as coastal and northern areas of Latvia and Estonia. Finland also had orange wind warnings for south-eastern parts of the country accompanied with orange snow warnings. Orange warnings for wind were also issued for northern, central and western parts of Ukraine, all of Moldova and Romania.

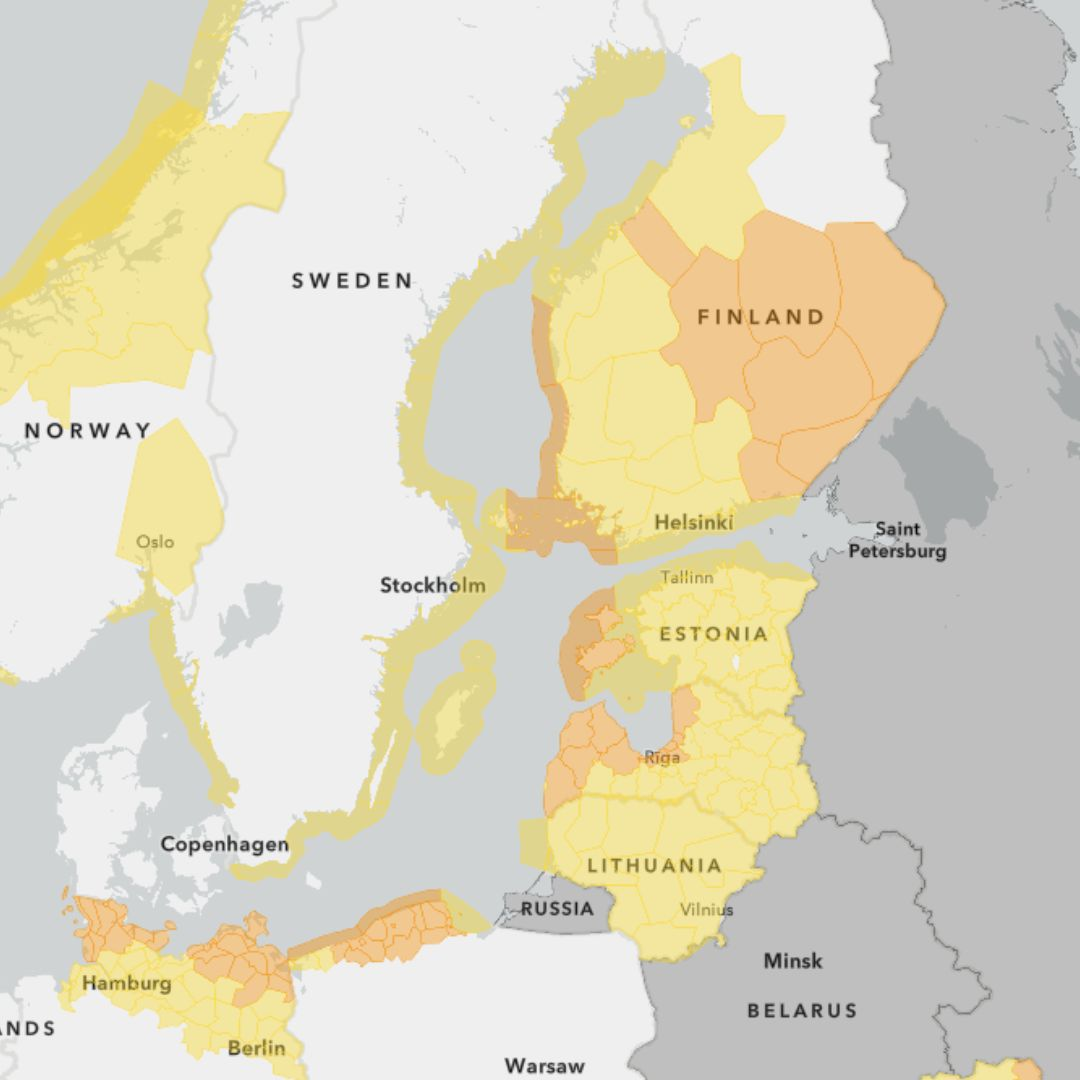
Warnings issued by various countries in the region for the low pressure 'Ylvi' shown on EUMETNET.

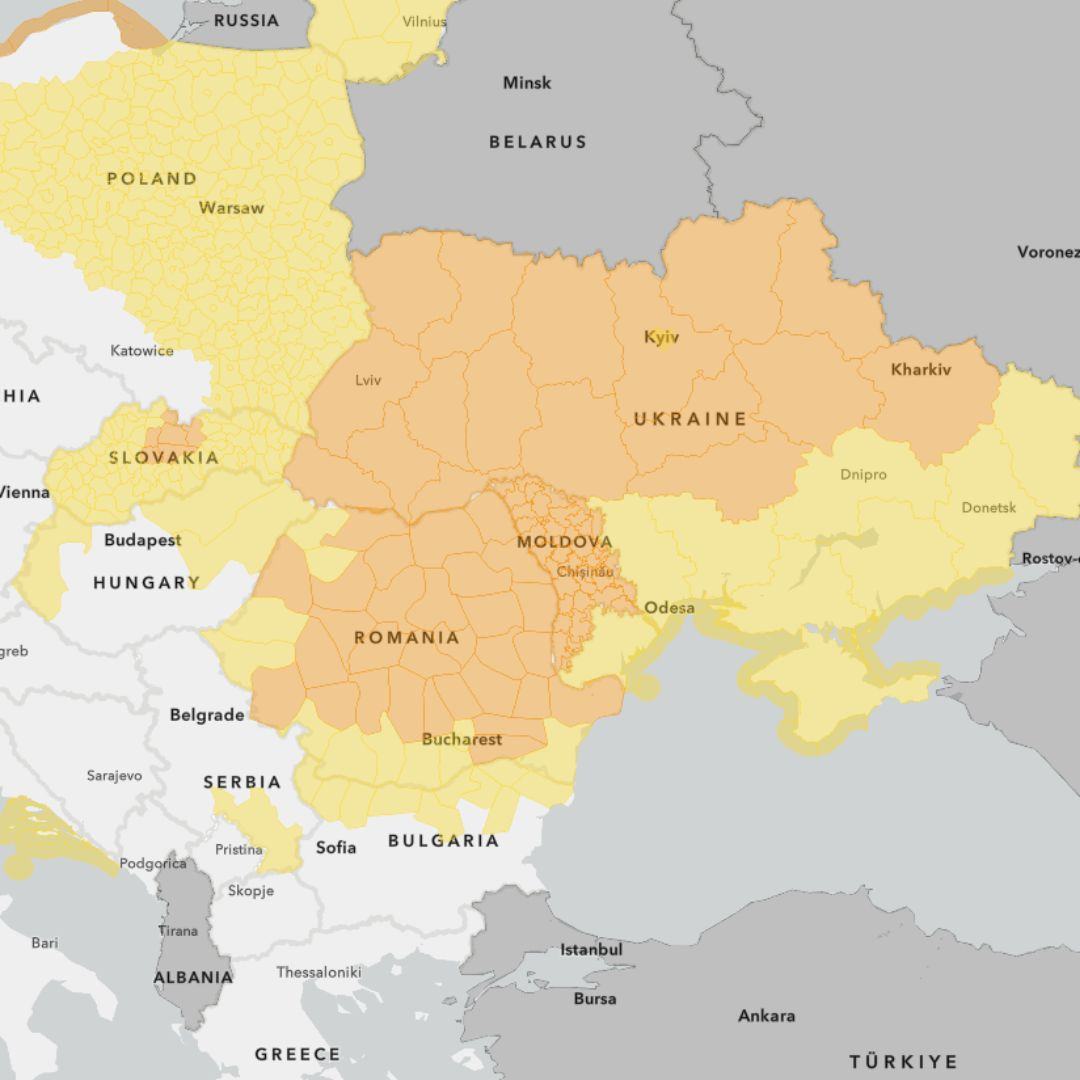
More warnings for Ylvi for countries in Eastern Europe.

=== Storm Bernadette ===
Storm Bernadette
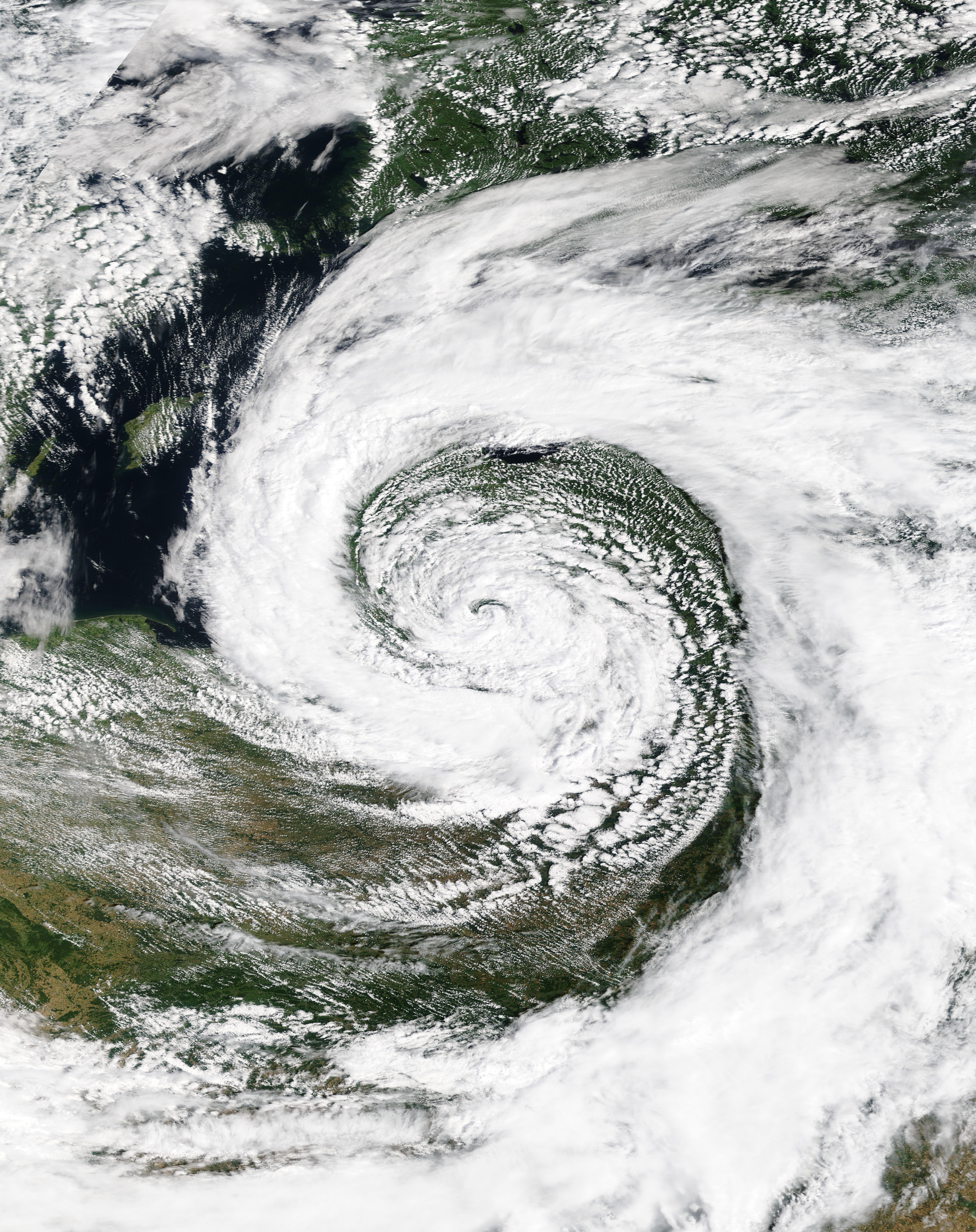

- Area affected: Sweden, Latvia, Lithuania, Estonia, Poland, Germany, Ukraine
- Date of impact: 4-9 July 2026
- Lowest pressure: 983 hPa (29.03 inHg)
- Fatalities: Unspecified
- Power outages: Unspecified

==== Date named and background ====
Storm Bernadette was named on 4 July 2026 by the Free University of Berlin.

The area of low pressure designated as Bernadette impacted the Baltic Sea area of Europe prompting many orange warnings and some red warnings.

==== Weather warnings issued ====
According to Meteo Alarm, the storm prompted two red wind warning for north-eastern Poland with mean speed to 80 km/h (73 ft/s; 50 mph) and gusts up to 120 km/h (110 ft/s; 75 mph). These were surrounded by broad orange wind warnings, with extensive yellow wind warnings for eastern and central Europe, including, Latvia, south-western Lithuania, coastal Estonia and Sweden, and much of Ukraine.

==== Storm impacts ====
The severe storm front that swept across Poland associated with Bernadette brought intense rainfall up to 30 mm, small hail, and powerful wind gusts reaching 80 km/h. Tracking southeast across the country, the system triggered widespread weather alerts and disrupted communities, with meteorologists actively monitoring atmospheric conditions for potential tornado activity.

The most severe economic damage occurred in the Wielkopolska region, where violent hailstorms devastated vital sugar beet fields. This extensive crop defoliation has significantly delayed plant growth and heightened disease risks, triggering an immediate upside risk for regional wholesale sugar prices and prompting Polish officials to signal upcoming emergency financial aid for affected farmers.

=== Storm Priska ===
Storm Priska
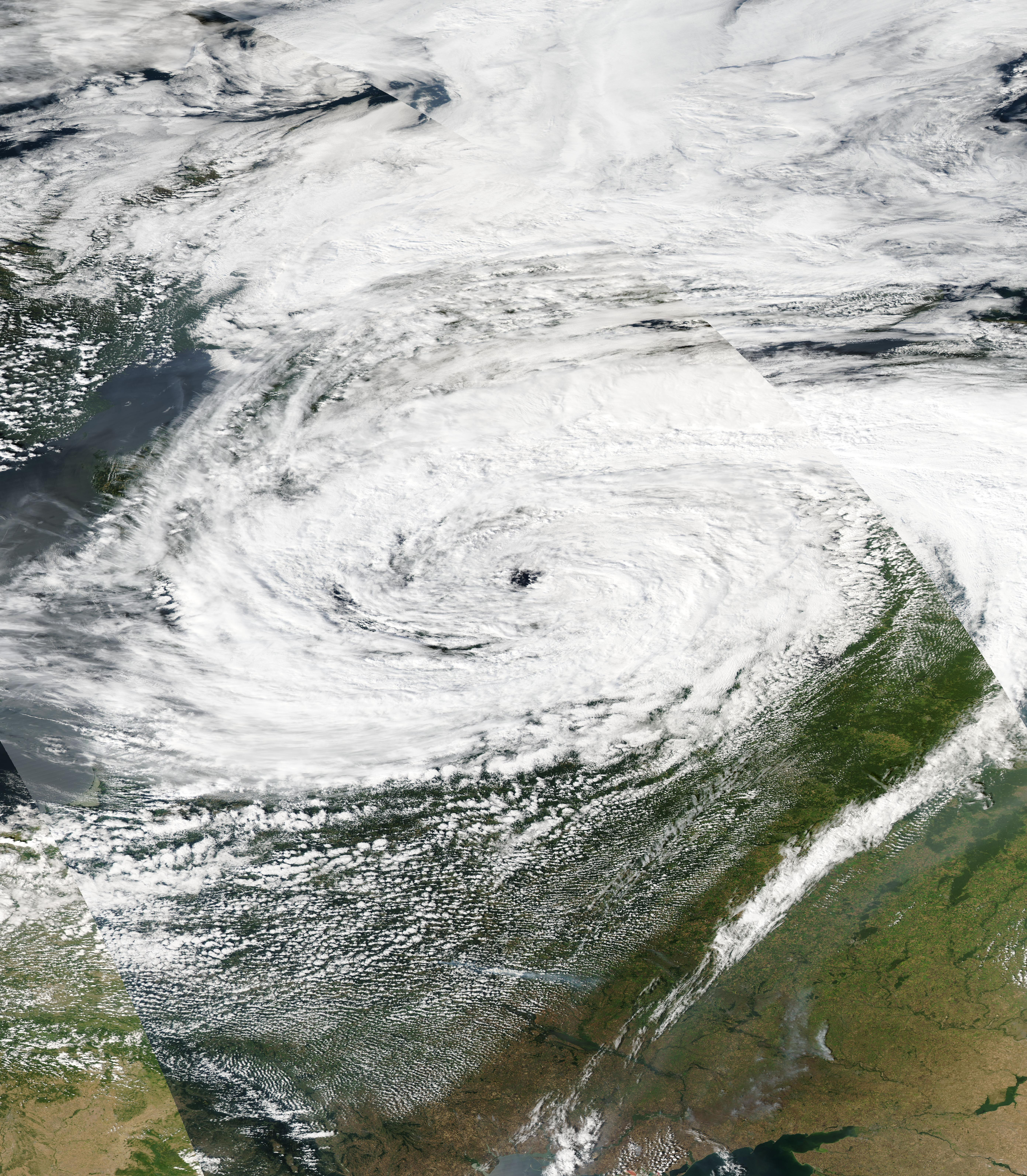

- Area affected: Switzerland, Italy, Latvia, Lithuania, Estonia, Poland, Germany, Ukraine
- Date of impact: 21-24 August 2026
- Maximum wind gust: 74 mph (33 m/s; 64 kn; 119 km/h)
- Lowest pressure: 984 hPa (29.06 inHg)
- Fatalities: 2
- Power outages: 496,000+

==== Date named and background ====
Storm Priska was named on 21 August 2026 by the Free University of Berlin. The area of low pressure designated as Priska impacted Central and Eastern Europe, prompting multiple orange weather warnings across the region.

==== Weather warnings issued ====
According to MeteoAlarm, the weather warnings across Central and Eastern Europe and the Baltic region primarily comprised orange (severe) and yellow (moderate) alerts for severe thunderstorms, heavy rainfall, and strong wind gusts. Orange weather warnings were widely issued across Poland, Slovakia, the Czech Republic, and parts of the Balkans for intense thunderstorm activity accompanied by torrential downpours exceeding 35–50 mm, hail, and damaging wind gusts reaching 90 to 110 km/h. These were flanked by extensive yellow warnings for wind and rain across neighboring regions, including Hungary, Austria, Germany, and into the Baltics—specifically Lithuania, Estonia, and Latvia—where moderate thunderstorm activity, localised flash flooding, and strong coastal wind gusts were forecast.

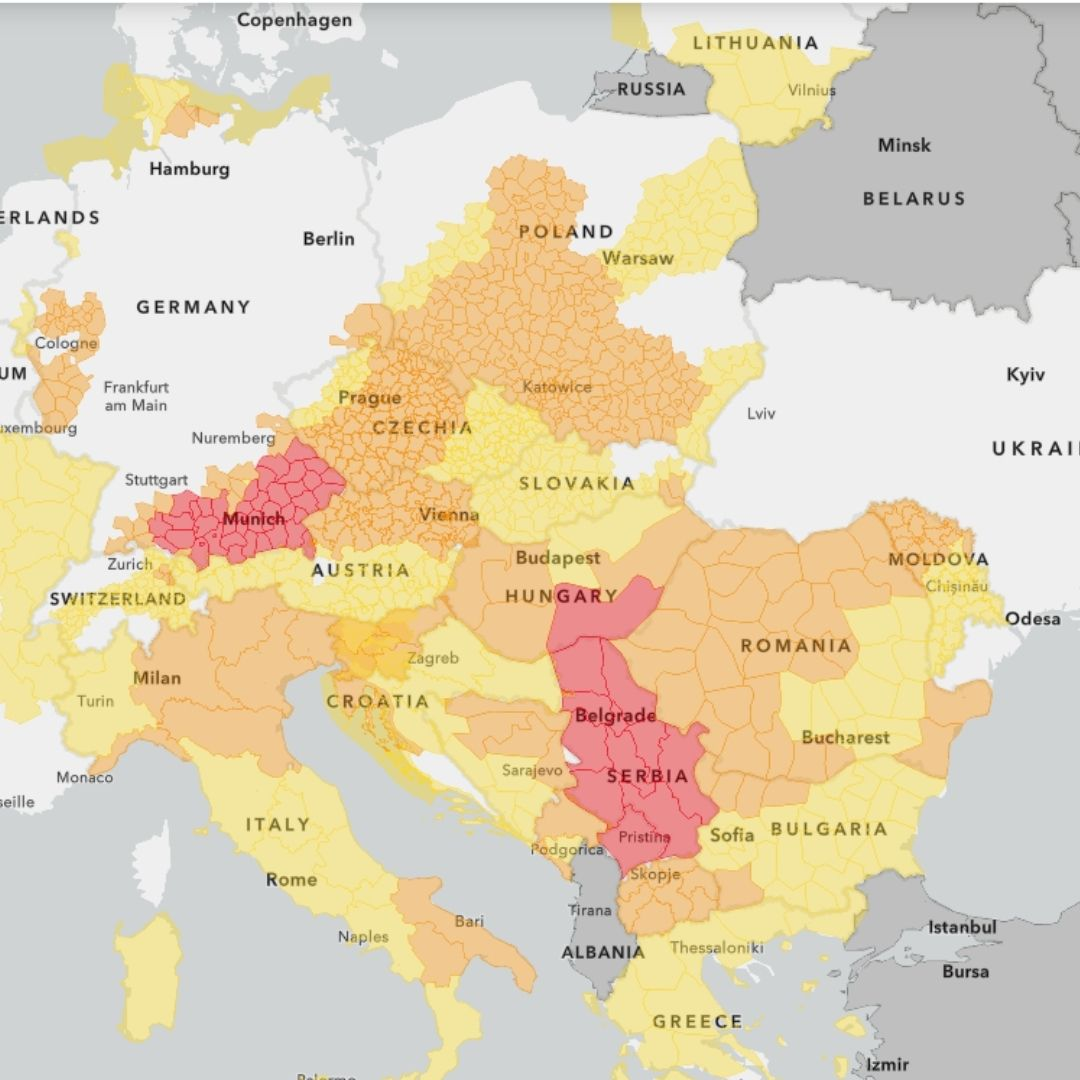
Warnings active on 21 August 2026

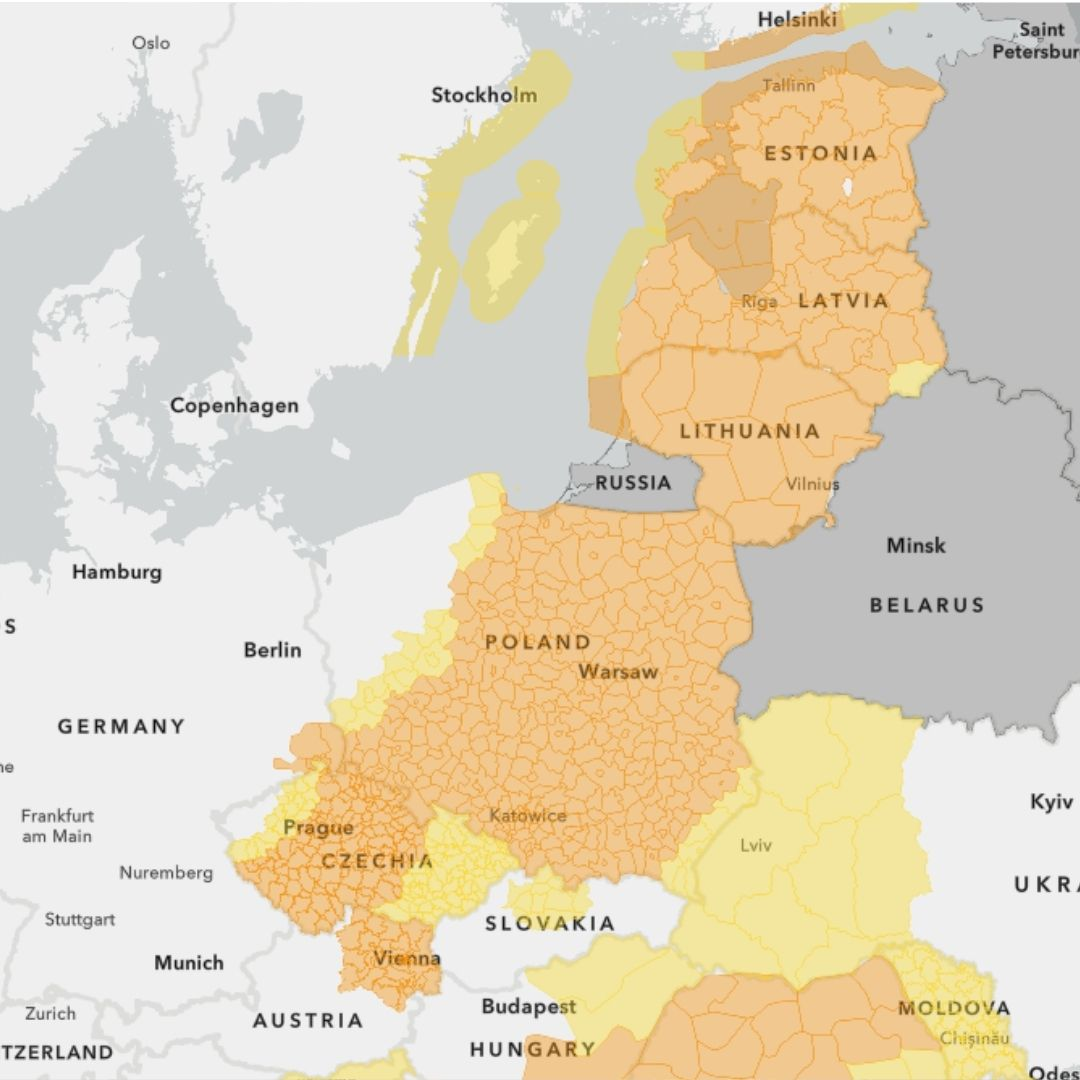
Warnings active on 22 August 2026

==== Storm impacts ====
The passage of the storm's convective squall line produced damaging straight-line wind gusts, frequent cloud-to-ground lightning, severe hail swaths, and short-duration torrential downpours across multiple nations. Early severe convection initiated near the Alpine region, developing mountain-triggered supercells that produced strong wind squalls, heavy hail, and localised intense rain across northern Switzerland and southern Germany. As the system expanded northward and eastward across German states, severe weather warnings were activated for damaging convective wind gusts and localized flash flooding. Tracking eastward, the squall lines generated intense hail corridors and severe gale-force wind gusts across central and northern Polish voivodeships. The storm caused widespread agricultural damage, fallen timber, localised municipal power disruptions, and structural damage to local utility networks. Upon entering Estonia, Latvia, and Lithuania, the storm's trailing cold front produced marine squalls over the Baltic Sea basin, urban flash flooding in coastal municipalities, and localised transport network delays before the system moved away.

Severe damages has been reported in Latvia, with the Latvian Environment, Geology and Meteorology Centre describing it as the strongest summer storm in the region since 1966, where comprehensive observation of wind gust in Latvia began. A gust of 33 m/s (74 mph) has been recorded at Ventė Cape. The storm left at least 277,000 households in Latvia without power and another 219,000 in Lithuania. 1 people has been reported dead in Lithuania due to a fallen tree, and another person was killed by collapsed buildings in Latvia.

== Season effects ==
=== Summary ===
The following table lists all the windstorms that have been named by at least one of the European meteorological naming groups, as well as those with names assigned by the Free University of Berlin (FUB). The table includes the storm's duration, peak intensity, and its socio-economic impact across affected countries.

Name	Dates active	Named by	Highest wind gust	Lowest pressure	Storm Type	FUB name	Countries affected	Fatalities (+missing)
Alessio	20–24 Sep 2025	(Italy) Servizio Meteorologico	Unspecified	1,008 hPa (29.77 inHg)	Genoa Low	Calvin	Italy, Spain, Switzerland, Slovenia, Croatia	2
Gabrielle	25–29 Sep 2025	(United States) NHC	Unspecified	990 hPa (29.23 inHg)	Post-tropical cyclone	N/A	Azores, Iberian Peninsula	Unspecified
Amy	2–6 Oct 2025	(United Kingdom) Met Office	139 mph (62 m/s; 121 kn; 224 km/h)	942 hPa (27.82 inHg)	Extra-tropical cyclone	Detlef	United Kingdom, Ireland, Norway, Denmark, Sweden	4
Barbara	5–10 Oct 2025	(Italy) Servizio Meteorologico	Unspecified	1,003 hPa (29.62 inHg)	Genoa Low	N/A	Italy, the Balkans, Romania, Moldova, Ukraine	Unspecified
Alice	7–10 Oct 2025	(Spain) AEMET	Unspecified	1,015 hPa (29.97 inHg)	DANA	N/A	Eastern Spain and Balearic Islands	Unspecified
Benjamin	22–26 Oct 2025	Météo-France	104 mph (46 m/s; 90 kn; 167 km/h)	969 hPa (28.61 inHg)	Extra-tropical cyclone	N/A	United Kingdom, France, Spain, Netherlands, Belgium, Germany, Norway	1
Lothar	26–31 Oct 2025	(Germany) FUB	Unspecified	988 hPa (29.18 inHg)	Extra-tropical cyclone	FUB assigned	United Kingdom, France, Spain, Netherlands, Belgium, Germany, Norway, Sweden, Poland, Lithuania, Latvia, Estonia	Unspecified
Claudia	10–17 Nov 2025	Météo-France	Unspecified	970 hPa (28.64 inHg)	Extra-tropical cyclone	Pepe	United Kingdom, Ireland, Spain, Portugal	3
Wolfgang	24–27 Nov 2025	(Germany) FUB	Unspecified	997 hPa (29.44 inHg)	Extra-tropical cyclone	FUB assigned	Italy, the Balkans, Poland, Latvia	Unspecified
Adel	25–30 Nov 2025	(Greece) HNMS	Unspecified	1,004 hPa (29.65 inHg)	Genoa Low	N/A	Italy, Greece, Albania, Turkey	Unspecified
Cassio	3–5 Dec 2025	(Italy) Servizio Meteorologico	Unspecified	999 hPa (29.50 inHg)	Extra-tropical cyclone	Dieter I	Italy, Bosnia and Herzegovina, Croatia, Austria	Unspecified
Byron	4–9 Dec 2025	(Greece) HNMS	Unspecified	1,000 hPa (29.53 inHg)	Extra-tropical cyclone	Dieter II	Greece, Cyprus, Israel	18+
Davide	5–7 Dec 2025	Météo-France	Unspecified	965 hPa (28.50 inHg)	Extra-tropical cyclone	Elias	United Kingdom, France, Ireland	Unspecified
Bram	8–11 Dec 2025	(United Kingdom) Met Office	96 mph (43 m/s; 83 kn; 154 km/h)	959 hPa (28.32 inHg)	Shappiro-Keyser Extra-tropical cyclone	Helmut	United Kingdom, Ireland	Unspecified
Emilia	11–15 Dec 2025	(Spain) AEMET	98 mph (44 m/s; 85 kn; 158 km/h)	1,007 hPa (29.74 inHg)	Extra-tropical depression	Jonathan	Spain, Canary Islands, Portugal, Morocco	37+
Nils	20–26 Dec 2025	(Germany) FUB	Unspecified	989 hPa (29.21 inHg)	Extra-tropical cyclone	FUB assigned	France, Spain, Italy, Croatia, Slovenia	Unspecified
Johannes	26–29 Dec 2025	(Sweden) SMHI	97 mph (43 m/s; 84 kn; 156 km/h)	982 hPa (29.00 inHg)	Polar Low	FUB assigned	Norway, Sweden, Finland, Estonia, Latvia, Lithuania	3
Roman	27–31 Dec 2025	(Germany) FUB	Unspecified	987 hPa (29.15 inHg)	Polar Low	FUB assigned	Norway, Sweden, Finland, Estonia, Latvia, Lithuania, Poland	1
Anna	30 Dec 2025 – 5 Jan 2026	(Sweden) SMHI	Unspecified	971 hPa (28.67 inHg)	Polar Low	Tizian	Norway, Sweden, Finland, Denmark, Germany, Benelux, the Baltics, United Kingdom	Unspecified
Francis	31 Dec 2025 – 9 Jan 2026	(Portugal) IPMA	75 mph (34 m/s; 65 kn; 121 km/h)	980 hPa (28.94 inHg)	Baroclinic extra-tropical cyclone	Ulli	the Azores, Spain, Portugal, Morocco, Canary Islands, Algeria, Tunisia, Italy, Greece, Croatia, the Balkans, Moldova, Romania, Ukraine	8
Goretti	6–10 Jan 2026	Météo-France	132 mph (59 m/s; 115 kn; 212 km/h)	969 hPa (28.61 inHg)	Extra-tropical cyclone	Elli	United Kingdom, France, Belgium, Netherlands, Germany, Spain (indirectly)	2 (1 indirect)
Harry	16–23 Jan 2026	(Spain) AEMET	81 mph (36 m/s; 70 kn; 130 km/h)	995 hPa (29.38 inHg)	Extra-tropical cyclone	N/A	Spain, Portugal, France, Algeria, Tunisia, Italy, Malta	386+
Ingrid	20–25 Jan 2026	(Portugal) IPMA	Unspecified	954 hPa (28.17 inHg)	Extra-tropical cyclone	Leonie	United Kingdom, Spain, Portugal, France, Ireland	Unspecified
Joseph	25–28 Jan 2026	(Portugal) IPMA	Unspecified	939 hPa (27.73 inHg)	Extra-tropical cyclone	Marilu	Azores, Portugal	1
Chandra	26–28 Jan 2026	(United Kingdom) Met Office	73 mph (33 m/s; 63 kn; 117 km/h)	958 hPa (28.29 inHg)	Extra-tropical cyclone	Norma	United Kingdom, Ireland	1
Kristin	27–31 Jan 2026	(Portugal) IPMA	129.74 mph (58.00 m/s; 112.74 kn; 208.80 km/h)	975 hPa (28.79 inHg)	Extra-tropical cyclone	N/A	Portugal, Spain, Gibraltar, Morocco, Italy, Greece, the Balkans, Ukraine, United Kingdom	15
Patricia	30 Jan–3 Feb 2026	(Germany) FUB	Unspecified	992 hPa (29.29 inHg)	Extra-tropical cyclone	FUB assigned	Italy, Croatia, Greece, Bulgaria, Romania, the Balkans	Unspecified
Leonardo	2–7 Feb 2026	(Portugal) IPMA	Unspecified	964 hPa (28.47 inHg)	Extra-tropical cyclone	Stephie	Spain, Azores, Portugal, Morocco, United Kingdom	Unspecified
Marta	5–8 Feb 2026	(Portugal) IPMA	Unspecified	993 hPa (29.32 inHg)	Extra-tropical cyclone	N/A	Spain, Portugal	2
Nils	10–13 Feb 2026	Météo-France	Unspecified	Unspecified	Extra-tropical cyclone	Ulrike	Spain, Portugal, France, Belgium, Netherlands, Germany	Unspecified
Oriana	12–16 Feb 2026	(Spain) AEMET	Unspecified	Unspecified	Extra-tropical cyclone	Viviana	Spain, Portugal, France, Algeria, Morocco, Italy, Tunisia, the Balkans, Romania, Moldova, Ukraine	1
Pedro	17–20 Feb 2026	Météo-France	Unspecified	983 hPa (29.03 inHg)	Extra-tropical cyclone	Yael	United Kingdom, France, Spain, Portugal, Germany, Italy	(1)
Regina	1–7 Mar 2026	(Portugal) IPMA	75 mph (34 m/s; 65 kn; 121 km/h)	1,000 hPa (29.53 inHg)	Cut off low	N/A	Spain, Canary Islands, Portugal, Medeira Archipelago, Morocco	Unspecified
Samuel	15–19 Mar 2026	Meteo Andorra	100 mph (45 m/s; 87 kn; 160 km/h)	1,003 hPa (29.62 inHg)	Extra-tropical cyclone / Mediterranean tropical-like cyclone	Jolina	Spain, Portugal, Malta, Italy, Greece, Libya, Egypt, Andorra	1
Therese	16–24 Mar 2026	(Portugal) IPMA	Unspecified	984 hPa (29.06 inHg)	Extra-tropical cyclone	N/A	Spain (including Canary Islands), Portugal	Unspecified
Deborah	25–30 Mar 2026	(Italy) Servizio Meteorologico	Unspecified	987 hPa (29.15 inHg)	Extra-tropical cyclone	N/A	Italy, Croatia, the Balkans, Greece	2
Erminio	31 Mar–4 Apr 2026	(Italy) Servizio Meteorologico	Unspecified	989 hPa (29.21 inHg)	Extra-tropical cyclone	N/A	Italy, Greece, Croatia, Tunisia, Cyprus, Montenegro, Albania, Israel, Lebanon, Turkey	2
Dave	2–7 Apr 2026	(United Kingdom) Met Office	95.5 mph (42.7 m/s; 83.0 kn; 153.7 km/h)	973 hPa (28.73 inHg)	Extra-tropical cyclone	Rapunzel	United Kingdom, Ireland, Norway, Sweden, Denmark, Germany	Unspecified
Ylvi	23–27 Apr 2026	(Germany) FUB	Unspecified	977 hPa (28.85 inHg)	Extra-tropical cyclone	FUB assigned	Sweden, Finland, Latvia, Lithuania, Estonia, Poland, Germany, Slovakia, Ukraine, Moldova, Romania	Unspecified
Bernadette	4–9 Jul 2026	(Germany) FUB	Unspecified	983 hPa (29.03 inHg)	Extra-tropical cyclone	FUB assigned	Sweden, Latvia, Lithuania, Estonia, Poland, Germany, Ukraine	Unspecified
Priska	21-24 Aug 2026	(Germany) FUB	74 mph (33 m/s; 64 kn; 119 km/h)	984 hPa (29.06 inHg)	Extra-tropical cyclone	FUB assigned	Switzerland, Italy, Latvia, Lithuania, Estonia, Poland, Germany, Ukraine	2

=== Wildlife impacts ===
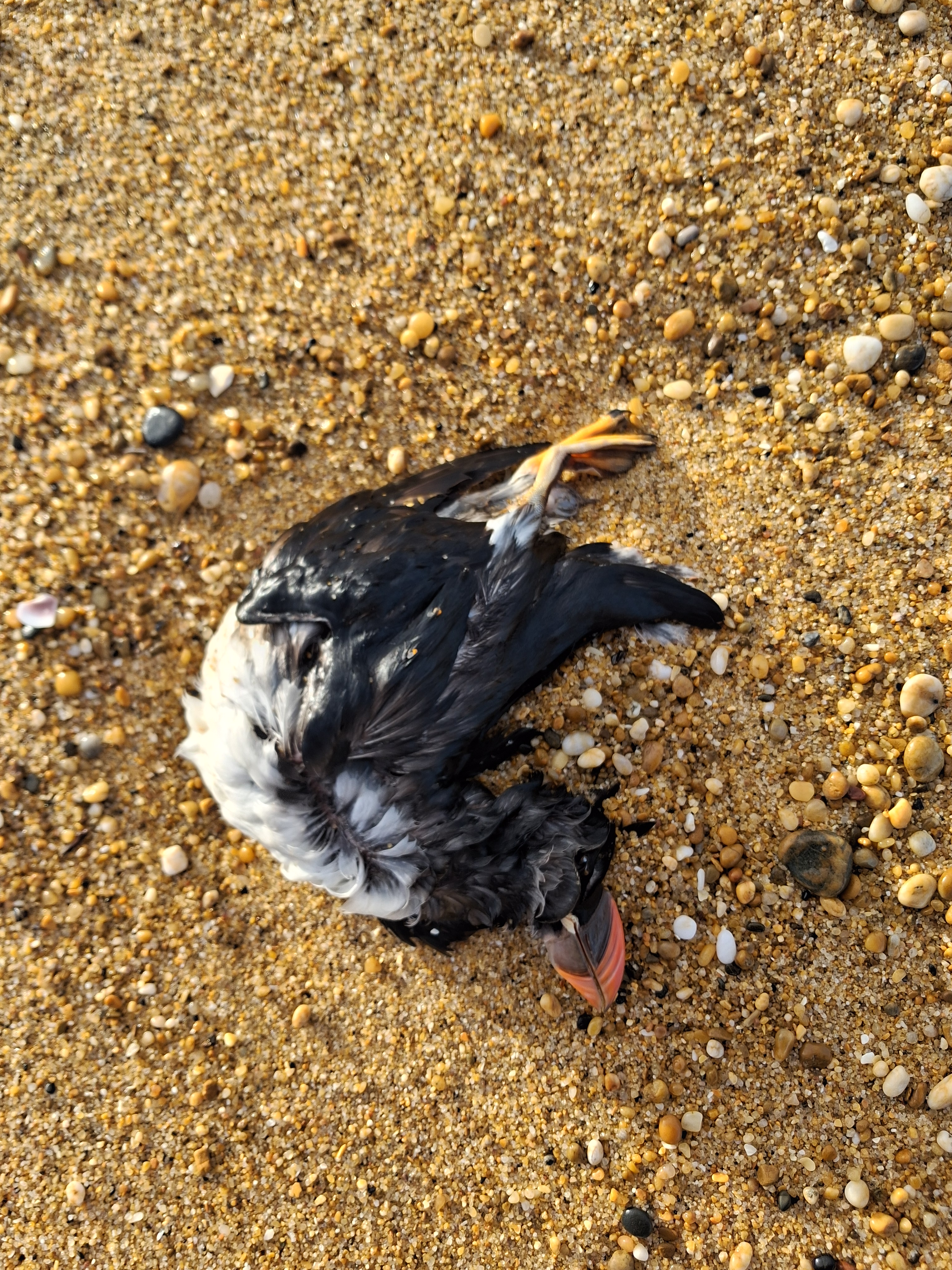
Dead Atlantic puffin (Fratercula arctica) following mass beaching in Southern France due to sustained winter storms.

In February 2026, nearly 25,000 seabirds, primarily Atlantic Puffins (Fratercula arctica), were found stranded along the British, French (20,000), Spanish (4,400) and Portuguese (1,200) Atlantic coasts due to severe weather conditions. Successive winter storms prevent sea birds from feeding, leading to mass starvation and exhaustion, a known phenomenon with marginal overall effect on the affected species if occasional.

Wildlife centers in regions like Brittany and Nouvelle-Aquitaine are struggling to treat hundreds of weakened survivors. Local associations have deployed emergency volunteers to patrol beaches in order to collect and rescue injured birds. The public is called to not directly touch the animals to prevent additional stress, use gloves to avoid contaminations and to report sightings to bird monitorings groups such as eBird and Ligue pour la protection des oiseaux (LPO).

== See also ==
- Weather of: 2025, 2026
- Tropical cyclones in: 2025, 2026
- Winter of 2025–26 in Great Britain and Ireland
- 2025–26 North American winter
- List of historical European windstorm names
