= Winter of 2025–26 in Great Britain and Ireland =

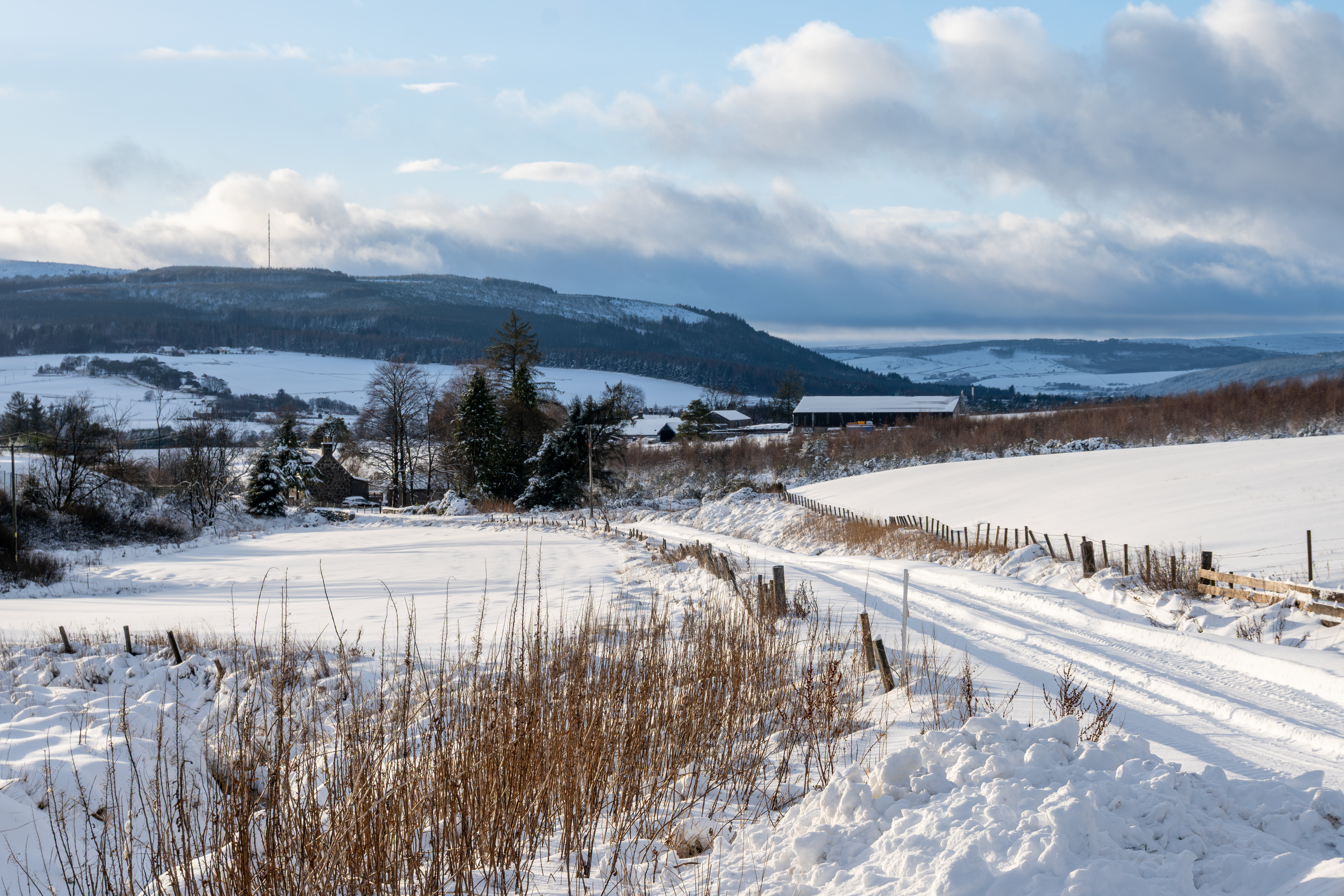
- Snowfall in Scotland in January
- First event started: 18 November 2025
- Last event concluded: 28 January 2026

Seasonal statistics
- Maximum snowfall accumulation: 52 cm (20 in) at Tomintoul, Scotland on 4 January
- Total fatalities: 5
- Total damage: Unknown

Related articles
- 2025–26 Asian winter; 2025–26 European windstorm season; 2025–26 North American winter

Significant events in the 2025–26 winter in Great Britain and Ireland included a cold wave in November that brought heavy snowfall, another cold wave at the start of 2026 during which four people died at sea, and a windstorm in January that caused widespread damage and killed one person.

== Events ==
=== November cold snap ===
November 2025 cold wave
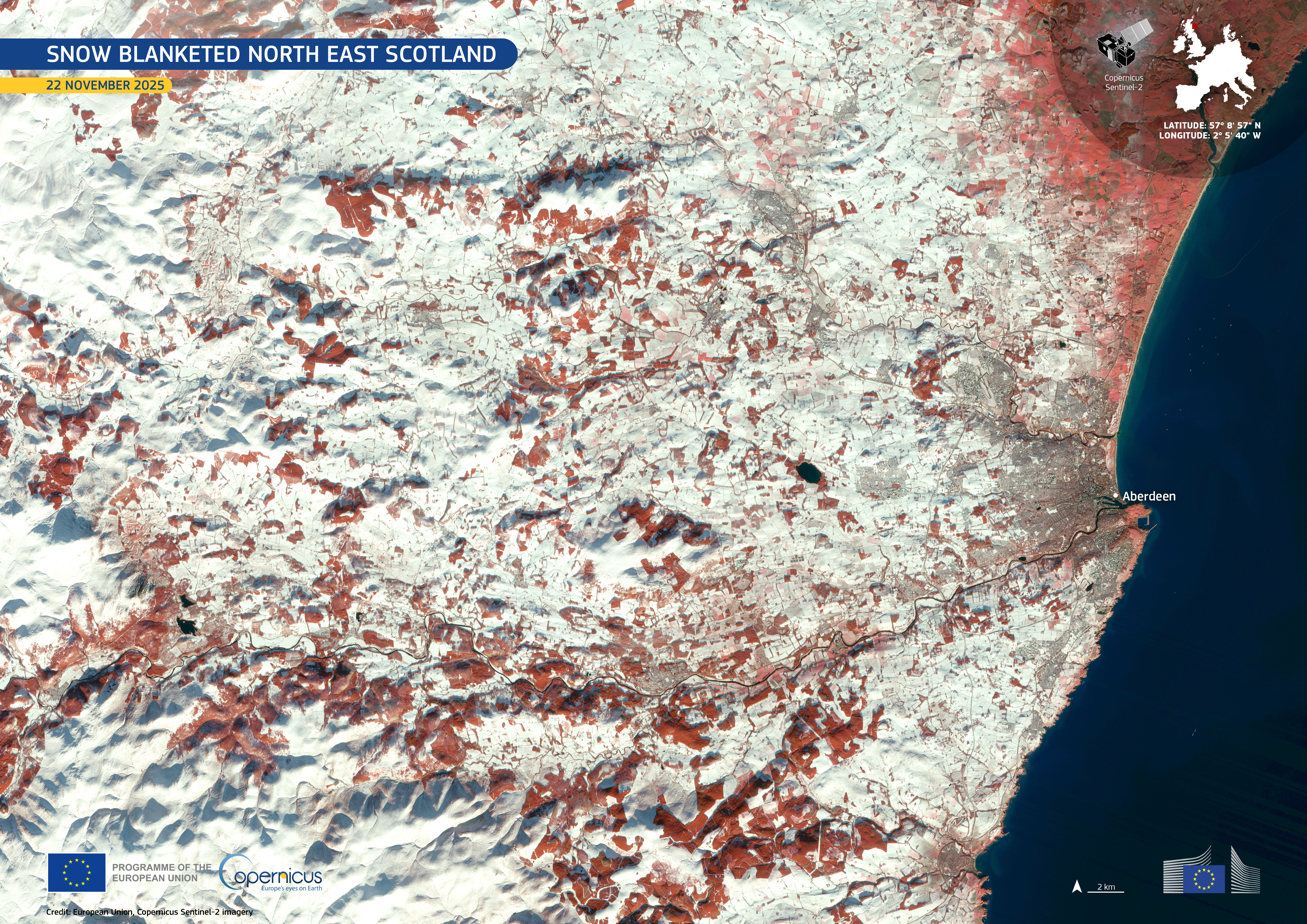
- Snow covering north east Scotland on 18 November

Meteorological history
- Formed: 17 November 2025
- Dissipated: 21 November 2025

Cold wave
- Lowest temp: −12.6 °C (9.3 °F) at Tomintoul, Scotland on 21 November
- Max. snowfall: 28 cm (11 in) at Crymych, Wales on 20 November

Overall effects
- Injuries: 3+

Between 17 and 21 November 2025, the British Isles were struck by a cold wave which caused widespread disruption to infrastructure. According to the Met Office, the lowest temperature of the wave at −12.6 °C (9.3 °F) was recorded during the early hours of 21 November at Tomintoul in Moray, Scotland, which was the lowest temperature recorded on a November night in 15 years. At 11 a.m. on 20 November, a snow depth of 9 cm (3.5 in) was recorded by the Met Office at two locations in the Scottish Highlands; a greater depth of 28 cm (11 in) was unofficially recorded in Crymych, a village in Pembrokeshire, Wales.

A persistent period of heavy rain from Storm Claudia, which brought severe flooding to some areas of the United Kingdom, was displaced by a high-pressure area moving in from the north that brought with it cold air. This area of cold air affected Scotland for a couple of days, leading to the country's first snowfall of the season in Inverness on 14 November as temperatures dropped to −5.8 °C (21.6 °F) in Kinbrace. It then plunged southwards on 17 November, prompting the Met Office and UKHSA to issue a number of warnings relating to the forecasted freezing temperatures. Maximum temperatures were expected to drop by 8 °C (14 °F) between 13 and 17 November.

On 17 November, the UK Health Security Agency (UKHSA) issued an amber Cold-Health Alert (CHA) for the North East, North West and Yorkshire and the Humber regions, with a yellow CHA in place for the rest of England until 8 a.m. on 22 November. On 18 November, Met Éireann issued Status Yellow warnings for snow and ice from midnight that day to midday on 20 November for the counties of Cavan, Donegal, Monaghan, Leitrim and Sligo. Another Status Yellow warning for low temperatures was in force between 11 p.m. on 20 November until 8 a.m. on 21 November for the counties of Carlow, Kildare, Kilkenny, Laois, Longford, Meath, Offaly, Tipperary, Westmeath and Wicklow. The Met Office issued an amber weather warning for snow on 18 November, covering parts of Yorkshire between 5 a.m. and 9 p.m. on 20 November. Parts of South West England and southwestern Wales were covered by a yellow snow and ice warning from midday on 19 November to midnight the next day.

On 19 November, a gritter overturned on the A382 road on Dartmoor whilst preparing roads for the forecasted snow and ice; the driver sustained minor injuries. Over 40 schools were closed in northern Scotland and many roads were closed, including part of the A9 after a lorry jack-knifed. By 20 November over 100 schools had closed in north east Scotland due to heavy snowfall, with many more closing in other areas of the country as a snow depth of 23 cm (9.1 in) was recorded in Strathdon. Four flights were cancelled at Aberdeen Airport whilst two people were taken to hospital after a car hit a pedestrian in Aberdeen; travel on numerous roads including the A90 was disrupted due to traffic collisions and the closure of snow gates.

=== Seaford tornado ===
2025 Seaford tornado
Meteorological history
- Formed: 6 December 2025

T3 tornado
- on the TORRO scale
- Max width: 45 m (148 ft)
- Path length: 1.3 km (0.81 mi)

On 6 December, a tornado struck Seaford in East Sussex on the south coast of England, causing damage to several properties in the town. The tornado, which is believed to have started as a waterspout, made landfall in the early hours of the morning and was rated as a T3 on the TORRO scale, indicating windspeeds from 93–114 mph (150–183 km/h). Around 40 properties were found to have sustained damage along a track which was 1.3 km (0.81 mi) long with a maximum width of 45 m (148 ft). At a property close to the beach, a shed was destroyed, a roof's felt covering was peeled away and firewood was lifted and carried before being thrown through both a car and house window. One property had its greenhouse completely destroyed, whilst two sets of attached garages had their roofs torn off and thrown into nearby houses, causing significant damage.

=== Storm Bram ===
Storm Bram
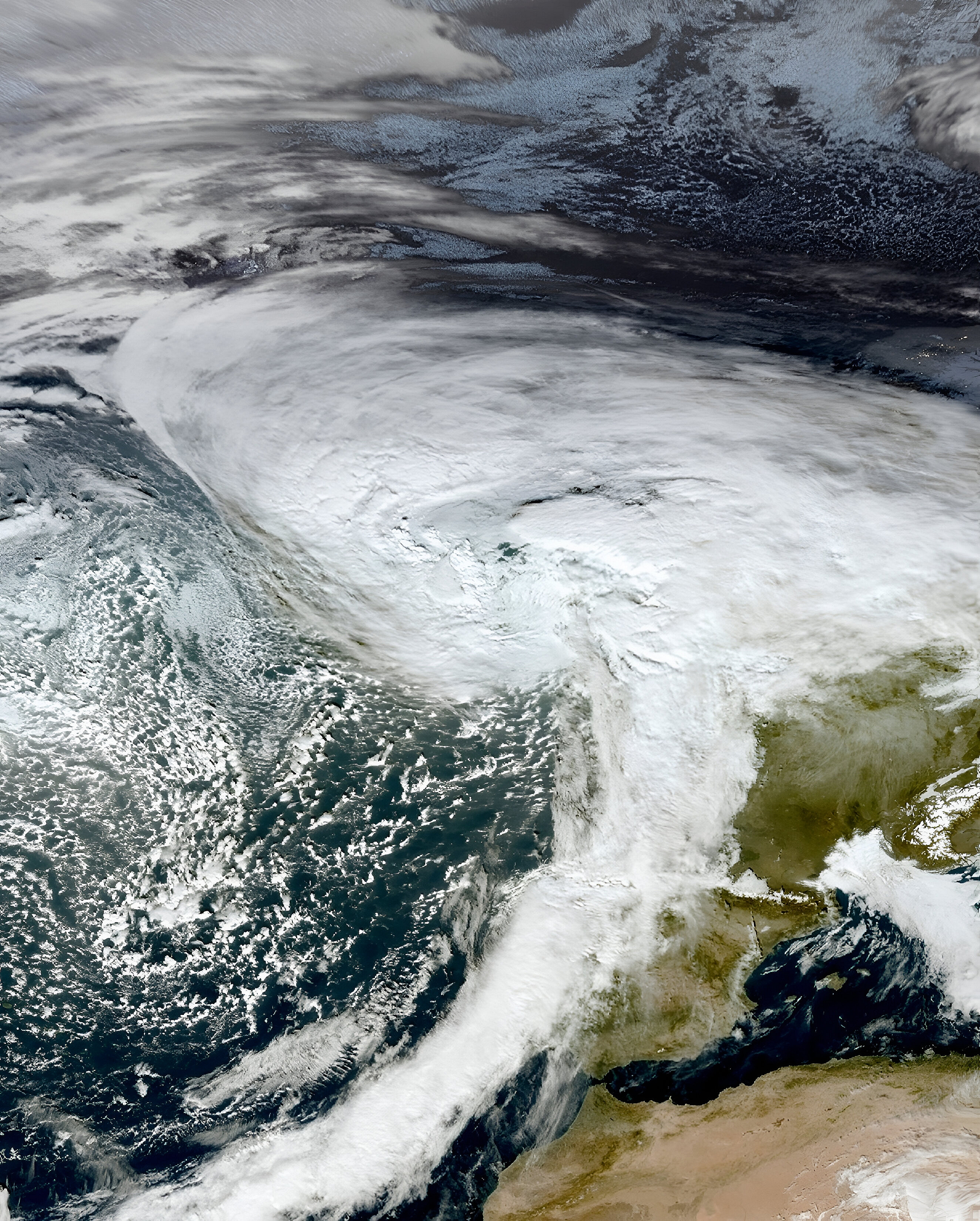
- Bram on 9 December

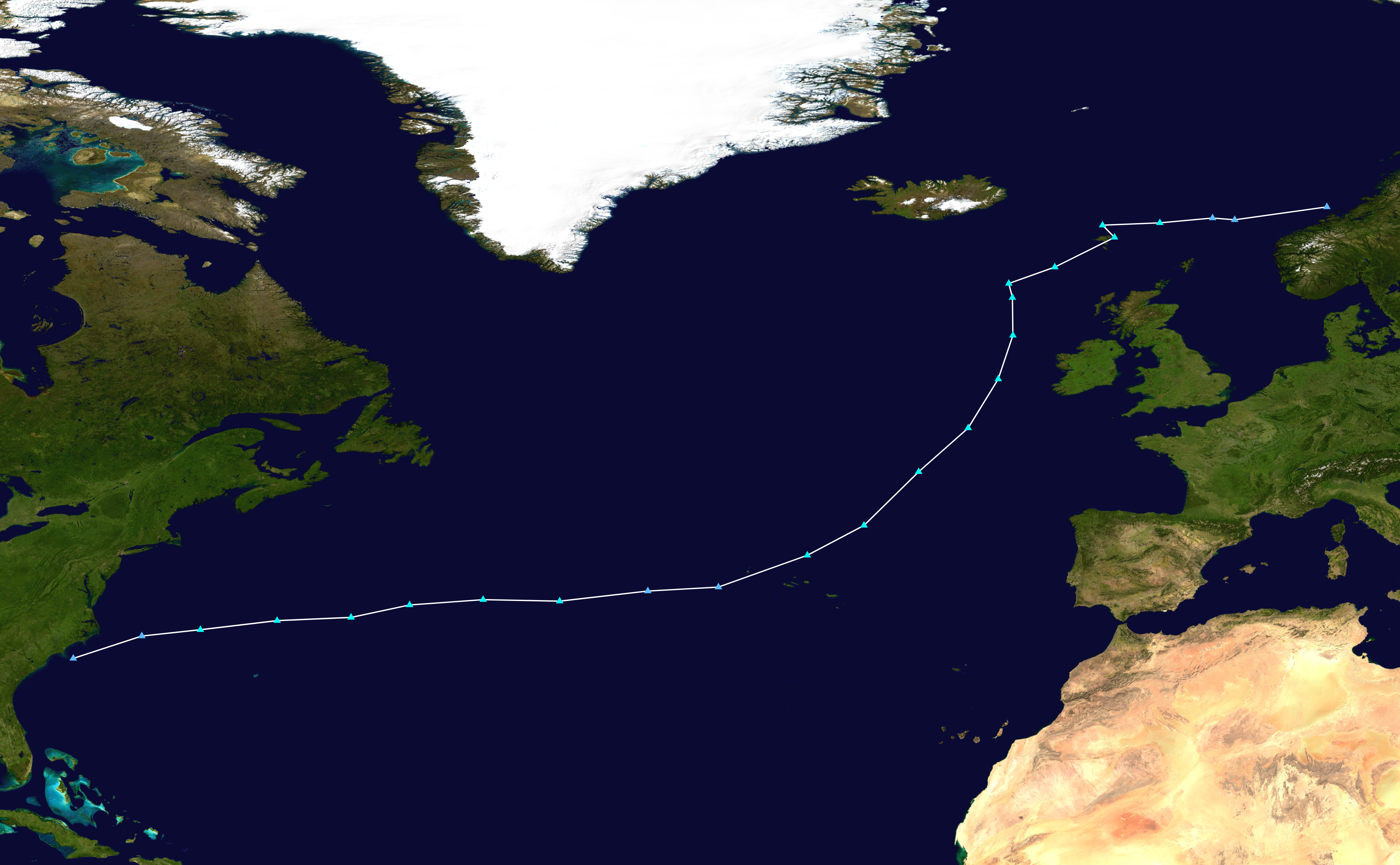
- Path of Storm Bram
- Date of impact: 8–11 December 2025
- Maximum wind gust: 119 mph (53 m/s; 103 kn; 192 km/h) at Cairn Gorm, Scotland
- Lowest pressure: 959 hPa (28.32 inHg)
- Power outages: >30,000

Storm Bram was named by Met Éireann on 8 December 2025 and brought strong winds and heavy rain to large areas of the country. A yellow wind warning was in place across south west England and west Wales from 10 p.m. on 8 December to 4 p.m. the next day, with further yellow warnings covering Northern Ireland from 9 a.m. to 10 p.m. and much of Scotland and northern England from midday to midnight on 9 December. A further amber wind warning was issued for western Northern Ireland, in place from 2 to 7 p.m. on 9 December, whilst an amber warning covered north-west Scotland from 4 p.m. to 3 a.m. the following day. A red weather warning was also issued for the Isle of Man, where all flights and ferries were cancelled.

On 9 December, ESB Networks said around 25,000 properties in Ireland were without power, whilst a "few thousand" more were cut off in Northern Ireland. Part of a sea wall in Carrickfergus was washed away, causing heavy flooding nearby whilst crashing waves left debris on the A2 and A20 roads on the Ards Peninsula. Over 100 flights were cancelled across the island: more than 10 between Belfast City Airport and Great Britain, all Loganair flights at City of Derry Airport and a total of 91 at Dublin Airport. Several ferry services were also cancelled between Belfast and Cairnryan, Dublin to Holyhead, Larne and Cairnryan, and Rathlin Island and Ballycastle. Numerous bus services were also cancelled, as well as train services between Carrickfergus and Larne Harbour.

In Scotland, a number of power cuts were reported in several areas of the country, whilst multiple overturned vehicles forced the closure of the A74(M) on 9 December. Train services saw heavy disruption, particularly in the west and south west: a fallen tree damaged overhead lines on the Neilston Line, a train struck a trampoline south of Perth, part of the West Highland Line closed, the line between Ayr and Stranraer closed, and speed restrictions were introduced on the Borders Railway and the East Coast Main Line. Two flights from London City Airport to Edinburgh Airport were cancelled, as well as several ferries including the Corran Ferry and sailings at Cairnryan Harbour.

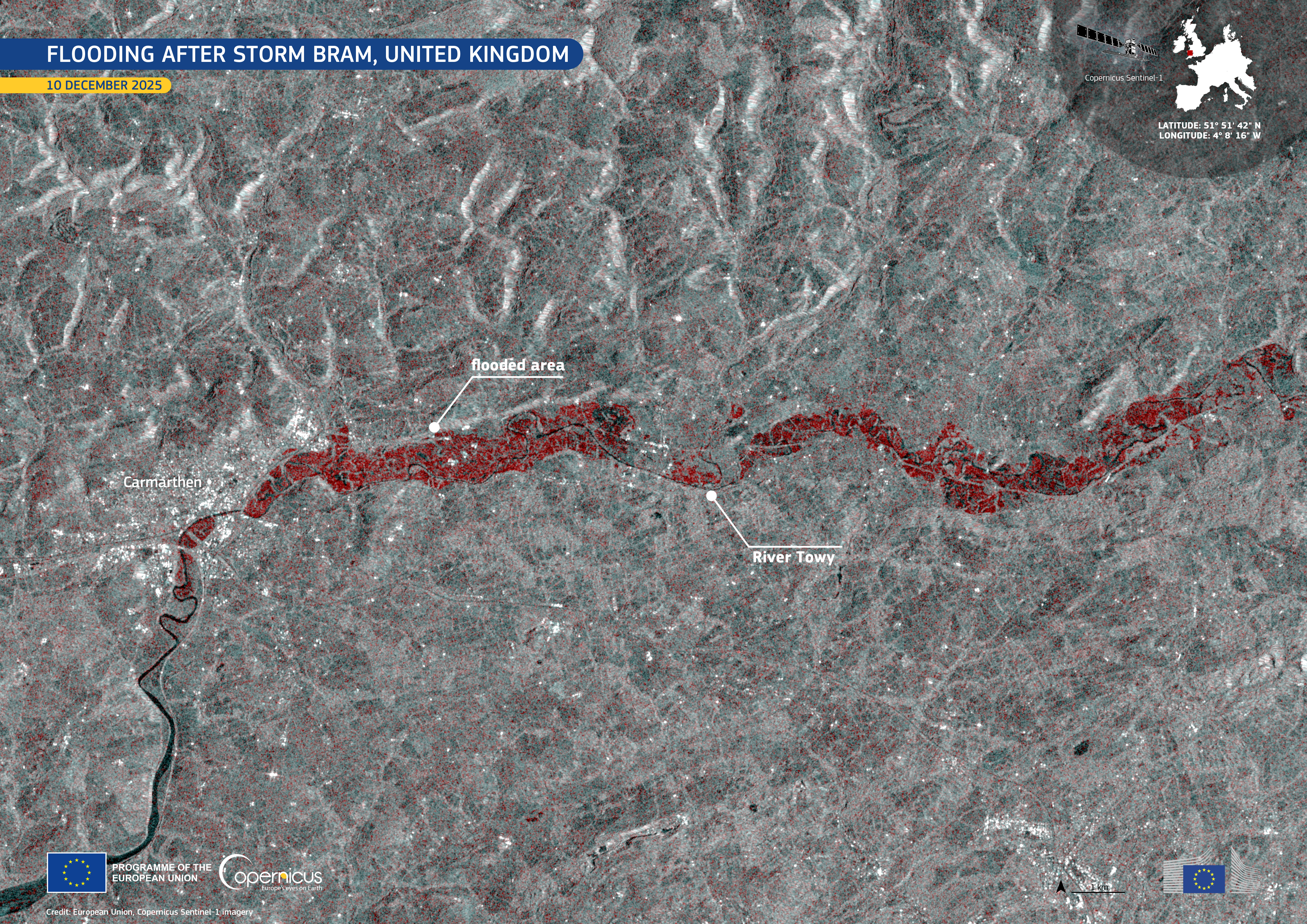
Flooding along the River Towy in Wales

At 5:30 p.m. on 9 December, over 1,600 properties were without power in south and west Wales after strong winds which also forced the closure of the Prince of Wales Bridge amid fears that corroded lampposts could collapse. Flooding led to the closure of many roads, including the A483, A487, A499 and A4042. All lines between Aberdare and Abercynon were closed due to flooding, whilst services between Blaenau Ffestiniog and Llandudno were cancelled after a train hit a fallen tree. Flood warnings affected the rivers Cothi, Ritec, Teifi, Towy, Usk and Vyrnwy.

On 9 December, flooding in southern England during the storm led to four people being rescued in Thornford after multiple cars were flooded and another near Ringwood after their car was swept 50 m (160 ft) downstream from a ford. The following day further rescues took place, including two people in Teigngrace, another two near Whitford and several in Cornwall as the road through Weare Giffard was closed. Flood warnings were issued for the Plymouth Sound, the south coasts of Cornwall and Devon, and the rivers Avon, Axe, Dart, Fowey, Plym, Teign and Yealm. Part of the pier at West Hoe in Plymouth collapsed during the storm. A section of the M66 motorway was closed near Ramsbottom due to flooding and a traffic collision which damaged the central barrier. Train services were cancelled between Plymouth and Totnes, Par and Newquay, and Bristol Parkway and Swindon due to flooding. The National Grid reported that over 4,000 homes were without power across England and Wales after the storm.

=== New Year's cold wave ===
New Year's cold wave
Meteorological history
- Formed: 1 January 2026
- Dissipated: 7 January 2026

Cold wave
- Lowest temp: −12.5 °C (9.5 °F) at Marham, England on 6 January
- Max. snowfall: 52 cm (20 in) at Tomintoul, Scotland on 4 January

Overall effects
- Fatalities: 4

Temperatures plunged across the British Isles at the start of 2026, leading to widespread warnings for snow and ice as well as amber cold-health alerts for all of England. On 28 December, the UK Health Security Agency (UKHSA) issued an amber cold-health alert for North East and North West England, in place from 8 p.m. that day to midday on 5 January, whilst the rest of England was under a yellow alert for the same period. At 8 p.m. on 31 December, this was upgraded to an amber alert for all of England and was extended to 10 a.m. on 6 January. Numerous weather warnings were issued by the Met Office, mostly for snow and ice: a yellow wind warning covered parts of north east Scotland from 9 p.m. on 31 December to 9 a.m. on 1 January; a yellow snow and ice warning covered northern Scotland from 6 a.m. on 1 January to midnight on 2 January; a yellow snow and ice warning covered Northern Ireland from midnight to 10 a.m. on 2 January; a yellow snow and ice warning covered parts of England and Wales from midnight to midday on 2 January; a yellow ice warning covered parts of South West England from 6 a.m. to 10 a.m. on 2 January; an amber snow warning covered parts of northern Scotland from midday on 2 January to midday on 3 January; an amber snow warning covered Shetland from midnight to midday on 3 January; a yellow snow warning covered the east coast of England for all of 3 January; and a yellow snow and ice warning covered Northern Ireland from midday on 3 January to midday on 5 January.

On 1 January, a man was pulled from the sea in Brighton after getting into difficulty and died whilst receiving medical treatment at the scene. On 2 January, a number of people got into difficulty in the sea at Withernsea, prompting a large search and rescue operation by HM Coastguard, Hornsea Inshore Rescue, Humberside Fire and Rescue Service, Humberside Police, the RNLI and Yorkshire Ambulance Service. One man was pulled from the water but died at the scene and a woman's body was recovered that evening, whilst a third person remained missing. The search was stood down at 4 p.m. on 3 January amid conditions described as "horrendous" with freezing temperatures, heavy snow and 3 m (9.8 ft) waves. The body of the missing 15-year-old girl was found on 15 January.

On 2 January, part of the A46 was closed after at least five vehicles slid off the road due to ice, the A38 was closed after a number of collisions and snow, and a slip road from the A453 to the M1 was closed due to a weather-related crash. Several snow gates were closed, including on the A93, A939 and B974, whilst travel was restricted on the A1 and A82. A bus crashed on the A952 and a car crash forced the closure of part of the A90 near Brechin, with both the A9 and A99 also fully closed between Helmsdale and Wick. During a 48-hour period, one response team rescued four ambulances stuck in snow and transported 48 members of NHS staff, whilst another group based in Fraserburgh rescued over 100 people stuck in cars and attended six traffic collisions in the same period, including a 12-vehicle pileup near New Leeds. No trains were running to or from Thurso and rail replacement buses were unable to run due to the snow, whilst the line between Laurencekirk and Stonehaven was closed the following day as snow depths exceeded the height of the rails. By 3 January, a snow depth of 37 cm (15 in) was recorded at Tomintoul, with seven Scottish Professional Football League matches cancelled due to the weather. The following day, snow drifts of over 8 ft (2.4 m) were reported in Scotland, whilst travel disruption continued to worsen with Kirkwall and Sumburgh Airports closed and numerous flights out of Aberdeen Airport, including all from British Airways, KLM and Loganair cancelled. Hundreds of schools announced closures across northern Scotland, including 170 in Aberdeenshire alone.

On 5 January, the lowest temperatures recorded overnight in each nation were −10.9 °C (12.4 °F) at Shap, Cumbria; −10 °C (14 °F) at Sennybridge, Powys; −9 °C (16 °F) at Tulloch Bridge, Highland; and −7 °C (19 °F) at Killylane, County Antrim. The runways at City of Derry Airport, Isle of Man Airport and Liverpool John Lennon Airport were closed for several hours due to snow and ice, with over 30 cancellations at the latter, whilst several flights from Aberdeen, Belfast City, Belfast International and Inverness Airports were cancelled, with the former temporarily suspending operations entirely. Eurostar trains were unable to reach the Netherlands from St Pancras due to the weather, leading to several cancellations. Suspended rail services in Wales included those between Blaenau Ffestiniog and Llandudno Junction, as well as between Machynlleth and Pwllheli, with no rail replacement for the latter, whilst in Scotland they included those from Aberdeen to Dundee and Inverness and Inverness to Kyle of Lochalsh, Thurso and Wick, with LNER issuing a 'do not travel' warning between Edinburgh Waverley and Aberdeen. Translink warned of disruption to all services and Stagecoach suspended all services in Aberdeen and Aberdeenshire, whilst road travel was discouraged in North Wales as bus services were suspended with many drivers stuck in the snow. Hundreds of schools were closed for the first day back after winter break, including over 170 in Northern Ireland and dozens across Wales. On 6 January, the lowest temperatures of the cold snap were recorded as nine weather stations registered temperatures below −10 °C (14 °F), with −12.5 °C (9.5 °F) measured in Marham, Norfolk. Aberdeenshire Council declared a major incident after several days of heavy snowfall, saying they were looking at a "prolonged period of significant impacts" due to the weather. Over 1,000 schools were shut across the country, including at least 384 in Wales, 320 in Scotland, 239 in England and 203 in Northern Ireland. Rail disruption continued, with the Glasgow Subway unable to open due to ice causing a power failure. One Scottish Premiership match and four Scottish Championship matches were cancelled. On 7 January, over 400 schools remained closed across Scotland, however travel disruption started to ease with less flights and trains being cancelled nationwide. A bus and a school coach collided due to icy conditions in Reading, leaving 18 people including nine children injured, whilst another school bus crashed into a ditch in Chilmington Green after skidding on black ice on the A28 road, although no injuries were reported.

=== Storm Goretti ===
Storm Goretti
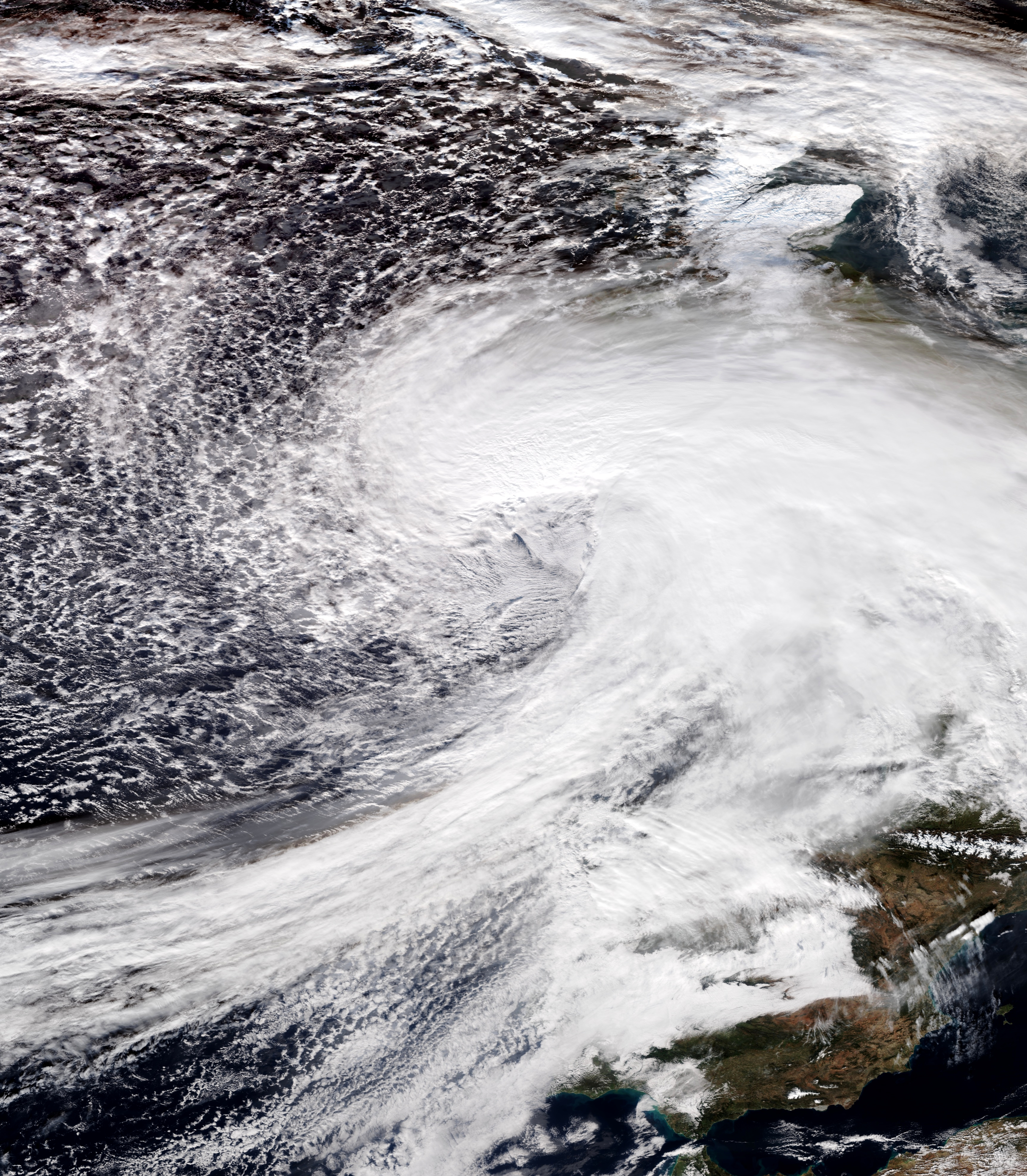
- Goretti on 8 January

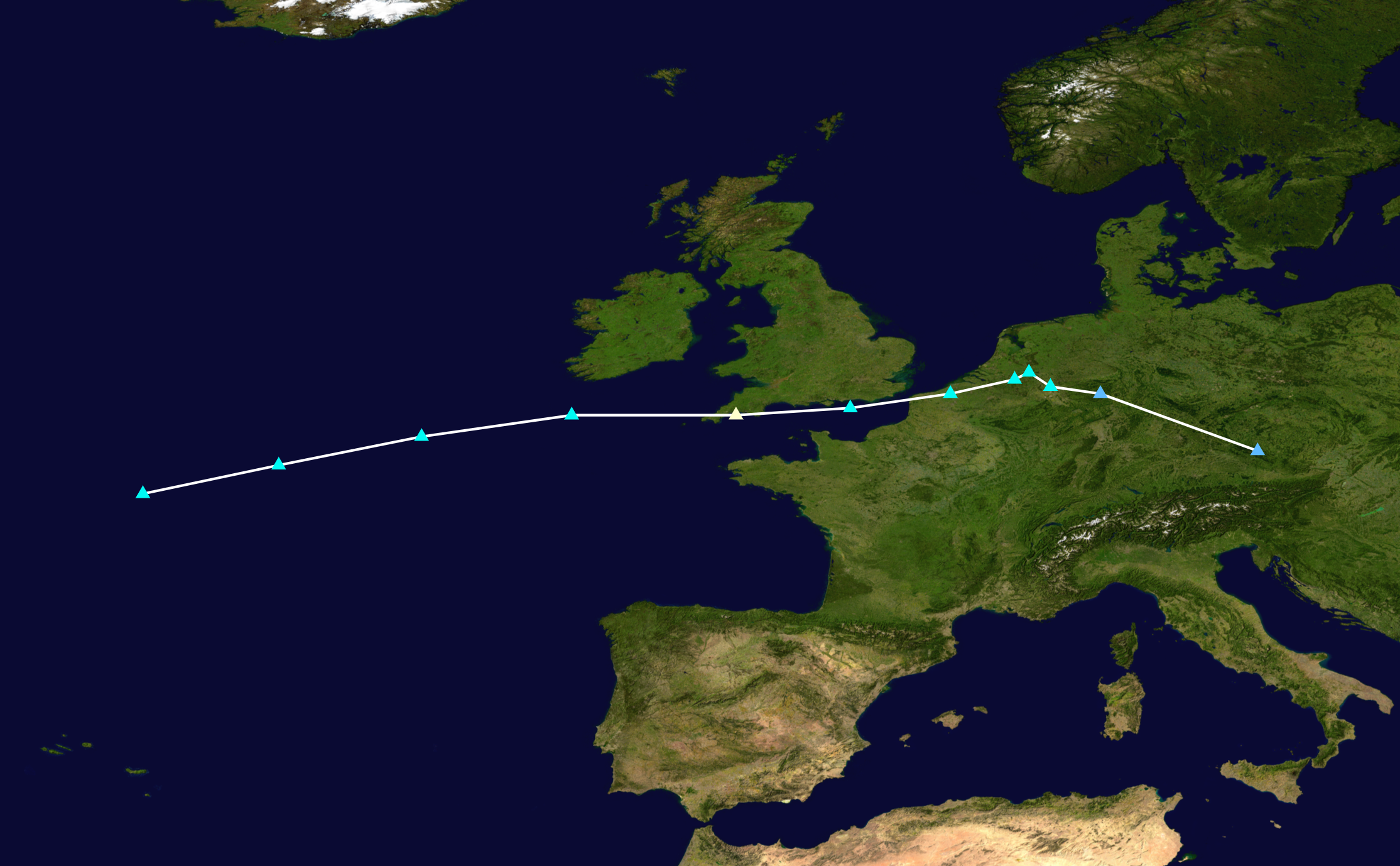
- Path of Storm Goretti
- Date of impact: 8–10 January 2026
- Maximum wind gust: 123 mph (55 m/s; 107 kn; 198 km/h) at Fort Albert, Guernsey
- Lowest pressure: 966 hPa (28.53 inHg)
- Fatalities: 1
- Power outages: >190,000

Storm Goretti was named by Météo-France on 6 January 2026 and brought strong winds and heavy rain to large areas of the country, as well as parts of Western Europe. Numerous weather warnings were issued by the Met Office, mostly for wind and snow: a yellow wind warning covered parts of southwest England from 3 p.m. to midnight on 8 January; a red wind warning covered parts of Cornwall from 4 p.m. to 11 p.m. on 8 January; a yellow snow warning covered parts of central England and Wales from 6 p.m. on 8 January to midday on 9 January; and an amber snow warning covered parts of the West Midlands and Wales from 8 p.m. on 8 January to 9 a.m. on 9 January.

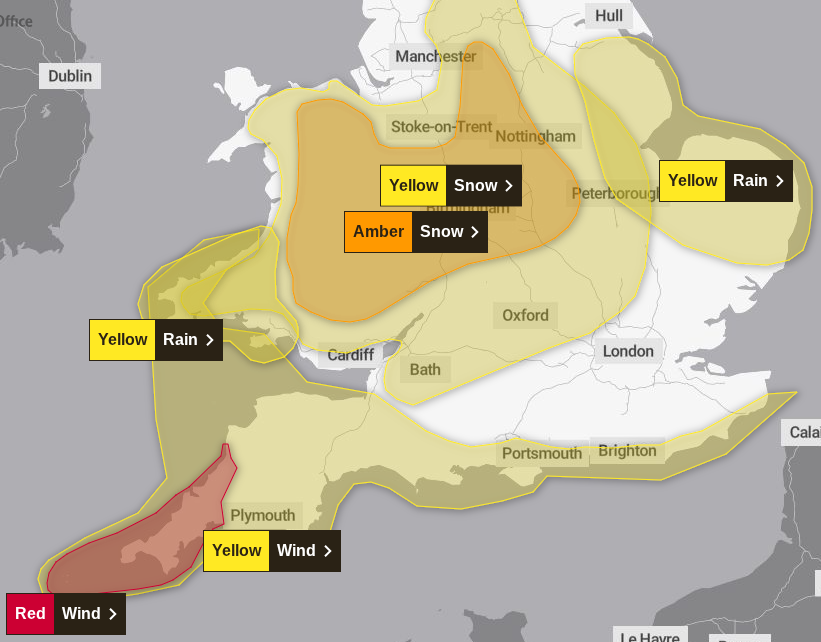
Weather warnings issued by the Met Office on 8 January

On 8 January, a man was killed in Mawgan-in-Meneage after a tree fell onto a caravan amid strong winds. A major incident was declared in the Channel Islands whilst at least 100 schools across Cornwall closed early due to the storm, with gusts reaching 123 mph (198 km/h) at Fort Albert on Alderney. Waves of over 26 ft (7.9 m) were recorded between Land's End and the Isles of Scilly. The Tamar Bridge and Alderney, Guernsey and Jersey Airports closed due to the wind, with all trains in Cornwall and from Exeter St Davids to Barnstaple and Okehampton being suspended. Two apartment buildings in St Peter Port were among several structures evacuated overnight, with around 50 residents being relocated to hotels. Flooding and fallen trees caused disruption on numerous roads, including the A30, A35, A386 and A399. Hundreds of fallen trees were reported by the governments of the Channel Islands which, when combined with structural damage caused by the winds, forced the closure of over 100 roads and all schools in Guernsey on 9 January, with many schools in Jersey also closed or opening later than usual. The sports centre at Springfield Stadium was closed due to storm damage, and a £13,000 polytunnel was destroyed during strong winds. whilst lead was ripped from Truro Cathedral's roof. Severe damage including fallen trees, crushed cars, unroofed buildings, displaced boats and damaged solar panels and wind turbines was reported around Cornwall.

South West Water reported around 15,000 properties were without water around Helston and Lizard after a water treatment works in Wendron was damaged. Residents in Grampound were forced to evacuate due to a gas leak caused by a tree damaging a gas service governor. In Penzance, "hundreds of thousands" of pounds worth of damage was caused to Mennaye Field, where the main stand had large chunks of its roof torn off, whilst a seasonal ice rink at Watergate Bay Hotel sustained "considerable damage". A "significant landslip" forced the closure of A386 road, with several other roads closed due to fallen trees. Plymouth City Council said it had dealt with 17 fallen trees, with over 60 more tree-related incidents awaiting attention. Around 30 schools were closed in Cornwall on 9 January, with a further 59 opening late. Cornwall Council said its teams had cleared roads of over 550 fallen trees, with around 600 more incidents awaiting response. Two birds were killed at Paradise Park, and almost 100 trees, including the country's tallest Acer cissifolium, were lost on St Michael's Mount, where winds of up to 111 mph (179 km/h) were recorded.

The only road connecting the Isle of Portland to mainland Britain was closed for several hours due to waves crashing over the causeway, whilst the Abbotsbury Subtropical Gardens were closed due to storm damage. A total of 24 shipping containers fell from two vessels off the coast of the Isle of Wight amid strong winds. DFDS said all ferry services between Dover and France had been disrupted, whilst flooding and power cuts were reported in several locations around the South East. Beach huts were damaged in Hastings and large parts of a sea wall were knocked over in Folkestone. Around 16,500 properties in the East Grinstead area were without water following a supply issue caused by the storm.

Rail services from Cheltenham Spa to Bristol Parkway, Bristol Temple Meads and Swindon were cancelled, whilst Birmingham and East Midlands Airports suspended operations due to the weather. Snow depths reached 16 cm (6.3 in) at Lake Vyrnwy, whilst over 150 schools were closed across Wales due to the snow. Disruption was reported on the Heart of Wales line and no trains were running between Birmingham and Cardiff, with travel on many major roads also being disrupted. Travel disruption in the North West included the closure of the A57 and A628 and trains being cancelled between Birmingham and Liverpool Lime Street, Guide Bridge and Hadfield, and Buxton and Hazel Grove.

On 10 January, the National Grid reported that over 190,000 properties had lost power due to the storm.

=== Storm Ingrid ===
Storm Ingrid
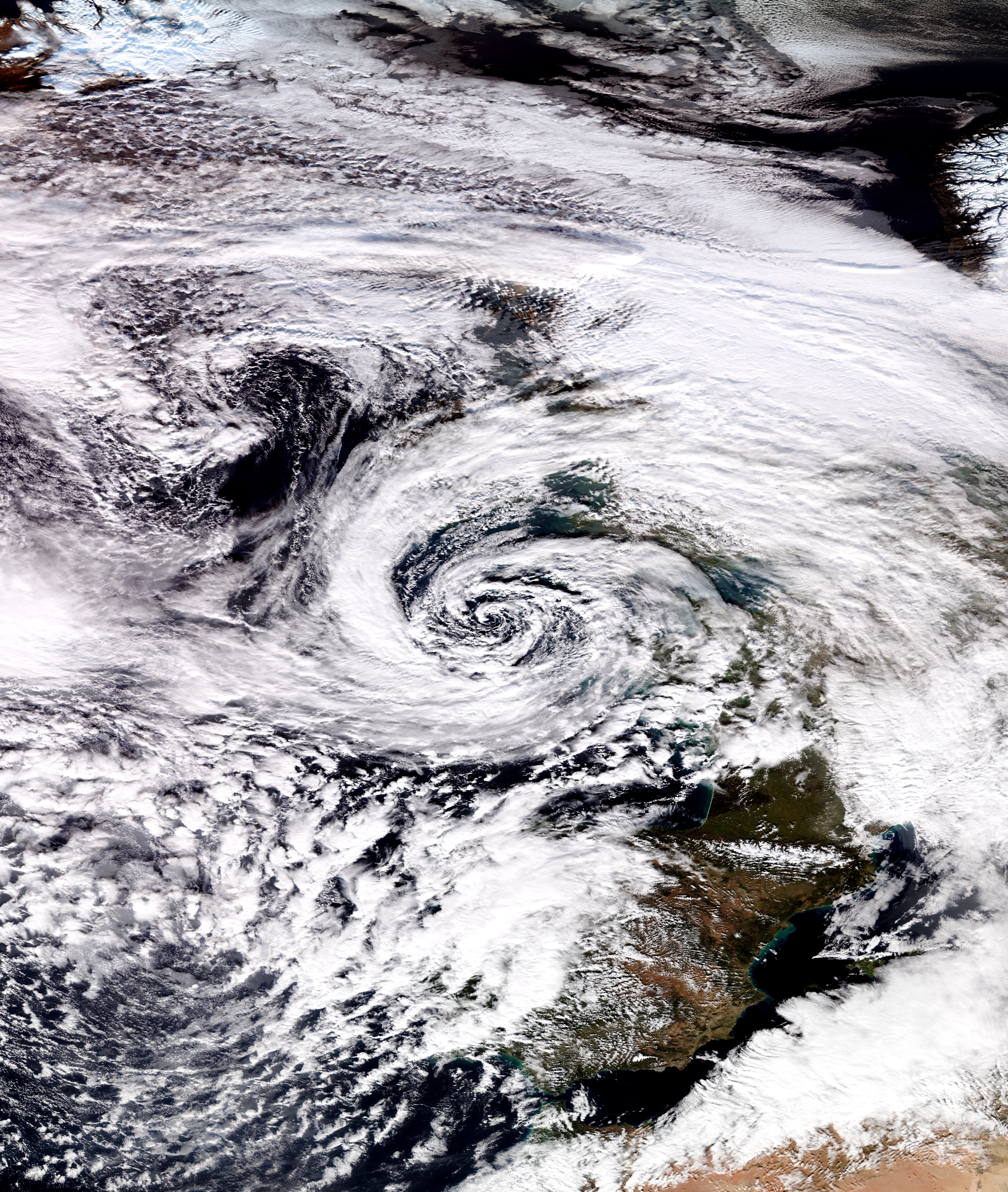
- Ingrid on 23 January

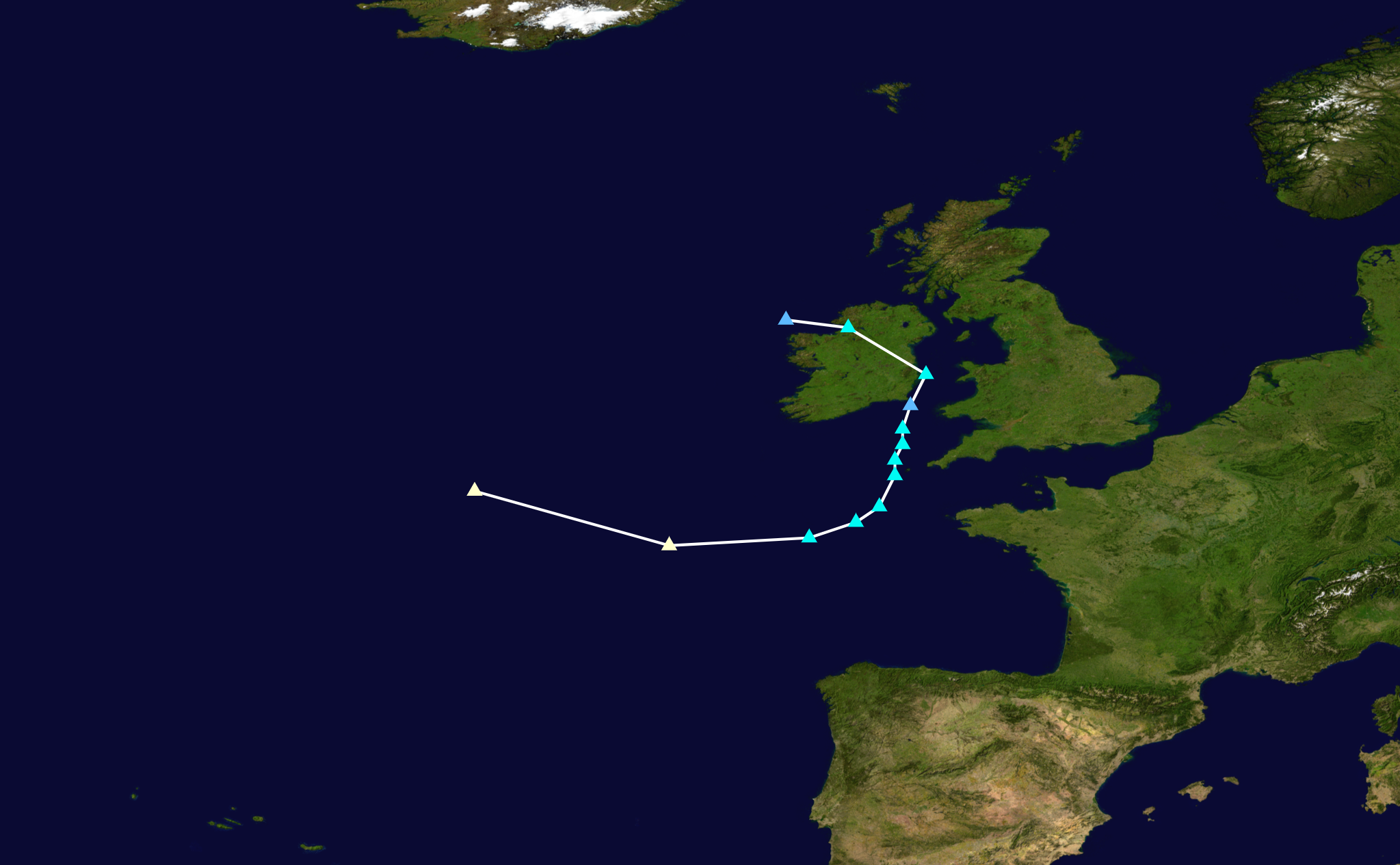
- Path of Storm Ingrid
- Date of impact: 23–25 January 2026
- Lowest pressure: 954 hPa (28.17 inHg)

Storm Ingrid was named by the IPMA on 20 January 2026 and brought strong winds and heavy rain to parts of the South West and Wales. The Met Office issued a yellow weather warning for rain and wind covering parts of southwest England and southern wales from 2 a.m. on 23 January to 9 a.m. on 24 January, which was later extended to 10 p.m.

On 23 January, Network Rail issued its first black alert since 2014 from 8:30 p.m. to 10:30 p.m. as 12 ft (3.7 m) waves were expected to hit the South Devon Railway sea wall. This alert closed the line between Exeter St Davids and Newton Abbot until 2 p.m. the next day, whilst the Looe Valley Line, which runs from Liskeard to Looe, was closed due to flooding. The Environment Agency issued 16 flood warnings around Devon and Cornwall. The Grand Pier in Teignmouth was badly damaged by waves overnight into 24 January, with part of it being washed away. Parts of the sea wall at Dawlish were also damaged, with a 90 ft (27 m) section of it crumbling. Several properties were damaged by waves in Torcross, whilst sand drifts trapped vehicles in Exmouth. Flooding cancelled rail services between Par and Newquay whilst the A377 was blocked by a fallen tree near Lapford. A section of the pier in South Shields also collapsed during the storm; it had previously been damaged in 2023 during Storm Babet, with repairs still ongoing when Ingrid hit. On 25 January, Network Rail said a limited service was operating in Dawlish after the track had been inspected following the collapse of the sea wall in two places; a Great Western Railway spokesman said the storm had left "significant debris" along 2 mi (3.2 km) of the track.

=== Storm Chandra ===
Storm Chandra
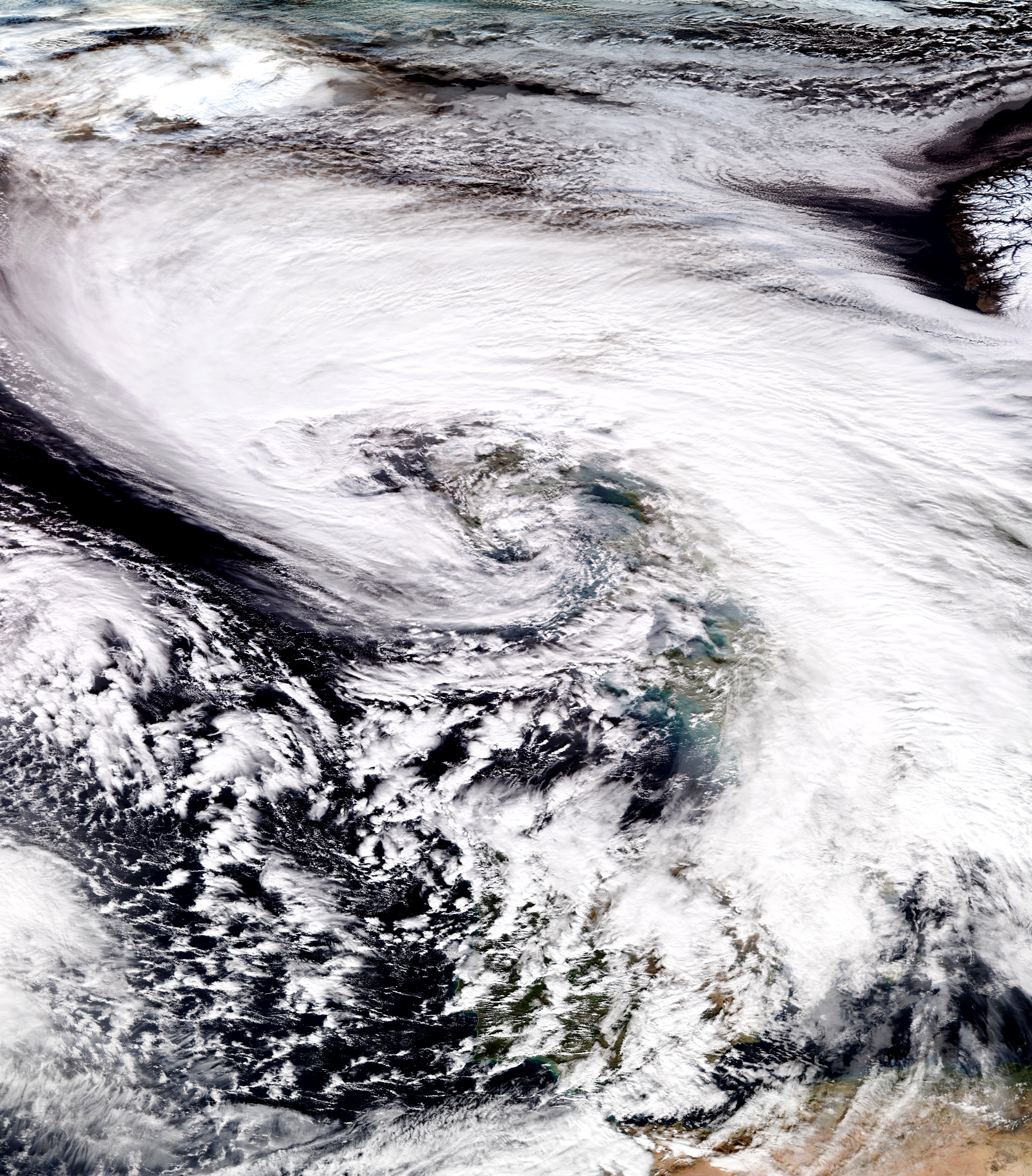
- Chandra on 27 January

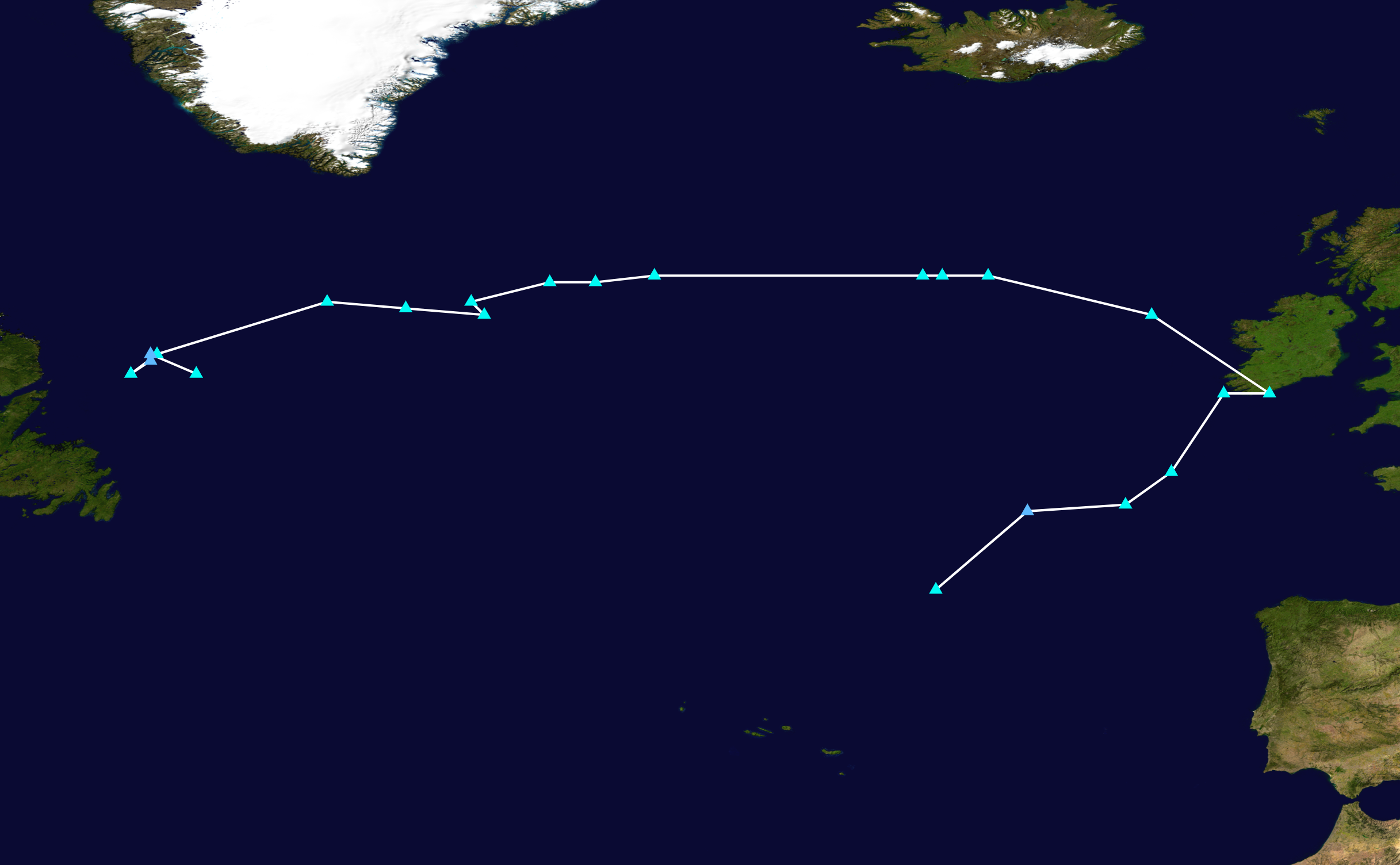
- Path of Storm Chandra
- Date of impact: 26-28 January 2026
- Maximum wind gust: 73 mph (33 m/s; 63 kn; 117 km/h) at Morfa Nefyn, Wales
- Lowest pressure: 958 hPa (28.29 inHg)
- Fatalities: 1
- Power outages: 30,000+

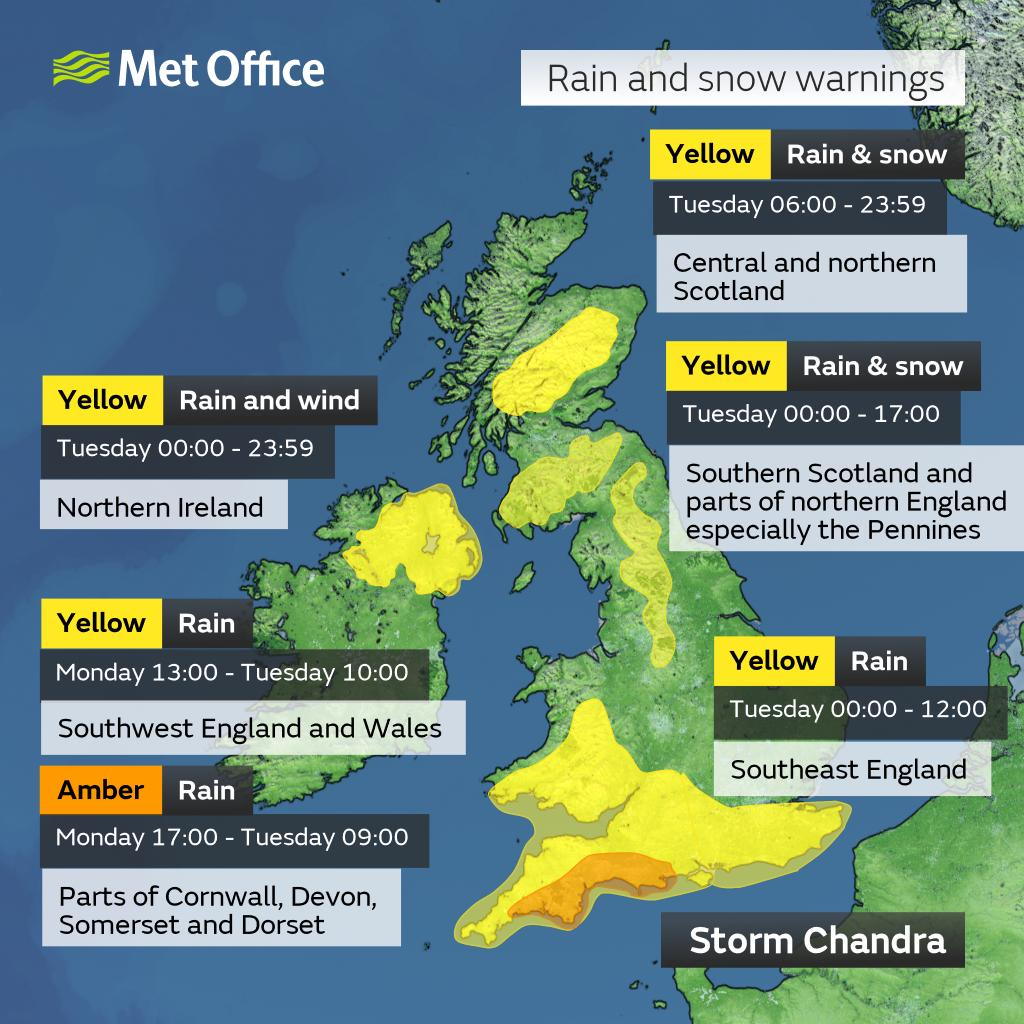
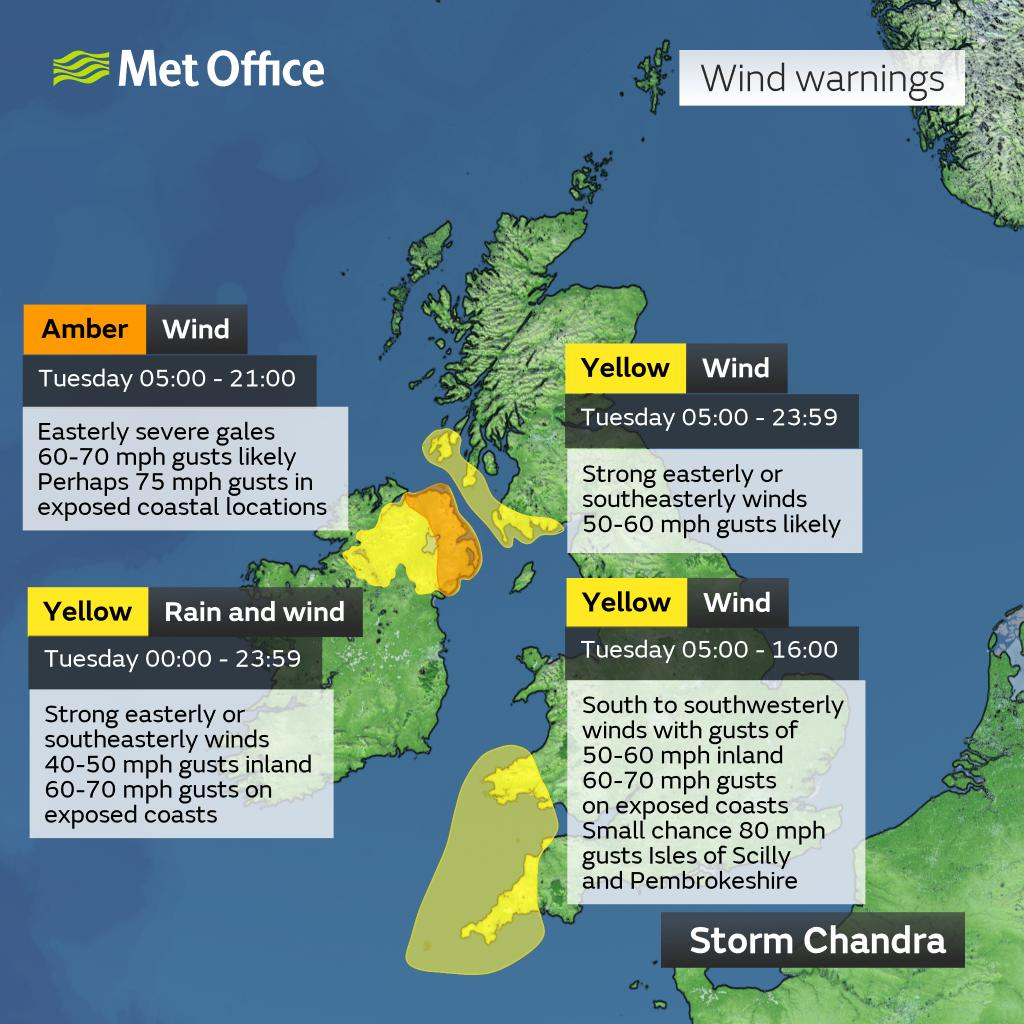
Weather warnings issued for Storm Chandra in the UK

Storm Chandra was named by the Met Office on 26 January 2026 and was forecast to bring strong winds and heavy rain to large areas of the country. Several weather warnings for wind, rain, snow and ice were issued by the Met Office: an amber rain warning covered parts of southwest England from 5 p.m. on 26 January to 9 a.m. on 27 January; a yellow rain warning covered parts of southwest England and south Wales from 6 p.m. on 26 January to 2 p.m. on 27 January; a yellow rain and snow warning covered parts of northern England, the north Midlands and southern Scotland from midnight to 5 p.m. on 27 January, whilst a separate warning covered parts of northern Scotland from 6 a.m. to midnight; a yellow wind and rain warning covered Northern Ireland from 2 a.m. to 9 p.m. on 27 January; an amber wind warning covered eastern Northern Ireland from 5 a.m. to 9 p.m. on 27 January; a yellow ice warning covered much of England, Scotland and Wales from midnight to 10 a.m. on 28 January; a yellow ice warning covered much of Northern Ireland from 3 a.m. to 10 a.m. on 28 January; and a yellow rain warning covered parts of southwest England from midday to midnight on 29 January.

One fatality was reported as a result of the storm, where a man in his 60s died after his lorry veered off the road and entered the River Avon in the New Forest.

== See also ==
- 2025–26 North American winter
- 2025–26 European windstorm season
- Tornadoes of 2025
- Tornadoes of 2026
