= Storm Goretti =

2026 windstorm over northwestern Europe

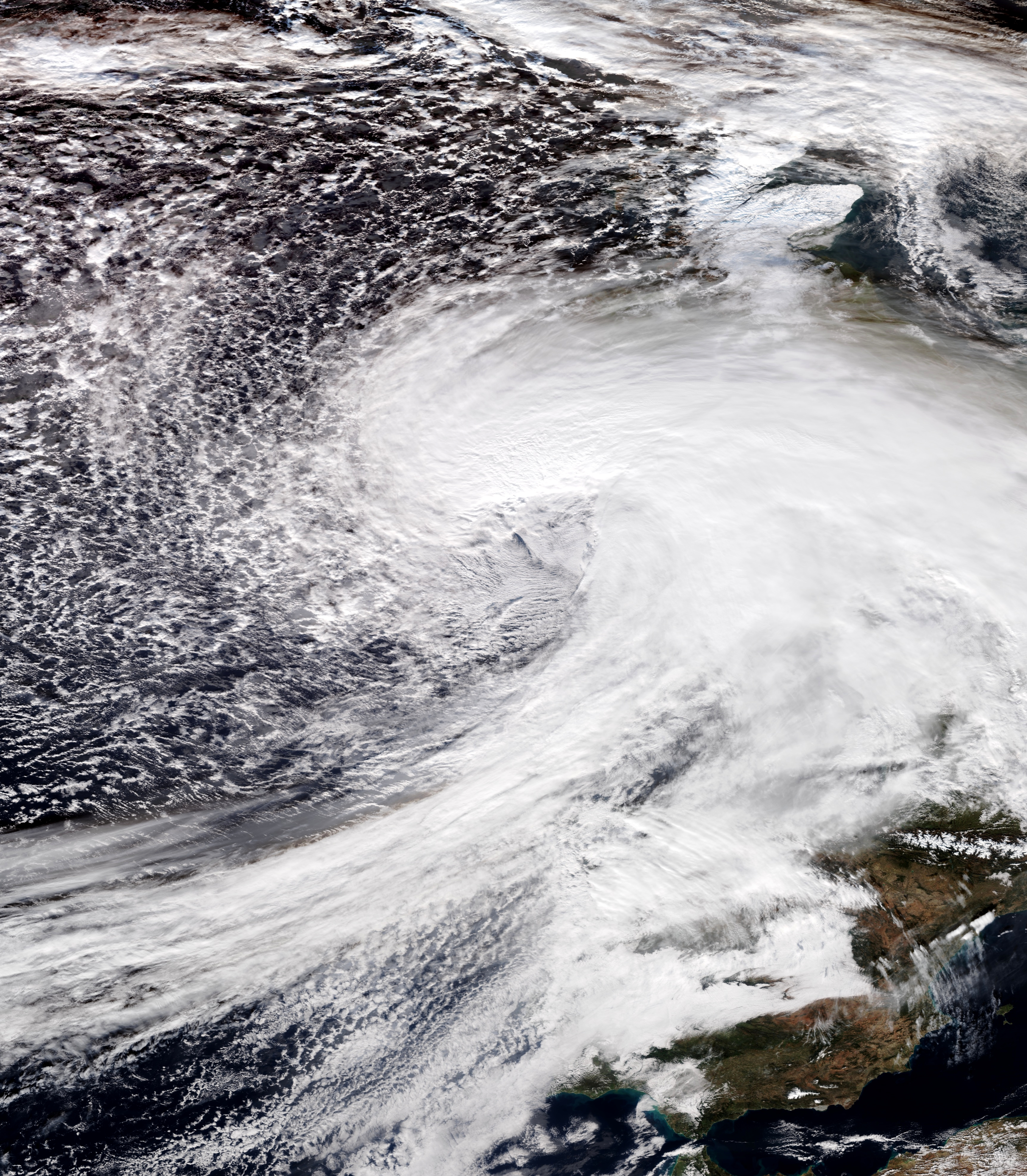
- Storm Goretti at 12:30 8th January 2026.

Meteorological history
- Formed: 6 January 2026
- Dissipated: 10 January 2026

Extratropical cyclone
- Highest gusts: 132 mph (59 m/s; 115 kn; 212 km/h) at Barfleur, Manche, France
- Lowest pressure: 969 hPa (726.8 mmHg; 28.61 inHg)

Overall effects
- Fatalities: 2 (1 indirect)
- Injuries: Unspecified
- Areas affected: United Kingdom, Channel Islands, France, Belgium, Netherlands, Germany, Spain (indirectly)
- Power outages: ~500,000
- Part of the 2025–26 European windstorm season

Storm Goretti, known as Storm Elli in Germany, was a powerful and damaging extratropical cyclone that affected parts of Western Europe. The seventh named (using the south-western group naming list) storm of the 2025–26 European windstorm season, Goretti was named by Météo France on 6 January 2026. The storm was expected to bring extreme wind gusts, potentially reaching near 160 km/h (100 mph) to western Cornwall and the Scilly Isles, upwards of 180 km/h (110 mph) to the Channel Islands, and strong gusts to northern France.

== Warnings and impact ==
=== United Kingdom ===
==== Warnings ====
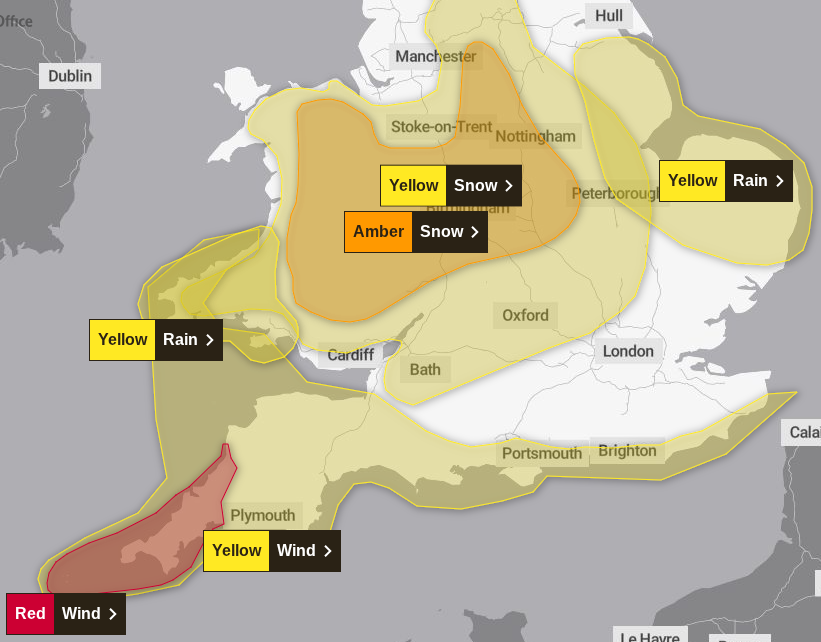
Weather warnings issued by the Met Office on 8 January

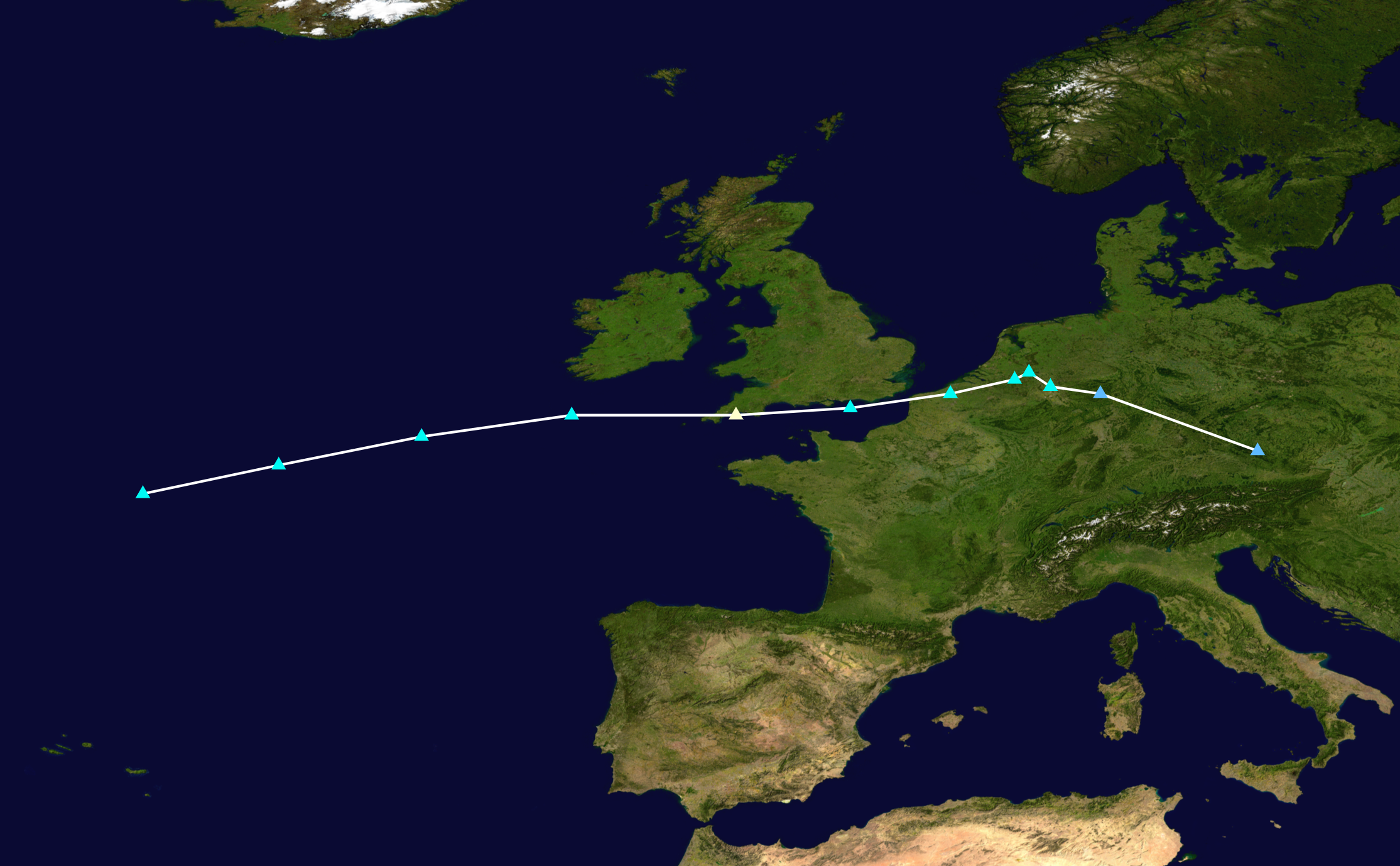
Map plotting the storm's track and intensity, according to the Saffir–Simpson scale Map key Saffir–Simpson scale Tropical depression (≤38 mph, ≤62 km/h) Tropical storm (39–73 mph, 63–118 km/h) Category 1 (74–95 mph, 119–153 km/h) Category 2 (96–110 mph, 154–177 km/h) Category 3 (111–129 mph, 178–208 km/h) Category 4 (130–156 mph, 209–251 km/h) Category 5 (≥157 mph, ≥252 km/h) Unknown Storm type Tropical cyclone Subtropical cyclone Extratropical cyclone, remnant low, tropical disturbance, or monsoon depression

On the afternoon of the 8 January 2026, the Met Office issued a red wind warning for parts of western Cornwall and the Isles of Scilly, with peak gusts of 130–160 km/h (80–100 mph) or more were expected in exposed areas. The red warning encompassed population centres like Truro, the Redruth/Camborne conurbation, Falmouth and Helston.

An amber snow warning was also in force for Wales, Midlands, South Yorkshire where 10–15 cm (4–6 in) of snow was expected widely, with up to 30 cm (12 in) on high ground (Wales and the Peak District). Rural communities were expected to be cut off; power cuts and mobile signal loss were likely. A yellow wind warning was also in force for Devon, west Wales, and along the south coast with peak gusts of 80–100 km/h (50–60 mph) likely fairly widely, and 100–110 km/h (60–70 mph) along exposed coasts and hills. A yellow rain warning was also in force for East Anglia and Lincolnshire, where 20–40mm of rain falling on frozen ground presented a high risk of surface water flooding, spray on roads, and localised property flooding.

The Meteorological Office of Jersey issued a red wind warning for the island, as they forecast peak winds to peak at 180 km/h (110 mph).

==== Impact ====
As Storm Goretti hit, a wind gust of 159 km/h (99 mph) was recorded at St Mary's Airport on the Scilly Isles. The National Coastwatch Institution recorded 198 km/h (123 mph) at Stepper Point, Padstow at 19:27. An emergency alert was sent to hundreds of thousands across the South West.

Around 50,000 homes and businesses in Cornwall, Devon and Isles of Scilly were without power. During the height of Storm Goretti, rail services were suspended between Plymouth and Penzance, including all branch lines throughout Cornwall serving Gunnislake, Newquay, Falmouth Docks, and St Ives. Similar closures were enforced between Exeter, Okehampton, and Barnstaple as the weather conditions intensified. In the Midlands, no services were running between Gloucester and Worcester, though some limited operations continued between Gloucester and Cheltenham Spa. Additionally, flooding completely halted all trains between Liskeard and Looe. The operator advised passengers not to attempt travel on these routes, as dangerous road conditions prevented the provision of rail replacement transport. Road travel was equally immobilised across the region by several major closures. In Cornwall, the A30 was closed in both directions between Nut Lane and the A394 due to a fallen tree, while the A3074 Trelhon Avenue was shut between Treloyhan Park Road and Albert Road.

Eighty per cent of the trees in St Michael's Mount wood fell. The National Trust will consider whether to replant tall species like Monterey pine, on the mount and its other west Cornwall properties, because of the likelihood of more frequent storms due to climate change.

Devon also faced significant disruption, with the A3079 Holsworthy Road and the A379 both closed in both directions, the latter also due to a fallen tree. Furthermore, the A386 was shut from the Monkleigh turn-off to Loxdown Road, and the A39 was closed between Clovelly Road and Buckleigh Road.

Storm Goretti's snowfall has been described as a "once-in-a-decade" event for the Midlands, as the storm collided with the cold air in place. Heavy, wet snow has caused significant distruption, bringing down power lines and leaving approximately 15,000 homes in the Midlands and Wales without electricity. Accumulations of 10–15 cm (4–6 in) were reported widely across the Amber warning area, with up to 30 cm (12 in) settling on higher ground in the Peak District and Wales. This has resulted in the closure of over 500 schools across Scotland and the Midlands, the suspension of runways at Birmingham and East Midlands airports, and hazardous drifting that has left several rural communities entirely cut off.

=== Bailiwicks of Guernsey and Jersey ===
Guernsey and Alderney sustained various levels of damage caused by the high winds. With significant damage recorded to a number of structures where trees had been blown over into residential properties, granite walls collapsing and some properties losing their roof in Alderney.

A block of flats housing 50 people was evacuated in the outskirts of St. Peter Port, Guernsey after a portion of the roof collapsed. No injuries were reported.

On 9 January 2026, the States of Guernsey closed all public and private schools in the island following damage sustained to the buildings and the conditions of the roads meant it was not deemed safe to travel. Over 112 trees were downed over the island, restricting passage, especially around the higher parishes in the south of the island.

In Jersey a major incident was declared as a result of the storm. Almost 130 km/h (80 mph) wind gusts were recorded locally, with reports of disruption to utilities in parts of the east. Some properties in St Ouen experienced brief power cuts after a storm-related fault, and a small number of homes in Gorey, Jersey temporarily lost water supplies.

=== France ===
France issued Red Warnings for violent winds (the highest possible level), with gusts up to 140 km/h (87 mph) expected between the night of 8 January and the morning of 9 January. Impacts include extreme danger from flying debris, widespread power outages, and a total halt to most transportation. For 8–9 January 2026, Météo-France issued Orange alerts for violent winds and snow/ice across the northern half of France, including Brittany, Normandy, and the Paris region. Storm Goretti was forecast to bring extreme gusts of 120–140 km/h (75–87 mph) to the English Channel coasts and up to 100 km/h (62 mph) inland, posing a high risk of falling trees and power outages. Simultaneously, heavy snowfall of 5–15 cm (2–6 in) was expected to cause major disruptions to SNCF rail services, grounded flights at major airports, and treacherous "black ice" on roads. Yellow alerts for coastal flooding also apply to northern shorelines due to high waves and storm surges.

=== Germany ===
For 8–9 January 2026, the German Weather Service (DWD) issued orange warnings for severe winter weather, including heavy snowfall, freezing rain, and strong winds across northern and central Germany, particularly affecting Lower Saxony, Schleswig-Holstein, Hamburg, and parts of North Rhine-Westphalia. Wind gusts of up to 90–110 km/h (56–68 mph) were recorded along the North Sea coast, with lower but still disruptive gusts inland. Storm Goretti's advance brought snow accumulations of up to about 15 cm (6 in) in northern areas, with the risk of dangerous ice and drifting snow, prompting school closures in major cities such as Hamburg and Bremen, as well as disruptions to public transport and the postponement of local Bundesliga matches.

The storm's impacts included major transport disruption. State-owned Deutsche Bahn suspended long-distance train services across northern Germany, warning passengers against travel as tracks were blocked by snow and ice. Hamburg Airport cancelled around 40 flights amid hazardous weather conditions.

Local authorities reported widespread disruption to rail and road networks and advised residents to avoid unnecessary journeys due to treacherous conditions. In northern Germany, public transport services faced delays and cancellations as crews worked to clear snow from lines and platforms. The storm also affected industrial operations, with companies such as Volkswagen temporarily halting production at some plants due to supply-chain interruptions linked to the severe weather.

=== Belgium and the Netherlands ===
Belgium issued yellow wind, rain, snow and ice warnings for the country. The Netherlands issued yellow and orange ice warnings as the storm's northern edge brought some snow.

=== Spain ===
Although Spain was not directly impacted by Goretti, an 81-year-old man died in San Sebastián after winds pushed him to fall into the Urumea River.

== See also ==
- 2025–26 European windstorm season
- Winter of 2025–26 in Great Britain and Ireland
