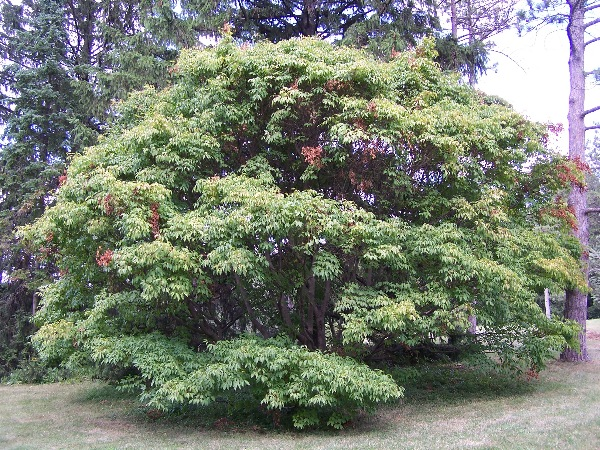
- Morton Arboretum acc. 1073-58-1

Conservation status
- Least Concern (IUCN 3.1)

Scientific classification
- Kingdom: Plantae
- Clade: Tracheophytes
- Clade: Angiosperms
- Clade: Eudicots
- Clade: Rosids
- Order: Sapindales
- Family: Sapindaceae
- Genus: Acer
- Section: Acer sect. Negundo
- Series: Acer ser. Cissifolia
- Species: A. cissifolium

Binomial name
- Acer cissifolium (Siebold and Zucc.) K.Koch

= Acer cissifolium =

Species of maple

Acer cissifolium (vine-leafed maple, vineleaf maple, and variations thereof; Japanese: ミツデカエデ, romanized: mitsudekaede) is a maple native to Japan, from southern Hokkaidō south through Honshū and Shikoku to Kyūshū.

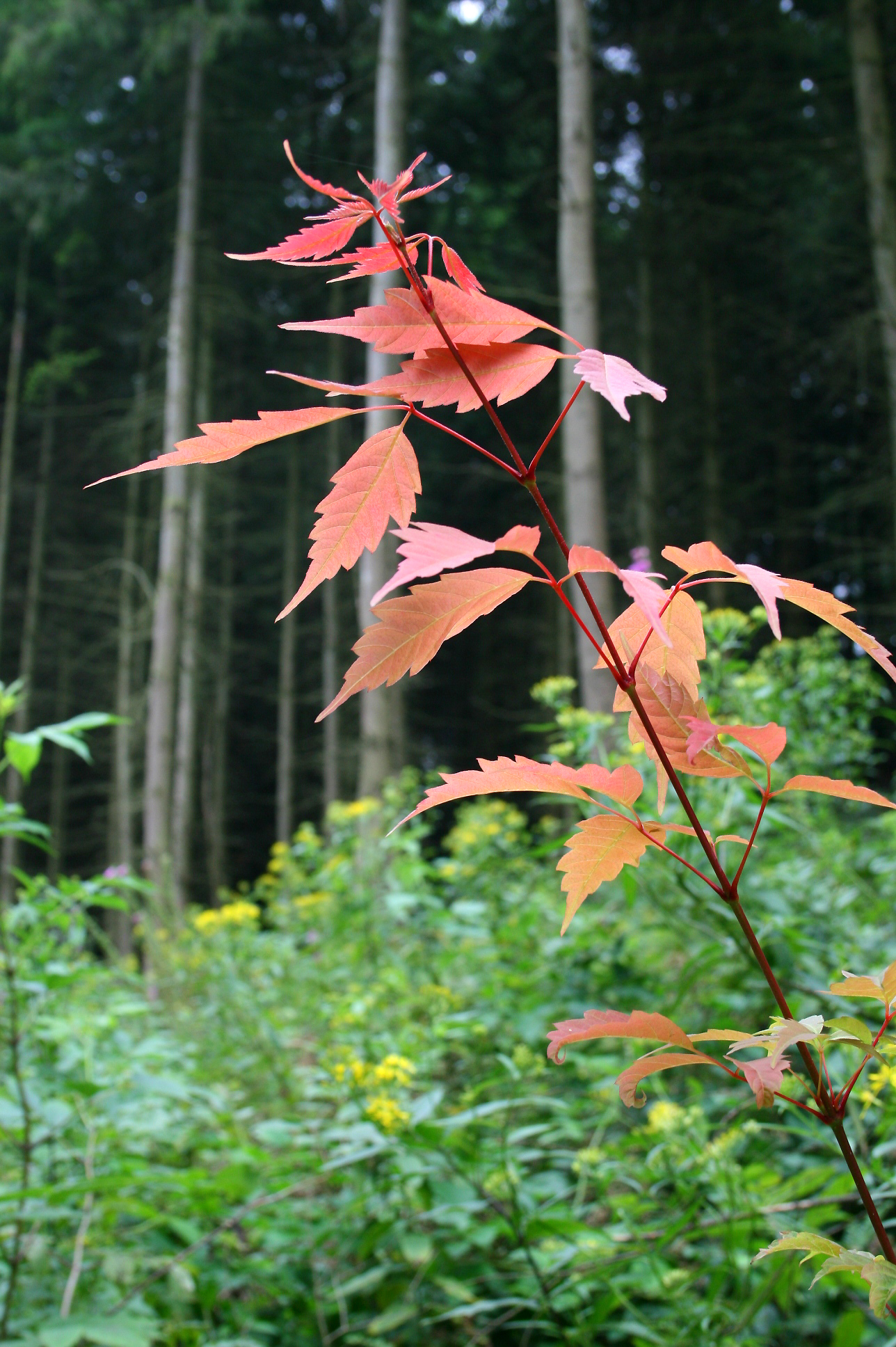
Young Vine-leafed Maple

It is a deciduous small tree or large shrub growing to 5–10 m (rarely 15 m) in height, with smooth grey bark. The young shoots are green, often tinged pink, hairy at first with whitish hairs, becoming grey in the second year. The leaves are trifoliate, with a very slender red petiole up to 10 cm long; the three leaflets are 4–10 cm long and 2–4 cm broad, with 1–2 cm petiolules, and coarsely serrated margins. They are matte green above, paler and slightly shiny below, and turn pale yellow to pinkish in autumn. The flowers are produced in pendulous racemes 10–16 cm long, each flower with four sepals and petals; it is dioecious with male and female flowers on separate trees. The fruit is a paired samara, the nutlets are 7 mm long, the wings 15–25 mm long, spreading at an acute angle.

Both the scientific and English names refer to the resemblance of its leaves to those of Cissus, a genus in the vine family.

== Cultivation ==
This maple is common in cultivation although few cultivars are known. A variegated cultivar 'Gotenbanishiki' has been selected in Japan. Female trees are often propagated by layering and sold in the nursery trade.

Acer cissifolium is similar to its closest relative A. henryi (rare in cultivation) and its close relative A. negundo (common in cultivation with many cultivars). It may be distinguished from the former by its shoots turning grey in their second year (remaining green for several years in A. henryi), and from the latter by its consistently trifoliate leaves, never with the five leaflets common in A. negundo. Mislabeling occurs between these three species.
