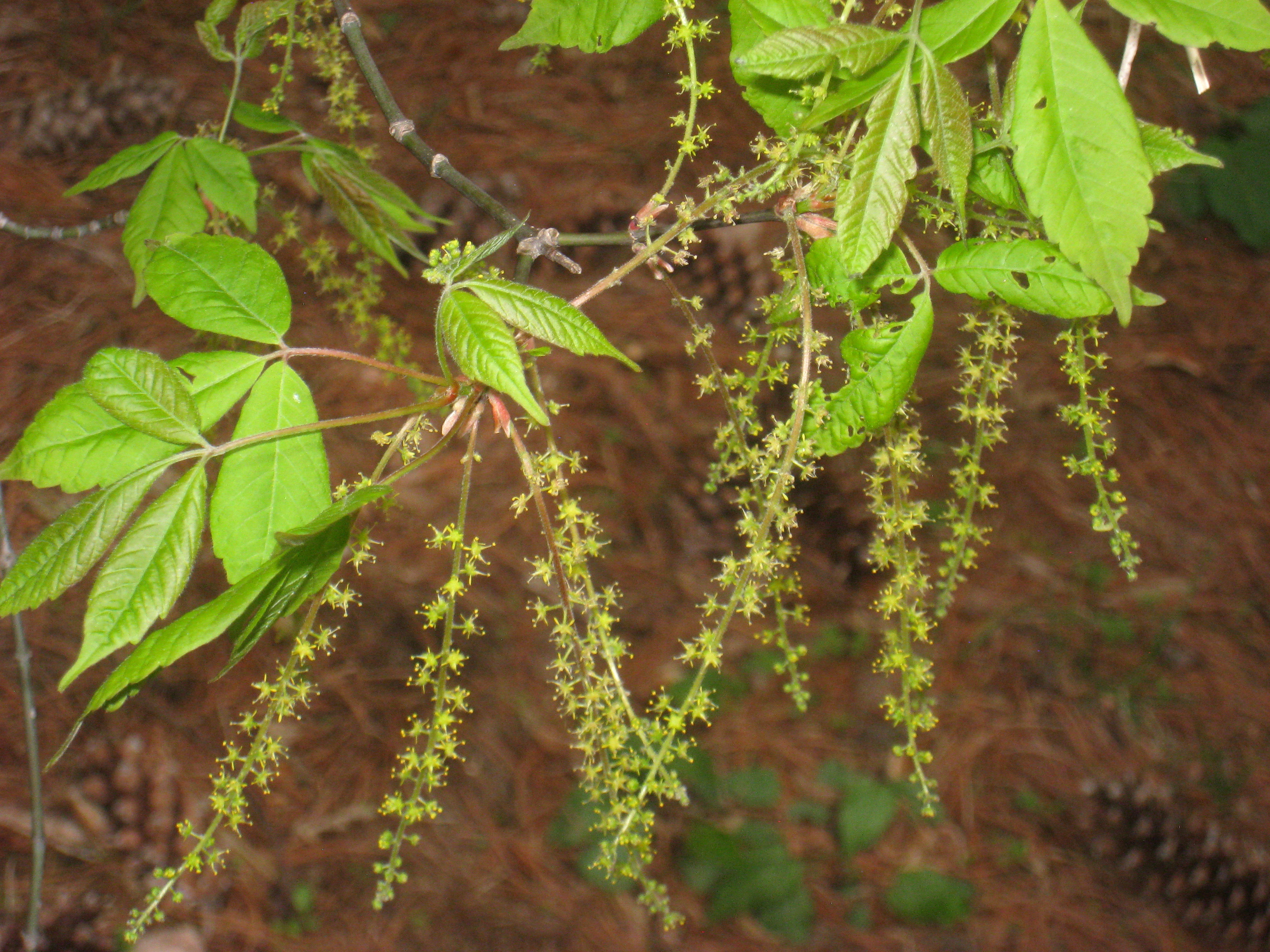

Scientific classification
- Kingdom: Plantae
- Clade: Tracheophytes
- Clade: Angiosperms
- Clade: Eudicots
- Clade: Rosids
- Order: Sapindales
- Family: Sapindaceae
- Genus: Acer
- Section: Acer sect. Negundo
- Series: Acer ser. Cissifolia
- Species: A. henryi

Binomial name
- Acer henryi Pax 1889

Synonyms
- Acer cissifolium subsp. henryi (Pax) A.E.Murray; Acer henryi f. intermedium W.P.Fang; Acer henryi var. serratum Pamp.; Acer stenobotrys Franch. ex W.P.Fang; Crula henryi Nieuwl.

= Acer henryi =

Species of plant

Acer henryi is an Asian species of maple. It has been found only in China (Anhui, Fujian, Gansu, Guizhou, Henan, Hubei, Hunan, Jiangsu, Shaanxi, Shanxi, Sichuan, Zhejiang).

Acer henryi is a small tree up to 10 meters tall, dioecious (meaning that male and female flowers are on separate trees). Leaves are compound with 3 leaflets, thin and papery, up to 12 cm wide and 5 cm across usually with 3 lobes, with a waxy, whitish underside. Leaflets sometimes have a few shallow teeth but no lobes.
