= 2026 Pacific typhoon season =

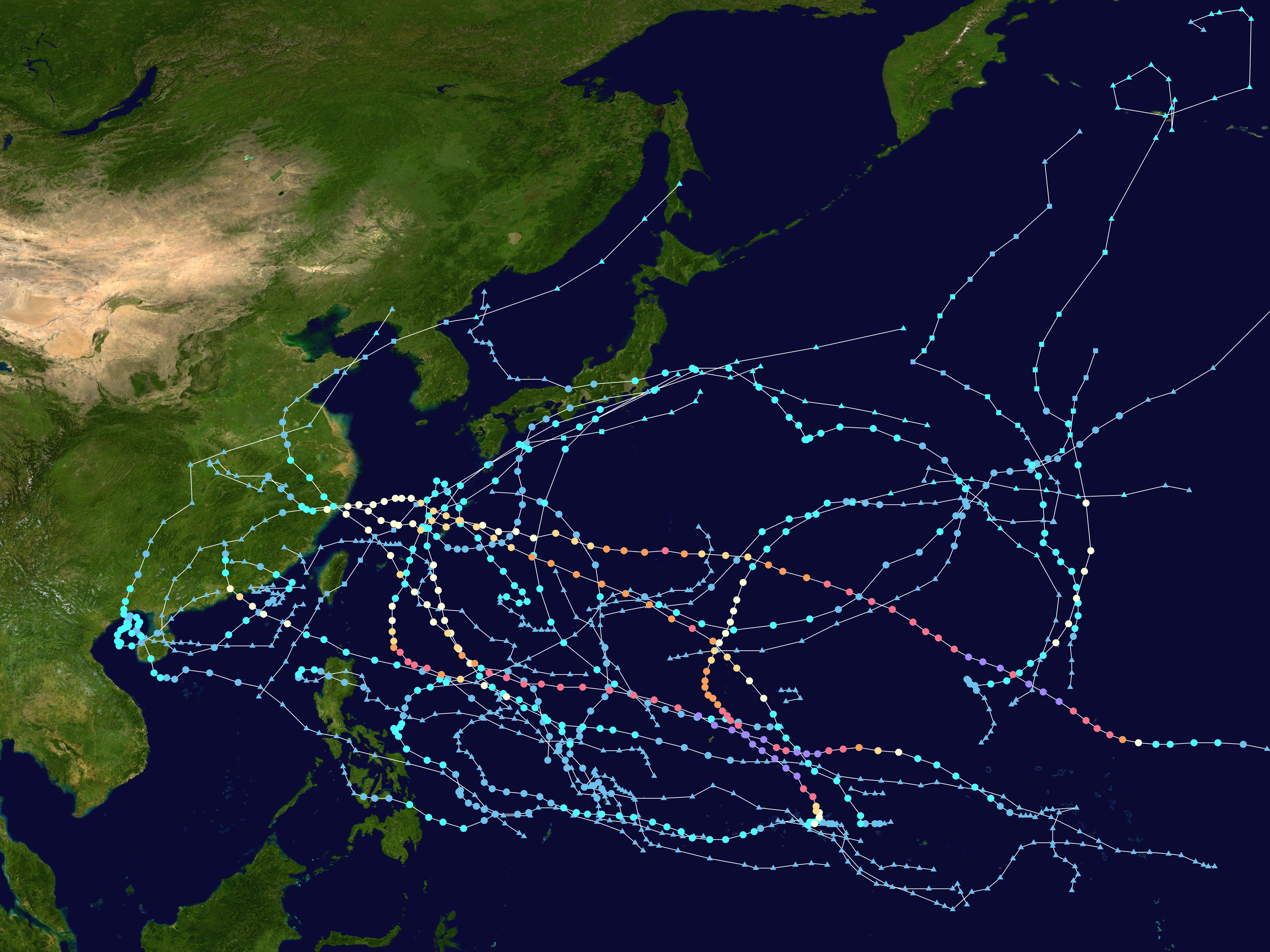
- Season summary map

Seasonal boundaries
- First system formed: January 13, 2026
- Last system dissipated: Season ongoing

Strongest storm
- Name: Bavi & Champi
  - Maximum winds: 215 km/h (130 mph) (10-minute sustained)
  - Lowest pressure: 900 hPa (mbar)

Seasonal statistics
- Total depressions: 47, 2 unofficial (Note: On July 14, a tropical depression was designated by PAGASA outside their area of responsibility without a given name, and were not monitored by the JMA or JTWC as a formal system. Therefore, it is marked as unofficial.) (Note: On August 7, NCHMF identified a tropical depression in the Gulf of Tonkin. It was also recognized by HKO the following day, but was not monitored by the JMA or JTWC as a formal system. Therefore, it is marked as unofficial.)
- Total storms: 32
- Typhoons: 15
- Very strong typhoons: 12
- Violent typhoons: 4
- Total fatalities: 352+ total
- Total damage: > $10.6 billion (2026 USD)

Related articles
- 2026 Atlantic hurricane season; 2026 Pacific hurricane season; 2026 North Indian Ocean cyclone season

The 2026 Pacific typhoon season is an ongoing event in the annual cycle of tropical cyclone formation in the northwestern Pacific Ocean. The season runs throughout 2026, although most tropical cyclones typically develop between May and November. The first named storm of the season, Nokaen, developed on January 15, marking the first named storm to form in January since Pabuk during the 2019 season, and the earliest start to a Pacific typhoon season since then. The season's first typhoon, Sinlaku, reached typhoon intensity on April 10 and subsequently became the season's first violent typhoon on April 12. Sinlaku affected the Northern Mariana Islands, causing extensive damage in Tinian and Saipan.

Multiple typhoon-force landfalls were recorded in Zhejiang, China, most notably from typhoons Bavi, Dolphin, and Saudel. The season also saw a series of strong storms form late in the season, most notably Typhoon Nolo, which became the first cross-over storm since Typhoon Dora in 2023, and Typhoon Champi in mid-October, which became the strongest storm of the season with a minimum central pressure of 900 hPa (26.58 inHg) and went on to affect the Mariana Islands and Taiwan.

The scope of this article is limited to the Pacific Ocean north of the equator between 100°E and the 180th meridian. Within the northwestern Pacific Ocean, two separate agencies assign names to tropical cyclones, which can result in a system having two names. The Japan Meteorological Agency (JMA) (Note: The Japan Meteorological Agency is the official Regional Specialized Meteorological Centre for the western Pacific Ocean.) names a tropical cyclone when it is estimated to have 10-minute sustained winds of at least 65 km/h (40 mph) anywhere in the basin. The Philippine Atmospheric, Geophysical and Astronomical Services Administration (PAGASA) assigns names to tropical cyclones that move into or form as a tropical depression within the Philippine Area of Responsibility (PAR), defined as the area between 135°E and 115°E and between 5°N and 25°N, regardless of whether the JMA has already named the system. Tropical depressions monitored by the United States Joint Typhoon Warning Center (JTWC) (Note: The Joint Typhoon Warning Center is a joint United States Navy–United States Air Force task force that issues tropical cyclone warnings for the western Pacific Ocean and other regions.) are given a numerical designation with a "W" suffix, which means "west", a reference to the western Pacific region. (Note: A super typhoon is an unofficial category used by the JTWC for a typhoon with winds of at least 240 km/h (150 mph).)

== Seasonal forecasts ==
TSR forecasts Date	Tropical storms	Total typhoons	Intense TCs	ACE	Ref.
Average (1991–2020)	25.5	16.0	9.3	301	
May 11, 2026	27	18	11	410	
July 9, 2026	28	19	12	436	
August 10, 2026	28	20	13	500	
Other forecasts Date	Forecast center	Period	Systems		Ref.
December 15, 2025	PAGASA	January–March	0–3 tropical cyclones		
December 15, 2025	PAGASA	April–June	2–5 tropical cyclones		
January 15, 2026	NCHMF	February–July	3-4 tropical cyclones		
January 15, 2026	NCHMF	August–December	9-10 tropical cyclones		
2026 season	Forecast Center	Tropical cyclones	Tropical storms	Typhoons	Ref.
Actual activity:	JMA	47	32	15	
Actual activity:	JTWC	32 (Note: This includes Nolo, which crossed from the Eastern Pacific to the Western Pacific basin.)	28	16	
Actual activity:	PAGASA	19	14	7	

Before and during the season, several national meteorological services and scientific agencies forecast the number of tropical cyclones, tropical storms, and typhoons that could form during the season and/or how many of them would affect a particular country. These agencies included the Tropical Storm Risk (TSR) Consortium of University College London, PAGASA, Vietnam's National Center for Hydro-Meteorological Forecasting (NCHMF) and Taiwan's Central Weather Administration (CWA).

The first outlook was released by PAGASA on December 15, 2025, in its monthly seasonal climate outlook, covering the first half of 2026. The agency forecast that zero to three tropical cyclones were expected to form or enter the PAR between January and March, while two to five were expected to form or enter the PAR between April and June. PAGASA also mentioned that the short-lived and weak La Niña, which began during the fourth quarter of 2025, would persist for a month or two, with a neutral El Niño–Southern Oscillation (ENSO) transition between January and March.

The year began with a weak La Niña cycle that developed in 2025. According to the National Oceanic and Atmospheric Administration's (NOAA) forecast, the ENSO state was likely to return to neutral by mid-year and potentially transition to an El Niño phase during the second half of the year.

== Systems ==
=== Tropical Storm Nokaen (Ada) ===
- Tropical storm (JMA)
- Tropical storm (SSHWS)
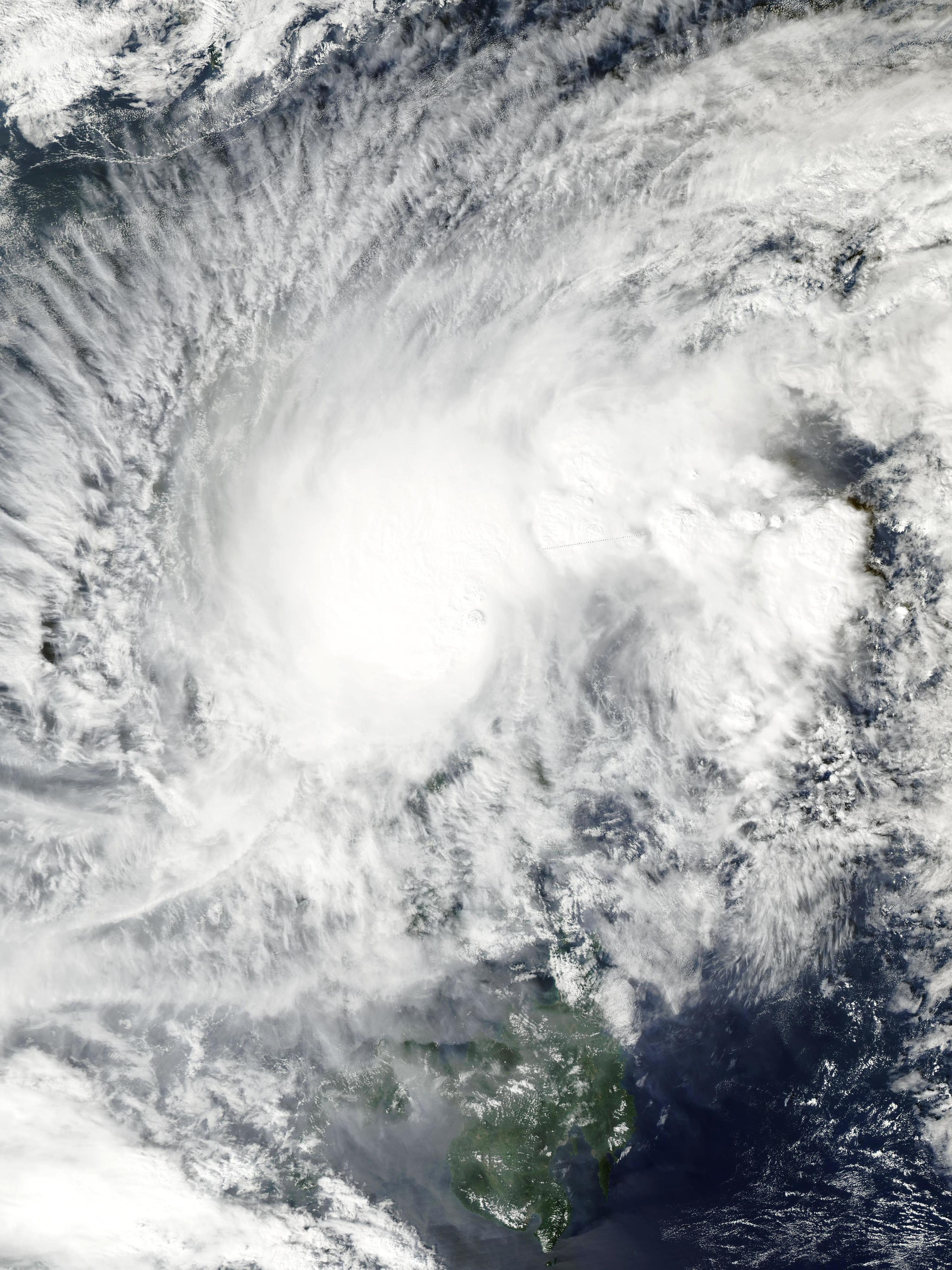
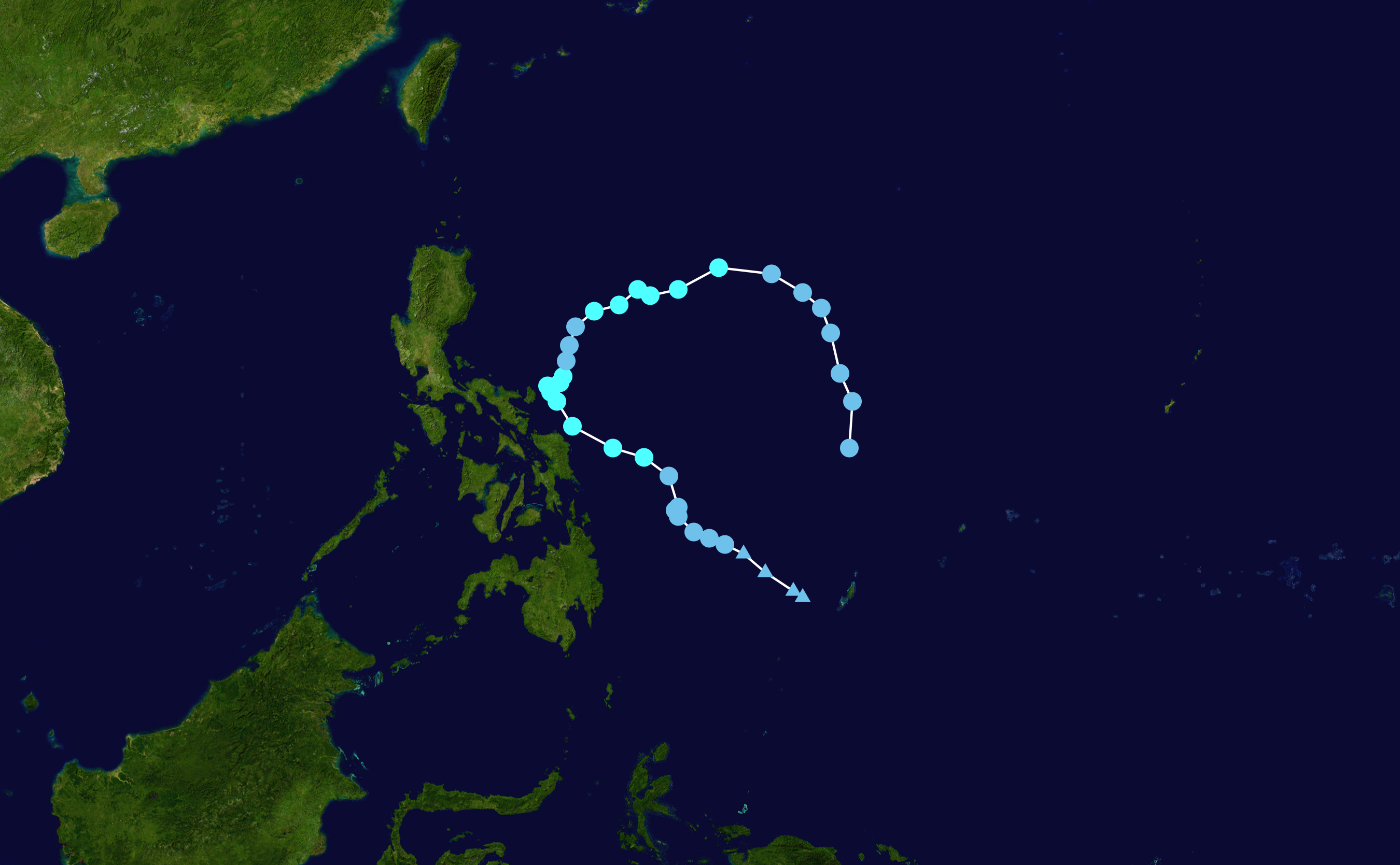
- Duration: January 13 – January 22
- Peak intensity: 75 km/h (45 mph) (10-min); 996 hPa (mbar)

On January 13, the JMA designated a tropical depression south of Palau. The following day, PAGASA classified the system, assigning it the name Ada, At 15:00 UTC, the JTWC upgraded the system to a tropical depression, designating it as 01W. At 06:00 UTC on January 15, the JMA upgraded the depression to Tropical Storm Nokaen. The storm moved to the northwest, remaining northeast of the Philippines, before the storm turned to the northeast. On January 19, Nokaen weakened into a tropical depression; the system further weakened into a remnant low on January 21 and dissipated on January 22.

Nokaen brought torrential rainfall to parts of the Philippines, triggering a landslide that resulted in two fatalities in Matnog, Sorsogon. Another fatality was reported after a maritime incident in the Surigao area. Several areas across Catanduanes, Albay, and Camarines Sur experienced flooding and landslides. A total of 832,986 people were affected, while 60,384 were displaced across Calabarzon, the Bicol Region, Eastern Visayas, Negros Island, and Caraga. The city government of Maasin, Southern Leyte postponed the "Sakay-Sakay Festival" to January 25. Additionally, a barangay in Oras, Eastern Samar experienced a water crisis after flooding damaged the village's water system.

=== Tropical Storm Penha (Basyang) ===
- Tropical storm (JMA)
- Tropical storm (SSHWS)
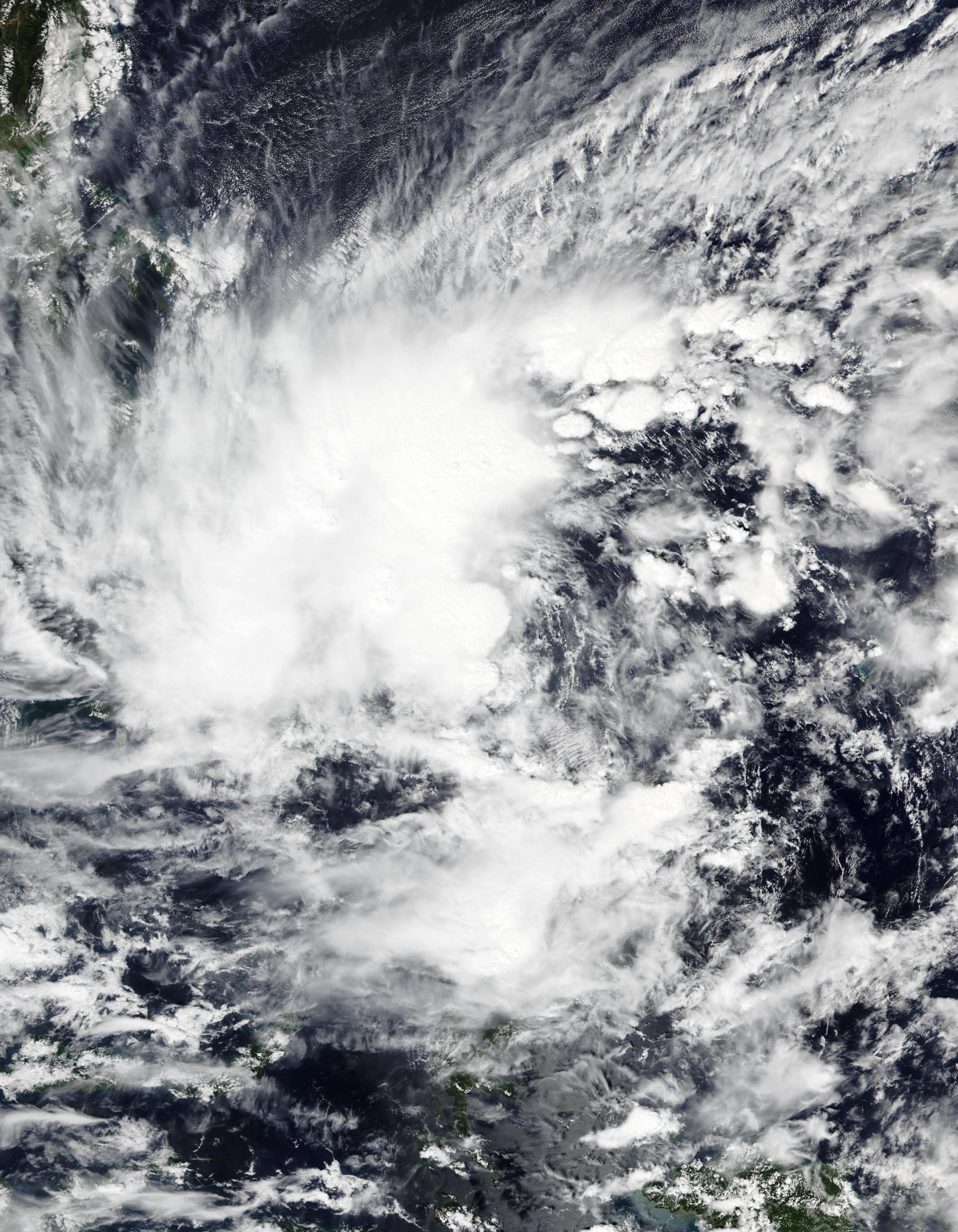
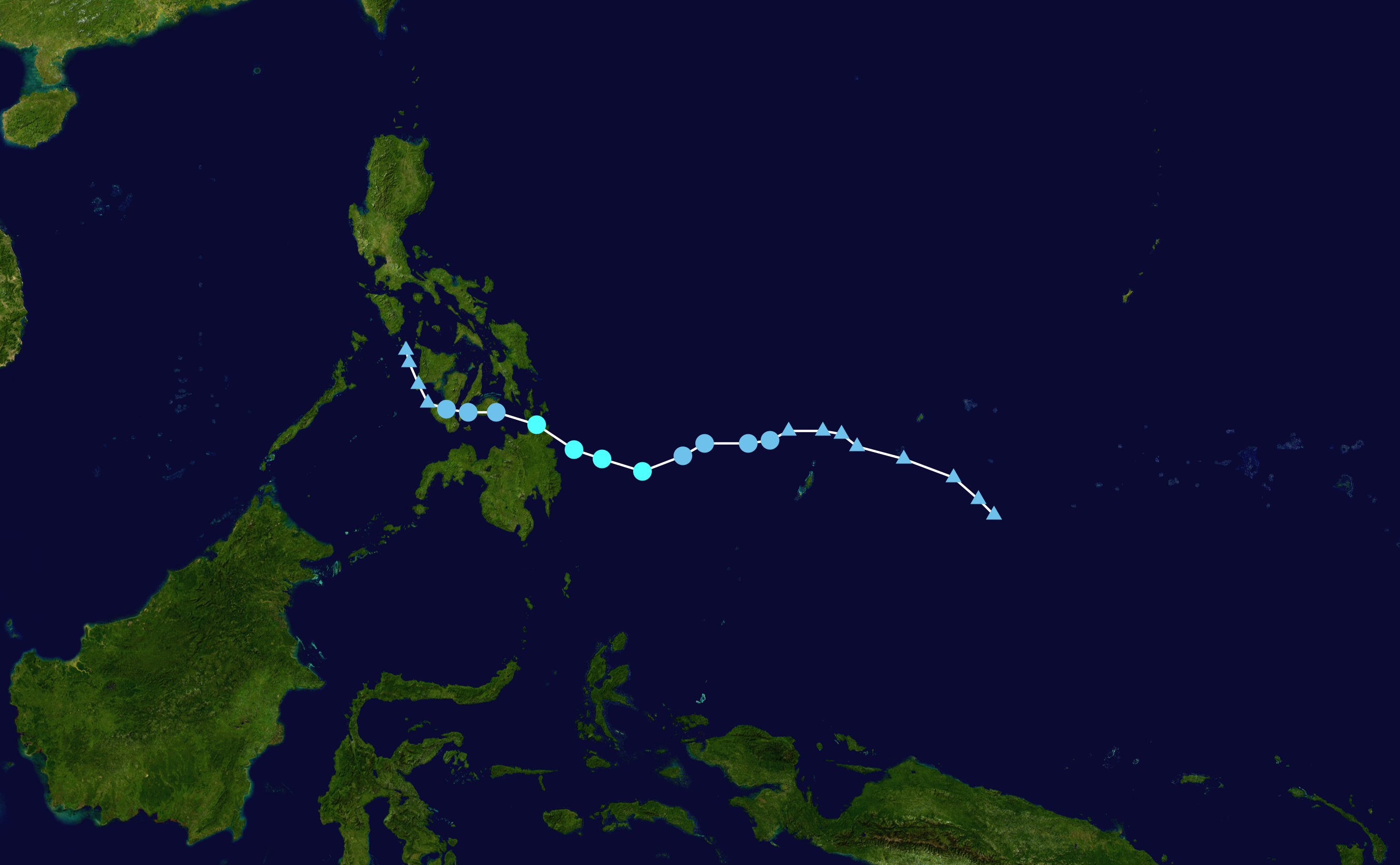
- Duration: February 3 – February 7
- Peak intensity: 65 km/h (40 mph) (10-min); 1002 hPa (mbar)

On February 2, the JTWC began tracking a low-pressure area that developed 128 nautical miles (237 km) east-northeast of Yap, with satellite imagery indicating a weak and broad low-level circulation center (LLCC). The JMA followed suit the next day, identifying the system as a tropical depression. On February 3, at 17:30 PHT (09:30 UTC), the system entered the PAR, with PAGASA assigning it the name Basyang. After the system organized further, the JTWC designating it as Tropical Depression 02W at 03:00 UTC on February 4. Later that day, at 21:00 JST (12:00 UTC), the JMA upgraded 02W to a tropical storm and assigned the name Penha. At 23:50 PHT (15:50 UTC), Penha made its first landfall over Bayabas, Surigao del Sur. This was followed by additional landfalls in Jagna and Dauis in Bohol, Alcoy, Cebu, and Ayungon, Negros Oriental on February 6. After making landfall, Penha weakened into a depression as it moved over cooler sea surface temperatures and encountered high wind shear. The system was downgraded to a remnant low the following day and dissipated a few hours later.

Penha produced heavy rainfall, flooding, and landslides across the Philippines, leaving 12 dead, 36 injured, and around 28,000 people displaced. A landslide claimed four lives in Cagayan de Oro, while five people died in Iligan. Two people drowned in Surigao del Sur, while another drowned in Carmen, Agusan del Norte. A state of calamity was subsequently declared in Iligan and Surigao del Sur, where damages reached ₱1.48 billion (US$25.24 million). A total of 1,373 houses were damaged.

=== Tropical Storm Nuri ===
- Tropical storm (JMA)
- Tropical depression (SSHWS)
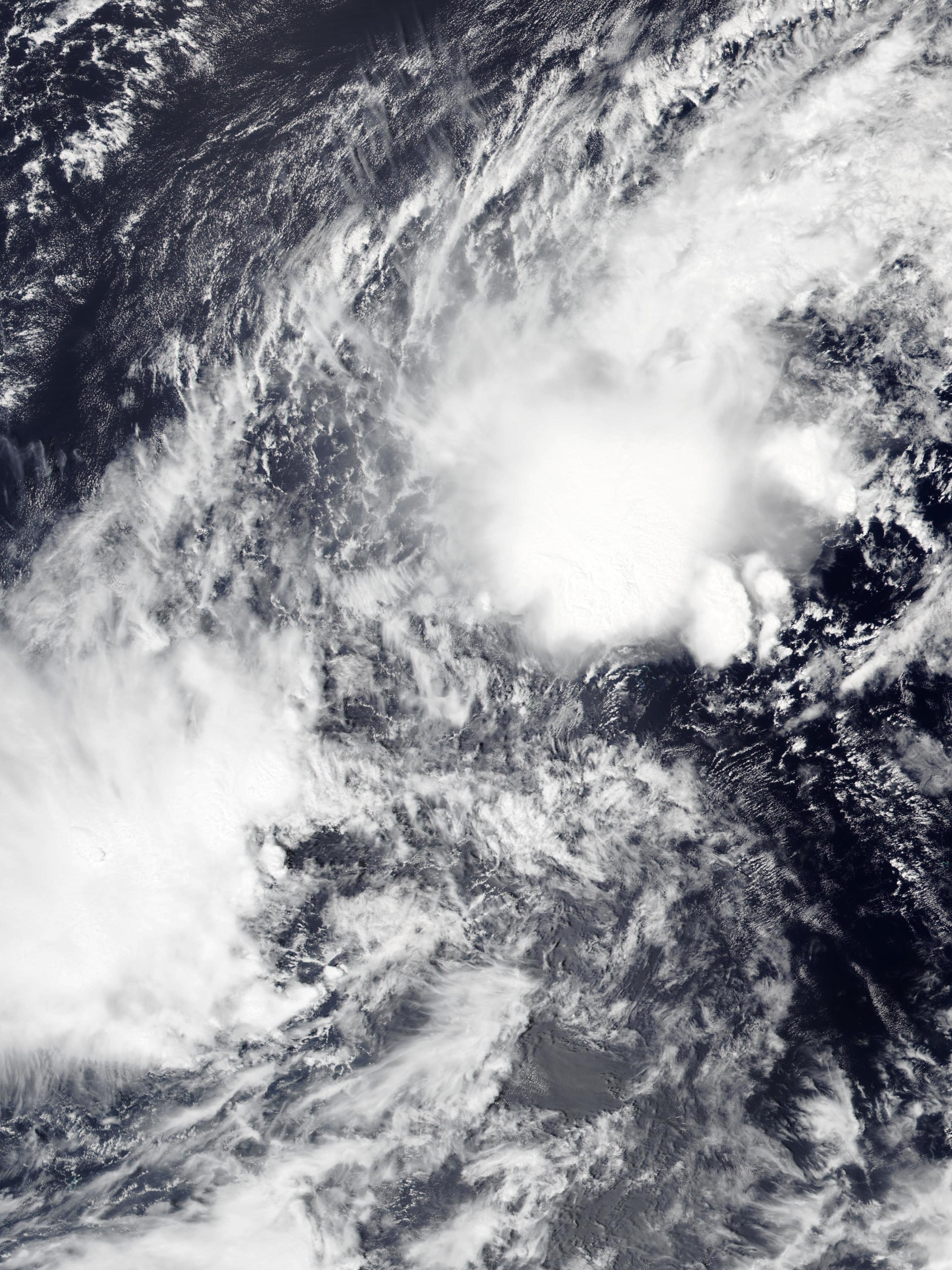
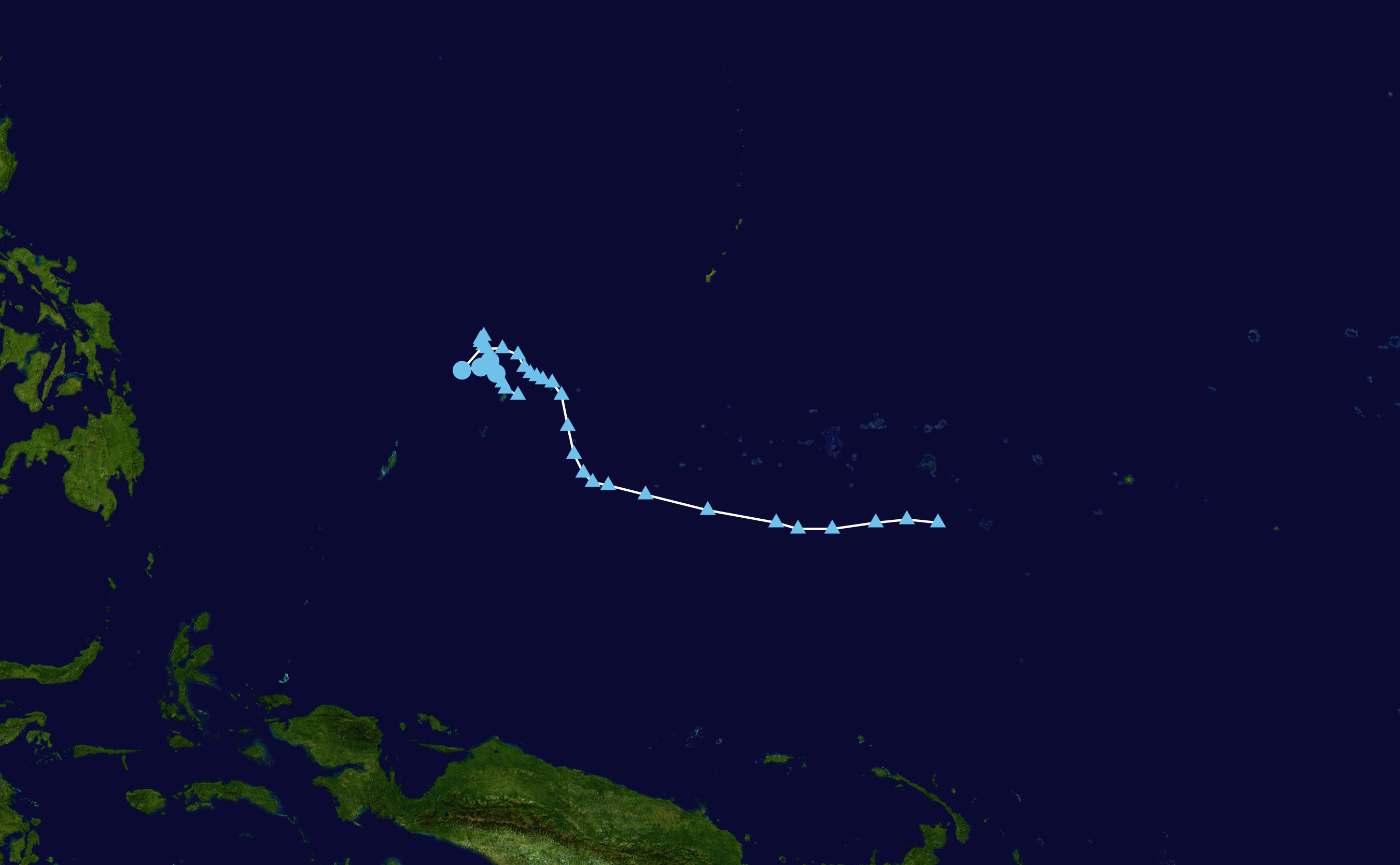
- Duration: March 10 – March 12
- Peak intensity: 65 km/h (40 mph) (10-min); 998 hPa (mbar)

On March 10, an area of low pressure formed 74 nautical miles (137 km) northeast of Yap, with the JTWC assessing a medium chance of tropical cyclone formation. The JMA also began issuing advisories on the system later that day, classifying it as a tropical depression. The system was in a marginally favorable environment as it tracked northeastward. On March 11, the JMA upgraded the system to a tropical storm and assigned it the name Nuri. The JTWC followed suit at 03:00 UTC, designating the system as Tropical Depression 03W. On March 12, Nuri weakened into a tropical depression and subsequently dissipated later that day, with both the JMA and JTWC issuing their final advisories on the system.

=== Typhoon Sinlaku ===
- Violent typhoon (JMA)
- Category 5 super typhoon (SSHWS)
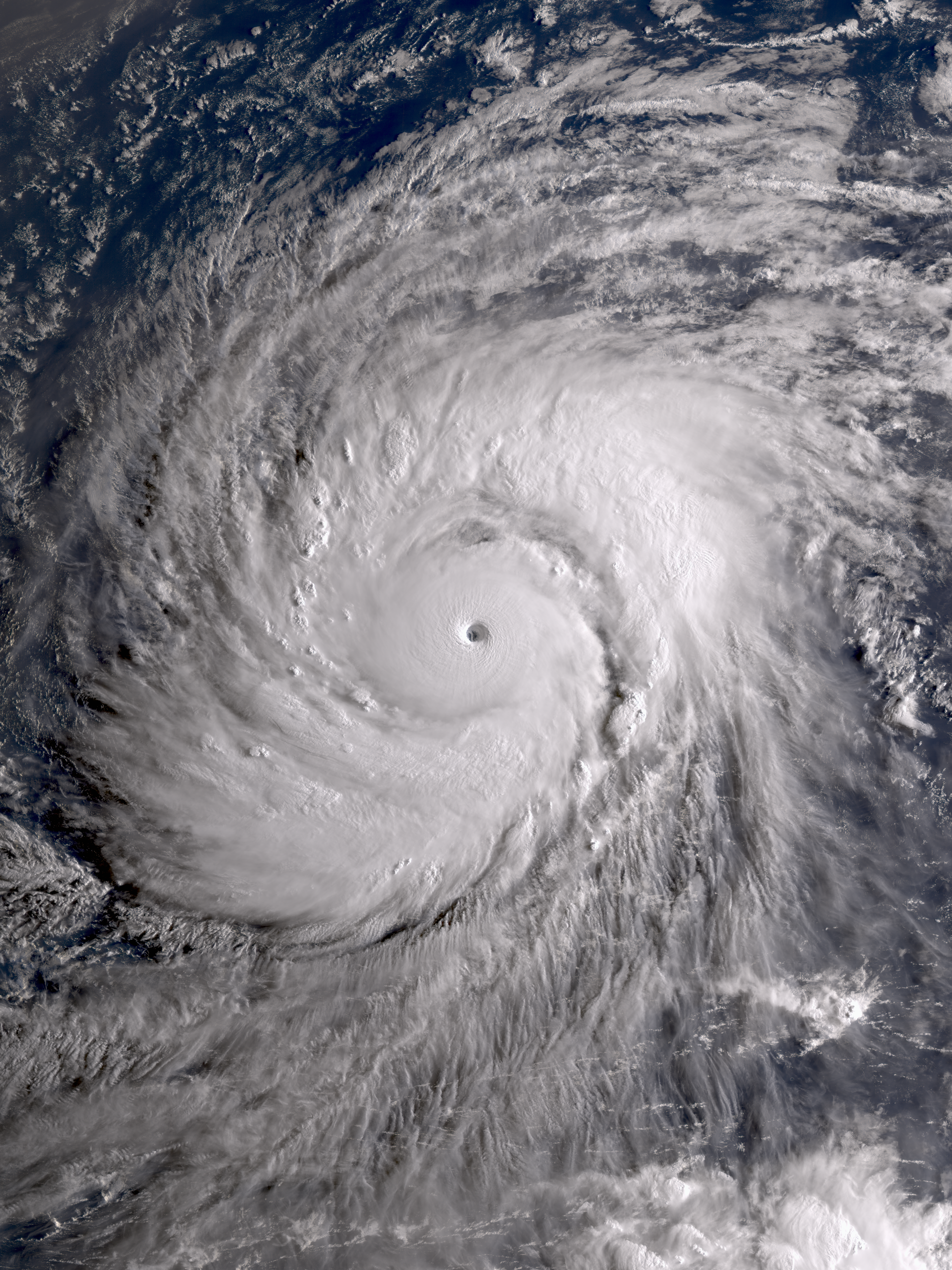
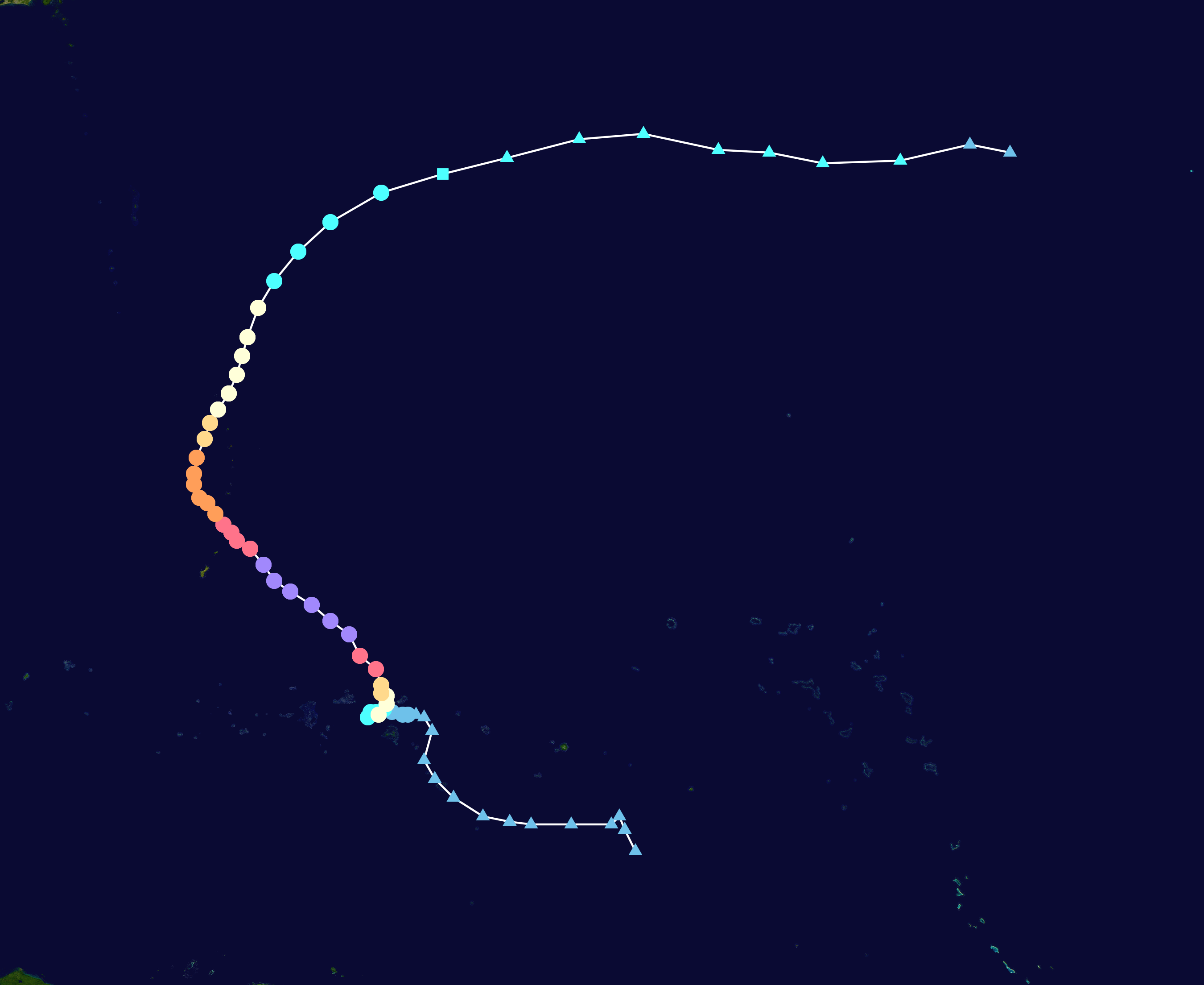
- Duration: April 7 – April 19
- Peak intensity: 215 km/h (130 mph) (10-min); 905 hPa (mbar)

On April 8, the Joint Typhoon Warning Center reported that an area of low pressure had formed 234 nautical miles (433 km) west-southwest of Chuuk, assessing a medium chance of development. The Japan Meteorological Agency later followed suit, classifying the system as a tropical depression. The low-level circulation center continued to wrap around the southern semicircle of the system. Early the following day, the JTWC upgraded the system into a depression and designated it Tropical Depression 04W. Later that day, the JMA upgraded 04W into a tropical storm, giving it the name Sinlaku as it moves westwards. With low vertical wind shear and high sea surface temperature, Sinlaku was upgraded to a severe tropical storm by the JMA at 12:00 UTC. On April 11, both the JMA and JTWC upgraded Sinlaku to a typhoon, with satellite imagery showing a rapidly consolidating storm and an expanding central dense overcast (CDO). The storm would begin rapidly intensifying, and the JMA upgraded Sinlaku to a violent typhoon the following day. By 18:00 UTC the same day, the JTWC upgraded Sinlaku's 1-minute sustained wind speeds to 160 knots (295 km/h) and lowered its pressure to 890 mb (26.28 inHg). By April 14, Sinlaku weakened to a Category 4-equivalent typhoon due to a long-lasting eyewall replacement cycle, losing super typhoon status. Later that day, the still very powerful typhoon made landfall on the northern side of Tinian, with Saipan being located within the now much larger new eye. By the next day, Sinlaku had completed its eyewall replacement cycle, having weakened to a Category 3-equivalent typhoon as it began to turn towards the north. Sinlaku further downgraded into a tropical storm on April 19 before it underwent extratropical transition on the following day, prompting the JTWC to issue its final warning at 21:00 UTC.

Sinlaku left one person dead and another missing in Micronesia. In the Northern Mariana Islands, six people went missing after a cargo vessel overturned.

=== Tropical Storm Hagupit (Caloy) ===
- Tropical storm (JMA)
- Tropical storm (SSHWS)
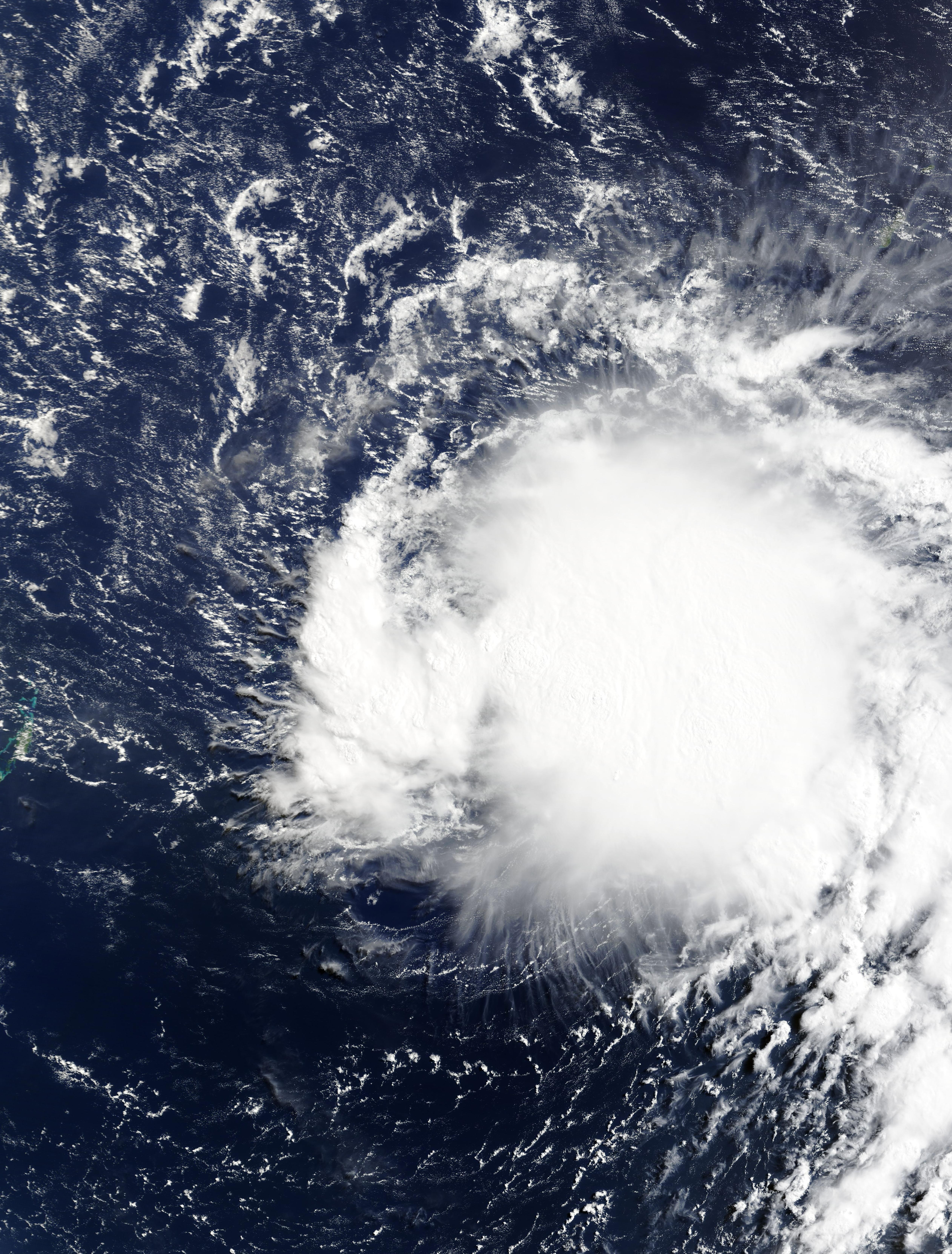
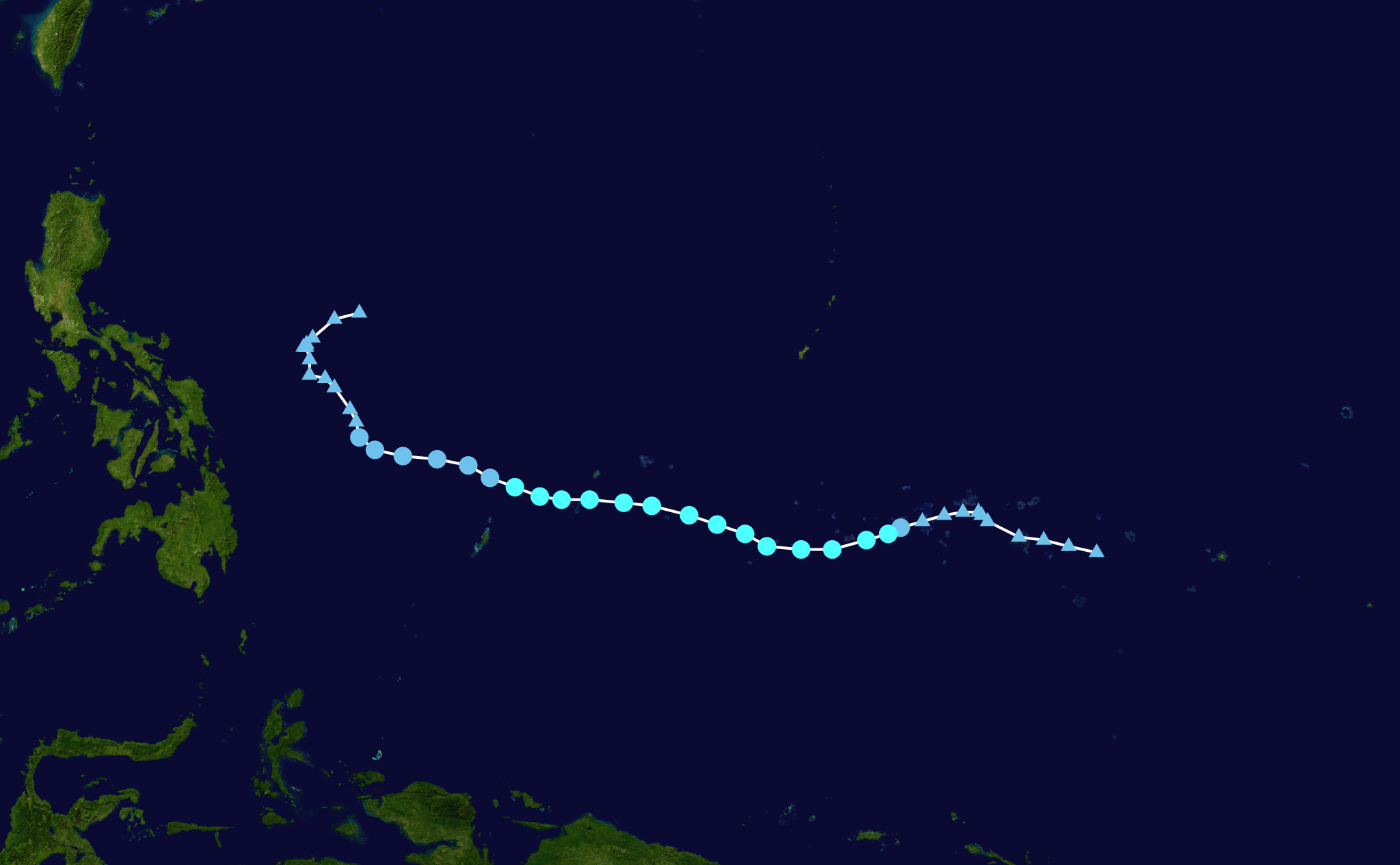
- Duration: May 4 – May 19
- Peak intensity: 65 km/h (40 mph) (10-min); 1002 hPa (mbar)

On May 4, JTWC marked an area of low-pressure 67 nautical miles (124 km) west-northwest of Chuuk, with a low chance of formation. The following day, deep convection built over the center, with formative banding. Later that day, at 21:00 UTC, the JTWC designated the system Tropical Depression 05W. The JTWC further upgraded the system to a tropical storm at 00:00 the following day. At 06:00 UTC, JMA followed suit and assigned the name Hagupit, as the storm passes through environmental conditions marginally favorable for development. At 18:00 UTC, a multispectral satellite imagery (MSI) showed that the storm had good cloud characteristics of anticyclonic outflow, while microwave imagery showed active, convective cloud clusters. On May 9, Hagupit entered the PAR at 18:00 PHT (10:00 UTC), and was assigned the name Caloy. At 03:00 UTC on May 10, Hagupit weakened into a tropical depression as it moves north-northwest over unfavorable conditions. The JTWC issued its final advisory on May 11 as Hagupit further weakened into a remnant low. JMA continued to track Hagupit as a depression before it was downgraded into a low-pressure area on May 15. The remnants of Hagupit tried to redevelop, with the JTWC analyzing the remnants as a separate entity, however they failed to redevelop and later dissipated.

=== Severe Tropical Storm Jangmi (Domeng) ===
- Severe tropical storm (JMA)
- Category 1 typhoon (SSHWS)
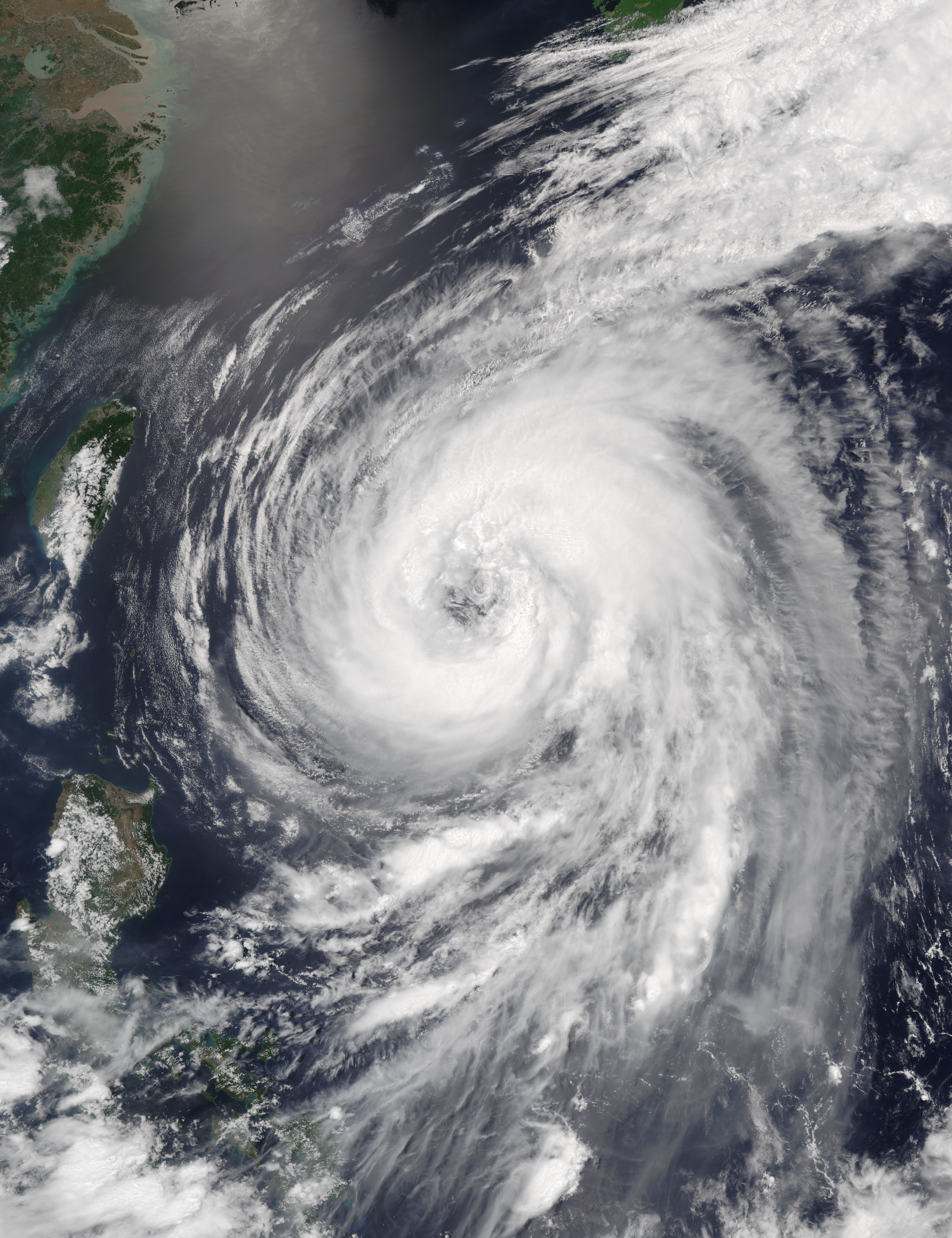
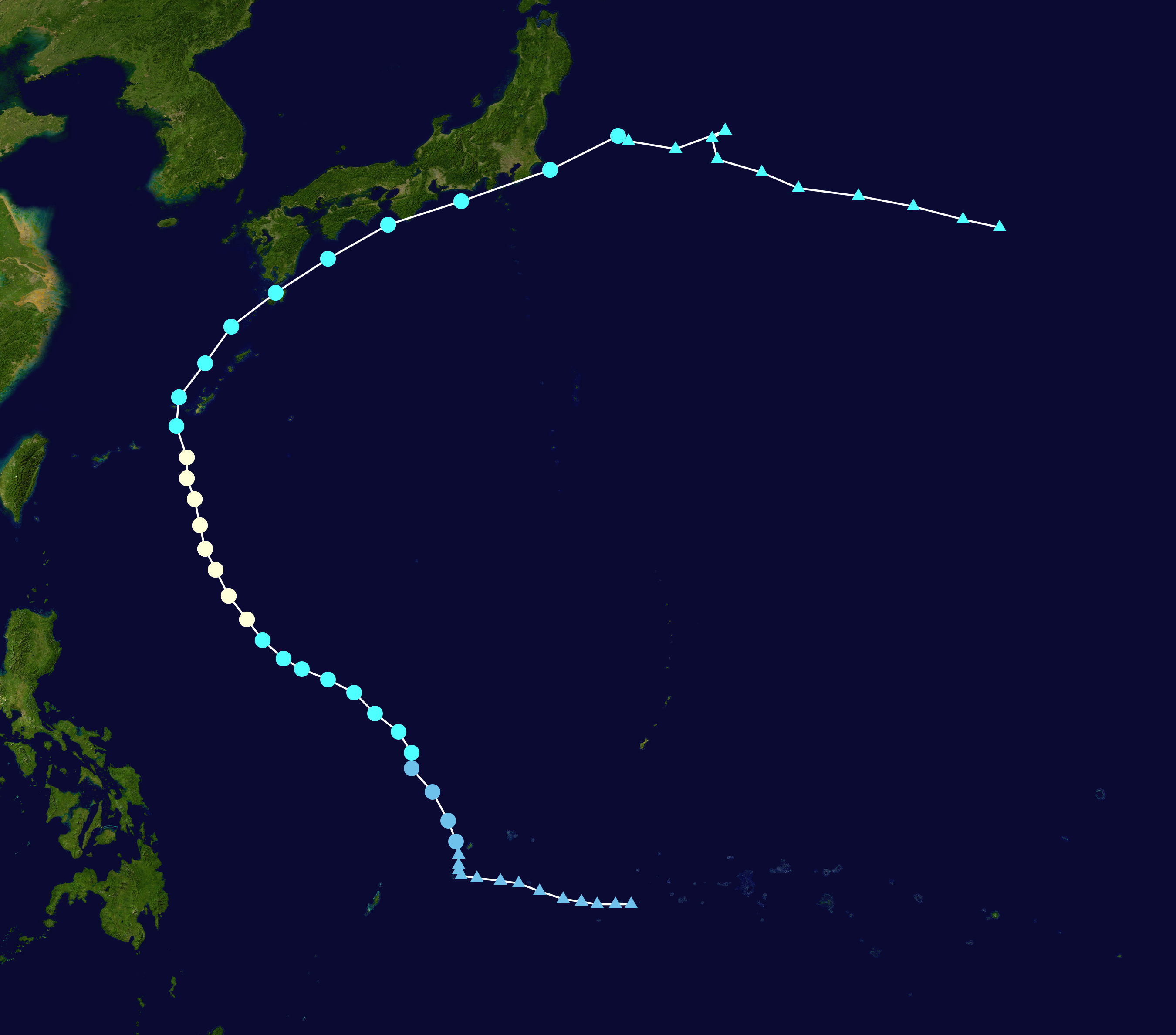
- Duration: May 26 – June 3
- Peak intensity: 110 km/h (70 mph) (10-min); 970 hPa (mbar)

On May 25, the JTWC began monitoring a disturbance east-southeast of Yap, noting favorable conditions for tropical cyclogenesis. Development chances were raised to medium on May 26, and the Japan Meteorological Agency (JMA) classified it as a tropical depression later that day. On May 27, the JMA upgraded the system to Tropical Storm Jangmi, while the JTWC designated it as 06W. After entering the PAR on May 29, PAGASA assigned the name Domeng. Jangmi intensified into a Category 1-equivalent typhoon on May 30 by the JTWC, with the JMA upgrading it to a severe tropical storm. It weakened to a tropical storm on June 1 due to a deteriorating structure and dry air intrusion. Jangmi made landfall in Wakayama Prefecture on June 3 before becoming extratropical later that day.

According to the National Disaster Risk Reduction and Management Council (NDRRMC), 85,295 people were displaced in the Bangsamoro Autonomous Region of Muslim Mindanao (BARMM), where infrastructure damage reached ₱3.4 million (US$55,055.42). In Japan, a total of 23 injuries were reported, including 17 in Okinawa and two in Kagoshima Prefecture; 48 houses were also partially damaged in Kagoshima. Flooding occurred in Saiwai-ku, Kawasaki and Ōta, Tokyo, while part of National Route 371 collapsed. Water outages affected 1,800 households in Ōme, Tokyo, and fallen branches disrupted the Hachikō Line between Haijima and Komagawa.

=== Typhoon Mekkhala (Francisco) ===
- Very strong typhoon (JMA)
- Category 4 typhoon (SSHWS)
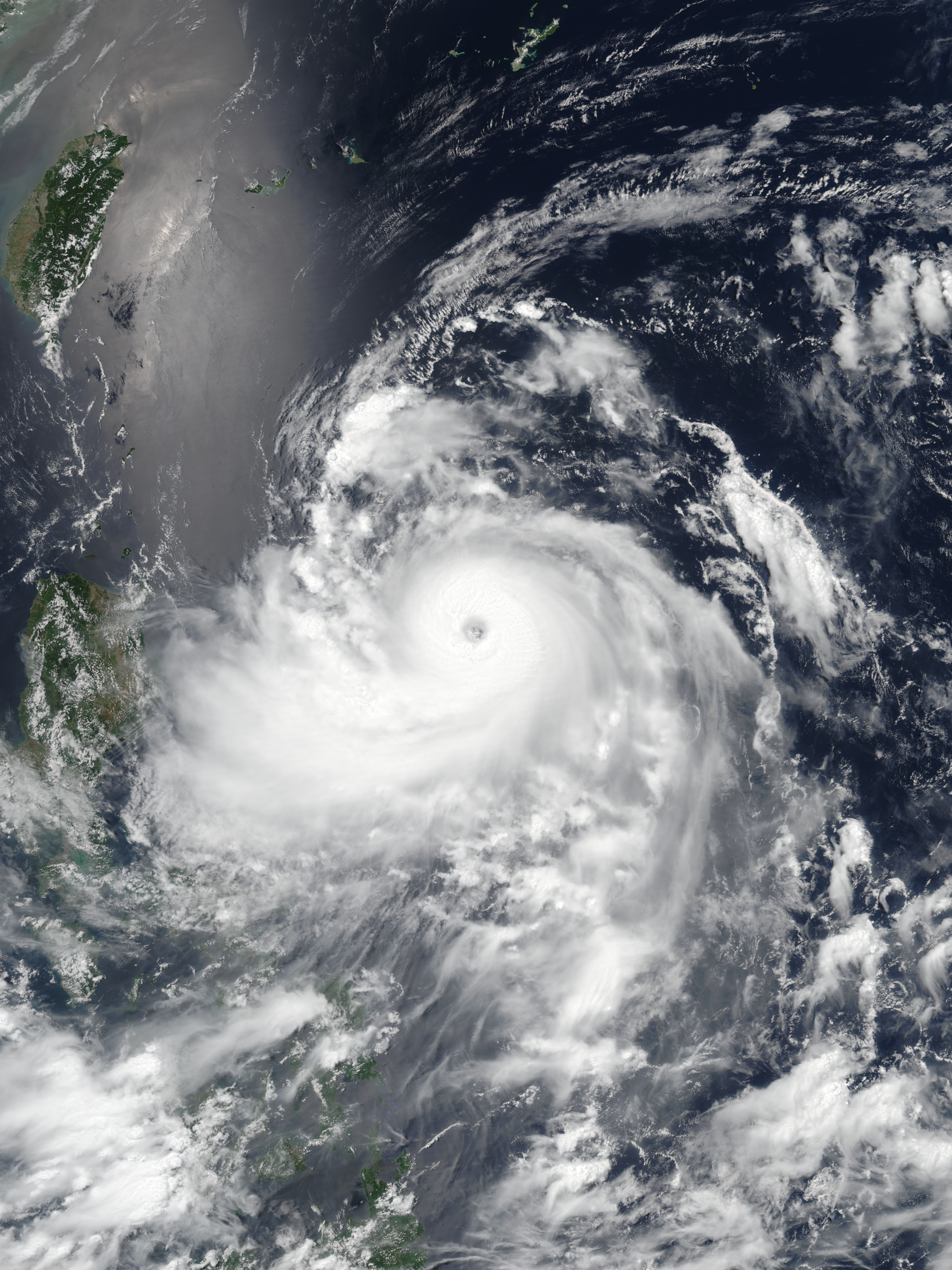
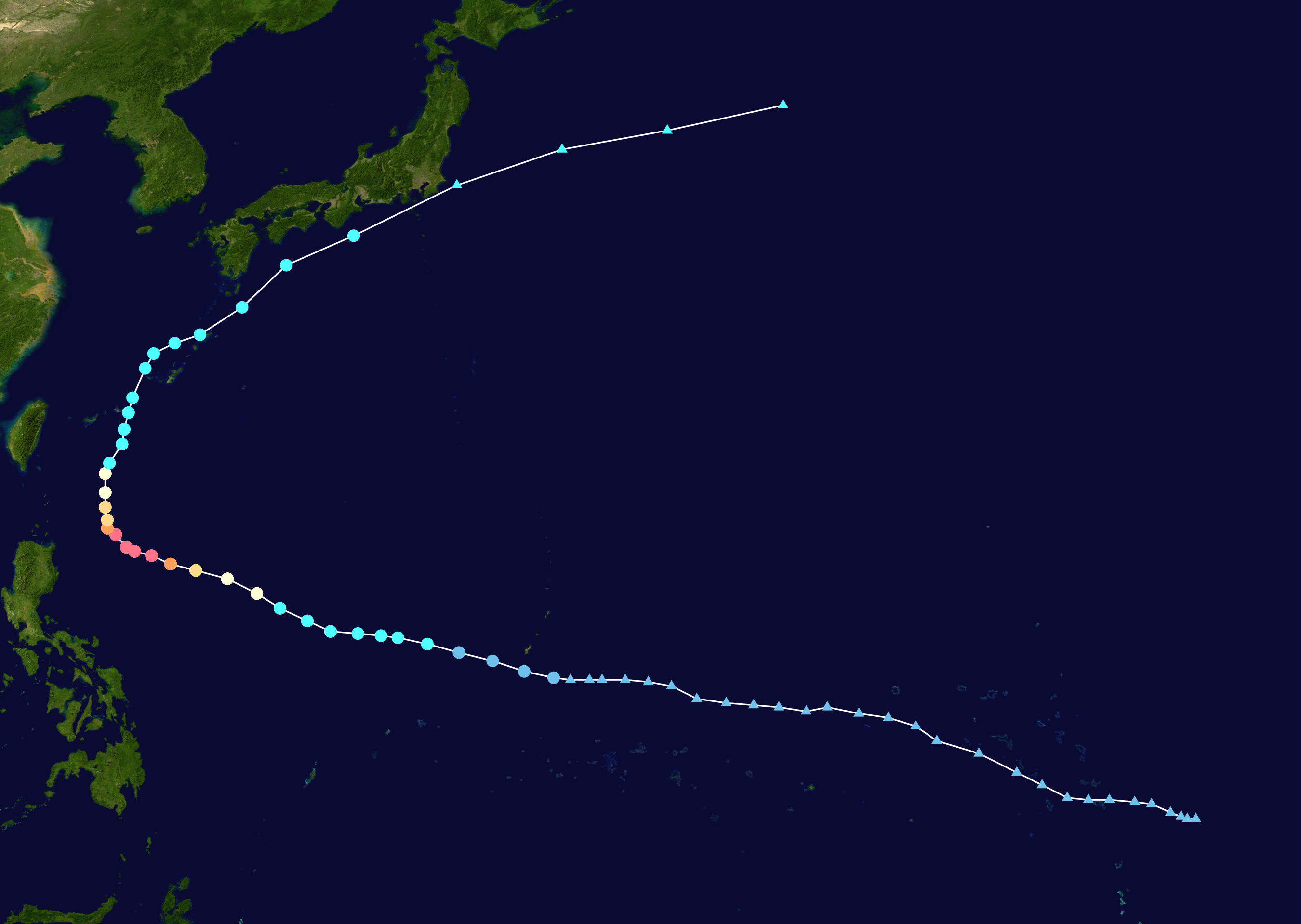
- Duration: June 18 – June 27
- Peak intensity: 185 km/h (115 mph) (10-min); 925 hPa (mbar)

On June 15, the JTWC began monitoring a disorganized low-pressure area 940 nautical miles (1,740 km) east-southeast of Guam in a marginal environment for tropical cyclogenesis. On June 18, the JMA classified the system as a tropical depression. Later that day, the JTWC designated it as Tropical Depression 07W. On June 19, the JMA upgraded the system to Tropical Storm Mekkhala, with a persistent CDO partially obscuring its LLCC. Mekkhala entered the PAR on June 20 and was named Francisco by PAGASA. It strengthened into a severe tropical storm before becoming a Category 1-equivalent typhoon on June 21. The storm intensified into a Category 2-equivalent typhoon, with PAGASA also upgrading it to typhoon status. On June 22, Mekkhala strengthened into a Category 3-equivalent typhoon before peaking as a Category 4-equivalent typhoon, while PAGASA classified it as a super typhoon. The storm weakened on June 23 as it encountered cooler waters and 20 to 25 knots (37 to 46 km/h; 23 to 29 mph) north-northeasterly wind shear. By June 25, Mekkhala had weakened to a tropical storm, with the JMA downgrading it to a severe tropical storm as it exited the PAR. Storm warnings were issued for Okinawa as the system approached the islands. Mekkhala later scraped the coast of Japan before becoming extratropical on June 27, prompting the JTWC to discontinue advisories.

Two people died in Taiwan, one in Kaohsiung and another in Hsinchu County. One other person in Hsinchu County went missing. In Japan, the storm produced heavy rainfall which overflowed a reservoir in Hiroshima Prefecture and impacted several residences. Two people were killed and another was injured due to a paddling incident related to the storm in Ehime Prefecture while a landslide caused another death in Yamaguchi Prefecture. Four other injuries occurred across Japan.

=== Severe Tropical Storm Higos (Gardo) ===
- Severe tropical storm (JMA)
- Tropical storm (SSHWS)
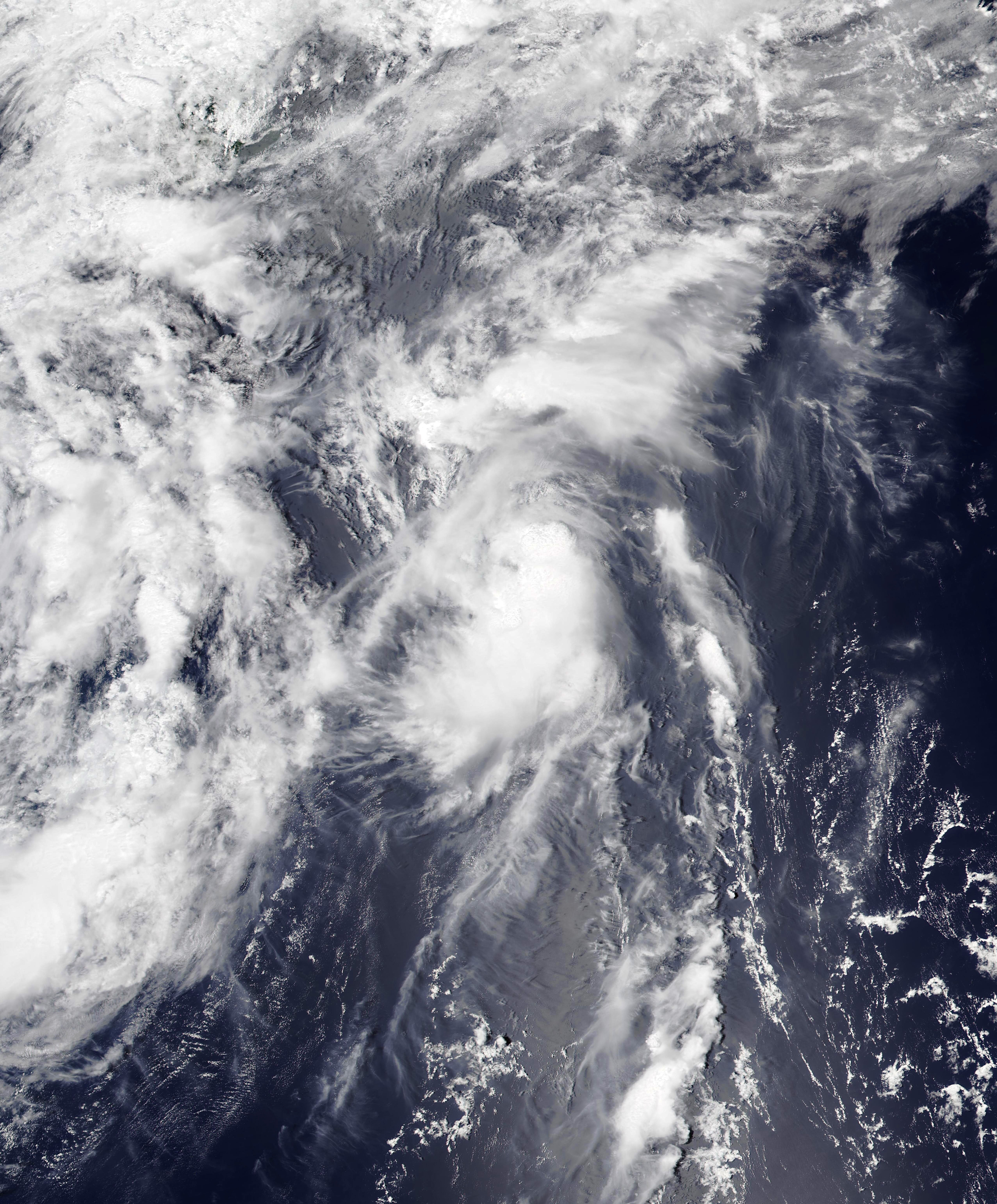
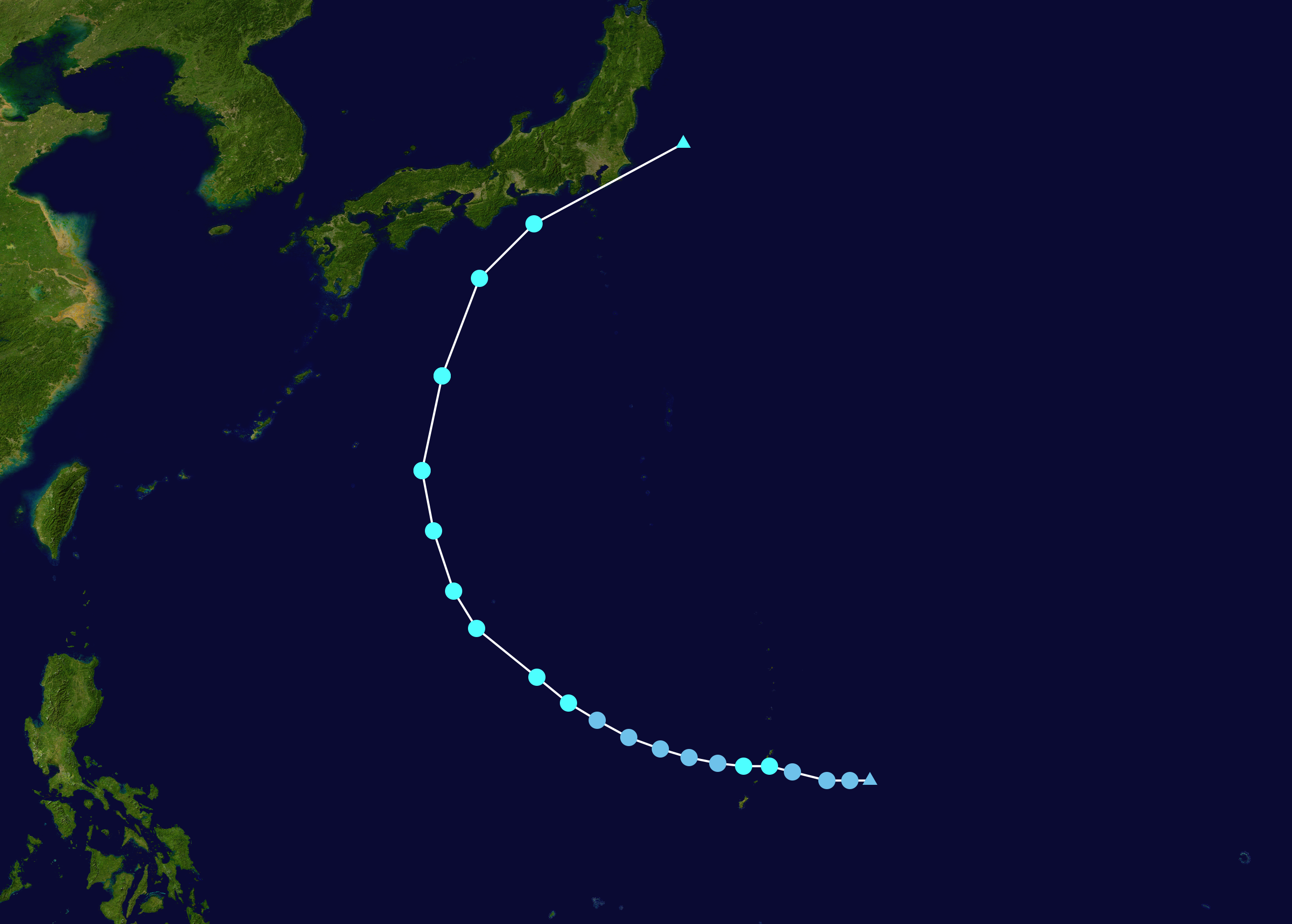
- Duration: June 21 – June 26
- Peak intensity: 95 km/h (60 mph) (10-min); 996 hPa (mbar)

On June 21, the JTWC marked a poorly organized but consolidating low-pressure area that formed 441 nm (817 km) east of Guam. Although expecting a slow development, the disturbance was located in a favorable environment for tropical cyclogenesis. On the following day, the JMA started issuing advisories on the system, recognizing it as a tropical depression. The circulation consolidated, with persistent deep convection around the center. JTWC later designated the disturbance as 08W at 15:00 UTC. At 00:00 UTC of June 23, 08W was upgraded into a tropical storm, receiving the name Higos by the JMA. On June 23, Higos weakened back to a tropical depression with winds of 35 mph and a central pressure of 1003 hPa (mbar). However, Higos regained tropical storm status at 21:00 UTC of June 24. At 15:00 PHT (07:00 UTC) of the following day, Higos entered the PAR, assigning the domestic name Gardo by PAGASA, with the system moving towards the north when it entered. The system then exited the PAR at 09:30 PHT (01:30 UTC). Then, Higos made a big turn towards the north and then to the northeast. On June 27 at 5:25 AM JST (19:25 UTC on June 26), Higos made landfall on the Izu Peninsula as it raced towards the northeast, subsequently making landfall on the Boso Peninsula an hour later. Later that evening, Higos completed its extratropical transition, and shortly after, it was absorbed into another extratropical cyclone system to the north.

=== Typhoon Bavi (Inday) ===
- Violent typhoon (JMA)
- Category 5 super typhoon (SSHWS)
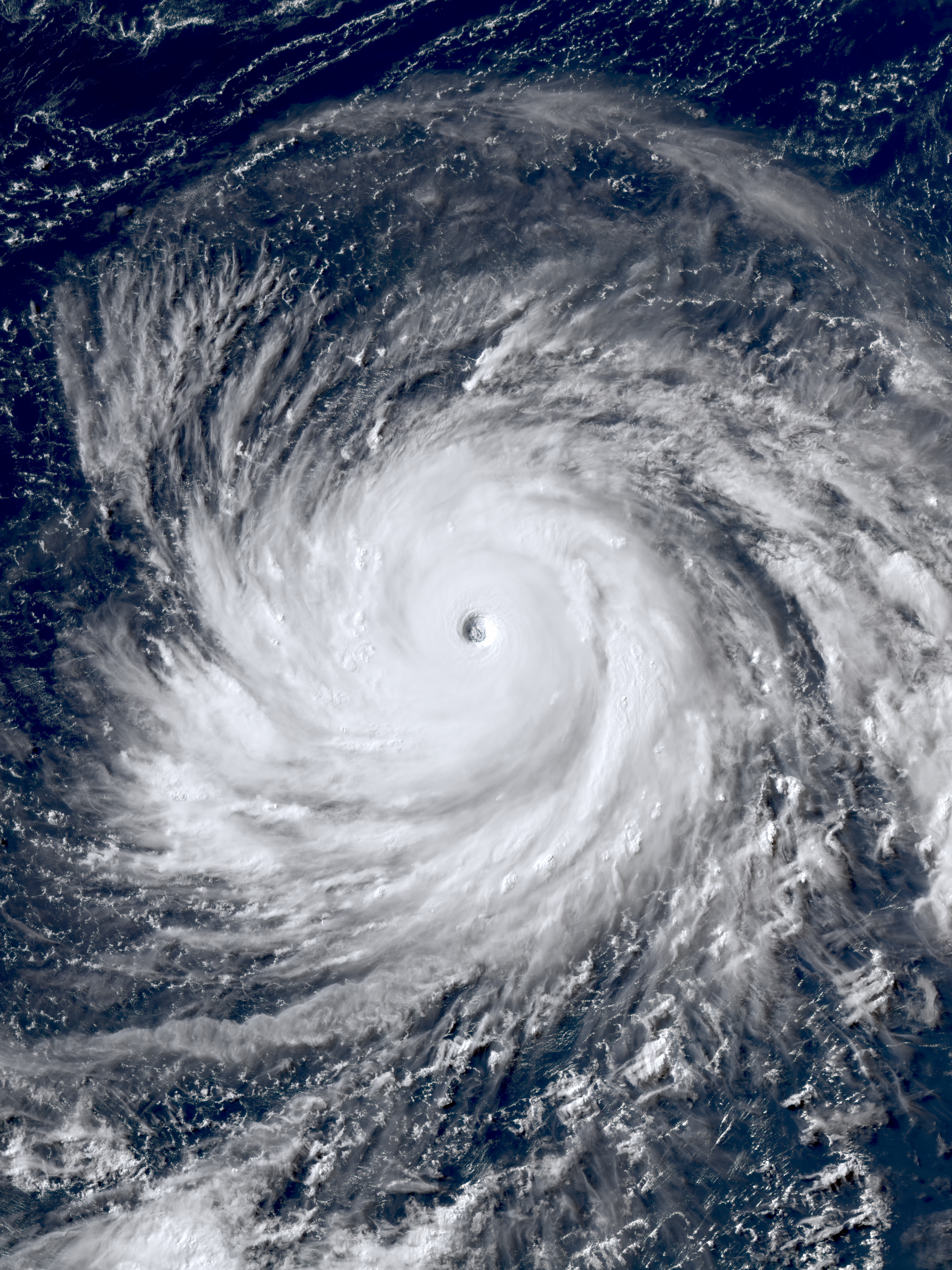
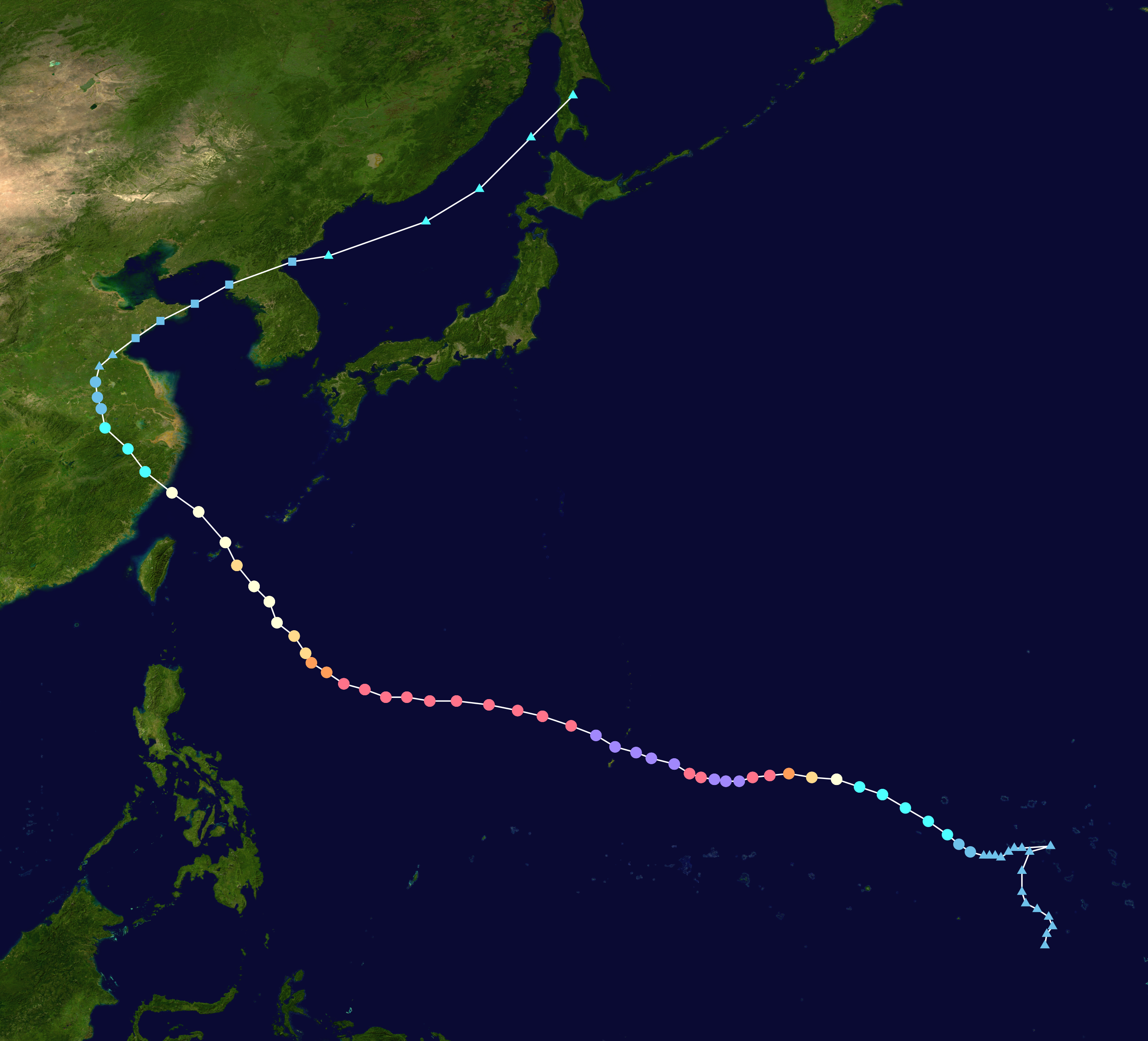
- Duration: June 30 – July 15
- Peak intensity: 215 km/h (130 mph) (10-min); 900 hPa (mbar)

On June 25, the JTWC began monitoring a low-pressure area 901 nm (1,669 km) east-southeast of Kwajalein, noting favorable conditions for tropical cyclogenesis. Early on July 1, the JTWC classified it as Tropical Depression 09W. The JMA upgraded it to Tropical Storm Bavi on July 2. Bavi then underwent rapid intensification, strengthening from 70 kn (80 mph; 130 km/h) to 125 kn (145 mph; 230 km/h) in 18 hours, becoming a Category 4-equivalent typhoon with a well-defined eye. On July 4, the JTWC upgraded Bavi to a Category 5 super typhoon, while the JMA classified it as a violent typhoon. After briefly weakening due to an eyewall replacement cycle, Bavi regained Category 5-equivalent intensity before making landfall on Rota on July 6 as one of the island's strongest typhoons. On July 7, PAGASA assigned the local name Inday while the storm remained outside the PAR. Bavi turned northwest on July 9 and weakened due to another eyewall replacement cycle. It reintensified on July 11 before making landfall in Zhejiang at 23:20 CST (15:20 UTC) on July 12 with 125 km/h (77 mph) sustained winds.

Bavi triggered heavy rains and landslides that killed 23 people and left 18 others missing across the Philippines.

=== Severe Tropical Storm Maysak (Henry) ===
- Severe tropical storm (JMA)
- Tropical storm (SSHWS)
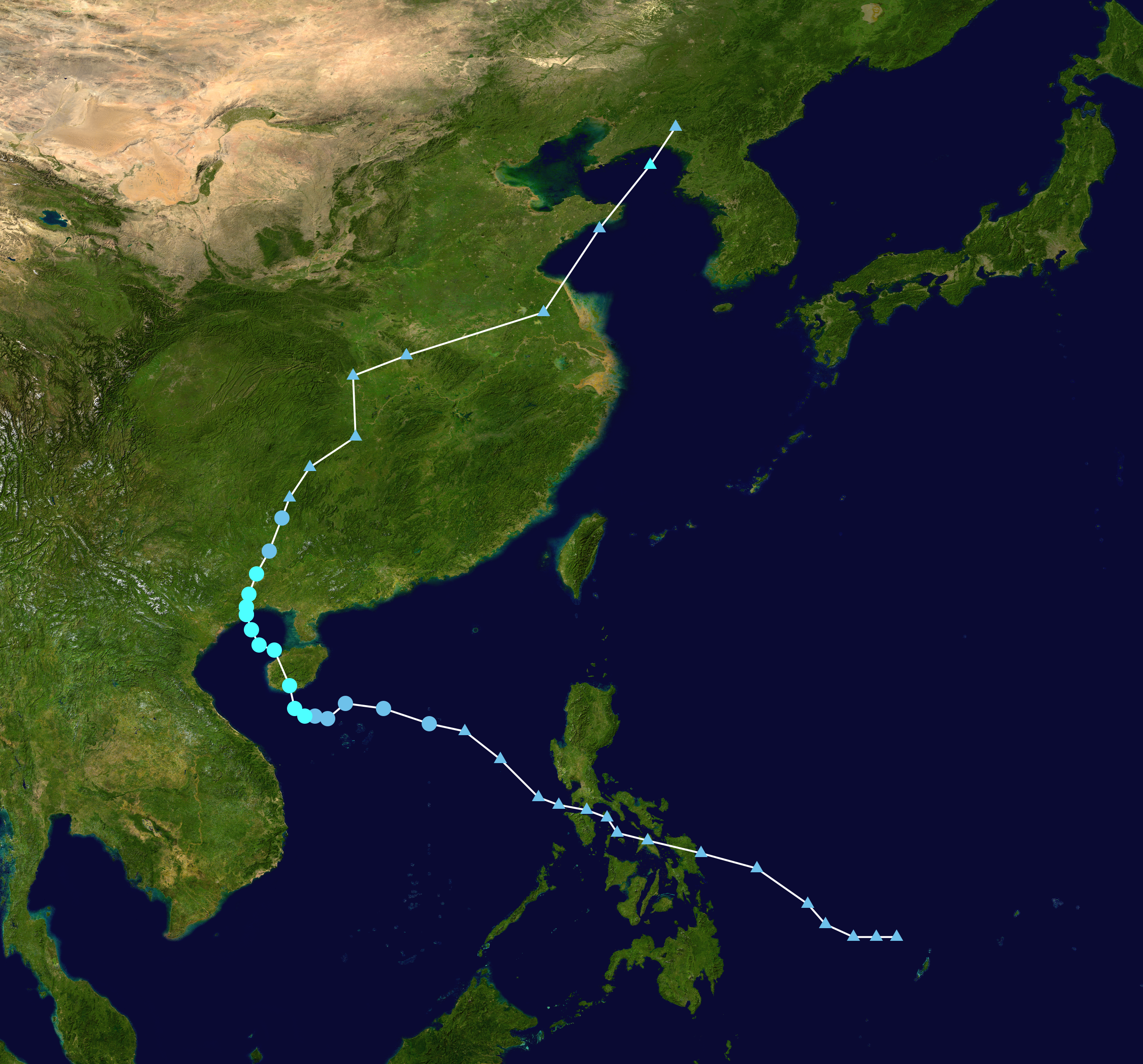
- Duration: June 30 – July 7
- Peak intensity: 95 km/h (60 mph) (10-min); 985 hPa (mbar)

On June 29, an area of convection had developed 591 nm (1,095 km) of Manila, with satellite imagery indicating an elongated LLCC with disorganized convection throughout the northern periphery. At 02:00 UTC of July 1 (18:00 UTC of June 30), PAGASA upgraded the disturbance into a tropical depression, assigning the local name Henry. On July 1, Henry was designated as 10W by the JTWC as the agency followed suit. As Henry tracked northwards, JMA upgraded it into a tropical storm at 18:00 UTC of the following day, which gained the name Maysak. On July 3 at 10:20 UTC, Maysak made its first landfall near Lingshui, Hainan Province. As Maysak moved through the Gulf of Tonkin, JMA upgraded it into a severe tropical storm before the system made its second and final landfall in Móng Cái, Quảng Ninh province on July 4 at 12:30 UTC. Maysak later moved inland, causing the JMA to downgrade it to a tropical depression.

In Vietnam, strong winds from Maysak uprooted trees and ripped metal roofs off buildings in Móng Cái. Up to 13 in (33 cm) of rainfall was recorded in Fushun on July 4, flooding streets and forcing 3,600 people to evacuate. In Guangxi, China, severe flooding and strong winds killed two people in Nanning, submerged cars and trapped people in Fangchenggang and uprooted trees in Dongxing.

=== Tropical Storm Haishen (Josie) ===
- Tropical storm (JMA)
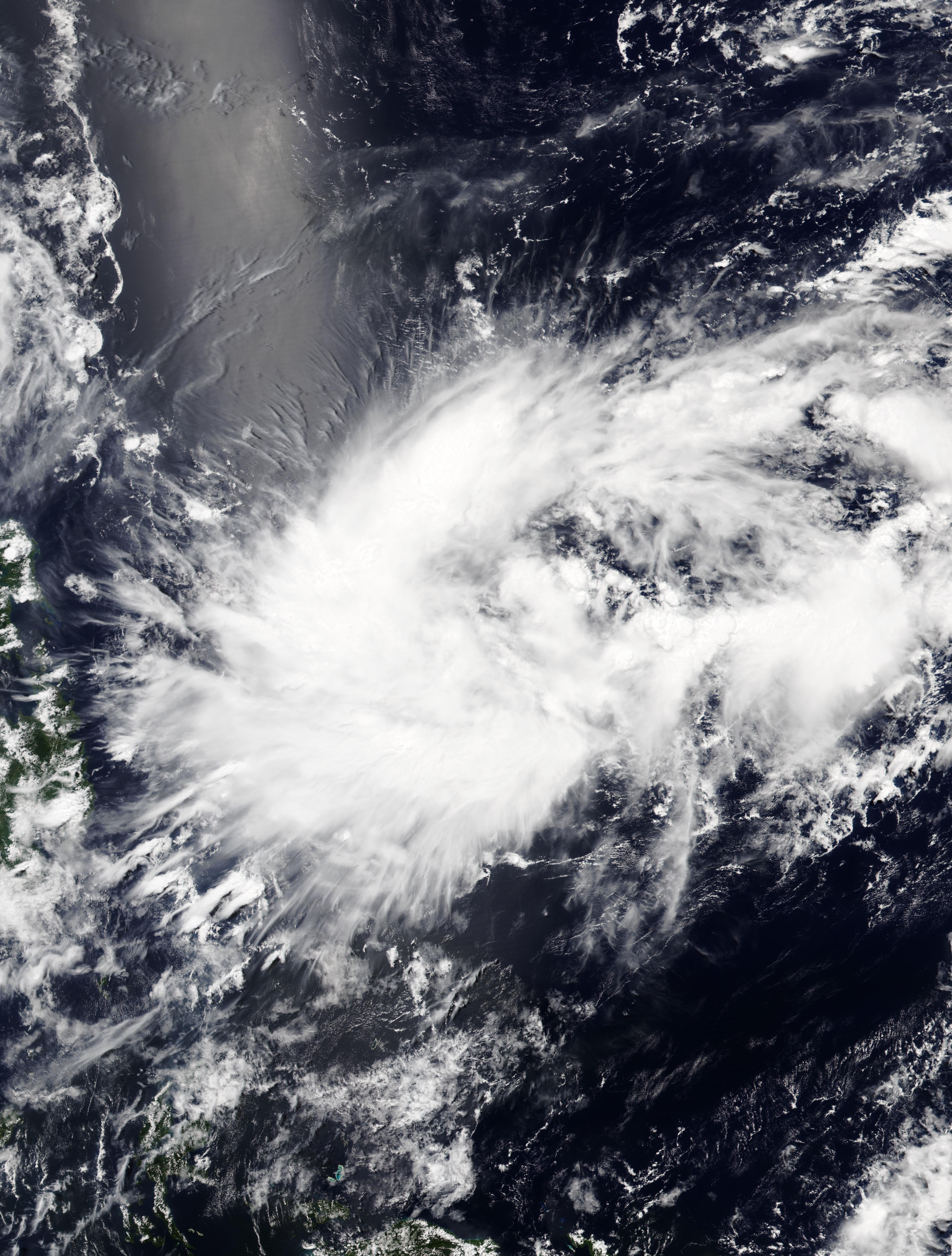
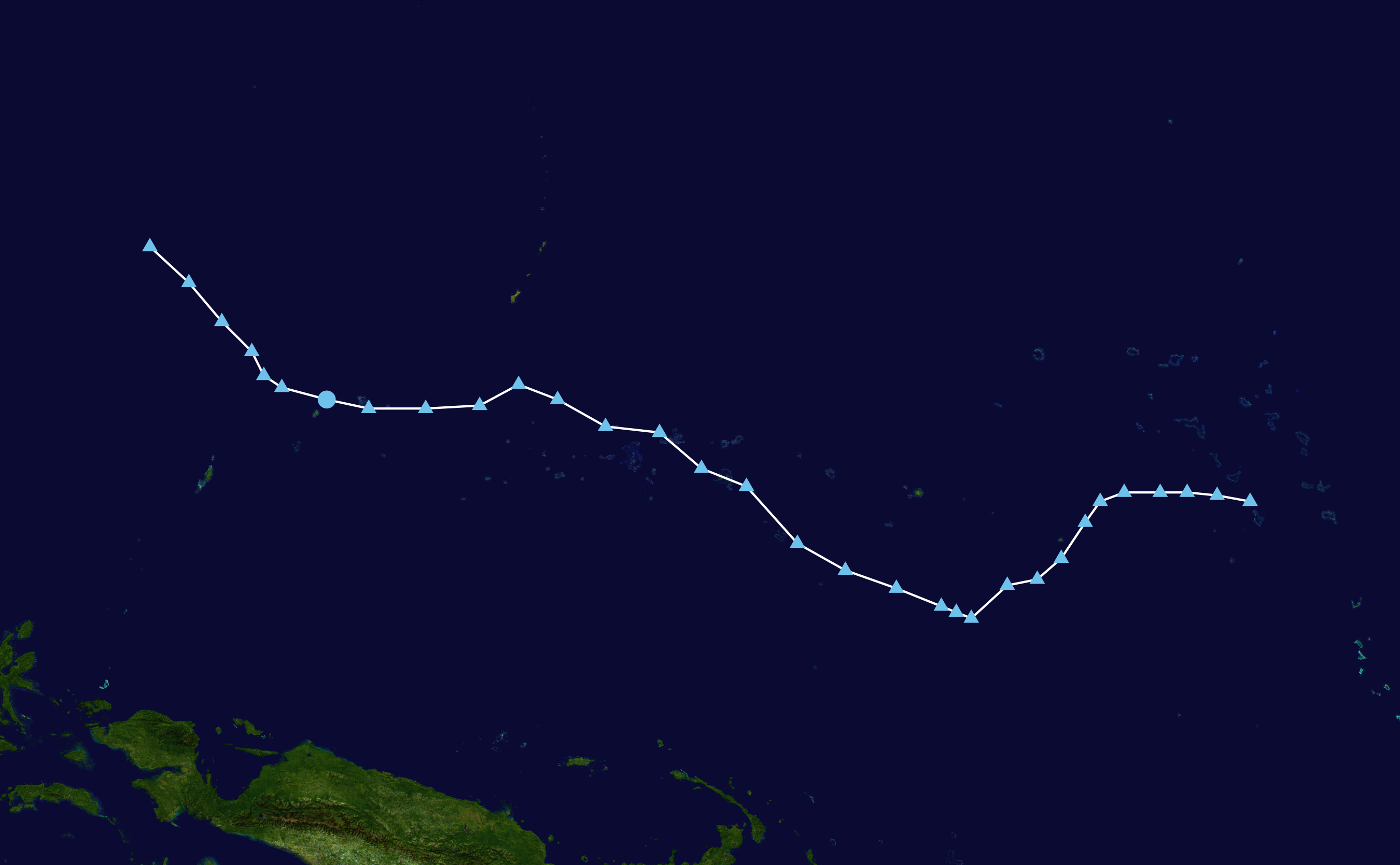
- Duration: July 12 – July 13
- Peak intensity: 65 km/h (40 mph) (10-min); 1004 hPa (mbar)

On July 7, the JTWC began tracking a disturbance situated over the Marshall Islands. Over the next several days, the disturbance drifted towards the southeast before heading northeastward. On July 12, the disturbance became better organized, prompting the JMA to classify the system as a tropical depression. The following day, it further intensified into a tropical storm, giving it name Haishen by the JMA at 00:00 UTC, with the JTWC issuing a Tropical Cyclone Formation Alert for the system at 03:00 UTC. PAGASA also issued a tropical cyclone advisory the same day at 11:00 PHT (03:00 UTC). At 00:30 PHT (16:30 UTC), Haishen entered the PAR, subsequently assigning the local name Josie by PAGASA. However, the following day, at 03:30 UTC, the JTWC cancelled its TCFA as Haishen dissipated due to moderate to strong easterly wind shear, without giving the system a formal designation. Meanwhile, the JMA continued monitoring Haishen, downgrading into a tropical depression at 00:00 UTC until further downgrading into a low-pressure area at 12:00 UTC.

Haishen is the first tropical storm to be recognized by the Japan Meteorological Agency, but not by the Joint Typhoon Warning Center since Mulan in 2022.

=== Typhoon Noul (Kiyapo) ===
- Typhoon (JMA)
- Category 2 typhoon (SSHWS)
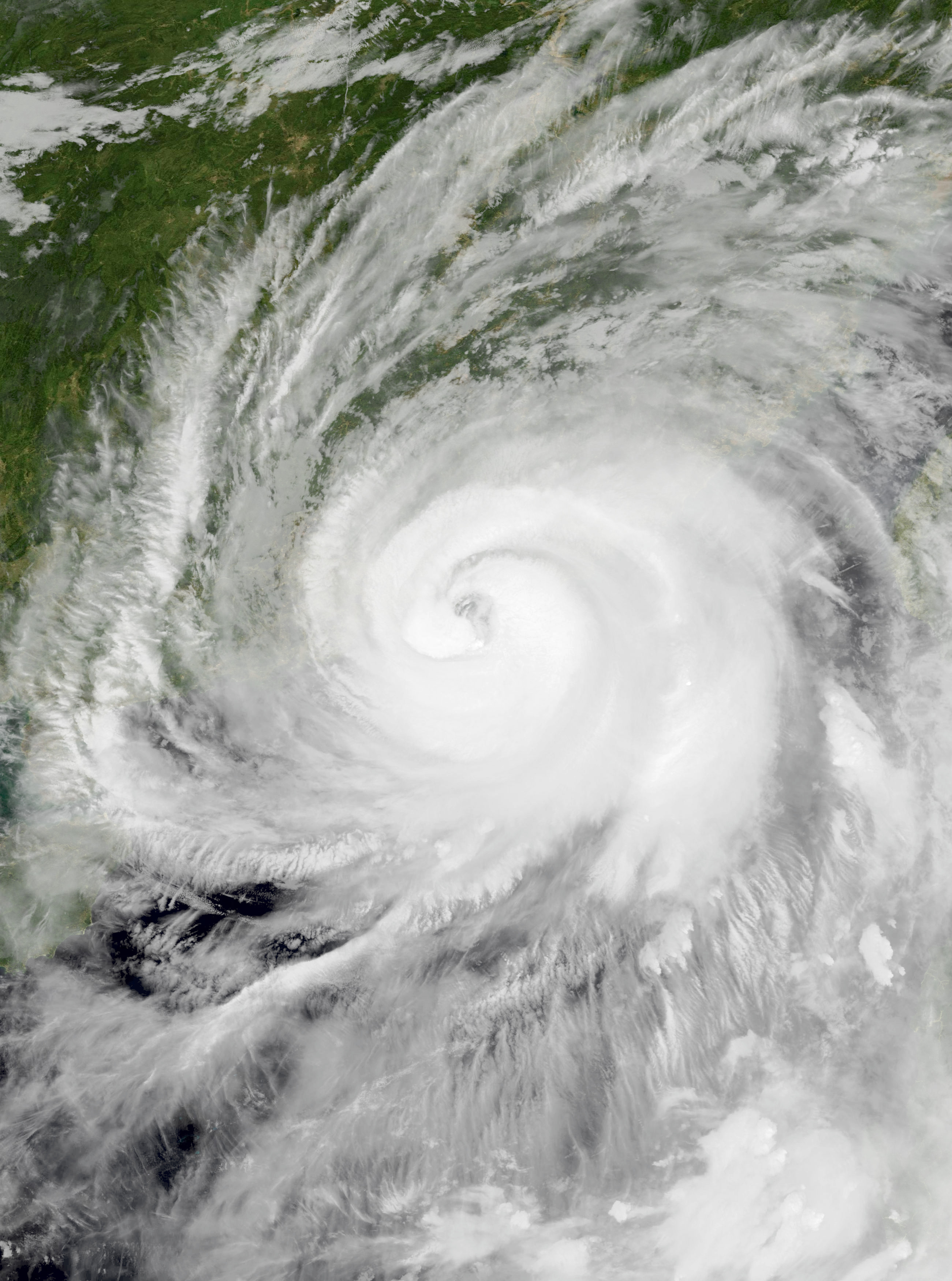
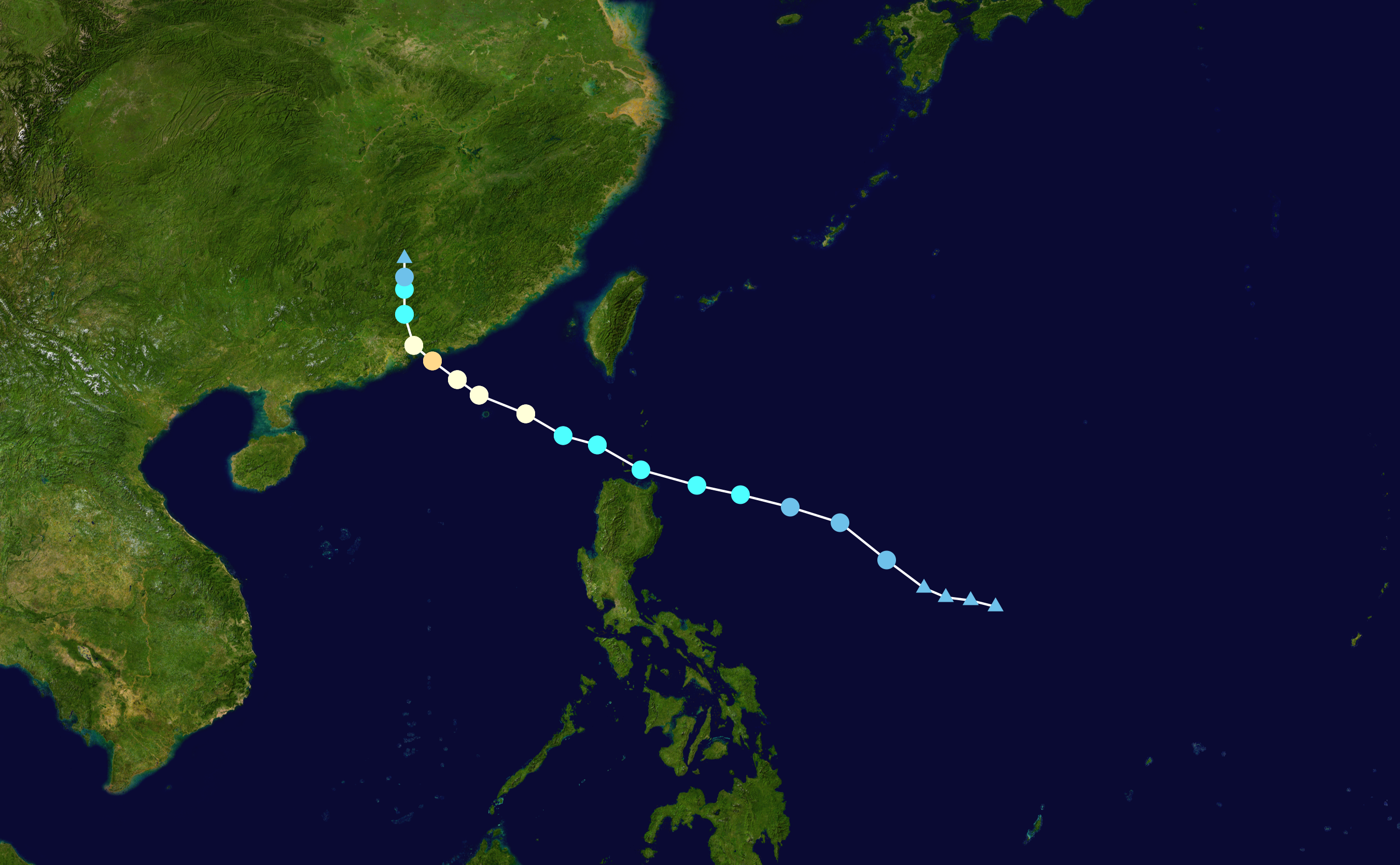
- Duration: July 22 – July 27
- Peak intensity: 130 km/h (80 mph) (10-min); 965 hPa (mbar)

On July 21, the JTWC marked an area of low-pressure that formed 253 nm (469 km) north-northwest of Yap, with satellite imagery indicated a broad area of cyclonic low-level rotation associated with weak flaring convection. On July 22, at 20:00 PHT (12:00 UTC), PAGASA upgraded the system into a tropical depression, assigning the domestic name Kiyapo. At 09:00 UTC of the following day, JTWC followed suit, designating Kiyapo as 11W, citing a consolidating and partially exposed LLCC. Later that day, JMA and JTWC upgraded 11W into a tropical storm, with the former agency assigning the name Noul. As it continues to steadily intensify, Noul made landfall over Camiguin Island in Calayan, Cagayan on the following day at 14:10 PHT (06:10 UTC). Afterwards, JMA and PAGASA upgraded Noul into a severe tropical storm. The storm continued to strengthen while moving west-northwestward as all three agencies upgraded it into a typhoon. Early on July 26 at 03:50 CST (19:50 UTC), Noul made its second and final landfall along the coast of Huidong County, Guangdong as a Category 2-equivalent typhoon on the Saffir–Simpson scale as its intensity peaked at 100 mph (155 km/h) with a minimum pressure of 967 mbar (hPa). After making landfall, Noul started rapidly weakening, going from a strong typhoon to a severe tropical storm in two hours as it moved further inland. Noul was last noted on July 27 as it dissipated.

=== Typhoon Dolphin ===
- Violent typhoon (JMA)
- Category 5 super typhoon (SSHWS)
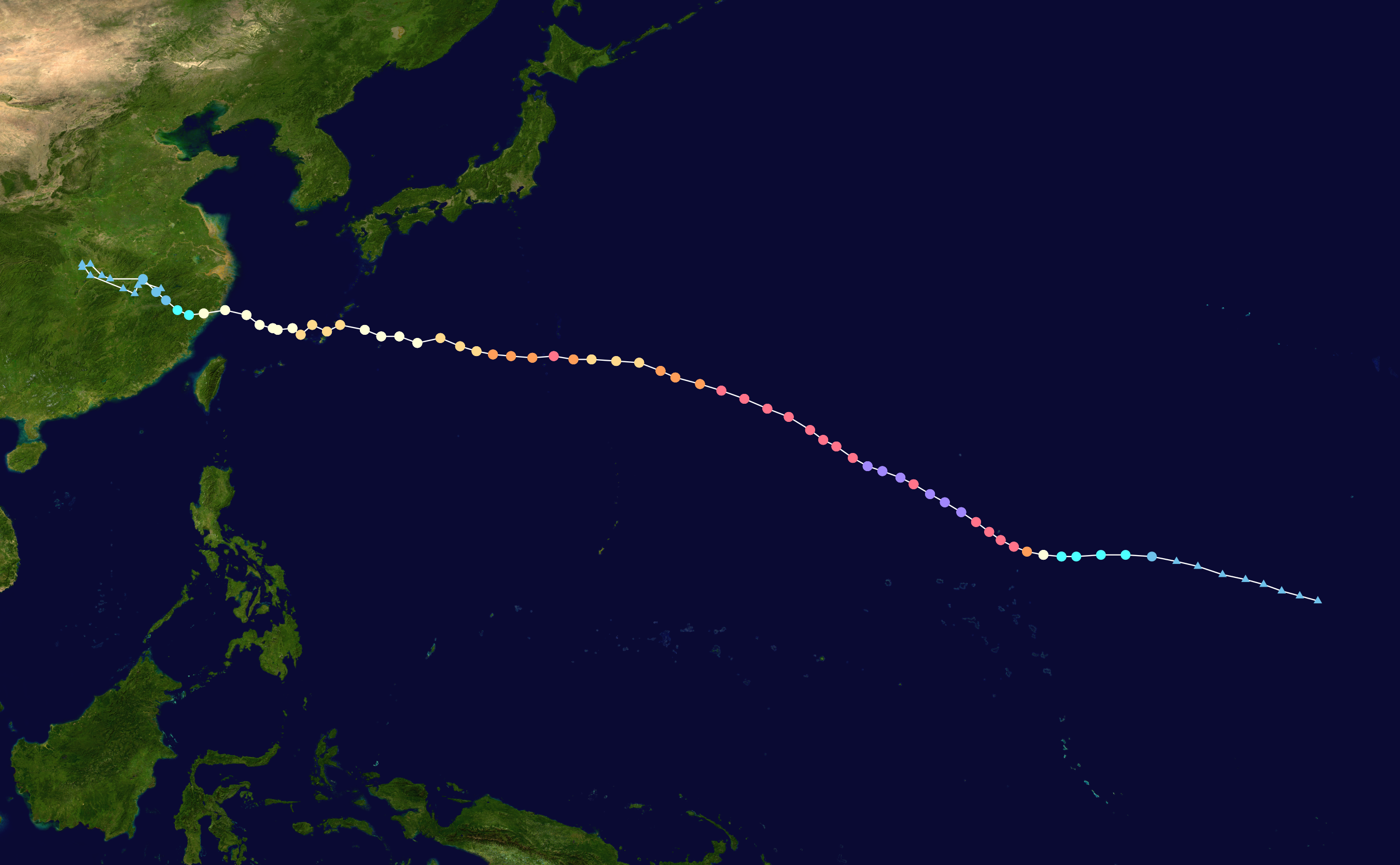
- Duration: July 26 – August 12
- Peak intensity: 205 km/h (125 mph) (10-min); 915 hPa (mbar)

On July 19, the National Hurricane Center (NHC) began monitoring a disturbance south of the Hawaiian Islands. When the disturbance had a high 90% chance of development in the next two days, it was designated Invest 92C. Later on July 26, the disturbance crossed into the Western Pacific, and the JMA classified the system as a tropical depression upon crossover. The following day at midnight, The JTWC upgraded the disturbance to a tropical depression, designating it as 12W. Shortly thereafter, the Japan Meteorological Agency upgraded the system to a tropical storm, naming it Dolphin. Almost immediately after its nomenclature, Dolphin began a period of rapid intensification, the fastest since Typhoon Noru in 2022, quickly becoming a typhoon and reaching a Category 4-equivalent initial peak intensity on the Saffir–Simpson scale on July 28, before its intensification was stunted by an eyewall replacement cycle. After finishing, Dolphin resumed intensifying once again, reaching super typhoon status the following day. Soon after reaching Category 5 strength on the Saffir–Simpson scale, Dolphin started undergoing a second eyewall replacement cycle, temporarily halting further development of the storm. After completing its eyewall replacement cycle, it strengthened back to Category 5-equivalent strength but later started weakening again after started a third eyewall replacement cycle. On August 4, after it completed a fourth eyewall replacement cycle, Dolphin rapidly intensified back into a Category 4-equivalent typhoon, but a few hours later, it once again entered unfavourable conditions and weakened back into a category 2 typhoon. On August 9, Dolphin made landfall over Yuhuan in China's Zhejiang province at 17:30 CST on August 9, followed by a second landfall over Wenzhou an hour later, in almost the exact same spot Bavi made landfall nearly a month prior. It weakened into a tropical depression on August 11 due to land interaction.

Despite the system remaining outside the PAR, significant rainfall was reported in Metro Manila and 23 provinces as Dolphin enhanced the southwest monsoon.

=== Tropical Storm Kujira (Luis–Maymay) ===
- Tropical storm (JMA)
- Tropical storm (SSHWS)
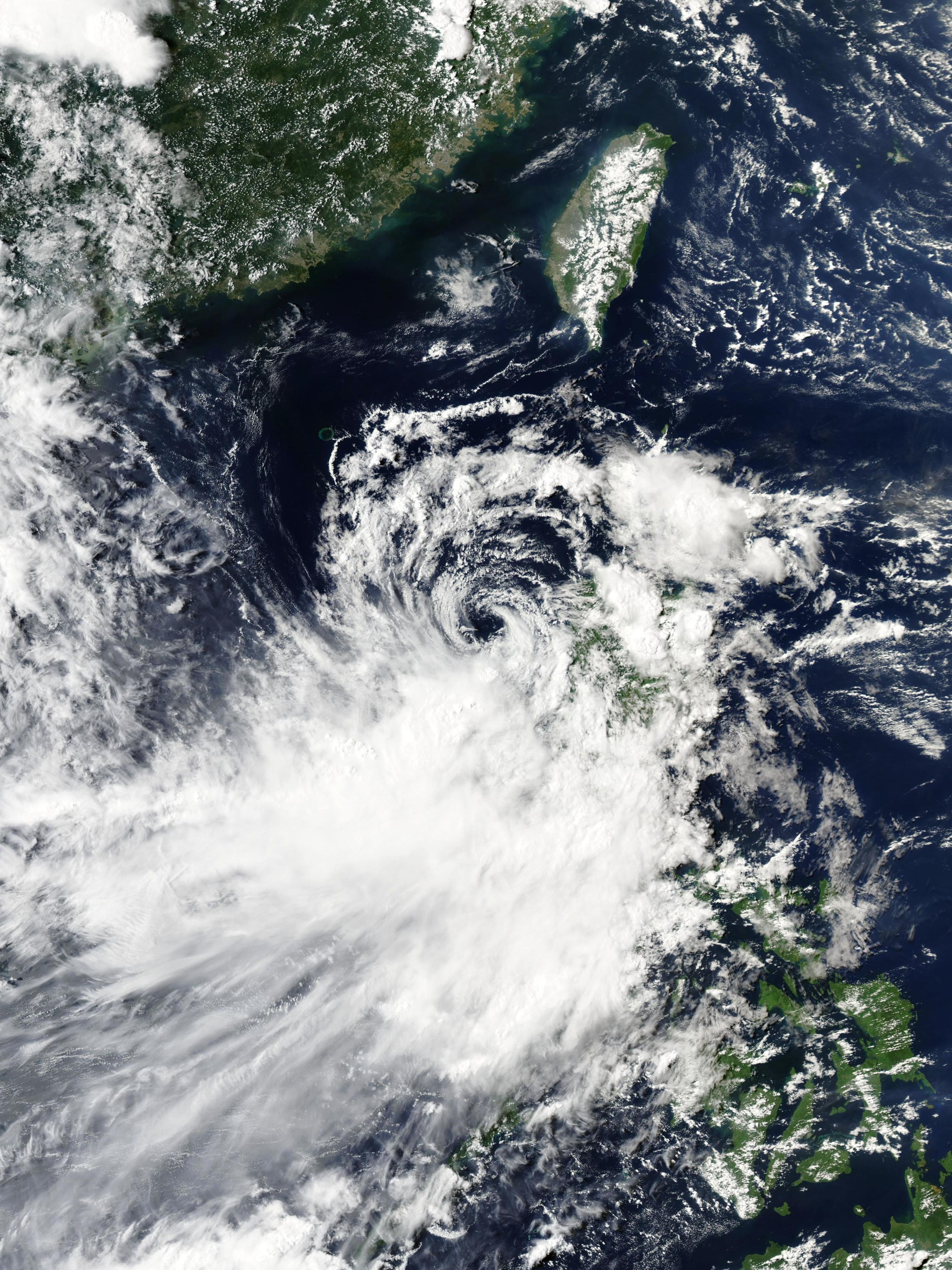
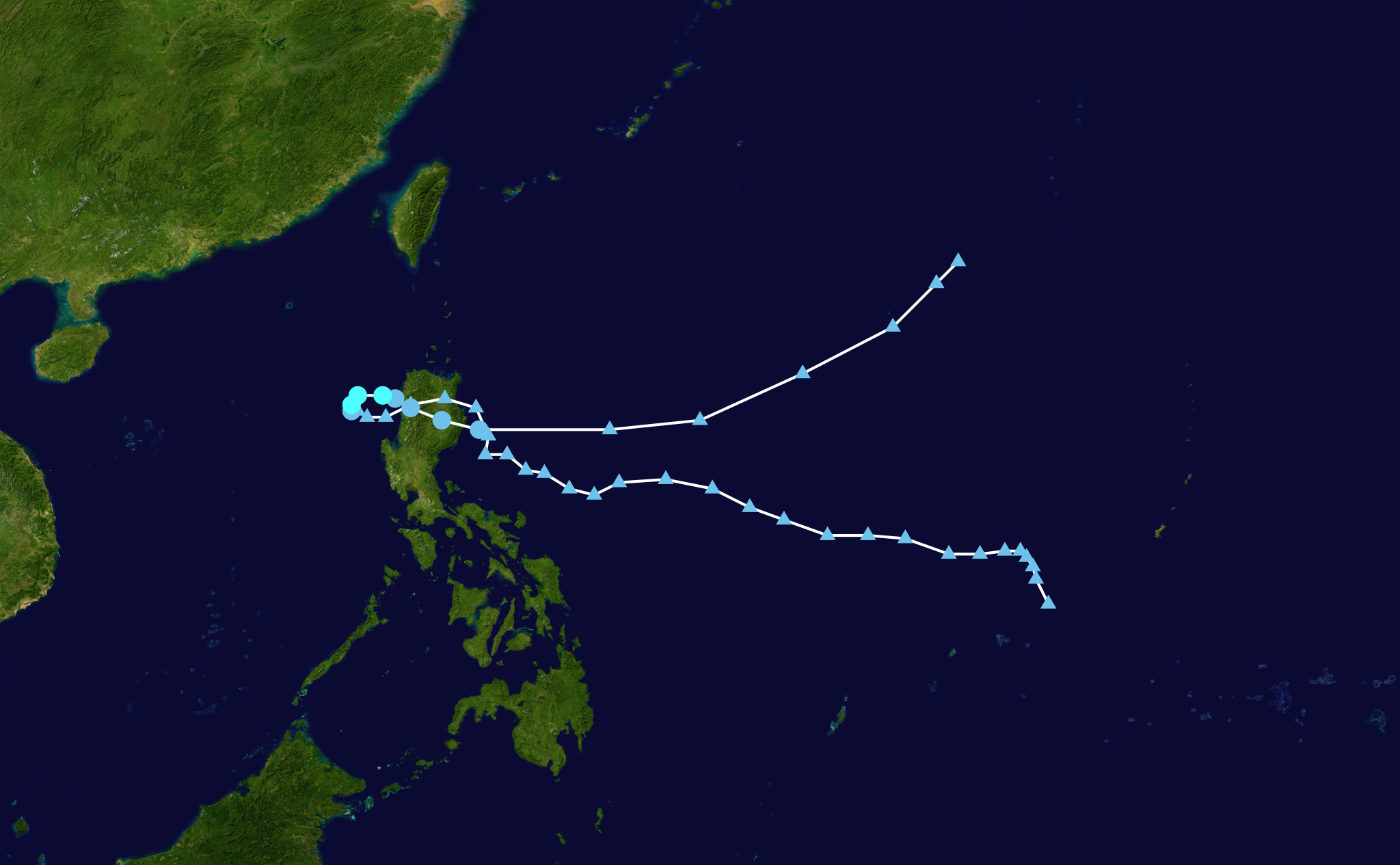
- Duration: July 30 – August 6 (Note: The JTWC recognises this system to have regenerated into Peilou as one continuous system, therefore it also has the same designation as Peilou.)
- Peak intensity: 75 km/h (45 mph) (10-min); 994 hPa (mbar)

On July 29, the JTWC and PAGASA began monitoring a low pressure area outside the PAR, citing an unlikely chance of development. On July 30, the JMA upgraded the disturbance to a tropical depression, and PAGASA followed suit on two days later on August 1, assigning it the name Luis. Later that day, at 18:00 UTC, as Luis was situated east-northeast of Legazpi, Albay, the JTWC raised the system's chances of becoming a tropical cyclone to medium, citing a slowly consolidating low-level circulation center (LLCC). At 19:30 UTC. Luis made its first landfall over Maconacon, Isabela. PAGASA stated it degenerated into a low pressure area later that day, a part of it split into a second low pressure area in the South China Sea, meanwhile the original system became a remnant low and merged with the second system a few hours later. The JMA also started issuing warnings once again at the same time. The disturbance redeveloped into a tropical depression and was retrospectively renamed Maymay by PAGASA. At 18:00 UTC, both the JMA and PAGASA upgraded it to a tropical storm and the JTWC upgraded it to a tropical depression, therefore being assigned the name Kujira by the JMA and the designation 13W from the JTWC, respectively. Early on August 6, Kujira made its second landfall over Magsingal, Ilocos Sur. Later, the JMA downgraded the system to a tropical depression and later stated it dissipated. The following day, the system weakened into a remnant low over the Philippine sea and later it dissipated according to PAGASA. Kujira was later absorbed into Typhoon Dolphin and became a trough.

In the Philippines, flooding was reported in seven areas of Bangsamoro and Zamboanga Peninsula. Several landslides occurred in Dipaculao, Aurora and a downed utility pole blocked a road in the same municipality. A total of 80,633 people were affected by the storm. Upon Kujira's second landfall in the Philippines, torrential rains fell across Luzon. Several roads were closed due to the effect of landslides and flooding. A wooden bridge was also destroyed by floods in Quirino. More than 4,700 households were affected by flooding in Buluan after a river overflowed. At least 13 people died from the effects of the storm, with 9 missing. Agricultural and infrastructural damage in Pangasinan reached ₱105.7 million (US$1.73 million). The Department of Agriculture reported a total of ₱689.66 million worth of agricultural damage from the storm along with the effects of the southwest monsoon.

=== Severe Tropical Storm Chan-hom ===
- Severe tropical storm (JMA)
- Tropical storm (SSHWS)
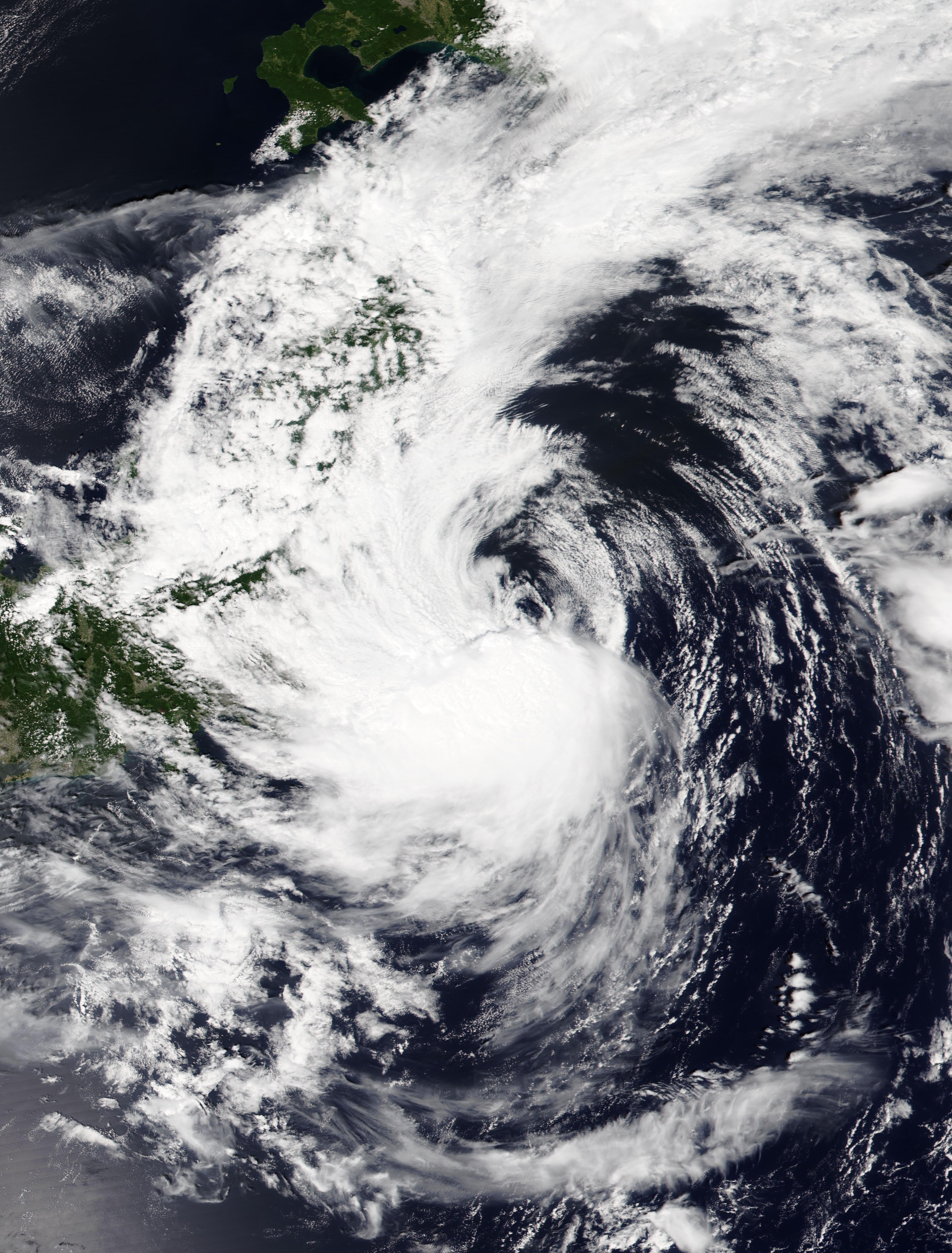
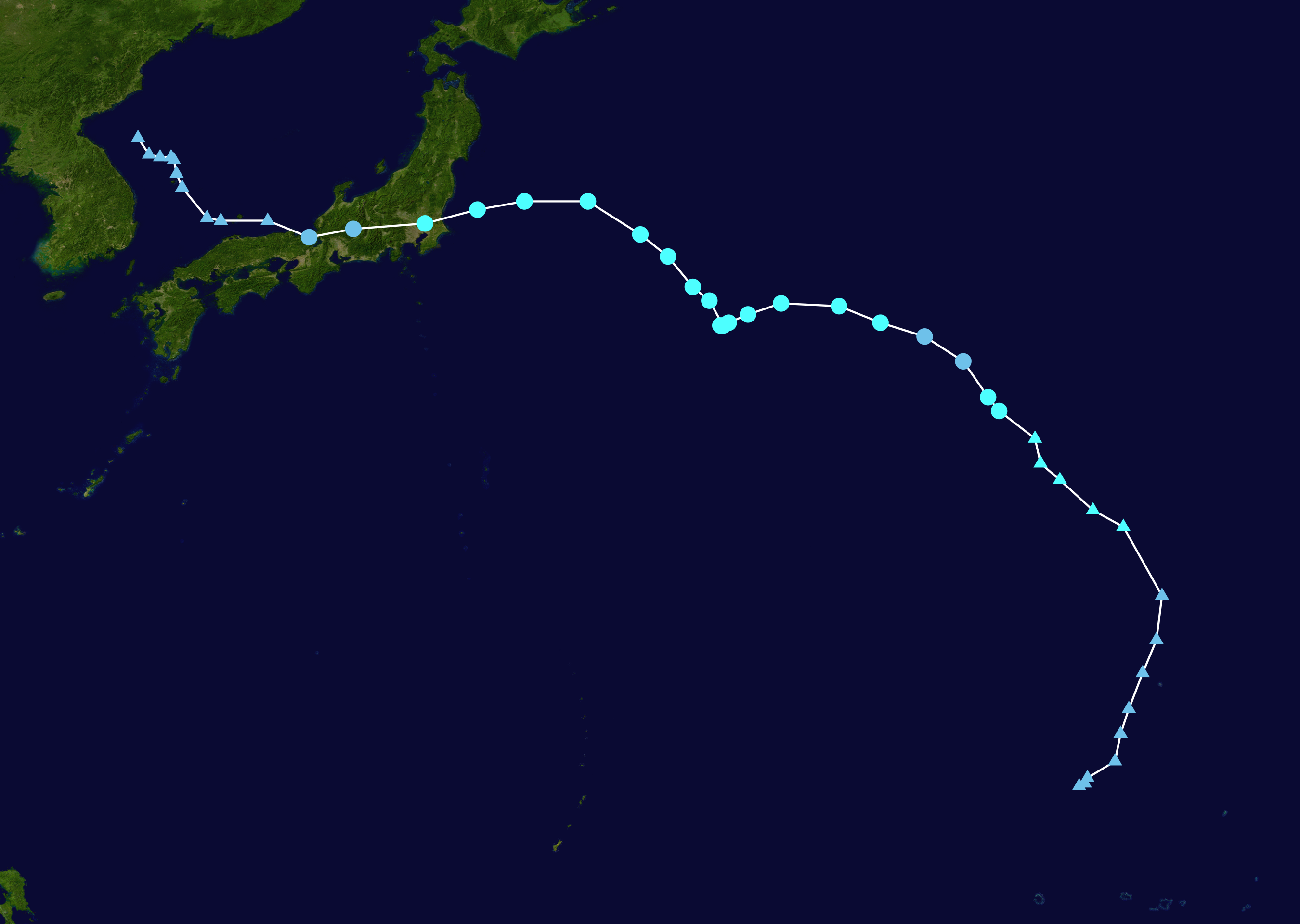
- Duration: August 5 – August 15
- Peak intensity: 95 km/h (60 mph) (10-min); 980 hPa (mbar)

On August 4, the JTWC marked an area of low-pressure that formed 116 nm (215 km) south-southeast of Wake Island, classifying it as a monsoon depression later that evening. The following day, the JMA upgraded the low pressure to a tropical depression. A few hours later, the JMA further upgraded the tropical depression to a tropical storm, assigning it the name Chan-hom. Due to its nature as a monsoon depression, the storm was quite disorganized, consisting of a broad and partially exposed low-level circulation with multiple mesovortices embedded within it. On August 6, the JTWC upgraded it to a tropical storm, designating it as 14W. Later that day, JTWC downgraded it to a tropical depression. The following day, JTWC once again upgraded it to a tropical storm. The system made landfall as a severe tropical storm with winds of 95 km/h (60 mph) in Ibaraki Prefecture in Japan on a rare east-to-west trajectory, making it the first storm to make landfall in Ibaraki Prefecture since the JMA started keeping records in 1951. On August 12, the JMA downgraded the system to a tropical depression as it entered unfavorable conditions.

Chan-hom produced strong wind gusts in parts of Japan's Kantō region. Wind gusts in excess of 100 kilometres per hour (62 mph) were observed in Kitaibaraki, Ibaraki. Two women in Ibaraki suffered injuries due to strong winds. A tree was also downed possibly due to the storm near Omote-sandō Station in Tokyo, with no injuries. In total, Chan-hom injured seven people, two men in Iwate Prefecture, four women in Ibaraki Prefecture, and one man in Tochigi Prefecture. Chan-hom left 22,000 homes without electricity. The weather affected tourists during Obon. 60 flights at Haneda Airport were canceled. A beach in Ōarai was closed.

=== Tropical Storm Peilou ===
- Tropical storm (JMA)
- Tropical storm (SSHWS)
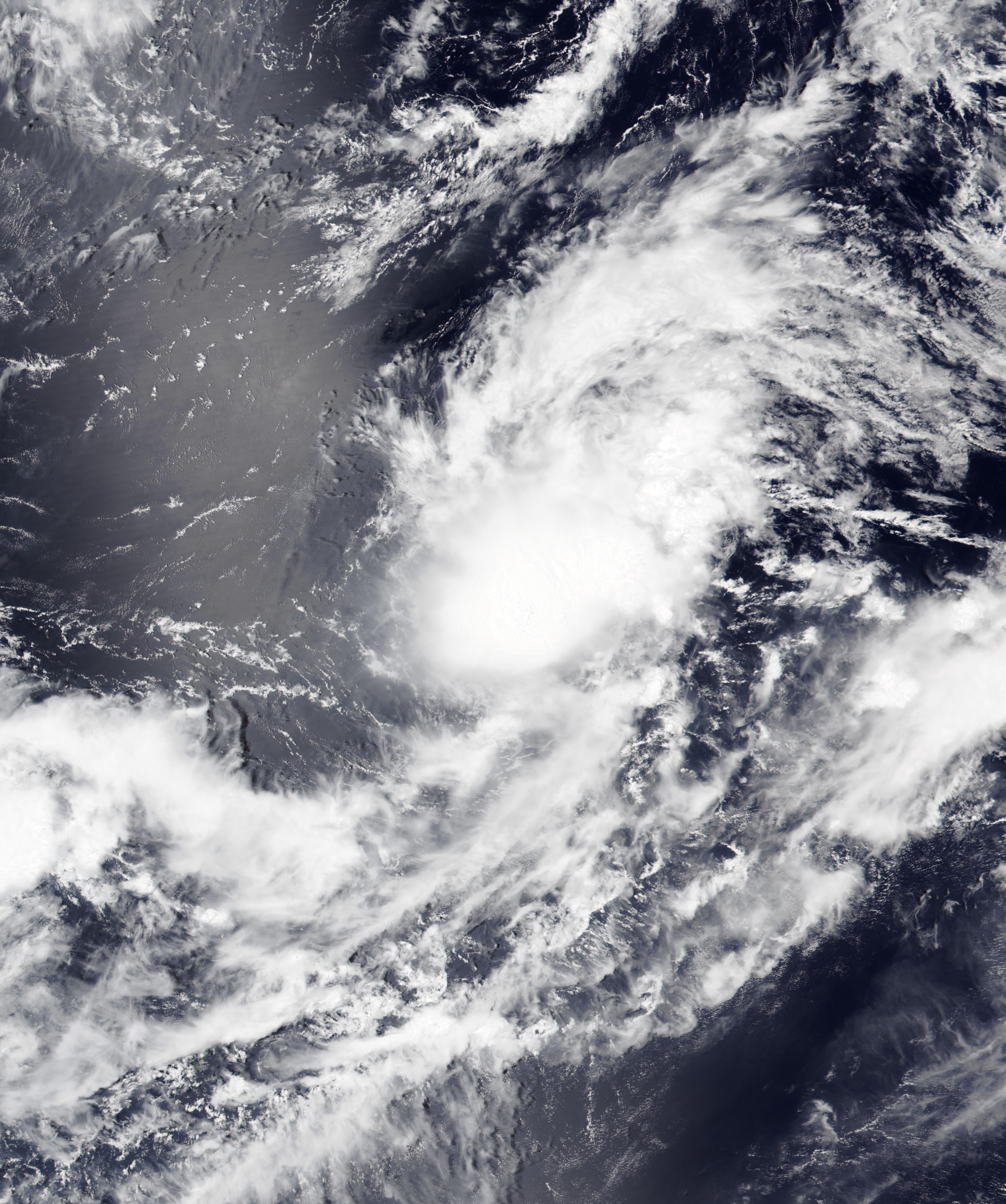
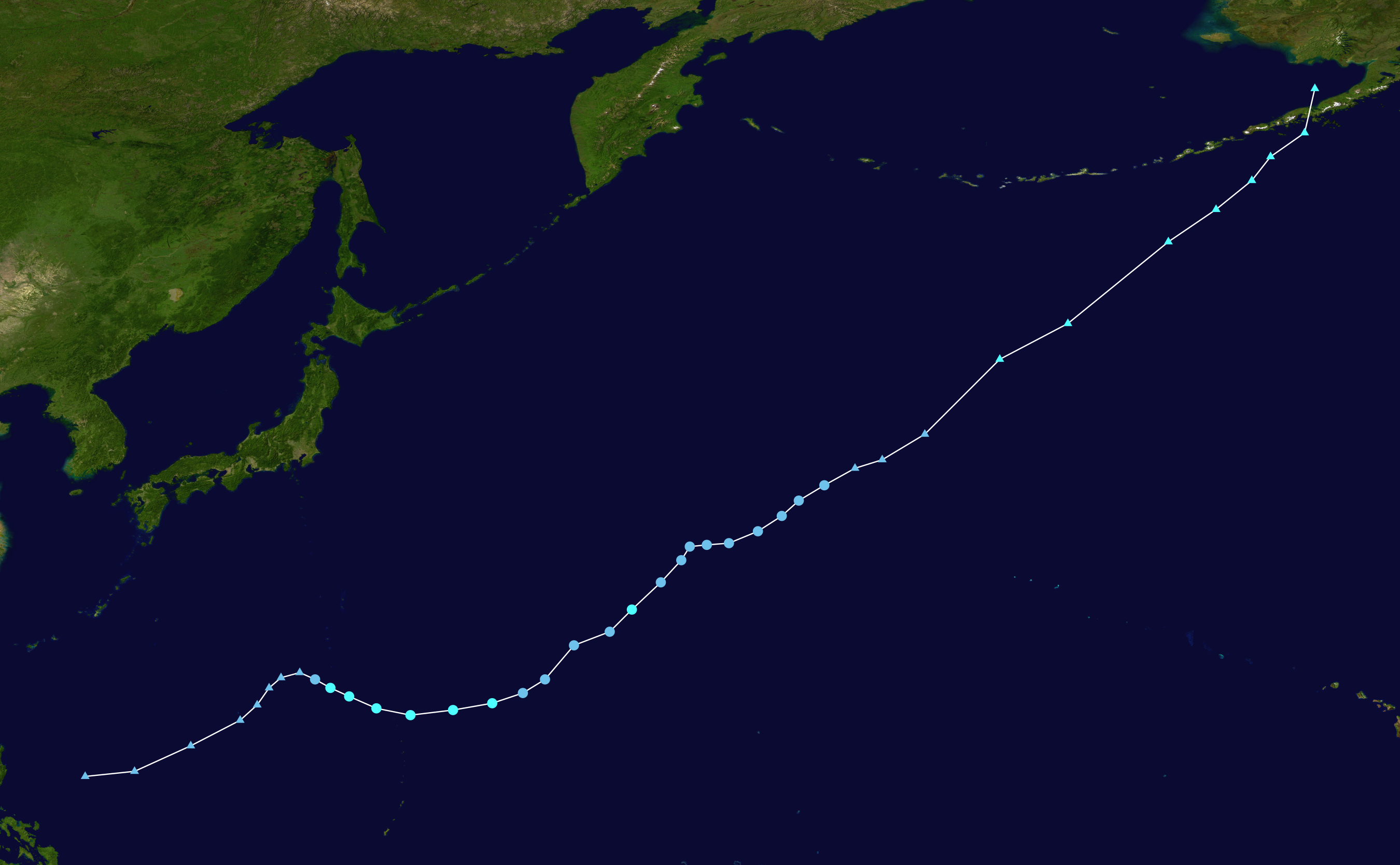
- Duration: August 8 (Note: The JTWC recognises this system as a regeneration of Kujira, therefore it also has the same designation as Kujira.) – August 13
- Peak intensity: 75 km/h (45 mph) (10-min); 996 hPa (mbar)

On August 8, a trough related to the remnants of Tropical Storm Kujira split from Typhoon Dolphin and the JMA upgraded it to a tropical depression. Later that day, the JTWC followed suit, but its designation was kept the same as that of Kujira, stating that it is a redevelopment of Kujira. PAGASA later followed suit, classifying it as a depression as well. On August 9, both the JMA and PAGASA upgraded the system into a tropical storm, with the system being assigned the name Peilou. The JTWC later followed suit and continued the sequence of bulletins and track forecasts previously issued for Kujira. Peilou slowly intensified, reaching 85 km/h and a central pressure of 992 mbar on August 10 at 12:00 UTC. But it reached unfavorable conditions later that day and downgraded into a tropical depression according to the JTWC. The JMA followed suit on August 12, downgrading Peilou to a tropical depression on its final prognostic reasoning of the system. The JTWC continued tracking the system, noting that it began extratropical transition on August 13.

=== Tropical Storm Nangka ===
- Tropical storm (JMA)
- Tropical storm (SSHWS)
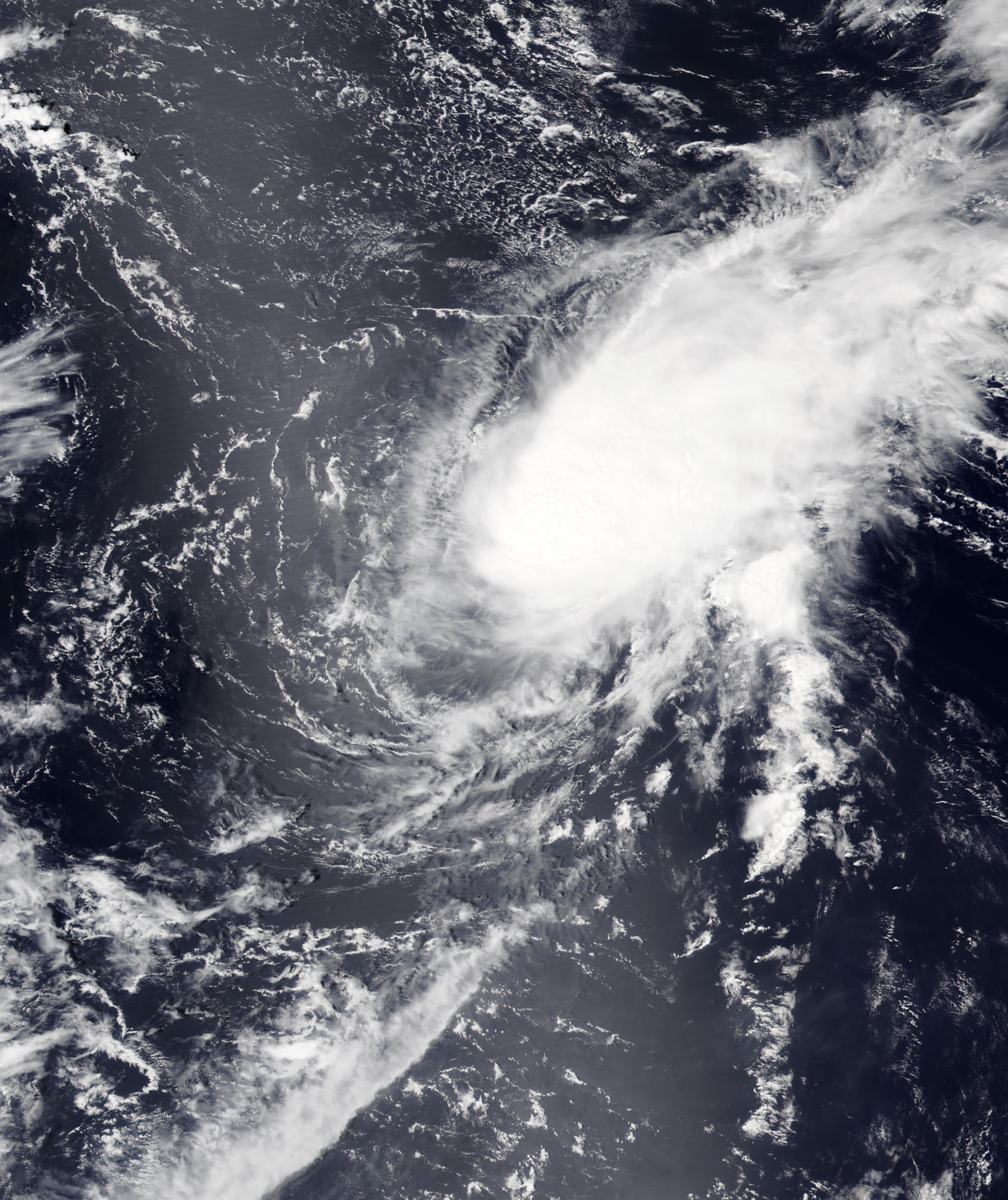
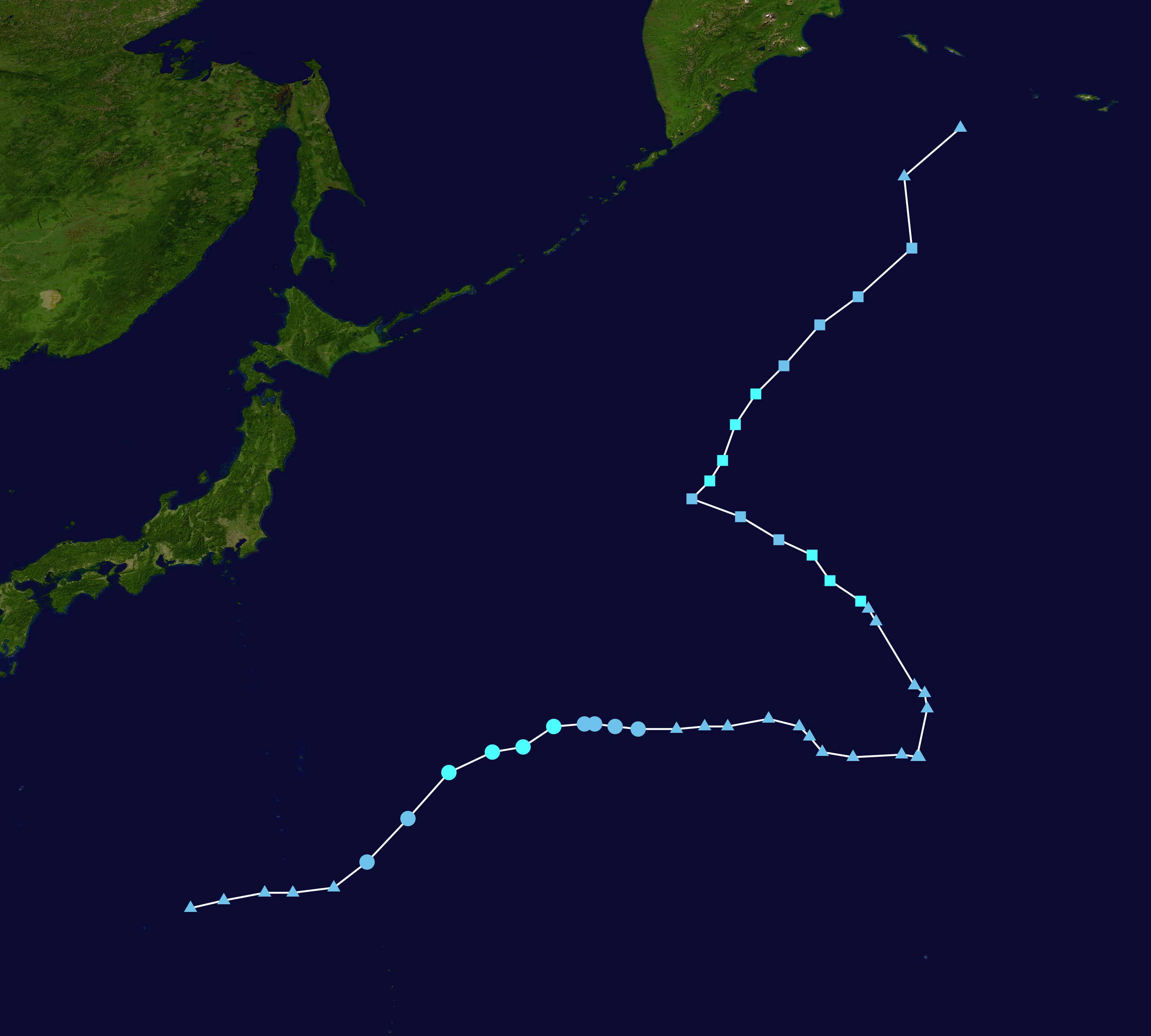
- Duration: August 11 – August 16
- Peak intensity: 75 km/h (45 mph) (10-min); 990 hPa (mbar)

On August 11 at 00:00 UTC, the JMA reported that a tropical depression formed near Iwo Jima. The following day, the JMA upgraded the depression into a tropical storm, assigning it the name Nangka. Later that day, the JTWC upgraded Nangka into a tropical depression, designating it as 16W. Early on August 13, the JTWC upgraded Nangka to a tropical storm. Around the same time, the JMA assessed Nangka as having peaked with wind speeds of 40 knots (74 km/h; 46 mph) and a pressure of 990 hPa (mbar). The following day, The JTWC downgraded Nangka to a tropical depression. Later, JMA reported that Nangka had undergone extratropical transition and become an extratropical cyclone. Nangka's remnants were remarked as a subtropical storm by the JTWC as a separate entity, which turned into an extratropical cyclone a week later..

=== Typhoon Saudel (Obet) ===
- Very strong typhoon (JMA)
- Category 4 typhoon (SSHWS)
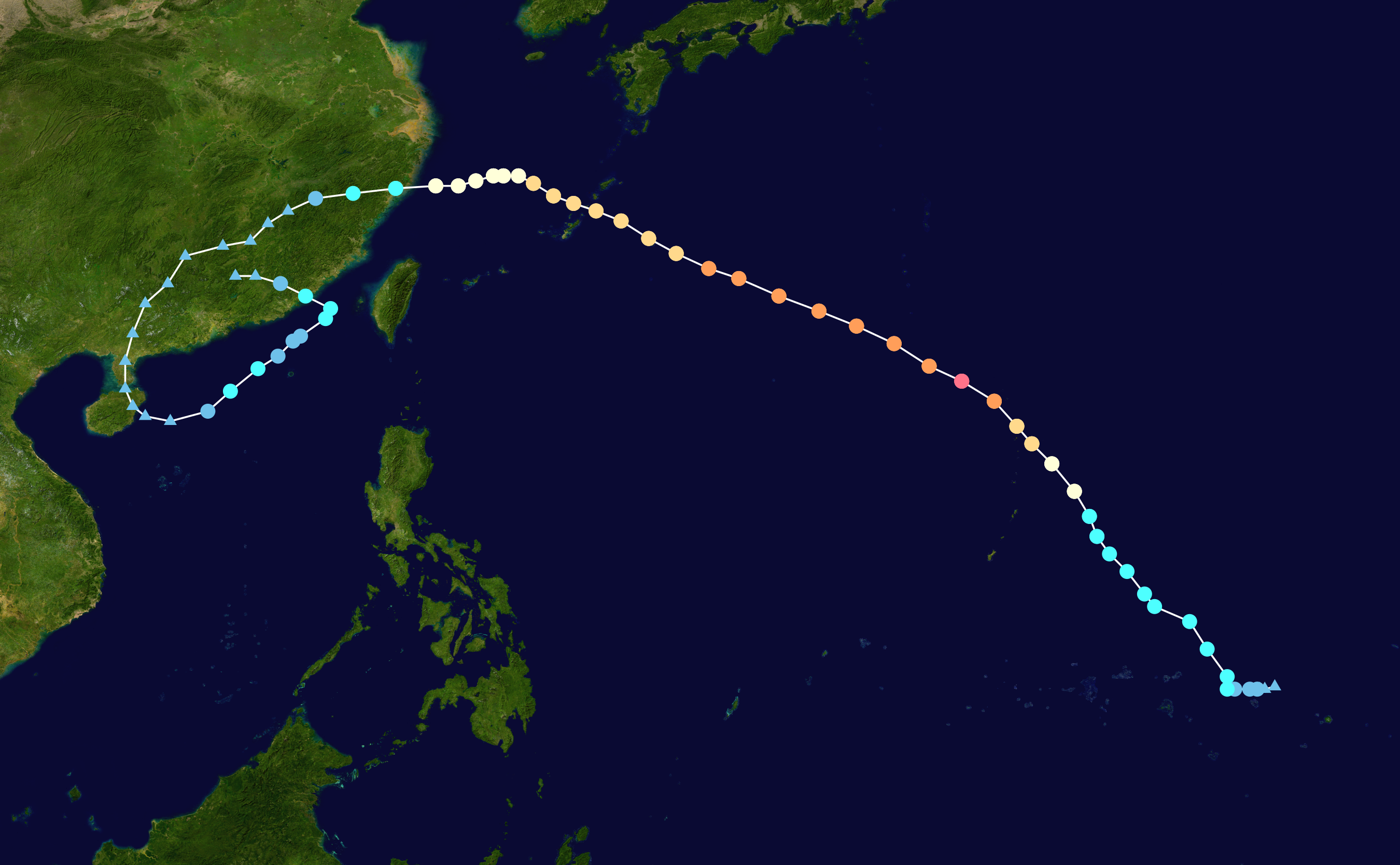
- Duration: August 15 – September 4
- Peak intensity: 165 km/h (105 mph) (10-min); 940 hPa (mbar)

On August 15, the JMA noted that a tropical depression formed near Palikir, Micronesia, though they downgraded it back to a low-pressure area 12 hours later. The following day, the JMA classified it as a tropical depression again. On August 18, the JTWC classified the system as a depression, giving it the designation 17W. The following day at 03:00 UTC, the JMA upgraded the system to a tropical storm, assigning it the name Saudel. The JTWC followed suit later that day, upgrading the system to a tropical storm. On August 20, the JMA upgraded the system to a severe tropical storm. The following day, both the JMA and JTWC upgraded Saudel to a typhoon after it underwent rapid intensification. Saudel peaked with 1 minute winds of 209 km/h (130 mph) and a pressure of 940 hPa (mbar). After its peak intensity, Saudel began gradually weakening, soon losing category 4 status. On August 24, Saudel entered the PAR, leading PAGASA to name the system Obet. On August 28, Saudel made two landfalls over China's Zhejiang province, the first over Yuhuan at 08:05 CST (00:05 UTC), and the second at 09:10 CST (01:10 UTC) over Wenzhou, both at category 1 typhoon status. Later that day, the JMA downgraded the system to a tropical depression. Saudel later weakened to a remnant low over China. Saudel eventually exited back out into the South China Sea on August 30 and JMA issued a gale warning. The following day, the JTWC recognized its remnants, whilst stating that it had a low chance of redevelopment. Later that day, the JTWC upgraded it to medium chance, as its structure began to organize. The JMA upgraded Saudel back into a tropical storm after exiting out to the South China Sea. On September 1, the JTWC resumed advisories on the system, as it upgraded Saudel to a tropical storm. But the system was downgraded to a tropical depression later that day. The next day, the JTWC upgraded Saudel once again to a tropical storm. At 06:30 CST (21:30 UTC) on September 3, Saudel made its third and final landfall over Zhangzhou, Fujian.

The HKO issued Standby Signal No. 1 at 18:10 HKT (10:10 UTC), the SMG followed suit at 18:30 MST (10:30 UTC).

Saudel left three people injured in Okinawa Prefecture, Japan. A mudslide induced by Saudel's remnants killed one person and left 11 others missing in Suichuan, Jiangxi, China, and damaged 12 houses.

=== Tropical Storm Narra ===
- Tropical storm (JMA)
- Tropical storm (SSHWS)
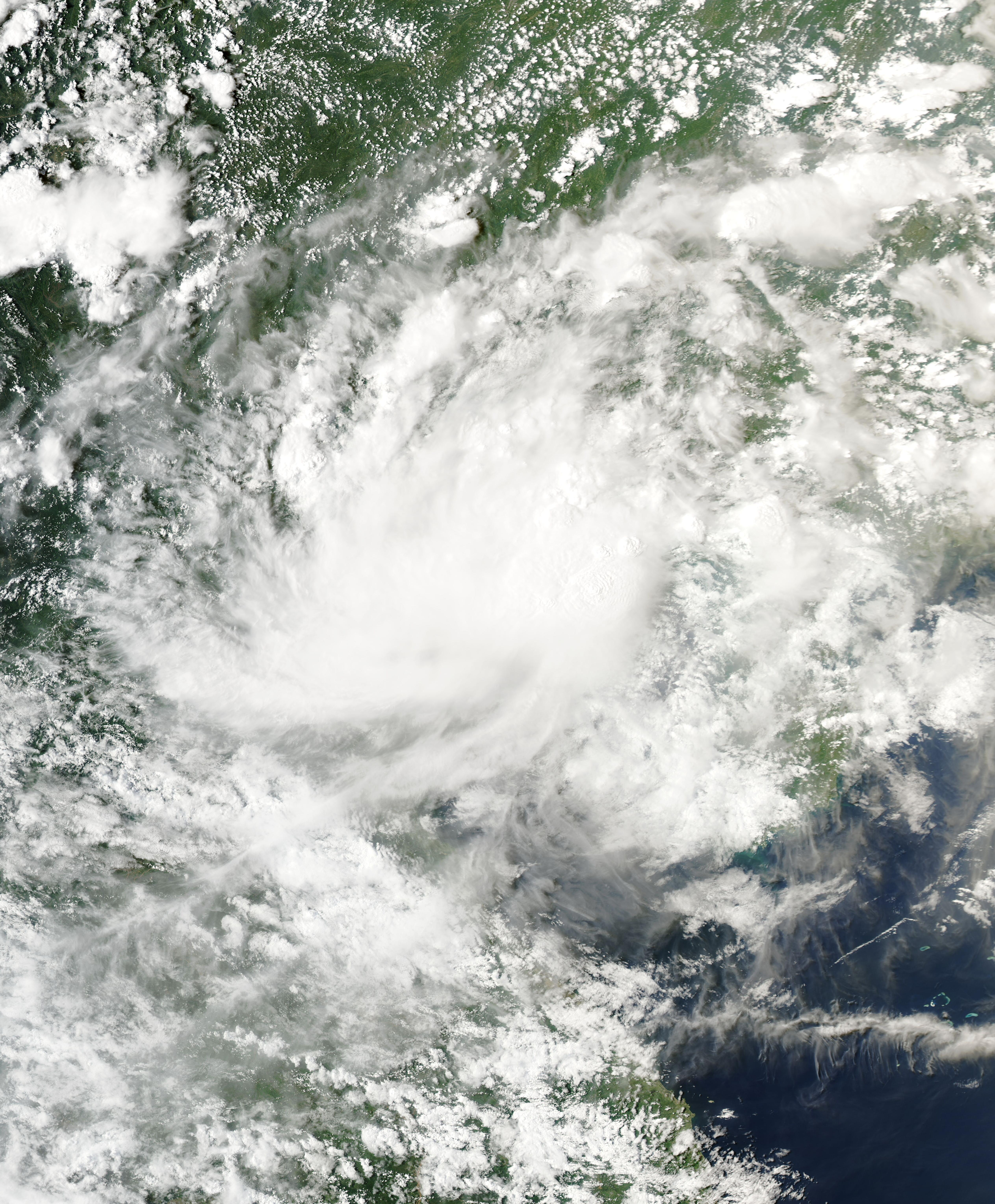
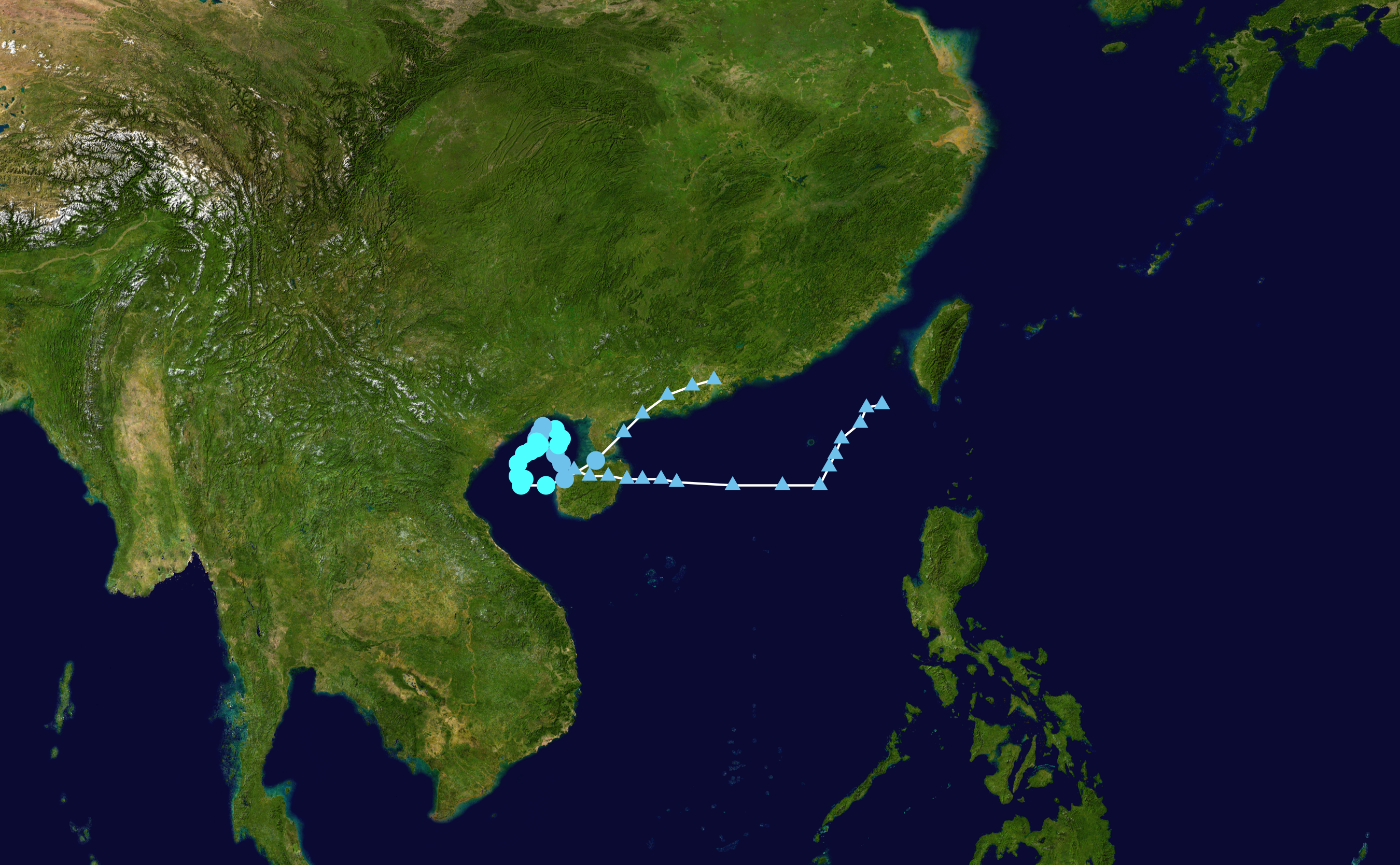
- Duration: August 17 – August 27
- Peak intensity: 75 km/h (45 mph) (10-min); 990 hPa (mbar)

On August 17, the JMA noted that a tropical depression formed west-southwest of Cape Eluanbi. However, the system degenerated into a low pressure area on the following day. At the same time, PAGASA recognized the system as a low pressure area, assigning it a medium chance of development in 24 hours. Later that day, PAGASA recognized the system as a tropical depression. After transiting the northern South China Sea, the JMA designated the low-pressure area once again as a tropical depression on August 20 while over Hainan. That evening, the JTWC labeled the system 18W. Around 11:30 HKT (03:30 UTC), the HKO upgraded the system to a tropical storm, the NCHMF also upgraded this system to a tropical storm at 16:00 ICT (09:00 UTC). the SMG followed suit at 21:30 MST (13:30 UTC), while the CMA designated the system to a tropical storm on 17:30 CST. On the morning of August 22, the JMA upgraded the system to a tropical storm, assigning it the name Narra. At 18:00 UTC on August 23, Narra reached its peak intensity with wind speeds of 75 km/h (45 mph) and a minimum central pressure of 990 mbar while remaining nearly stationary over the Gulf of Tonkin. At 18:40 CST (10:40 UTC) on August 25, Narra made landfall over Changjiang Li Autonomous County, in Hainan Province, China. At 03:25 CST (19:25 UTC on August 25) the next day, Narra made its second landfall over Zhanjiang, Guangdong.

Narra generated landslides and flooding across northern Vietnam that left one person dead. Flash floods in Guangxi, China were considered the worst in 18 years. More than 54,000 people were evacuated. River flooding in Chongzuo inundated buildings to their roofs.

=== Tropical Storm Gaenari (Neneng) ===
- Tropical storm (JMA)
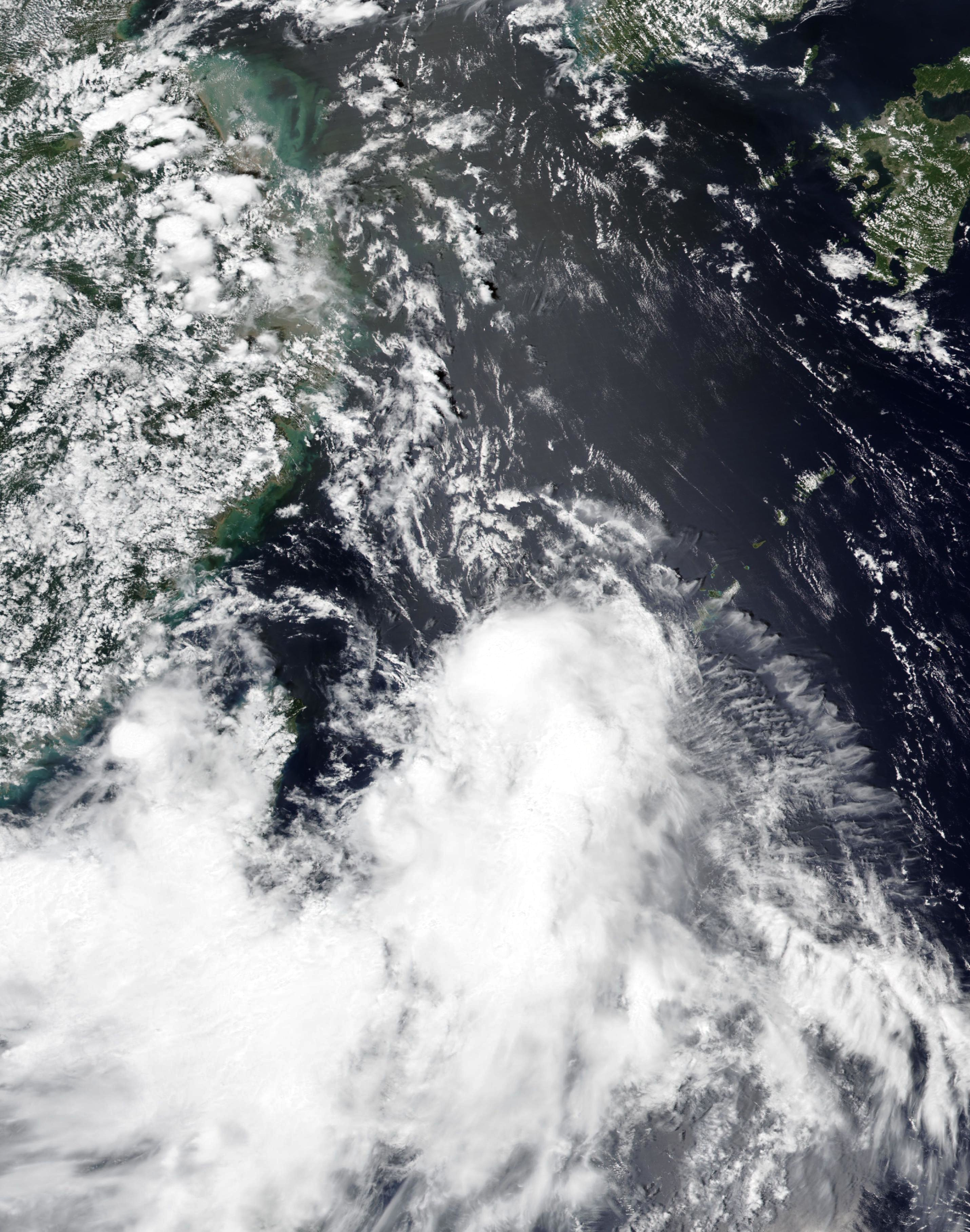
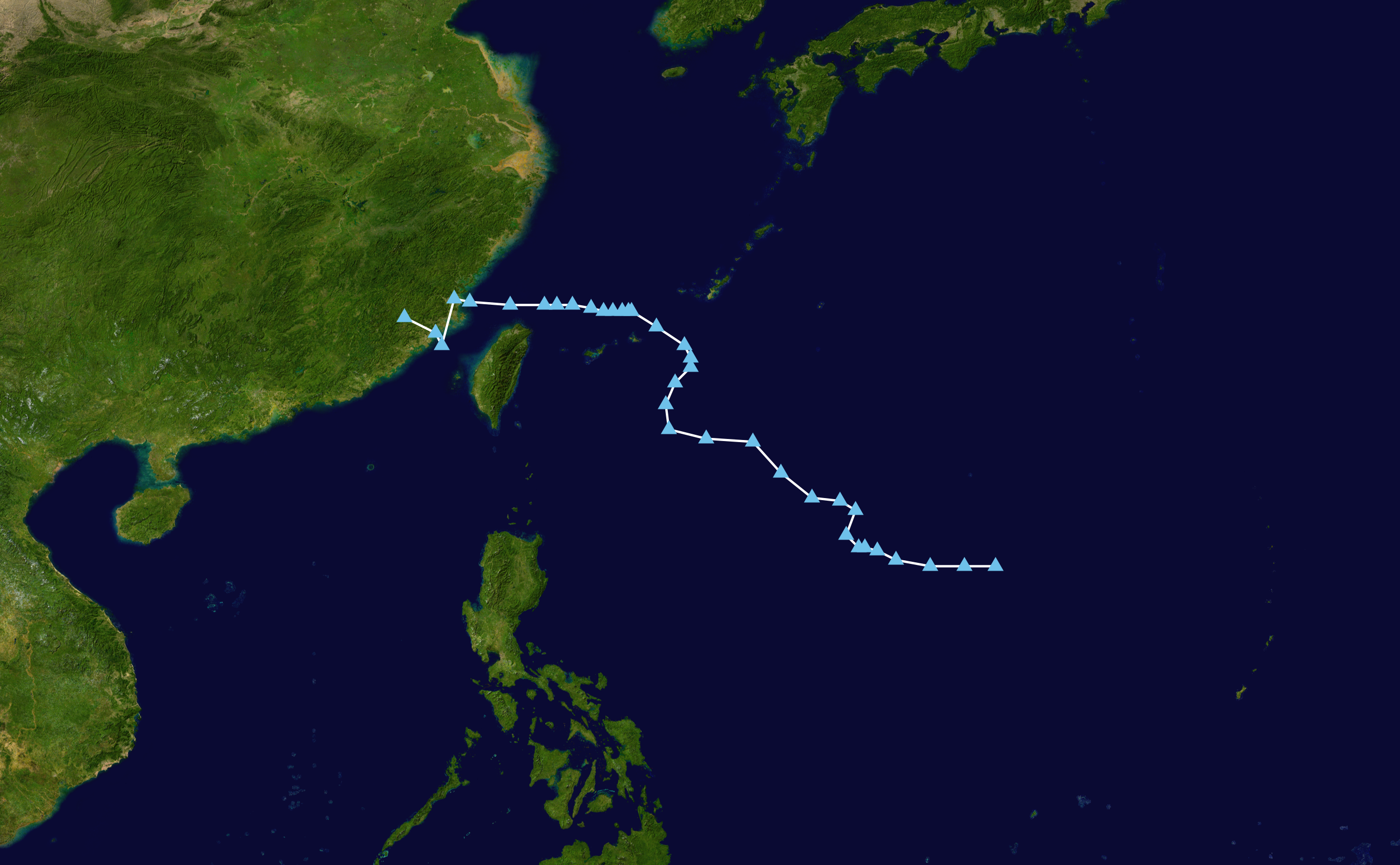
- Duration: August 18 – August 25
- Peak intensity: 65 km/h (40 mph) (10-min); 996 hPa (mbar)

On August 15, the JTWC started monitoring an area of low pressure east of Luzon, classifying it as a monsoon depression. The following day, PAGASA began monitoring the system while it was outside the PAR. The JMA followed suit on August 18, and designated it as a tropical depression. The same day, PAGASA cited that the system has a high chance of development within the next 24 hours. At 14:00 PHT (06:00 UTC), PAGASA officially named the depression Neneng. On August 19, JMA downgraded the system to a low pressure area. However, JMA redesignated the low as a tropical depression later that same day. The following day, PAGASA declared that Neneng weakened to a low pressure area as it exited the PAR. On August 22, the JMA upgraded the system to a tropical storm, assigning it the name Gaenari. On August 24, Gaenari made landfall shortly thereafter in Quanzhou, Fujian.

Heavy rainfall produced floods in the cities of Kaohsiung and Tainan. One person was killed and four others went missing. A total of 164 others were injured. The city of Kaohsiung received rainfall totals reaching 3 feet (910 mm) within a three-day period, breaking both daily and 3-day rainfall total records. There were 35 locations reported flooded and 21,071 customers lost electricity. More than 6,100 residents were evacuated.

=== Tropical Storm Atsani ===
- Tropical storm (JMA)
- Tropical depression (SSHWS)
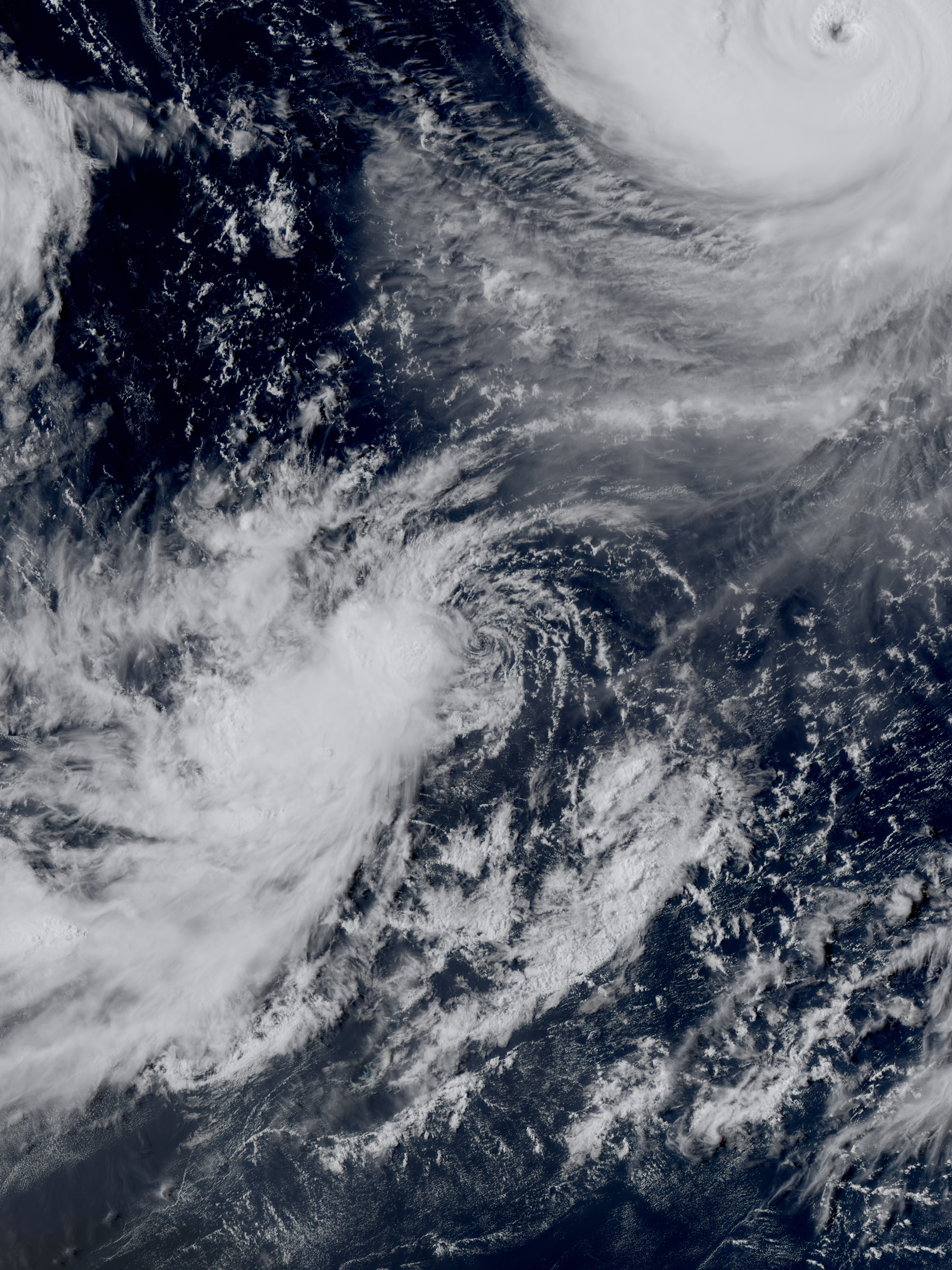
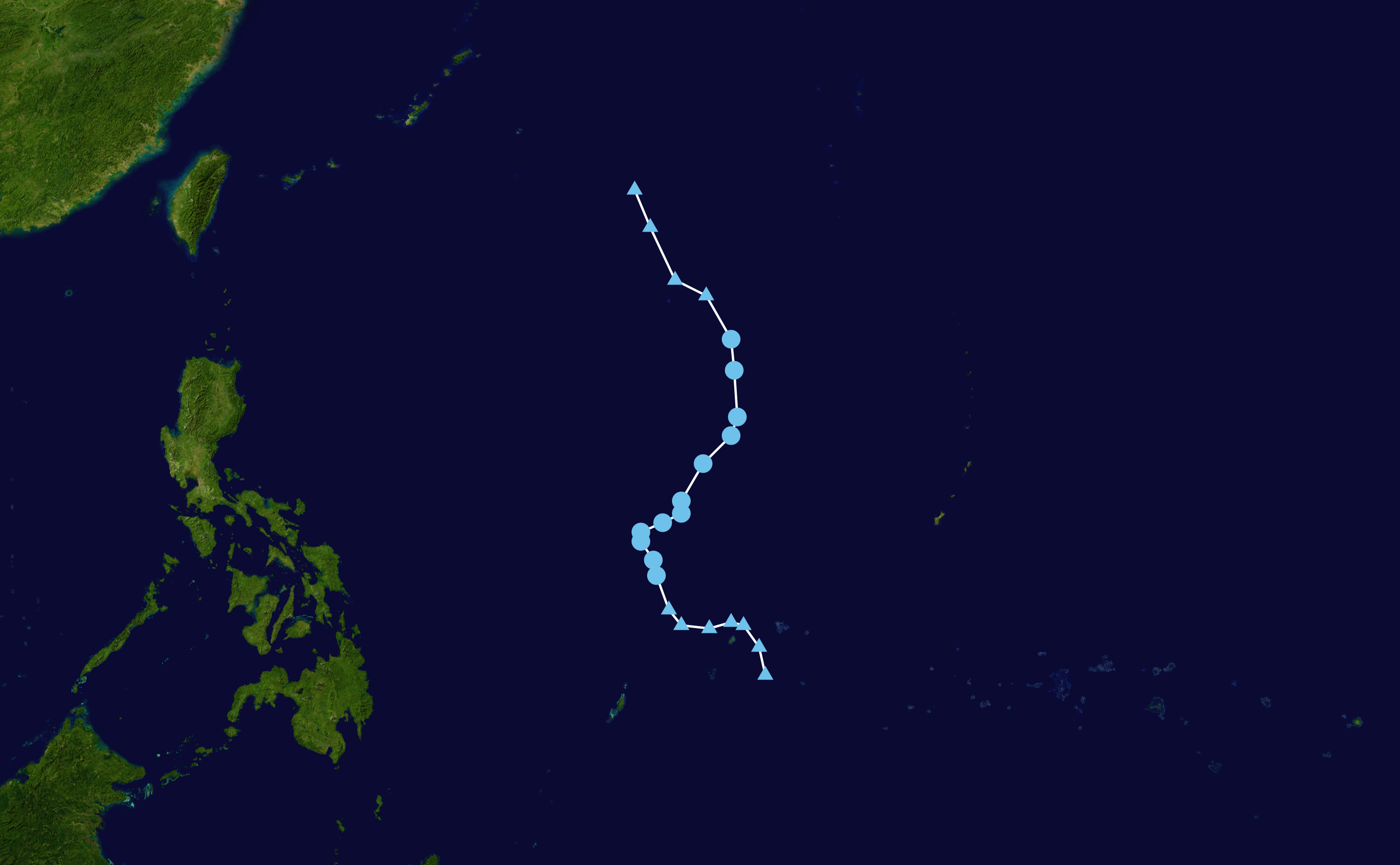
- Duration: August 22 – August 26
- Peak intensity: 65 km/h (40 mph) (10-min); 998 hPa (mbar)

Late on August 21, PAGASA reported that a tropical depression formed near Yap, just outside of the PAR. By that time, the JMA has just started tracking it as a low-pressure area while the JTWC had just designated it Invest 97W with the system having a low chance to be a tropical cyclone. The next day, the JTWC upgraded it to medium. Later that day, the JMA followed suit with PAGASA, upgrading the system to a tropical depression. On August 22, the JTWC upgraded the system to a tropical depression, and assigned it the designation 19W. On August 24, the JMA upgraded the system to a tropical storm, assigning it the name Atsani. According to the JMA, Atsani peaked with 10 minute winds of 65 km/h (40 mph) and a pressure of 998 hPa (mbar). After its peak intensity, Atsani weakened due to vertical wind shear caused by Typhoon Saudel to the north. Atsani soon weakened into a remnant low. Later, Atsani's remnants were absorbed into Typhoon Saudel, causing it to dissipate and die out.

=== Typhoon Bang-Lang ===
- Typhoon (JMA)
- Category 1 typhoon (SSHWS)
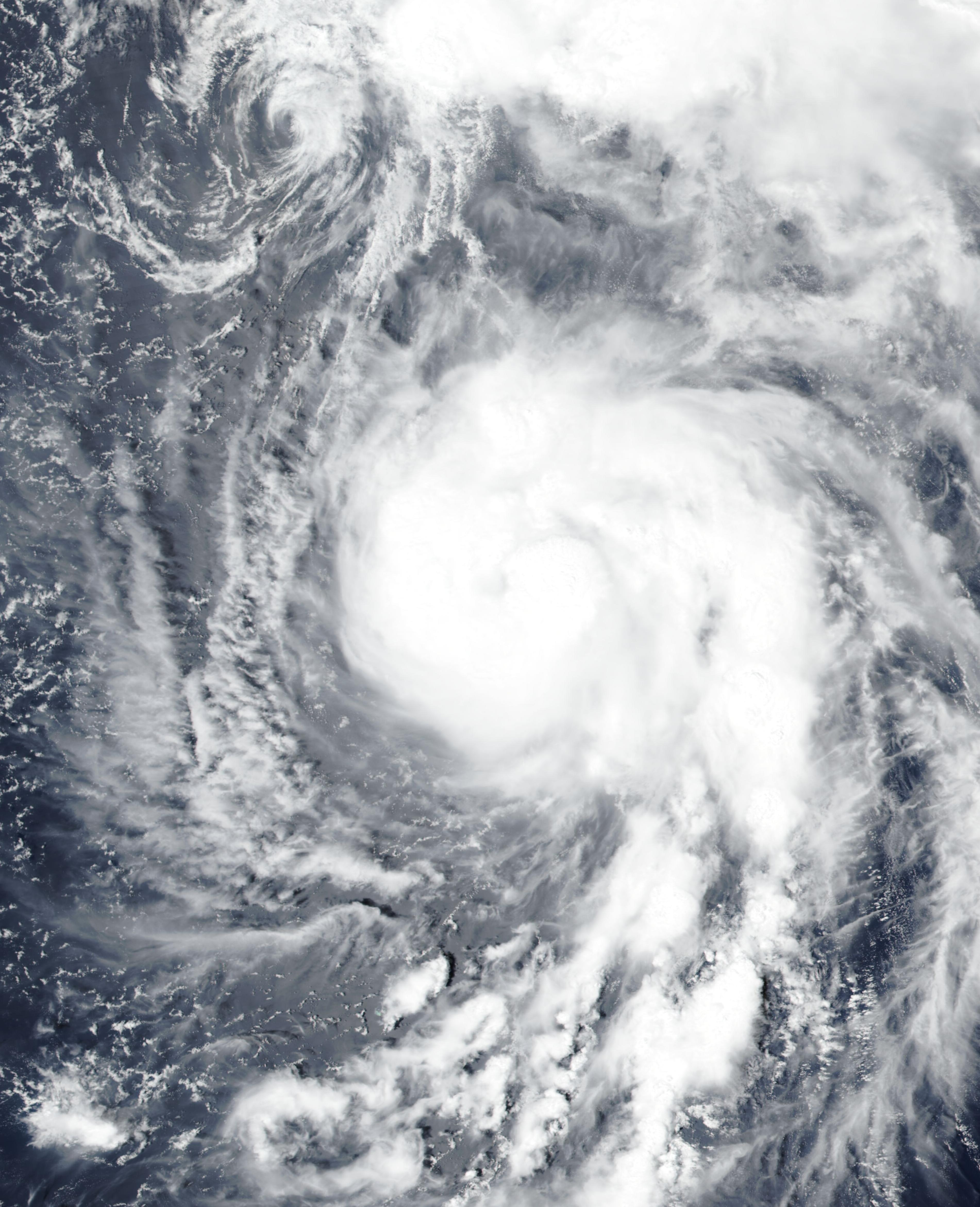
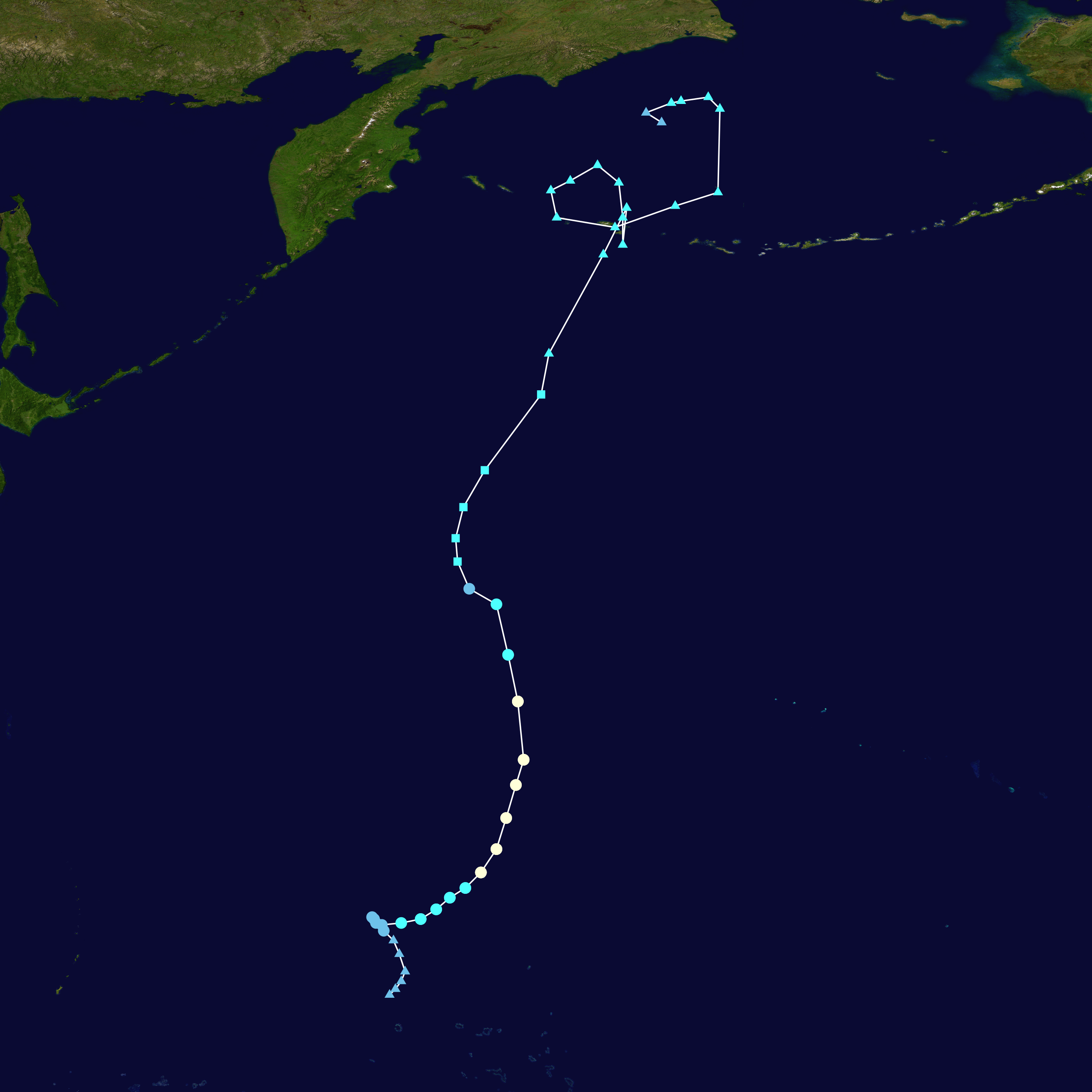
- Duration: August 25 – August 30
- Peak intensity: 120 km/h (75 mph) (10-min); 980 hPa (mbar)

On August 25, the JMA noted that a tropical depression formed near Wake Island. The following day, the JTWC designated the system as a tropical depression, assigning it the designation 20W. On August 27, the JTWC upgraded the system to a tropical storm. The JMA followed suit the next day, upgrading the system to a tropical storm and assigning it the name Bang-Lang. Later that day, the JMA upgraded the system to a severe tropical storm, while the JTWC upgraded the system to a typhoon. The following day on August 29, the JMA followed suit, upgrading the system to a typhoon, though they later downgraded it back to a severe tropical storm that same day. On August 31, the JMA noted that Bang-Lang transitioned into an extratropical cyclone. Later, the JTWC classified the system as a subtropical cyclone.

=== Tropical Storm Etau ===
- Tropical storm (JMA)
- Tropical storm (SSHWS)
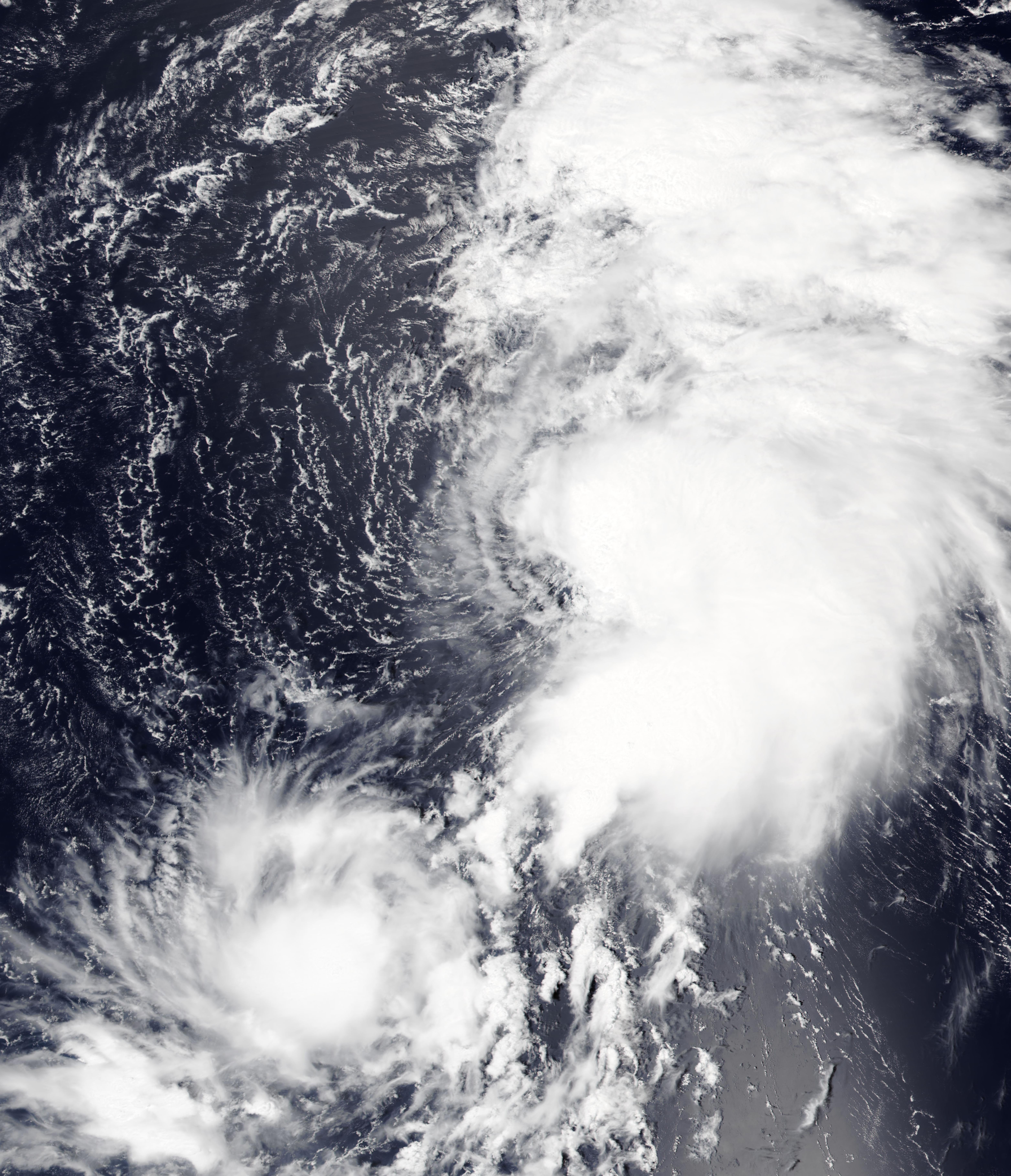
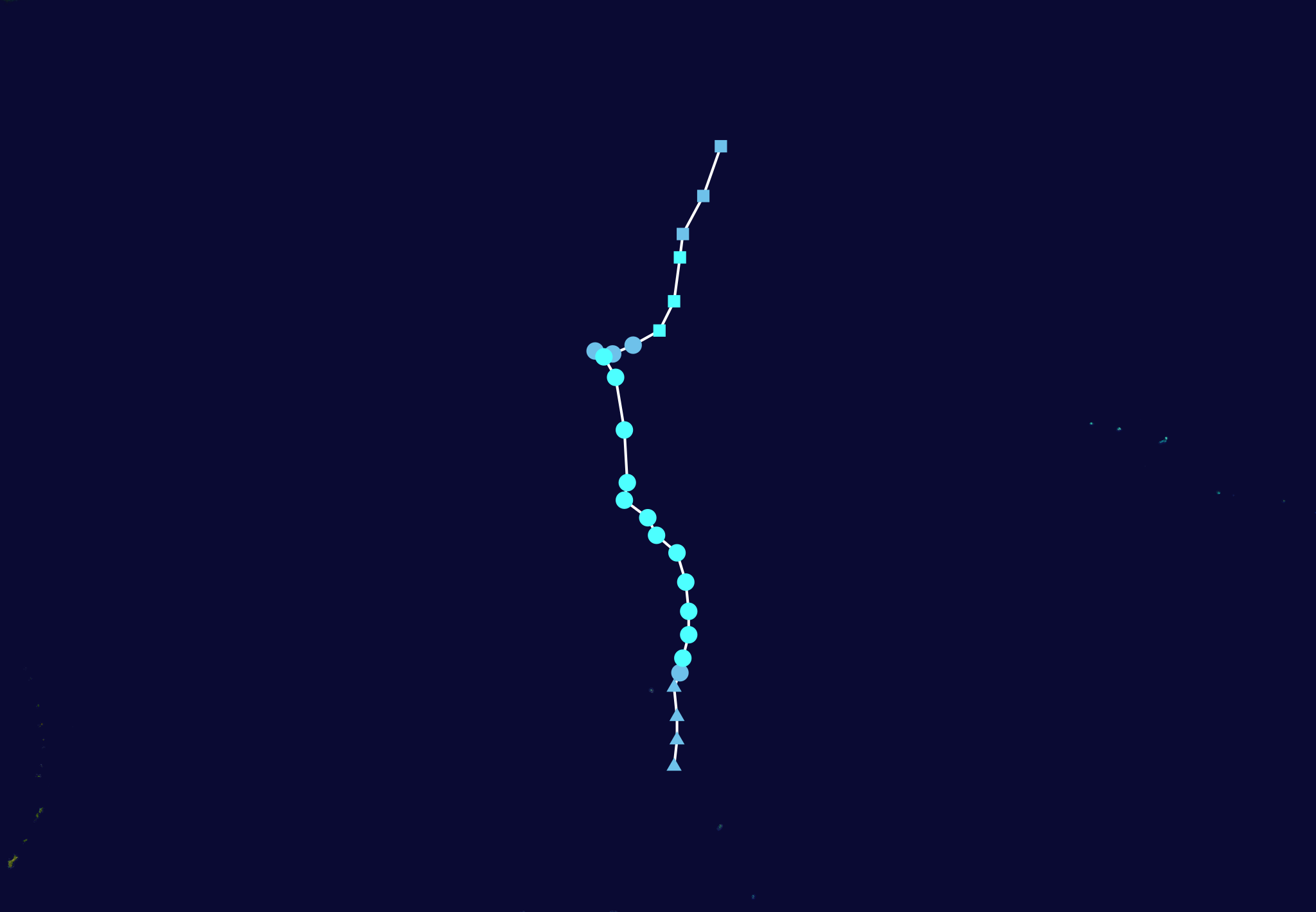
- Duration: August 26 – August 30
- Peak intensity: 75 km/h (45 mph) (10-min); 994 hPa (mbar)

On August 26, the JMA reported that a tropical depression formed near Wake Island. The following day, the JTWC upgraded the system to a tropical depression, assigning it the designation 21W. Later, the JMA and the JTWC upgraded the system to a tropical storm, with the JMA assigning it the name Etau. On the morning of August 30, the JTWC downgraded the system to a tropical depression, with the JMA following suit later that day. On the evening of the following day, the JTWC classified the system as a subtropical storm. On September 1, the JTWC reported that the system dissipated.

=== Tropical Storm Krovanh (Pilandok) ===
- Tropical storm (JMA)
- Tropical storm (SSHWS)
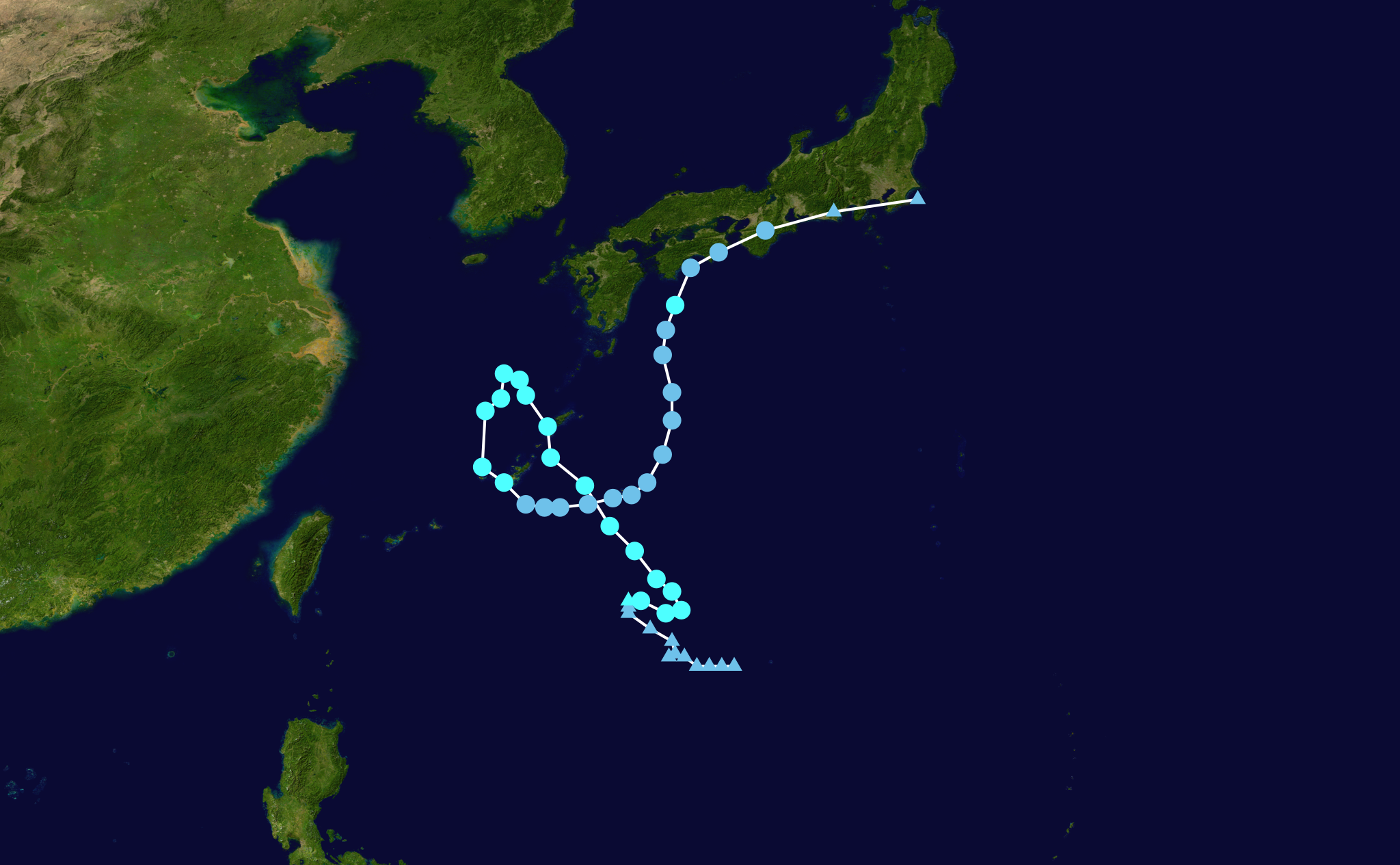
- Duration: August 29 – September 8
- Peak intensity: 85 km/h (50 mph) (10-min); 985 hPa (mbar)

On August 28, PAGASA began monitoring a low-pressure area outside the PAR, assessing that it had a medium chance of development within 24 hours. The following day, PAGASA upgraded its chances of development to high. Later that day, the JTWC recognized the system, stating that it had a medium chance of development. Later, the JMA recognized the system as a tropical depression. On the morning of August 30, PAGASA recognized the system as a tropical depression, assigning it the name Pilandok. Later that day at 07:30 UTC, the JTWC classified it as a monsoon depression. On the morning of September 1, both the JMA and PAGASA upgraded the system to a tropical storm, with the JMA assigning it the name Krovanh. Later that day, the JTWC upgraded this system to a tropical storm, and designated it as 22W. The next day, PAGASA reported that Krovanh exited the PAR. On September 3, Krovanh made landfall over Isen, Kagoshima at 19:00 JST. On September 5, the JTWC downgraded the system to a tropical depression. Two days later on September 7, the JMA followed suit, downgrading the system to a tropical depression. On the morning of September 9, the JMA further downgraded the system to a developing low. The following day, the JTWC reported that the system dissipated.

In Kagoshima Prefecture, both Krovanh and an autumn rain front to the north brought record-breaking rainfall to parts of southwestern Japan. On 5 September, the JMA issued its highest Level 5 emergency landslide warning for Yakushima after the town's Onoaida district recorded an unprecedented 576.5 mm in 48 hours. Krovanh brought strong winds to Jeju, South Korea, causing a crane to topple during port operations and indirectly killing one and seriously injuring another. In China, the storm's broader circulation prompted the National Marine Environmental Forecasting Center to issue an orange storm surge warning, particularly water levels rising by 50–80 cm (20–31 in) along Bohai Bay and 40–80 cm (16–31 in) along Liaodong Bay.

=== September Vietnam Tropical Depression ===
- Tropical depression (JMA)
- Duration: September 11 – September 14
- Peak intensity: <55 km/h (35 mph) (10-min); 1006 hPa (mbar)

On September 11 at 18:00 UTC, the JMA and NCHMF reported that a tropical depression formed east of Vietnam. Later, the JTWC issued a TCFA, citing a high chance of development within 24 hours. However, on September 13, the TCFA was cancelled as the system moved inland over Vietnam.

The depression brought heavy rainfall in Northern and Central Vietnam, some area recorded total rainfall above 500mm such as A Lưới and Rào Trăng in Huế, Tà Si Láng in Lào Cai, Cẩm Liên in Thanh Hoá. Flooding killed four people in Vietnam, 16,000 homes and 22,000 ha rice crop were flooded. In Lào Cai, total damage was estimated at 7.2 billion dong (US$280,000). In Thành Vinh Ward in Thanh Hoá province, total damage was estimated at 39 billion dong (US$1.52 million).

=== Typhoon Dujuan ===
- Typhoon (JMA)
- Category 1 typhoon (SSHWS)
- Duration: September 13 – September 22
- Peak intensity: 140 km/h (85 mph) (10-min); 960 hPa (mbar)

On September 13, the JMA reported that a tropical depression formed between Micronesia and Guam. On September 15, the JTWC upgraded the system to a tropical depression, assigning it the designation 24W. The following day, both the JMA and JTWC upgraded the system to a tropical storm, with the JMA assigning it the name Dujuan. On September 17, the JMA upgraded the system to a severe tropical storm. Later, the JTWC upgraded the system to a category 1 equivalent typhoon. Though on the morning of the following day, they downgraded it back to a tropical storm. Later that day, the JTWC upgraded the system back to typhoon status. The JMA followed suit with the JTWC the following day, upgrading the system to typhoon status. On September 20, the JTWC downgraded the system to a tropical storm. Though they upgraded it back to typhoon status the following day. On September 22, the JMA downgraded Dujuan to a severe tropical storm. Around the same time, both agencies also reported that the system was undergoing extratropical transition. Later that day, the JMA reported that the system transitioned to an extratropical cyclone.

More than 1.6 million people were under evacuation orders as Dujuan affected Japan, with authorities also issuing landslide warnings for parts of Tokyo, Chiba, Kanagawa and Shizuoka prefectures. Four people were killed while six others were reported missing in Kanagawa and Chiba. Agricultural damage in Chiba reached ¥27.4 billion (US$174 million).

=== Typhoon Surigae (Queenie) ===
- Very strong typhoon (JMA)
- Category 4 super typhoon (SSHWS)
- Duration: September 21 – October 1
- Peak intensity: 175 km/h (110 mph) (10-min); 945 hPa (mbar)

On September 20 at 06:00 UTC, the JTWC started monitoring a low pressure area, stating that it had a broad low level with disorganized convection. Later on the evening of that day, the JMA reported that the low pressure area developed to a tropical depression southwest of Guam. On September 22, PAGASA upgraded the system to a tropical depression and began issuing advisories for the system. The following day, the JTWC upgraded the system to a tropical depression, and assigned it the designation 25W. Later that day, the JMA, followed by the JTWC, upgraded the system to a tropical storm, with the JMA assigning it the name Surigae. Later that day at around 23:00 UTC, the system entered the PAR, with PAGASA assigning it the name Queenie. On September 25, both the JMA and PAGASA upgraded the system to a severe tropical storm. The following day, the JTWC upgraded the system to a category 1 equivalent typhoon. Later that day, PAGASA, and later the JMA upgraded the system to a typhoon. On September 27, PAGASA reported that the system exited the PAR. Surigae would eventually reach its peak intensity later that day, with a minimum pressure of 945 hPa and winds of approximately 175 km/h. The following day, the system began to weaken under the influence of dry air. Later that day, the JMA downgraded the system to a severe tropical storm. On September 29, the JMA downgraded the system once more to a tropical storm. On October 1, the JMA reported that the system was undergoing extratropical transition, with the system turning extratropical later that day.

Although the typhoon did not make a direct landfall, the storm still brought gale-force winds up to 75 km/h on Miyagijima and rough 7-meter seas north of the Daito Islands. Surigae also interacted with a stalled autumn rain front as it passed the Izu Islands. This led to heavy rains like Chiba Prefecture east of Tokyo, which already was struggling to recover from previous Typhoon Dujuan. While the storm tracked outside of the Philippine Area of Responsibility at its peak intensity, its atmospheric inflow triggered heavy rainfall that caused notable local flooding particularly around Davao, Visayas, and Mindanao.

=== September Thailand Tropical Depression ===
- Tropical depression (JMA)
- Duration: September 24 – September 25 (exited basin)
- Peak intensity: <55 km/h (35 mph) (10-min); 1006 hPa (mbar)

On the morning of September 24, the JMA reported that a tropical depression formed over Cambodia near Krong Siem Reap. The system exited the basin the following day, and it later regenerated into Deep Depression BOB 07 inland in Myanmar.

The system caused widespread flooding in Bangkok and surrounding areas in Thailand, causing 40 deaths and over $327 million (฿11 billion) in damages.

=== Typhoon Choi-wan ===
- Very strong typhoon (JMA)
- Category 5 super typhoon (SSHWS)
- Duration: September 27 – October 7
- Peak intensity: 175 km/h (110 mph) (10-min); 925 hPa (mbar)

On the evening of September 27, the JMA reported that a tropical depression formed north of Micronesia. Three days later, the JTWC classified the system as Tropical Depression 26W. Later that day, the JMA upgraded it to Tropical Storm Choi-wan Owing to the favourable environment, Choi-wan steadily intensified over the next few days and was classified as a Severe Tropical Storm by the JMA on October 1, and later a typhoon by both agencies on October 2 as it drifted around the northern Mariana Islands. A day later, the JTWC upgraded it into a category 3-equivalent typhoon. The next day it rapidly intensified into a high-end Category 4, and just a few hours later, reached peak intensity as a Category 5 super typhoon with a minimum central pressure of 912 mbar (26.9 inHg), but was later downgraded back down to Category 4 super typhoon, where it would start a quick weakening period. It started rapidly weakening in the next couple of days. On October 7, both the JTWC and the JMA reported it had transitioned into an extratropical cyclone, briefly gaining hurricane force winds where over the course of a few days it would perform a brief loop over the Russian Far East and started moving towards Alaska.

Schools, colleges, and government offices on Saipan and Tinian were closed as a result of the storm. Gusty winds and torrential rainfall resulted in power outages in Saipan. One such outage disrupted a gubernatorial debate in Saipan. The entirety of Tinian lost electricity. On October 5th, after Choi-wan moved away from the Northern Mariana Islands, forecast models showed the remnants of the system becoming a powerful hurricane-force extratropical cyclone and later head towards the Aleutian Islands, with hurricane force wind watches issued for the islands and the surrounding Bering Sea. On October 6, at 3:00 AKDT (11:00 UTC), the watches were upgraded into warnings, which continued into the next day. NWS Anchorage issued a high wind watch at 20:51 AKDT (04:51 UTC the next day) for the Pribilof Islands, and the cities of Atka and Adak, with sustained winds of 40-60 mph and gusts of 80 mph possible in the watch zone. Later, the watches over Shemya were replaced with warnings, with impacts forecasted to be way worse. In Ogasawara Islands, they faced 6–8 m (20–26 ft) high waves, with exceeding 100 millimetres (3.9 in) downpours, and temporary suspension of ferry service Ogasawara Maru.

=== Typhoon Koguma ===
- Very strong typhoon (JMA)
- Category 4 typhoon (SSHWS)
- Duration: October 3 – October 13
- Peak intensity: 165 km/h (105 mph) (10-min); 950 hPa (mbar)

On October 3, the JMA reported that a tropical depression formed near the Marshall Islands. The following day, the JMA upgraded the system to a tropical storm, assigning it the name Koguma. Later on, the JTWC recognized the system as a depression, and assigned it the designation 27W. 6 hours later, the JTWC upgraded the system to a tropical storm. On October 6, the JMA upgraded the system to a severe tropical storm. On October 8, the JMA, followed by the JTWC, upgraded the system to a typhoon. Koguma reached its peak intensity on October 10, with winds of about 165 km/h (105 mph) according to the JMA. On October 11, it begin to weaken and continued to do so until October 13, when it became extratropical. The remnants of Koguma would travel westward for several days before curving southward and eventually back north, where it would move over California on October 20 before dissipating inland.

Koguma brought swells as high as 12.2 metres (40 ft) to the Ogasawara Islands and the Izu archipelago.

=== Typhoon Nolo ===
- Very strong typhoon (JMA)
- Category 3 typhoon (SSHWS)
- Duration: October 4 (entered basin) – October 11
- Peak intensity: 175 km/h (110 mph) (10-min); 950 hPa (mbar)

On October 4, Hurricane Nolo crossed the International Date Line at 180°W, and the Central Pacific Hurricane Center issued its final advisory on the hurricane at 21:00 UTC as it became Typhoon Nolo. At the time, the JMA assessed the typhoon's maximum 10-minute sustained winds at 165 km/h (105 mph) and its central atmospheric pressure at 960 hPa (28.35 inHg), before reporting at 03:00 UTC that its intensity had increased to maximum sustained winds of 175 km/h (110 mph) and a central atmospheric pressure of 950 hPa (28.05 inHg). Later on, the Joint Typhoon Warning Center began issuing advisories, retaining the designation as 15E, at 03:00 UTC. On October 6 at 21:00 UTC, the JTWC reported that Nolo had weakened to minimal typhoon strength, due to onset of strong northeasterly wind shear. On October 7, JMA reported that Nolo had weakened into a severe tropical storm, while the JTWC reported that it had further weakened to tropical-storm-equivalent strength. Nolo's convective structure became increasingly disorganized, with warming cloud tops and deep convection displaced to the west of the low-level circulation center as dry air moved from the north along its western periphery while the storm moved west-northwestward along the southwestern periphery of a mid-level subtropical high. At 06:00 UTC on October 9, the JMA reported that Nolo had weakened further into a tropical storm as it struggled to maintain its intensity, with satellite imagery showing the near-complete dissipation of deep convection despite a tightly wrapped mid-level circulation, scattered areas of deep convection over a well-defined low-level circulation, and stratocumulus cloud lines to the west suggesting that dry air was affecting the system. At 15:00 UTC on October 10, the JTWC issued its final warning on Nolo, noting that the storm had weakened rapidly into a shallow system. At 06:00 UTC on October 11, the JMA downgraded Nolo to a tropical depression as it moved slowly northward along the western side of a mid-level subtropical high, while strong wind shear and dry air continued to weaken the storm. Later that day, at 15:00 UTC, the JTWC reclassified the system as a subtropical depression, with satellite imagery showing a poorly organised low-level circulation centre and convection flaring up to the northeast. At 18:00 UTC, the JMA reported that the system had dissipated, and the JTWC followed suit the following day at 03:00 UTC. After that, JTWC recognized as Subtropical Depression until October 14, when JTWC stop tracking Nolo.

Nolo bring swells to coast Japan from 16.4 feet (5.0 m) up to 21.3 feet (6.5 m) in Izu Islands, resulting in a Level 4 Advisory from the JMA . In Ogasawara Island, the waves were high up to 26 feet (7.9 m) and Minamitorishima Island recorded the waves were up to 12 feet (3.7 m).

=== Typhoon Champi (Rosal) ===
- Violent typhoon (JMA)
- Category 5 super typhoon (SSHWS)
- Duration: October 11 – October 25
- Peak intensity: 215 km/h (130 mph) (10-min); 900 hPa (mbar)

On October 11, the JMA reported that a tropical depression formed near Micronesia. On October 14, the JTWC recognized the system as a depression, assigning it the designation 29W. A day later, the JMA upgraded the system to Tropical Storm Champi. Later that day, the JTWC followed suit and upgraded the system into a tropical storm. On October 16, the JMA upgraded the system into a severe tropical storm. Later that day, the JMA upgraded the system into a typhoon, with the JTWC following suit later that day, saying it had started rapid intensification. Champi then attained one-minute sustained winds of 140 mph (220 km/h) on October 17 as it neared Guam, before becoming a Category 5 equivalent super typhoon with winds of 165 mph (270 km/h). After the initial peak an eyewall replacement cycle occurred temporarily weakening it back to a category 4 before quickly regaining Category 5 status the next day. Later that day, another eyewall replacement cycle would commence, bringing it back down to Category 4 status. On October 20 at 03:00 UTC (11:00 PHT), PAGASA gave the system the local name Rosal while it was still outside the PAR. Later that day, Champi would regain Category 5 status for the third time, with one-minute sustained winds of 185 mph (295 km/h). Lower sea surface temperatures and oceanic heat content weakened it back to Category 4 status on October 21. The system weakened to a category 2-equivalent typhoon on October 23 due to increasing wind shear. However, the system re-intensified into a category 3-equivalent typhoon as it approached the Ryukyu Islands. Typhoon Champi passed within 12 miles of Guam's southern tip on 18 October (local time), ultimately sparing the island from the strongest winds of the cyclone. While the eye's core of extreme winds remained mostly offshore, it was still close enough to cause notable damage to homes and knock down trees on the island. On October 17 at 21:00 UTC (October 18 at 05:00 PHT), PAGASA began issuing advisories for the system in anticipation of its entry to the country's area of responsibility. On October 20 at 03:00 UTC (11:00 PHT), PAGASA issued Signal 1 warnings on Batanes, the eastern portions of the Babuyan islands and mainland Cagayan, and the northeastern portions of Isabela and Catanduanes.

One man died in Liuqiu due to waves caused by Champi, and more than 616 people were injured. In Okinawa, 8400 homes were facing power outages. Champi brought torrential rainfall across South Korea, particularly with 440 mm recorded on Mount Hallasan in Jeju, 147 mm recorded in Busan, and 113 mm recorded in Yeosu. Rainfalls in Shikoku were up to 250 mm and 200 mm in Kyushu and Izu Islands. Champi eyewall pass through very closely to Okinawa & Sakishima Islands (Ishigaki Island & Yonaguni) with record-rainfall and gusts up to 148 kilometres per hour (92 mph) to 198 kilometres per hour (123 mph). In Philippines, Champi generated at least 10 metres (33 ft) waves to east, Batanes and the Babuyan Islands experience outer wind and wave impacts with heavy rain and strong gust. Palawan, the Visayas (specifically Cebu, Negros, and Iloilo) and parts of Mindanao also faced scattered thunderstorms, showers and heavy rain. In Luzon, waves reached high as 4.5 metres (15 ft) off northern and eastern Catanduanes, and up to 4 metres (13 ft) off in Isabela, Batanes, the Babuyan Islands, Cagayan and Camarines.

=== Typhoon In-fa ===
- Very strong typhoon (JMA)
- Category 4 super typhoon (SSHWS)
- Duration: October 22 – November 5
- Peak intensity: 185 km/h (115 mph) (10-min); 940 hPa (mbar)

On October 22, the JMA reported that a tropical depression had formed near the Marshall Islands. The JTWC cited a medium chance of formation within the next 24 hours that same day. A day later, the JTWC upgraded its chances to high. Later that day, the JTWC upgraded the system into a tropical depression, assigned it the designation 30W. A few hours later, both the JTWC and JMA upgraded the system into a tropical storm, with the JMA assigning it the name In-fa. In October 25, In-fa officially reached typhoon strength. The next day, In-fa underwent a stage of rapid intensification, and reached category 4-equivalent typhoon. The storm remained quasi-stationary, and weakened to a category 3-equivalent typhoon due to oceanic upwelling. However, as the storm moved west, In-fa continued to gradually intensify and acquired characteristics of an annular tropical cyclone. On October 28, In-fa reached super typhoon strength as it continued moving westwards. Later, the typhoon weakened back into a category 4-equivalent typhoon due to moderate northeasterly winds. On October 29, In-fa regained super typhoon strength, with winds reaching 240 km/h (150 mph). On October 30, In-fa passed through Agrihan, Pagan and Alamagan. On November 2, In-fa downgraded to Severe Tropical Storm before JMA upgraded back to Typhoon status. On November 6, JMA confirmed that In-fa have went through extratropical transition and JTWC made the final advisory of the system before it became a extratropical cyclone.

In-fa brought high winds, swells, gust force to Ogasawara Island, Chichijima and Hahajima Iwo To, Izu Island and the Pacific coast of Honshu. Ferry and marine services to the remote islands experienced transport disruption.

=== Typhoon Cempaka (Samuel) ===
- Very strong typhoon (JMA)
- Category 2 typhoon (SSHWS)
- Duration: November 5 – November 11
- Peak intensity: 155 km/h (100 mph) (10-min); 955 hPa (mbar)

On November 5, the JMA reported that a tropical depression formed northeast of the Northern Mariana Islands. The depression formed out of a disturbance partially related to the remnants of Tropical Storm Olana from the eastern Pacific basin. The following day, the JTWC upgraded the system into a tropical depression, assigning it the designation 31W. 31W passed through Agrihan, Alamagan and Pagan on November 6. On November 7, both the JMA and JTWC upgraded the system to a tropical storm, with the JMA assigning it the name Cempaka. At 18:00 UTC the same day, the JMA upgraded Cempaka to a severe tropical storm. On November 8, the JTWC upgraded the system into a typhoon. A few hours later, the JMA followed suit and upgraded the system into a typhoon. On November 9 at 08:40 PHT (00:40 UTC), PAGASA assigned the system the name Samuel as it entered the PAR. On November 10, Cempaka reached its peak intensity with 10 minute sustained winds of 155 kph (100 mph) and a pressure of 955 hPa according to the JMA. Later, the system started to slowly weaken due to hostile wind shear, low sea surface temperatures, and dry air infiltration.

=== Other systems ===
- On March 10, the JMA identified a tropical depression located over 1,300 km (810 mi) east-northeast of Tropical Storm Nuri. The following day, a developing frontal system absorbed the depression.
- On May 8, the JMA noted that a tropical depression formed around 1,900 km (1,200 mi) to the east of Tropical Storm Hagupit. The next day, the depression degenerated into a remnant low-pressure system.
- On June 3, the JMA noted that a tropical depression had formed in the South China Sea. On the next day, it was named Ester by PAGASA. The JTWC analyzed the system as a subtropical depression before doing a landfall in Taiwan, dissipating on June 6 as the depression lost structure after landfall.
- On June 9, the JMA noted that a tropical depression had formed near the Pearl River Delta. The system was absorbed into a frontal boundary the following day.
- On July 14, PAGASA reported that a tropical depression formed outside the Philippine Area of Responsibility near the Pearl River Delta. The system was downgraded to a remnant low-pressure area six hours later and dissipated completely over land the next day.
- On July 15, the JTWC began tracking a disturbance east-southeast of Micronesia. The following day, the JMA designated it as a tropical depression. However, due to its poorly organized cyclonic circulation, it was downgraded into a remnant low on July 17 despite being in a favorable environment.
- On July 16, the JTWC marked a subtropical depression east of Japan and designated it Invest 91W. However, the JMA only classified the system as a low-pressure area, and it dissipated after two days.
- On August 7, the National Center for Hydro-Meteorological Forecasting of Vietnam reported that a low-pressure area over the Gulf of Tonkin has strengthened into a tropical depression. The Hong Kong Observatory also followed suit the following day. Meanwhile, the JTWC assessed the likelihood of tropical cyclone formation to medium, but downgraded it to low on August 8, while HKO and NCHMF both reported the system was degenerated into a low pressure area in the same day.
  Tropical Depression 15W active on August 10
- On August 8, PAGASA reported that a low pressure area outside of the PAR had formed 2,600 km (1,600 mi) east of northern Luzon. Later that day, the agency stated the low had developed into a tropical depression, while the JMA had only recognized it as a low pressure area. Later that day, the JTWC cited that the system had a medium chance of becoming a tropical cyclone within 24 hours. The next day, the JMA upgraded the system to a tropical depression. On August 10, the JTWC classified the system as Tropical Depression 15W, with warnings being issued around the same time. The system was short-lived, dissipating on August 11 without impacting any land areas.
- On August 13, the JMA noted that a tropical depression formed to the southwest of Tropical Storm Nangka. The JMA stopped tracking the system as the system dissipated on August 16.
- On August 28, the JTWC marked the remnants of Hurricane Lala from the Central Pacific as a subtropical storm. The JMA classified the system as a non-tropical low. The JTWC reported that the system dissipated on the morning of August 30.
- On August 30, the JMA reported that a tropical depression formed southeast of Hong Kong. At the same time, PAGASA recognized the system as a low-pressure area, with a medium chance of development. The JTWC later recognized the system, assigning it a medium chance of development. The JMA ceased tracking the system the following day.
- Tropical Depression 23W active on September 4
  On September 3, the JMA reported that a tropical depression formed east of the Philippines. Later, the JTWC recognized the system as a tropical storm, assigning it the designation 23W, though they later downgraded it to a tropical depression.On the evening of September 21, the JMA reported that a tropical depression formed south of Wake Island. The system degenerated into a low pressure area the following day.

Tropical Depression 28W active on October 12

- On October 10, the JMA reported that a tropical depression formed near Guam and the Northern Mariana Islands. The following day, the JTWC issued a TCFA for the depression, citing a high chance of development. On October 12, the JTWC upgraded the disturbance to a depression, and designated it 28W. 28W dissipated on October 15 without any warning issued by JMA.
- Tropical Depression Olana active on October 25
  On October 21, the National Hurricane Center (NHC) noted a disturbance near the International Date Line. On October 24, the JMA began tracking the system as a low pressure area. The following day, the JMA marked it as a tropical depression. Later on October 25, the system entered the Central Pacific, where it quickly developed into Tropical Storm Olana.
- At 18:00 UTC on November 13, the JMA reported a tropical depression had formed near the International Date Line, associated with the remnants of Tropical Storm Pena. The system later dissipated on November 14.

== Storm names ==
Within the northwest Pacific Ocean, both the JMA and PAGASA assign names to tropical cyclones that develop in the region, which can result in a tropical cyclone having two names. The JMA's RSMC Tokyo–Typhoon Center assigns international names to tropical cyclones on behalf of the World Meteorological Organization's Typhoon Committee should they be judged to have 10-minute sustained wind speeds of 65 km/h (40 mph). PAGASA names tropical cyclones which move into or form as a tropical depression in their PAR, located between 135°E and 115°E and between 5°N and 25°N, even if the cyclone has had an international name assigned to it. Should the list of names for the region be exhausted, then names will be taken from an auxiliary list, the first ten of which are published each season. Unused names are marked in gray. The names of significant tropical cyclones will be retired by both PAGASA and the Typhoon Committee in the spring of 2027.

=== International names ===
A tropical cyclone is assigned a name once it reaches 10-minute sustained wind speeds of 65 km/h (40 mph). The JMA selects the names from a list of 140 contributed by the 14 member nations and territories of the ESCAP/WMO Typhoon Committee. Retired names, if any, will be announced by the WMO in 2027, with replacement names to be announced in 2028. The next 36 names on the naming list are shown below, along with their international numeric designations if they are used. All the names in the list are the same, except for Nokaen, Penha, Peilou, Narra, Gaenari, and Bang-Lang, which replaced Phanfone, Vongfong, Linfa, Molave, Goni, and Vamco after the 2019 and 2020 seasons. These six names were used for the first time this season.

- Nokaen (2601)
- Penha (2602)
- Nuri (2603)
- Sinlaku (2604)
- Hagupit (2605)
- Jangmi (2606)
- Mekkhala (2607)
- Higos (2608)
- Bavi (2609)
- Maysak (2610)
- Haishen (2611)
- Noul (2612)
- Dolphin (2613)
- Kujira (2614)
- Chan-hom (2615)
- Peilou (2616)
- Nangka (2617)
- Saudel (2618)
- Narra (2619)
- Gaenari (2620)
- Atsani (2621)
- Etau (2622)
- Bang-Lang (2623)
- Krovanh (2624)
- Dujuan (2625)
- Surigae (2626)
- Choi-wan (2627)
- Koguma (2629)
- Champi (2630)
- In-fa (2631)
- Cempaka (2632)
- Nepartak (unused)
- Lupit (unused)
- Mirinae (unused)
- Nida (unused)
- Omais (unused)

Additionally, Nolo (2628) entered the Western Pacific basin from the Central Pacific basin after crossing the International Date Line (180°E) as a tropical cyclone. As the system crossed between basins intact, it retained the name assigned to it by the National Hurricane Center.

=== Philippines ===
PAGASA uses its own naming scheme for tropical cyclones that develop within or enter their self-defined area of responsibility. During this season, PAGASA uses the following list of names, which was last used during 2022 and is scheduled to be used again in 2030, with replacements for any retired names. All of the names are the same except Ada, Francisco, Kiyapo, and Pilandok, which replaced the names Agaton, Florita, Karding, and Paeng after they were retired. These four names were used for the first time this season.

- Ada (2601)
- Basyang (2602)
- Caloy (2605)
- Domeng (2606)
- Ester
- Francisco (2607)
- Gardo (2608)
- Henry (2610)
- Inday (2609)
- Josie (2611)
- Kiyapo (2612)
- Luis (2614)
- Maymay (2614)
- Neneng (2620)
- Obet (2618)
- Pilandok (2624)
- Queenie (2626)
- Rosal (2630)
- Samuel (2632)
- Tomas (unused)
- Umberto (unused)
- Venus (unused)
- Waldo (unused)
- Yayang (unused)
- Zeny (unused)

== Season effects ==
This table summarizes all official tropical systems that developed within or moved into the Western Pacific basin during 2026, defined as the region west of the 180th meridian. It also provides an overview of each system's intensity, duration, affected land areas, and any associated deaths or damage.

Name	Dates	Peak intensity			Areas affected	Damage (USD)	Deaths	Ref(s).
Name	Dates	Category	Wind speed	Pressure	Areas affected	Damage (USD)	Deaths	Ref(s).
Nokaen (Ada)	January 13–22	Tropical storm	75 km/h (45 mph)	996 hPa (29.41 inHg)	Palau, Caroline Islands, Philippines	$24,000	2	
Penha (Basyang)	February 3–7	Tropical storm	65 km/h (40 mph)	1002 hPa (29.59 inHg)	Caroline Islands, Philippines	$25.5 million	12	
Nuri	March 10–12	Tropical storm	65 km/h (40 mph)	998 hPa (29.47 inHg)	Mariana Islands, Caroline Islands	None	None	
TD	March 10–11	Tropical depression	Not specified	1004 hPa (29.65 inHg)	Mariana Islands	None	None	
Sinlaku	April 7–19	Violent typhoon	215 km/h (130 mph)	905 hPa (26.72 inHg)	Micronesia, Mariana Islands, Bonin Islands, Papua New Guinea	>$1.55 billion	17	
Hagupit (Caloy)	May 4–19	Tropical storm	65 km/h (40 mph)	1002 hPa (29.59 inHg)	Caroline Islands	Minimal	None	
TD	May 8–9	Tropical depression	Not specified	1006 hPa (29.71 inHg)	Micronesia	None	None	
Jangmi (Domeng)	May 26–June 3	Severe tropical storm	110 km/h (70 mph)	970 hPa (28.64 inHg)	Caroline Islands, Philippines, Japan	>$3.1 million	None	
Ester	June 3–6	Tropical depression	55 km/h (35 mph)	1002 hPa (29.59 inHg)	Vietnam, Philippines, Taiwan, Japan	Minimal	None	
TD	June 9–10	Tropical depression	Not specified	1002 hPa (29.59 inHg)	South China, Taiwan, Japan (particularly Ryukyu Islands)	Minimal	None	
Mekkhala (Francisco)	June 18–27	Very strong typhoon	185 km/h (115 mph)	925 hPa (27.32 inHg)	Marshall Islands, Caroline Islands, Mariana Islands, Philippines, Taiwan, Japan, Kuril Islands	>$20.2 million	10	
Higos (Gardo)	June 21–26	Severe tropical storm	95 km/h (60 mph)	996 hPa (29.41 inHg)	Mariana Islands, Philippines, Japan, Kuril Islands	Unknown	None	
Bavi (Inday)	June 30–July 15	Violent typhoon	215 km/h (130 mph)	900 hPa (26.58 inHg)	Marshall Islands, Caroline Islands, Mariana Islands, Philippines, Japan (particularly Ryukyu Islands, Hokkaido), Taiwan, Eastern China, Northern China, Korea, Russian Far East	>$141 million	23	
Maysak (Henry)	June 30–July 7	Severe tropical storm	95 km/h (60 mph)	985 hPa (29.09 inHg)	Philippines, Vietnam, Laos, Cambodia, Thailand, Southern China, Central China	>$3.35 billion	171	
Haishen (Josie)	July 12–13	Tropical storm	65 km/h (40 mph)	1004 hPa (29.65 inHg)	Marshall Islands, Caroline Islands	Minimal	None	
TD	July 16–17	Tropical depression	55 km/h (35 mph)	1006 hPa (29.71 inHg)	Micronesia	None	None	
Noul (Kiyapo)	July 22–27	Typhoon	130 km/h (80 mph)	965 hPa (28.50 inHg)	Micronesia, Philippines, Taiwan, Southern China	>$639 million	14+	
Dolphin	July 26–August 12	Violent typhoon	205 km/h (125 mph)	915 hPa (27.02 inHg)	Marshall Islands, Japan (particularly Minamitorishima, Bonin Islands, Daitō Islands, Ryukyu Islands, Kyushu), Taiwan, East China, Philippines, Central China	>$4.12 billion	(6)	
Kujira (Luis–Maymay)	July 30–August 6	Tropical storm	75 km/h (45 mph)	994 hPa (29.35 inHg)	Micronesia, Philippines	>$63.9 million	7	
Chan-hom	August 5–15	Severe tropical storm	95 km/h (60 mph)	980 hPa (28.94 inHg)	Wake Island, Japan (particularly Honshu), Korea, Russian Far East	Unknown	None	
Peilou	August 8–13	Tropical storm	75 km/h (45 mph)	996 hPa (29.41 inHg)	Mariana Islands, Japan (particularly Minamitorishima), Alaska Peninsula	Minimal	None	
15W	August 9–11	Tropical depression	55 km/h (35 mph)	996 hPa (29.41 inHg)	None	None	None	
Nangka	August 11–16	Tropical storm	75 km/h (45 mph)	990 hPa (29.23 inHg)	Mariana Islands, Japan (particularly Minamitorishima)	None	None	
TD	August 13–16	Tropical depression	Not specified	1000 hPa (29.53 inHg)	Japan (particularly Bonin Islands)	None	None	
Saudel (Obet)	August 15–September 4	Very strong typhoon	165 km/h (105 mph)	940 hPa (27.76 inHg)	Marshall Islands, Micronesia, Mariana Islands, Japan (particularly Bonin Islands, Daitō Islands, Ryukyu Islands), Taiwan, Philippines, East China, Southern China	>$104 million	20+	
Narra	August 17–27	Tropical storm	75 km/h (45 mph)	990 hPa (29.23 inHg)	Taiwan, Philippines, Southern China, Vietnam, Laos, Thailand, Cambodia	Unknown	3 (5)	
Gaenari (Neneng)	August 18–25	Tropical storm	65 km/h (40 mph)	996 hPa (29.41 inHg)	Philippines, Taiwan, Japan (particularly Ryukyu Islands), East China	>$18.4 million	2+	
Atsani	August 22–26	Tropical storm	65 km/h (40 mph)	998 hPa (29.47 inHg)	Micronesia	None	None	
Bang-Lang	August 25–30	Typhoon	120 km/h (75 mph)	980 hPa (28.94 inHg)	Wake Island, Aleutian Islands	None	None	
Etau	August 26–30	Tropical storm	75 km/h (45 mph)	994 hPa (29.35 inHg)	Wake Island, Aleutian Islands	None	None	
Krovanh (Pilandok)	August 29–September 8	Tropical storm	85 km/h (50 mph)	985 hPa (29.09 inHg)	Philippines, Japan (particularly Ryukyu Islands, Kyushu, Shikoku, Honshu), South Korea, Coastal East China, Coastal Northeast China	Unknown	(1)	
TD	August 30–31	Tropical depression	55 km/h (35 mph)	996 hPa (29.41 inHg)	Southern China, Taiwan	None	None	
23W	September 3–5	Tropical depression	55 km/h (35 mph)	998 hPa (29.47 inHg)	Japan (particularly Kyushu, Ryukyu Islands)	None	None	
Vietnam Depression	September 11–14	Tropical depression	Not specified	1006 hPa (29.71 inHg)	Vietnam, Southern China, Laos, Cambodia, Thailand	$1.8 million	4	
Dujuan	September 13–22	Typhoon	140 km/h (85 mph)	960 hPa (28.35 inHg)	Mariana Islands, Japan (particularly Bonin Islands, Honshu)	>$174 million	14	
Surigae (Queenie)	September 21–October 1	Very strong typhoon	175 km/h (110 mph)	945 hPa (27.91 inHg)	Mariana Islands, Japan (particularly Ryukyu Islands, Daitō Islands, Izu Islands, Kantō region), Kamchatka Peninsula, Alaska Peninsula	Unknown	None	
TD	September 21–22	Tropical depression	55 km/h (35 mph)	1006 hPa (29.71 inHg)	None	None	None	
Thailand Depression	September 24–25	Tropical depression	Not specified	1006 hPa (29.71 inHg)	Vietnam, Laos, Cambodia, Thailand	>$367 million	40	
Choi-wan	September 27–October 7	Very strong typhoon	175 km/h (110 mph)	925 hPa (27.32 inHg)	Mariana Islands, Japan (particularly Bonin Islands, Coastal Honshu), Kamchatka Peninsula, Alaska Peninsula	Unknown	None	
Koguma	October 3–13	Very strong typhoon	165 km/h (105 mph)	950 hPa (28.05 inHg)	Marshall Islands	None	None	
Nolo	October 4–11	Very strong typhoon	175 km/h (110 mph)	950 hPa (28.05 inHg)	None (after crossover)	None	None	
28W	October 10–15	Tropical depression	Not specified	1006 hPa (29.71 inHg)	Mariana Islands	Minimal	None	
Champi (Rosal)	October 11–25	Violent typhoon	215 km/h (130 mph)	900 hPa (26.58 inHg)	Micronesia, Mariana Islands, Philippines, Japan (particularly Ryukyu Islands, Kyushu, Shikoku, Honshu), Taiwan, Eastern China, South Korea	>$32.2 million	1+	
In-fa	October 22–November 5	Very strong typhoon	185 km/h (115 mph)	940 hPa (27.76 inHg)	Marshall Islands, Mariana Islands, Japan (particularly Bonin Islands)	Unknown	None	
Olana	October 25	Tropical depression	Not specified	1008 hPa (29.77 inHg)	None	None	None	
Cempaka (Samuel)	November 5–11	Very strong typhoon	155 km/h (100 mph)	955 hPa (28.20 inHg)	Mariana Islands, Japan (particularly Bonin Islands)	Minimal	None	
TD	November 13–14	Tropical depression	Not specified	1008 hPa (29.77 inHg)	None	None	None	
Season aggregates
46 systems	January 13 – Season ongoing		215 km/h (130 mph)	900 hPa (26.58 inHg)		>$10.6 billion	340+ (12)	

== See also ==
- Weather of 2026
- Tropical cyclones in 2026
- Pacific typhoon season
- 2026 Atlantic hurricane season
- 2026 Pacific hurricane season
- 2026 North Indian Ocean cyclone season
- South-West Indian Ocean cyclone seasons: 2025–26, 2026–27
- Australian region cyclone seasons: 2025–26, 2026–27
- South Pacific cyclone seasons: 2025–26, 2026–27
