= Storm Samuel =

Mediterranean tropical-like cyclone in 2026

Storm Samuel (Jolina)
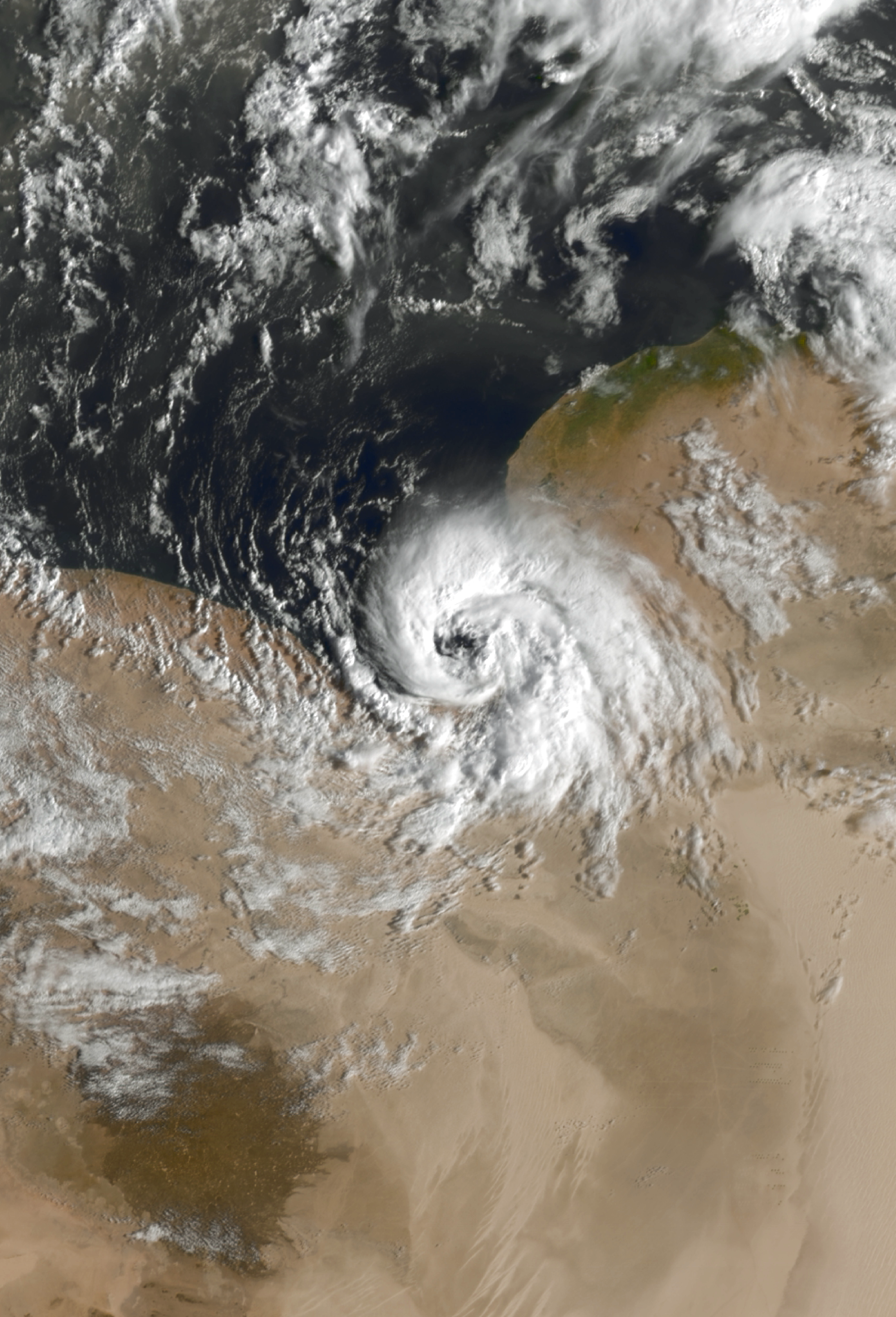
- Storm Samuel near peak intensity whilst making landfall in Libya on 18 March

Meteorological history
- Formed: 17 March 2026
- Dissipated: 19 March 2026

Subtropical storm
- 1-minute sustained (SSHWS)
- Highest winds: 80 km/h (50 mph)
- Highest gusts: 85 km/h (55 mph) recorded at Tripoli
- Lowest pressure: 993 hPa (mbar); 29.32 inHg

Overall effects
- Fatalities: 1
- Injuries: 4
- Damage: >€1 million
- Areas affected: Spain, Italy (especially Calabria), Libya, Egypt
- Part of the 2025–26 European windstorm season

Storm Samuel, also known as Medicane Samuel, Cyclone Samuel, or known as Storm Jolina in Germany, was a rare March Mediterranean tropical-like cyclone (medicane) that impacted the Central Mediterranean in March 2026, after the First March medicane. The storm was first identified as a cold-core extratropical cyclone and, on 15 March, was named Samuel by National Meteorological Service of Andorra. On 17 March, the FUB gave the storm the name Jolina. That same day, the system transitioned into a medicane before eventually dissipating on 19 March after making landfall in Libya.

== Meteorological history ==
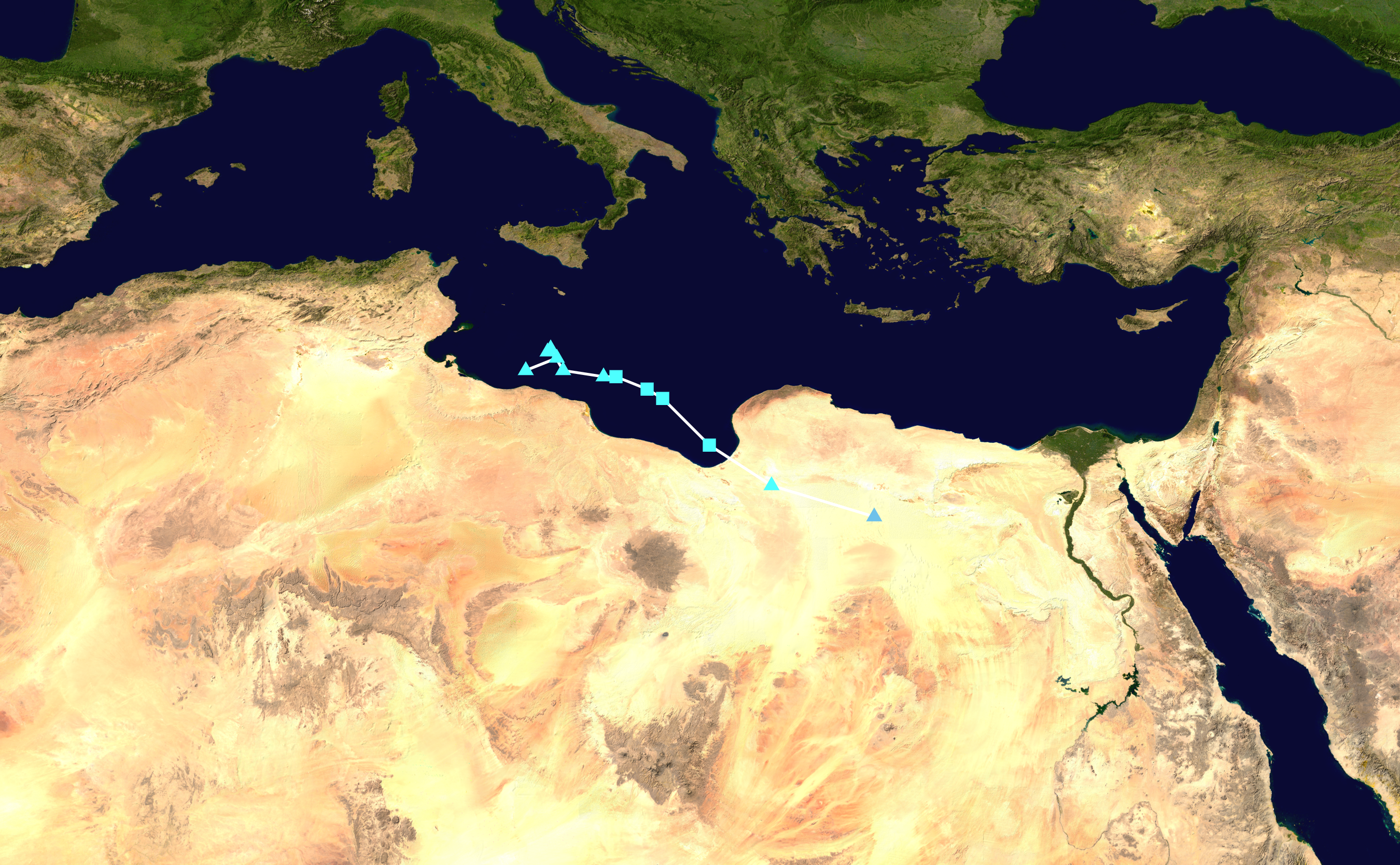
Map plotting the storm's track and intensity, according to the Saffir–Simpson scale Map key Saffir–Simpson scale Tropical depression (≤38 mph, ≤62 km/h) Tropical storm (39–73 mph, 63–118 km/h) Category 1 (74–95 mph, 119–153 km/h) Category 2 (96–110 mph, 154–177 km/h) Category 3 (111–129 mph, 178–208 km/h) Category 4 (130–156 mph, 209–251 km/h) Category 5 (≥157 mph, ≥252 km/h) Unknown Storm type Tropical cyclone Subtropical cyclone Extratropical cyclone, remnant low, tropical disturbance, or monsoon depression

Early on 14 March, an elongated cold front of a large North Atlantic extratropical low underwent leeward cyclogenesis as it was located near the Pyrenees. The next day, the new low was named Samuel by the National Meteorological Service of Andorra before being tracked by AEMET. The frontal low slowly meandered eastwards in the central Mediterranean, gaining the name Jolina from FUB. As the frontal zone of Samuel reached the western Central Mediterranean Sea, a secondary low pressure center formed south of Sicily, quickly becoming the dominant center as it deepened for several hours.

RGB water vapor loop of Storm Samuel traversing the Central Mediterranean Sea during the middle of March.

Microwave soundings and ECMWF model temperature distribution plots began to observe a gradual warm-core occlusion process taking place, transitioning from a cold-core to warm-core system as the scattered convective cluster began decaying from its nearby frontal boundaries, thunderstorm activity followed suit through strong dynamical forcing as Samuel embedded under a pocket of upper-level cold air aloft. ASCAT and Synthetic Aperture Radar (SAR) data began to observe a formative eye-like structure as Samuel became stationed over 17°C sea surface temperatures (SSTs) and was located in a low shear environment late on 17 March where it gained subtropical characteristics, Samuel underwent a quick organization phase shortly before landfall developing a strong curved band signature that wrapped around the cyclone’s center.

Samuel made landfall near Brega, Libya at 08:00 UTC on 18 March, quickly weakening inland as it moved over the desert area, degenerating into a low pressure area and then dissipating near the Egyptian border on 19 March. Prior to landfall, a 20:30 UTC ASCAT-C pass on the 16th recorded 1-minute sustained winds of 75–80 kilometres per hour (45–50 mph), it further organized shortly after the warm-core occlusion and maintained its 50 mph intensity at landfall.

== Impact ==
=== Spain ===
During its initial phase, Samuel produced strong wind gusts across numerous areas of Spain, with the strongest recorded being 160 kilometres per hour (100 mph) near Barcelona and Girona province. Wave heights near Puertos del Estado reached 13 metres (43 ft). These strong winds and rough seas caused power outages across states such as Catalonia, Basque Country, and Galicia. Gusts reached up to 140 kilometres per hour (85 mph) in some locations of Catalonia. Four people were injured in Spain due to the impacts related to Storm Samuel.

=== Italy ===
While meandering in the Central Mediterranean, Samuel caused significant damage across Southern Italy, particularly in the region of Calabria where gale-force winds, prolonged heavy rainfall, and localized hailstorms led to landslides and widespread flooding. Unofficial reports mention Calabria received over 220 millimetres (8.7 in) of rain in just 24 hours on 17 March. School closures as a result from orange alerts were in effect across much of the country, rainfall continued along surrounding regions of Italy such as Sicily and Basilicata leading to further traffic disruptions. At least 80 people in Cosenza had to be evacuated where impacts were most significant due to rockslides.

=== Libya ===
Upon landfall on 18 March, Samuel brought moderate to heavy rains and wind gusts exceeding 90 kilometres per hour (55 mph), causing significant flooding in and around the surrounding areas of Tripoli, stranding vehicles and individuals. Satellite analysis confirmed a massive dust advection pulled from the Sahara into the Mediterranean by the storm's intense circulation. One person died while rescuing people stuck in floodwaters in Tajoura.

=== Egypt ===
As the remnants of Samuel persisted inland Egypt on 18 March, lingering thunderstorms brought accompanying lightning and strong winds gusting to around 60–70 km/h (35–45 mph). Visibility was reduced to less than 1,000 meters (3,820 ft) in some areas from Saharan dust, and heavy rainfall that posed a flash flood threat across much of the Sinai peninsula and Upper Egypt. Maritime conditions and navigation were disrupted off the Mediterranean coast with wave heights reaching 2.5–3 m (8–10 ft). However, no major damage was recorded.

== See also ==
- Mediterranean tropical-like cyclone
- List of Mediterranean tropical-like cyclones
- Tropical cyclones in 2026
- 2025–26 European windstorm season
- Storm Daniel – Catastrophic tropical cyclone that affected similar areas in Libya
