= Hurricane Simon =

Eastern Pacific hurricane in 2026

- Simon near its peak intensity late on October 10

Meteorological history
- Formed: October 7, 2026
- Dissipated: October 16, 2026

Category 4 major hurricane
- 1-minute sustained (SSHWS/NWS)
- Highest winds: 155 mph (250 km/h)
- Lowest pressure: 928 mbar (hPa); 27.40 inHg

Overall effects
- Fatalities: 5 total
- Injuries: 2
- Damage: >$10 million (2026 USD)
- Areas affected: Southwestern Mexico
- Part of the 2026 Pacific hurricane season

Hurricane Simon was a powerful and erratic tropical cyclone that brushed the coast of Southwestern Mexico. The twenty-first named storm, eleventh hurricane, and ninth major hurricane of the extremely active 2026 Pacific hurricane season, Simon formed on October 7 from an area of low pressure south of Mexico.

== Meteorological history ==
Map plotting the storm's track and intensity, according to the Saffir–Simpson scale Map key Saffir–Simpson scale Tropical depression (≤38 mph, ≤62 km/h) Tropical storm (39–73 mph, 63–118 km/h) Category 1 (74–95 mph, 119–153 km/h) Category 2 (96–110 mph, 154–177 km/h) Category 3 (111–129 mph, 178–208 km/h) Category 4 (130–156 mph, 209–251 km/h) Category 5 (≥157 mph, ≥252 km/h) Unknown Storm type Tropical cyclone Subtropical cyclone Extratropical cyclone, remnant low, tropical disturbance, or monsoon depression

On October 3, the National Hurricane Center designated a low-pressure area near the coast of Mexico and Guatemala, stating that it had a 90% chance of development in the next seven days. On October 7, the NHC upgraded the disturbance to a tropical depression, designating it as Twenty-E at 15:00 UTC. At 21:00 UTC the same day, as it was moving northwest, the NHC upgraded the depression into Tropical Storm Simon. The system organized and strengthened over the next day before being upgraded to a hurricane at 03:00 UTC on October 9. However the storm started to move very slowly. The storm continued strengthening and was upgraded to a Category 2 by the NHC. The next day, it rapidly intensified into a Category 3, and later Category 4 major hurricane, while starting to speed up a bit. Its rapid intensification period stopped after that, and started to slowly intensify up to its peak at 06:00 UTC the next day with maximum sustained winds of 155 miles per hour (249 km/h) and a minimum central pressure of 928 mbar (27.4 inHg). After that it started a gradual weakening period as a result of interacting with rugged terrain. The next day it weakened down to a Category 3 major hurricane, and later that day it weakened further into a Category 2. On October 13, a partial scatterometer pass indicated that Simon’s gale-force maximum wind extent only extended out to 30 nautical miles (35 mi), the NHC noted it as a "very small hurricane" as it maintained intensity.

== Preparations ==
Three tropical cyclones active on October 9: Rachel (left), Simon (bottom), and Isaias (top right)

On October 8, the National Hurricane Center issued a hurricane watch for the Pacific Coast of Mexico from Manzanillo to Punta Mita. Later that day the watches were upgraded to hurricane warnings, with additional tropical storm watches issued around the area. Jalisco Civil Protection ordered all tourist sites to shelter visitors and staff by the afternoon of October 9. The federal Secretariat of Security and Citizen Protection declared a special alert for parts of Jalisco and Colima and set up three command centers headed by Jalisco Governor Pablo Lemus and Colima Governor Indira Vizcaíno. Plan DN-III-E and Plan Marina were put into effect by the Security Secretariat. The Comisión Federal de Electricidad deployed crews to Guerrero to prepare for response to Simon. Schools were closed in 22 municipalities of Jalisco and across the state of Guerrero. Beaches and ports were shuttered in Armería, Manzanillo, and Tecomán in Colima. The Port of Manzanillo also shut down for the hurricane. All non-essential activities in 10 coastal municipalities of Jalisco were prohibited beginning on the afternoon of October 10. About 100 families from the communities of Yelapa and Quimixto were evacuated by ferry to Puerto Vallarta by the Mexican Navy. About 5,000 people evacuated in Jalisco and Colima combined. In Nayarit, the state government prepared 171 shelters for possible evacuations following recent tidal floods in coastal areas.

Governor Greg Abbott of Texas activated emergency resources on October 13 due to the threat of the storm.

== Impact ==
Aon plc estimated that losses from Simon totaled to more than US$10 million and that five people were killed by the storm.

Heavy rainfall from Simon caused flooding in Chiapas. In Oxchuc, a 20-year-old man drowned after being swept away by an overflowing river. In Ocosingo, a bridge collapsed. Moisture from Simon combined with Hurricane Isaias caused heavy rainfall across Oaxaca. Flooded roads and landslides were reported. In San Pedro Tapanatepec, 120 homes were flooded by storm surge.

One person was killed by the hurricane in Chilpancingo after a stone wall collapsed onto a home. Two injuries occurred in Acapulco. Sixteen utility poles were damaged. A total of 391 millimetres (15.4 in) of rain fell in 24 hours. A total of 65,780 customers in Guerrero lost electricity during the storm. An electrical substation in Puerto Marqués was flooded and had to be shut down. Power outages were reported across 13 municipalities. Damage was reported across at least 20 municipalities. 150 businesses were flooded and 60 vehicles were stranded in floodwaters. At least 201 homes were damaged and 30 fallen trees were reported. Six homes were destroyed. Seven damaged walls and two sinkholes were reported. Businesses in Acapulco suffered losses of Mex$33 million (US$1.76 million). Multiple sections of the Costa Chica highway were damaged, isolating several communities. Approximately 60 tons of trash were washed onto beaches from rainwater runoff from Simon. Numerous public transportation were suspended in Acapulco. At least twelve boats sank due to rough surf. Eighteen people in In La Unión were evacuated due to storm surge generated by Simon. More than 280 businesses in Acapulco suffered losses from closures from Simon. Homes in Acapulco were left without drinking water due to the contamination of the Papagayo River.

In Colima, 71 homes and 35 businesses were flooded. 73 fallen trees and six landslides and mudslides were reported. Eleven schools were damaged by floodwaters. Damage was reported along thirteen sections of the Armería-Manzanillo highway. Four communities were left temporarily isolated. In Armería, a portion of a ceiling of a hospital collapsed. In Manzanillo, one person was rescued from rough surf. In Cihuatlán, storm surge from Simon damaged a portion of a boardwalk. Officials estimated damage at Mex$35 million (US$1.87 million). Six homes were flooded and one home partially collapsed. A portion of the Manzanillo-Puerto Vallarta was destroyed by an overflowing river. In Morelia, numerous banana farmers suffered crop damage from the storm. Across Colima, Jalisco, and Michoacán 31,325 Comisión Federal de Electricidad customers lost power. In Mazatlán, a man drowned after being swept out to sea. In Teacapán, a fisherman was rescued from a sinking boat. Waves from Simon washed up 2 tons of trash onto beaches. In Nayarit, storm surge inundated at least a dozen restaurants and businesses. At least three neighborhoods in San Blas were flooded by storm surge. In Puerto Vallarta, more than 100 flights were cancelled, leaving numerous tourists stranded.

Further north, tropical enhanced moisture affected parts of Texas and Oklahoma. Oklahoma City recorded their second wettest day on record from the rains, while a tornado touched down in Fort Stockton, Texas. Simon also enhanced a round of severe storms across Kansas and Missouri.

== See also ==
- Weather of 2026
- Tropical cyclones in 2026
- Hurricane Beatriz (2011)
- Hurricane Patricia (2015)
- Hurricane Carlos (2015)
- Hurricane Nora (2021)
