= Tropical cyclones in 2026 =

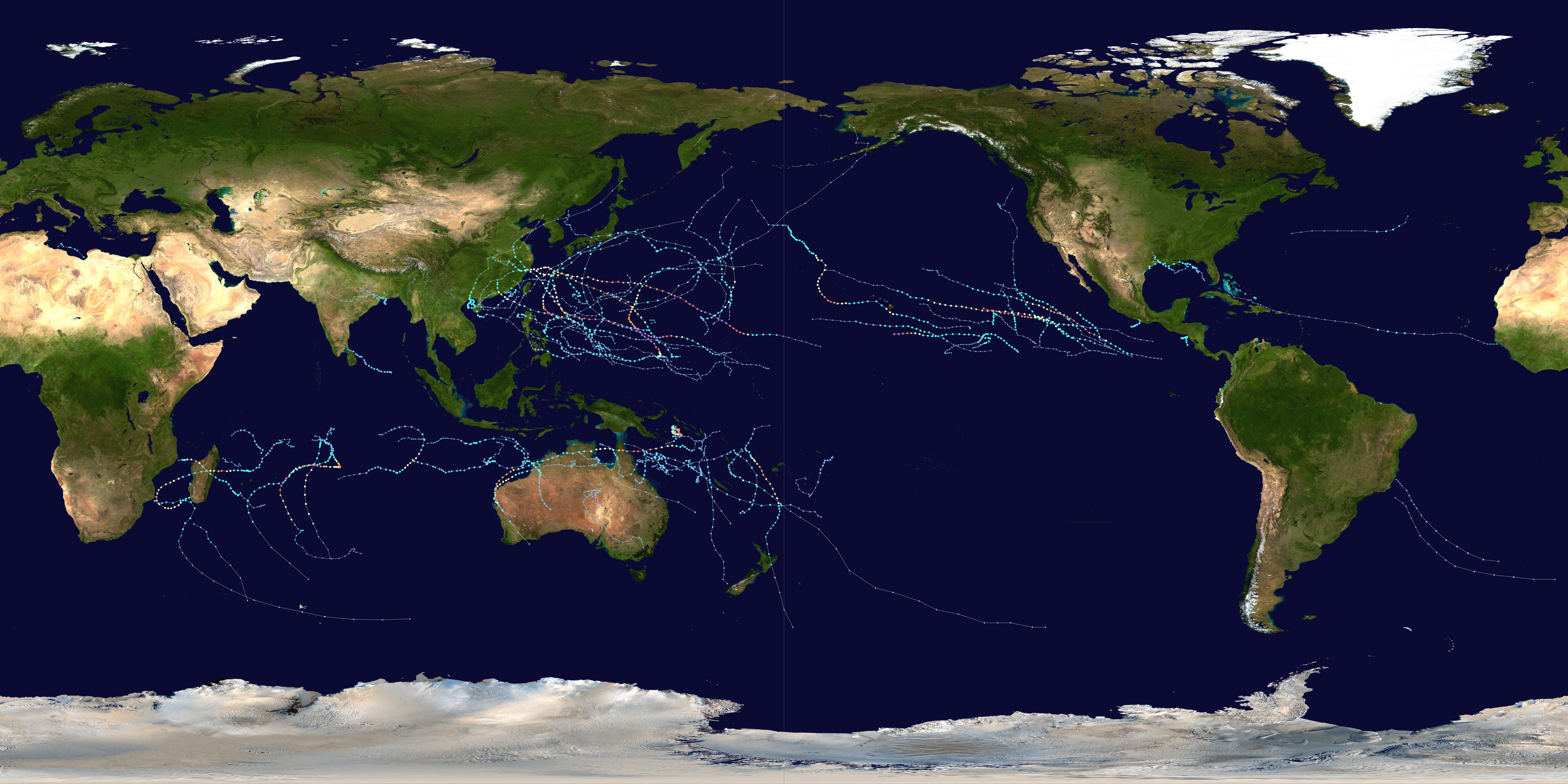
- Year summary map

Year boundaries
- First system: Jenna
- Formed: January 3, 2026

Strongest system
- Name: Polo (Note: The "strength" of a tropical cyclone is measured by the minimum barometric pressure, not wind speed. Most meteorological organizations rate the intensity of a storm by this figure, so the lower the minimum pressure of the storm, the more intense or "stronger" it is considered to be. The strongest winds were actually from Sinlaku, and Champi, at 185 mph (295 km/h).)
- Lowest pressure: 892 mbar (hPa); 26.34 inHg

Longest lasting system
- Name: Saudel and Nolo
- Duration: 20 days

Year statistics
- Total systems: 132, 4 unofficial
- Named systems: 92
- Total fatalities: 695 (13)
- Total damage: $18.55 billion (2026 USD)
Related articles
- 2026 Atlantic hurricane season
- 2026 Pacific hurricane season
- 2026 Pacific typhoon season
- 2026 North Indian Ocean cyclone season
- 2025–26 South-West Indian Ocean cyclone season
- 2026–27 South-West Indian Ocean cyclone season
- 2025–26 Australian region cyclone season
- 2026–27 Australian region cyclone season
- 2025–26 South Pacific cyclone season
- 2026–27 South Pacific cyclone season

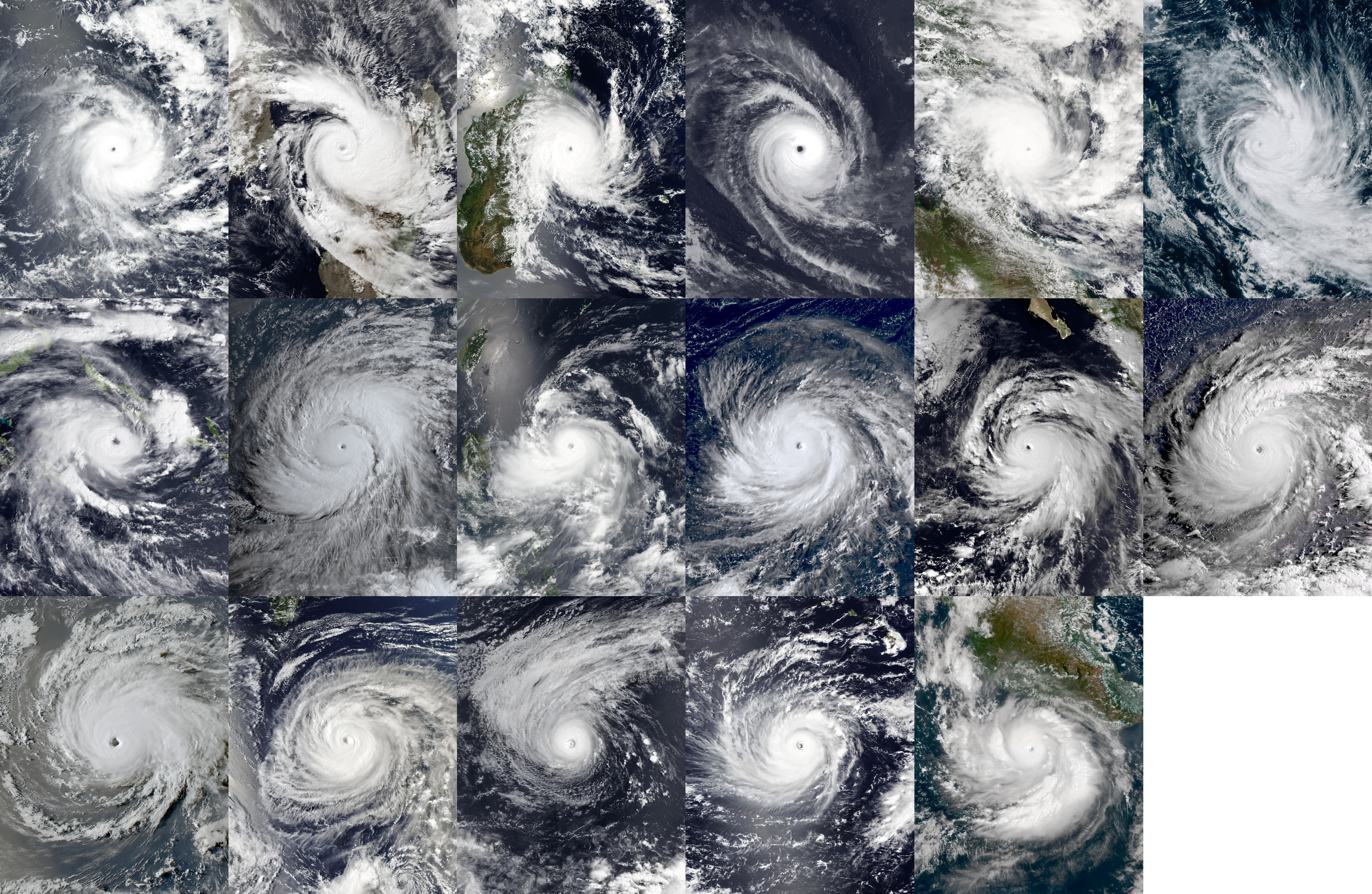
Satellite photo of the 31 tropical cyclones worldwide that reached at least Category 3 on the Saffir–Simpson scale so far, that being Dudzai in January to Xavier in November. Among them, Polo (fifth image in the third row) is the most intense, with a minimum central pressure of 892 hPa.

In 2026, tropical cyclones have been forming in seven major bodies of water, commonly known as tropical cyclone basins. Tropical cyclones will be named by various weather agencies when they attain maximum sustained winds of 35 knots (65 km/h; 40 mph). So far, 130 tropical cyclones have formed (excluding 3 unofficial tropical/subtropical depressions and 1 subtropical storm), and 91 of which have received an official name and/or attained tropical storm-force winds. The strongest system so far was Hurricane Polo in the Eastern Pacific basin, which attained 1-minute sustained winds of 285 km/h (180 mph) and a minimum barometric pressure of 892 hPa (26.34 inHg). The deadliest system so far was Tropical Storm Maysak in the Western Pacific basin, which caused 171 deaths, while the costliest system was Typhoon Dolphin which caused US$4.12 billion in damages mainly in China, both systems in the Western Pacific basin. The accumulated cyclone energy (ACE) index for the year (seven basins combined), as calculated by Colorado State University (CSU), is 934.2 units overall, as of October 31.

Tropical cyclones are primarily monitored by 9 warning centers around the world, which are designated as a Regional Specialized Meteorological Center (RSMC) or a Tropical Cyclone Warning Center (TCWC) by the World Meteorological Organization (WMO). These centers are: National Hurricane Center (NHC), Japan Meteorological Agency (JMA), Indian Meteorological Department (IMD), Météo-France (MFR), Indonesia's Meteorology, Climatology, and Geophysical Agency (BMKG), Australian Bureau of Meteorology (BoM), Papua New Guinea's National Weather Service (PNGNWS), Fiji Meteorological Service (FMS), and New Zealand's MetService. Unofficial, but still notable, warning centers include the Philippine Atmospheric, Geophysical and Astronomical Services Administration (PAGASA; albeit official within the Philippines), the United States's Joint Typhoon Warning Center (JTWC), and the Brazilian Navy Hydrographic Center.

== Global atmospheric and hydrologic conditions ==
Satellite imagery of three tropical cyclones active simultaneously on April 9 across the Northern and Southern Hemisphere: 04W (later Sinlaku) (top), Maila (center) and Vaianu (bottom)

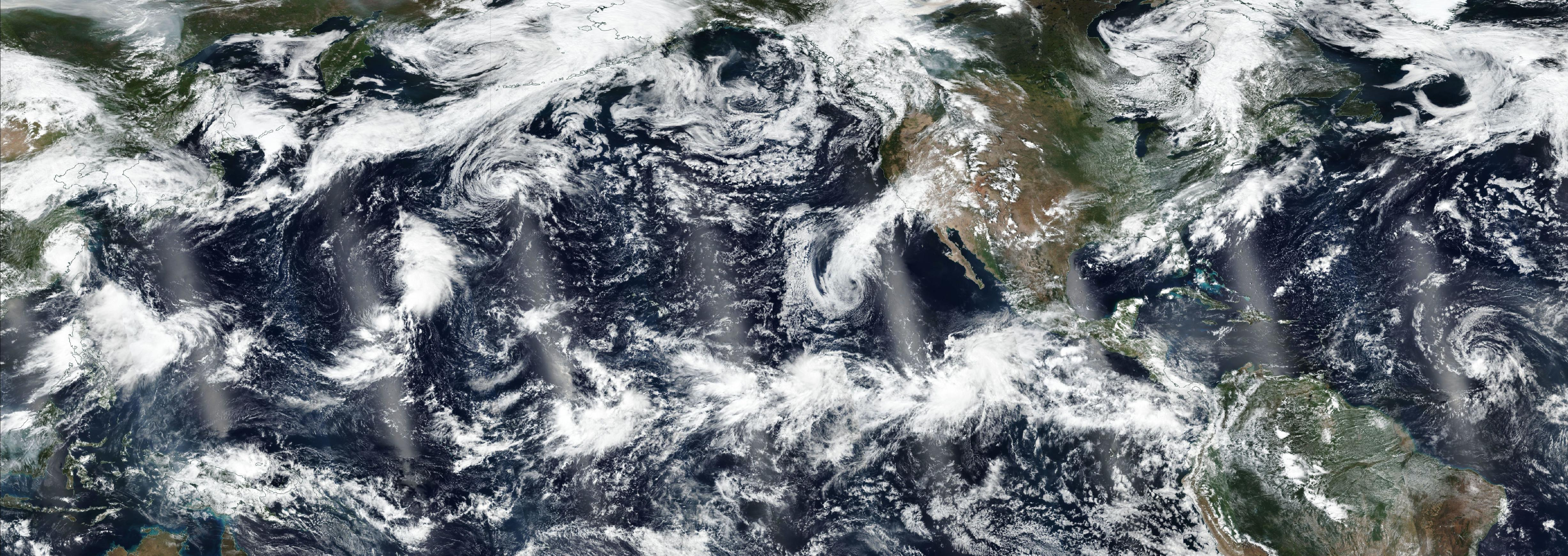
Seven tropical cyclones active simultaneously on August 27 (Left to right: Saudel, Bang-Lang, Etau, Lala, Lowell, Karina and Dolly)

Global tropical cyclone activity during 2026 was shaped by a transition in the El Niño–Southern Oscillation (ENSO) phase. The year opened under weak-to-neutral La Niña conditions continuing from late 2025, which contributed to heightened tropical cyclone activity across the Southern Hemisphere basins—including the South-West Indian Ocean and Australian region—during January and February.

By mid-2026, sea surface temperature (SST) anomalies across the central and eastern equatorial Pacific indicated a rapid transition toward El Niño conditions. This warming trend suppressed early-season activity in the Atlantic basin, where high vertical wind shear led to a slow start with only two named tropical storms (Arthur and Bertha) forming through July. Conversely, the warming equatorial Pacific enhanced environmental conditions in the Eastern and Central Pacific and the Western Pacific, supporting rapid intensification events such as Super Typhoon Sinlaku in April and Major Hurricane Genevieve in July.

Sustained marine heatwaves across the Northern Hemisphere during the northern summer contributed to well-above-average sea surface temperatures in the Western Pacific and Northern Indian Ocean, fueling early basin activity and high accumulated cyclone energy (ACE) totals relative to long-term averages by midyear.

== Summary ==
=== North Atlantic Ocean ===
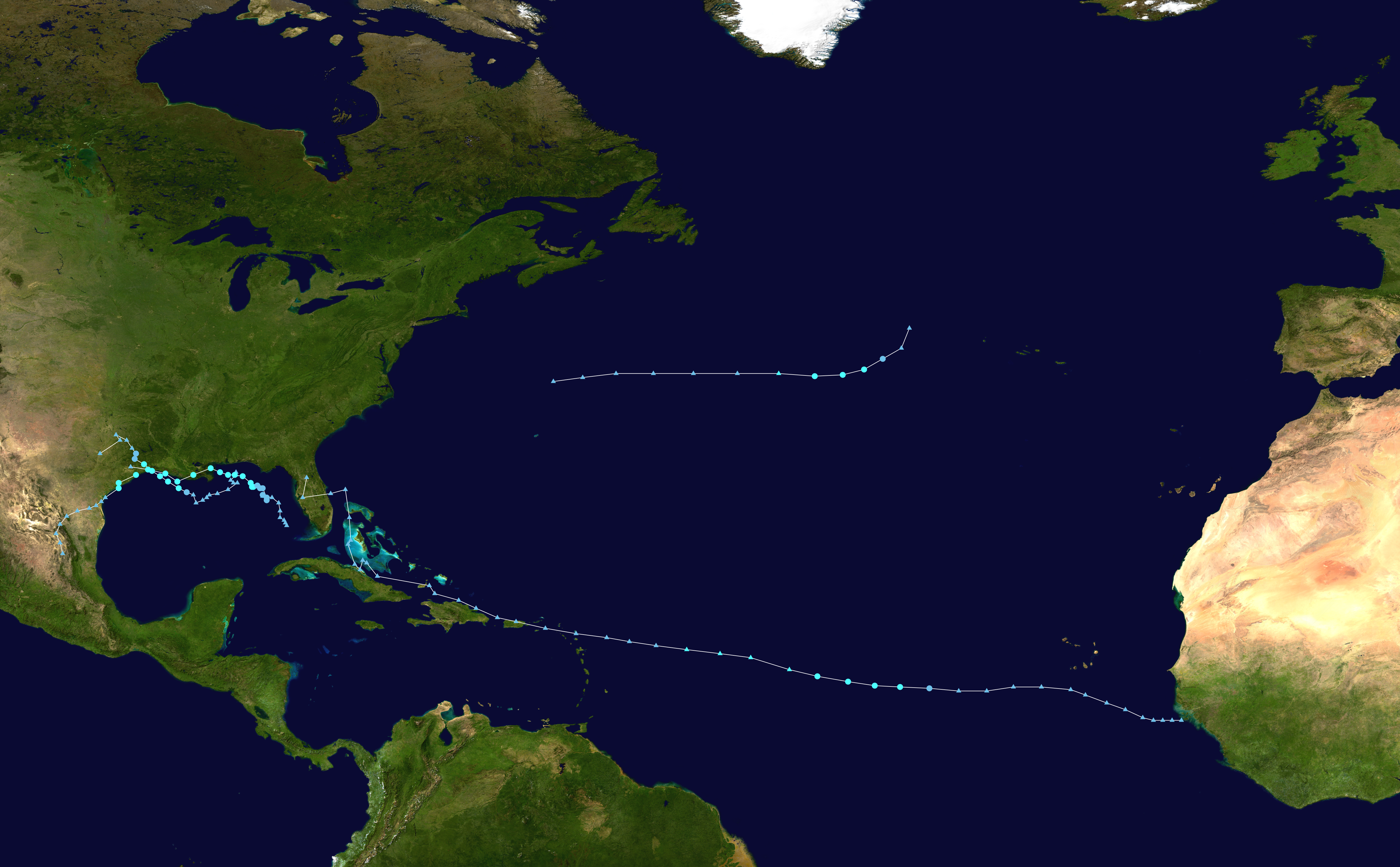
2026 Atlantic hurricane season summary map

On June 17, Tropical Storm Arthur formed in the northwestern Gulf of Mexico after emerging off the Texas coastline. On July 19, Tropical Depression Two formed in the northeastern Gulf of Mexico. On July 20, the storm became Tropical Storm Bertha. It would then make landfall in St. Bernard Parish on July 22 and again near Lake Charles, Louisiana on July 23 before dissipating over Texas. Quiet conditions resumed until August 12, when Tropical Storm Cristobal formed well east-northeast of Bermuda. Once again, a period of calm would occur until August 27, when an area of low pressure became designated as Tropical Storm Dolly. The name was a coincidence with the passing of Dolly Parton. Due to high shear, the storm dissipated over the Lesser Antilles and brought heavy rains to the area. The unseasonable quiet remained until the end of the month, when Tropical Storm Edouard developed in the Gulf and made landfall in Louisiana before causing tremendous flooding in the region.On September 19, Tropical Storm Fay developed in the subtropical North Atlantic; despite briefly approaching hurricane intensity, strong wind shear rapidly degraded the system. On September 24, a weak tropical depression formed near the Cabo Verde Islands and was designated Tropical Storm Gonzalo the following day. On September 28, Tropical Storm Hanna formed southeast of Bermuda, remaining a lopsided tropical storm before becoming post-tropical on 30 September. On October 3, as a result of the Central American Gyre, a low pressure system formed in the Gulf. This system would become Hurricane Isaias, receiving its name on October 7 and becoming a hurricane on October 8. This broke the record for latest hurricane in the Atlantic, but despite the hostile conditions to cyclones in the Atlantic, it became Category 3 before making landfall near Destin, Florida on October 9. On October 21, a nor’easter near the east coast became Subtropical Storm Josephine, which then became an extratropical cyclone the next day.

=== Eastern and Central Pacific Oceans ===
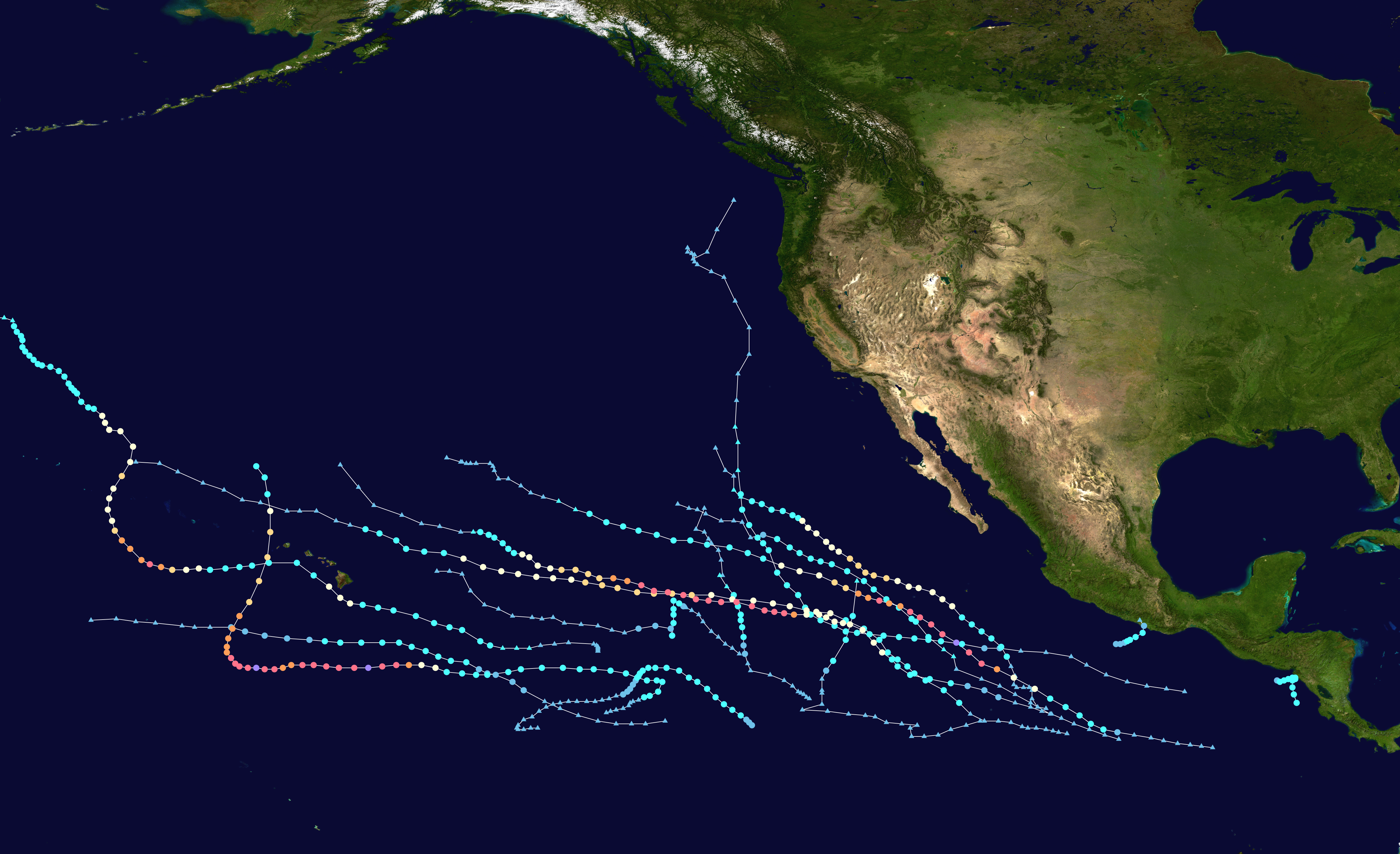
2026 Pacific hurricane season summary map

Tropical Depression One-E formed in the open Pacific on June 2, eventually strengthening into Tropical Storm Amanda the following day. Tropical Depression Two-E formed near Mexico on June 7, rapidly approaching towards it. It intensified into a tropical storm and got named Boris. Tropical Depression Three-E formed near Central America on June 8, intensifying into a tropical storm and being named Cristina shortly after. Boris affected southern Mexico while Cristina dumped torrential rain in Central America. On July 1, a disturbance in the Pacific developed into Tropical Storm Douglas and would meander around before dissipating by July 3. On July 14, another storm formed and was named Tropical Storm Elida, would impact Clarion Island, before it would degenerate into a remnant low on July 20. On July 19, Hurricane Fausto formed, becoming the first hurricane of the season a day later. Hurricane Genevieve formed soon after on July 24. It later became the first category 5 hurricane of the season. On August 13, tropical storms Hernan and Lala formed, the latter of which being the first storm of the season to form within the Central Pacific basin. Lala later rapidly intensified and became a category 4 major hurricane after affecting Hawaii. Tropical Storm Moke formed after the rapid intensification of Lala.

Activity escalated further into September, driven by exceptionally high sea surface temperatures from an intensifying El Niño. On September 20, Hurricane Odalys and Hurricane Polo formed off the Pacific coast of Mexico, the latter underwent explosive rapid intensification, adding 110 mph (180 km/h) to its wind speeds over a 24-hour period. Polo peaked as a Category 5 major hurricane on September 22 with maximum sustained winds of 180 mph (290 km/h) and a minimum central pressure of 892 mb (26.34 inHg). This made Polo the second-most intense Pacific hurricane on record by central pressure, behind only Hurricane Patricia in 2015. Concurrently, Nolo formed south of Hawaii on September 24, bringing threat of localized flooding to the Hawaiian Islands, before it crossed the International Date Line.

=== Western Pacific Ocean ===
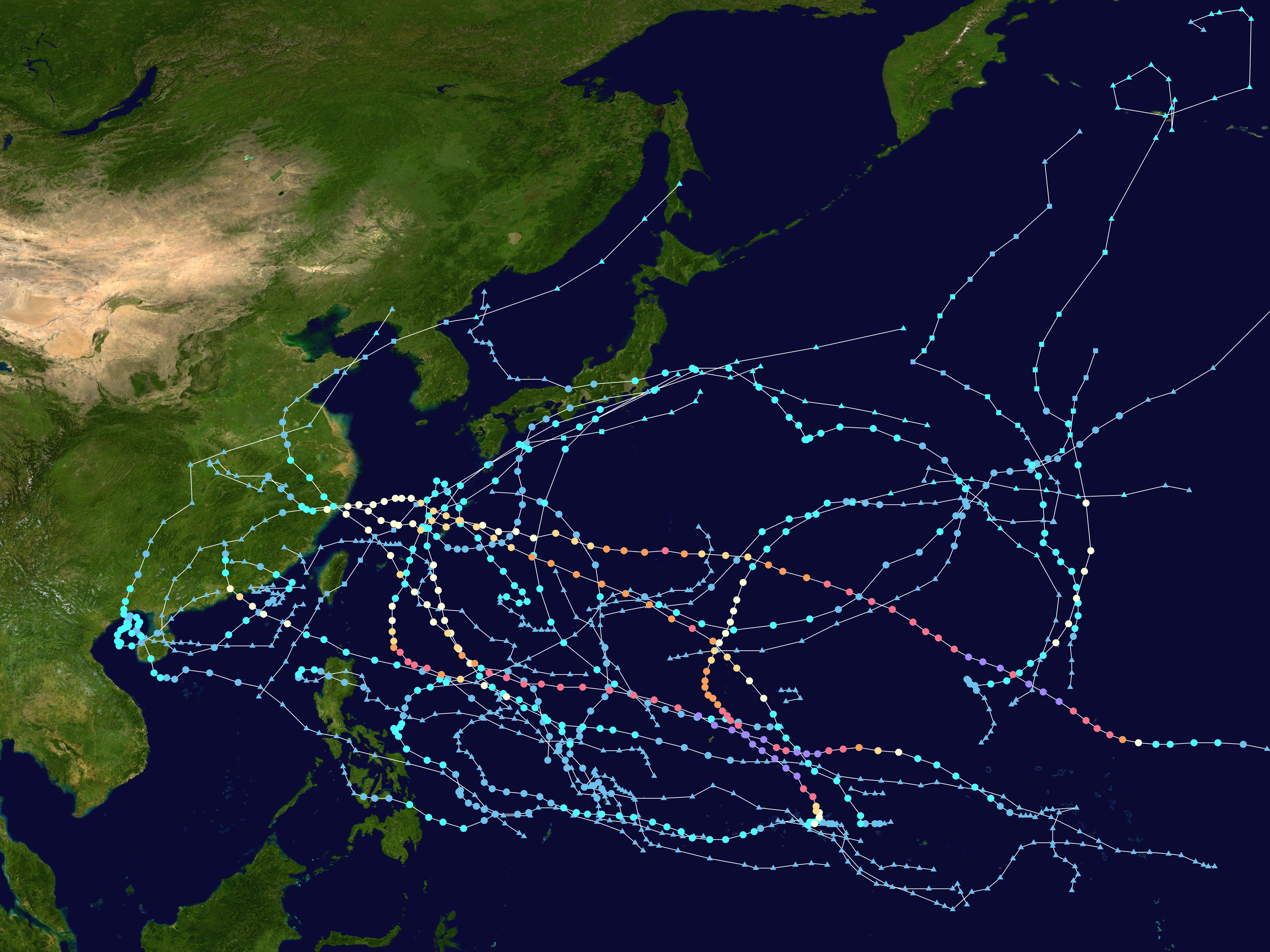
2026 Pacific typhoon season summary map

A tropical depression formed east of the Philippines on 13 January, marking the start of the season. The depression was subsequently named Ada by PAGASA and later Nokaen by the JMA respectively on January 14 and 15, marking it the earliest start to a season since 2019. A tropical depression formed near Guam on February 3, it later entered the PAR and was named Basyang, it was named Penha the following day. Tropical Storm Nuri formed northeast of Yap on March 10. Tropical Storm Sinlaku formed west of Pohnpei on April 8, later intensified into a typhoon on April 10 and was recognised as a super typhoon on April 12, it later reached a peak of 115 knots (215 km/h) and 905 mb (26.72 inHg). Tropical Storm Hagupit formed near Chuuk on May 5, it entered the PAR on May 9, gaining the name Caloy. Tropical Storm Jangmi formed on May 26 and entered the PAR on May 28, gaining the name Domeng, it slowly intensified into a category 1 typhoon on May 30 before making landfall in Wakayama Prefecture on June 3. A tropical depression formed on June 3, it entered the PAR on June 4, gaining the name Ester, a few hours later, JTWC classified it as a subtropical depression before making landfall in Taiwan. On June 18, Tropical Storm Mekkhala formed south of the Mariana Islands, it rapidly intensified into a Category 4 typhoon on June 22. Tropical Storm Higos formed the same day.

Activity accelerated sharply in July with Maysak forming on July 1, tracking across Hainan Island and northern Vietnam before dumping catastrophic rainfall over southwestern China that caused US$3.28 billion in damages and 39 fatalities. Immediately following, Bavi, which formed on June 30, passed very near Rota, bringing destructive winds and flooding to the Mariana Islands. After tracking over the islands, Bavi caused 26 deaths in the Philippines, before hitting Zhejiang, China, on July 11.

Mid-to-late summer saw the formation of many more systems. Tropical Storm Haishen became the first tropical storm to be recognized by the Japan Meteorological Agency, but not by the Joint Typhoon Warning Center since Mulan in 2022. In late July, Typhoon Noul struck Guangdong as a Category 2-equivalent typhoon. Concurrently, a tropical depression crossed the International Date Line and entered the basin. It rapidly intensified into the massive Typhoon Dolphin, a Category 5-equivalent violent typhoon that underwent four eyewall replacement cycles as it churned through open ocean, eventually weakening before making landfall in Zhejiang, China.

As Dolphin made its long journey across the Western Pacific, a cluster of weaker storms formed. These included Tropical Storm Kujira, Severe Tropical Storm Chan-hom, Tropical Storm Peilou, and Tropical Storm Nangka. Long-lived Typhoon Saudel formed on August 15, rapidly attaining Category 4-equivalent status before weakening and making landfall in Zhejiang, China. It then moved across southern China and into the South China Sea, where it regenerated into a tropical storm and made two mode landfalls. By late August and September, monsoonal activity fueled a flurry of short-lived systems across the basin, including Tropical Storm Narra, Tropical Storm Gaenari, Tropical Storm Atsani, Typhoon Bang-Lang, Tropical Storm Etau, and Tropical Storm Krovanh, the latter of which enhanced monsoon rainfall and caused widespread flooding across the central Philippines.

A brief period of inactivity followed the dissipation of Krovanh, but activity soon resumed in late September with the development of Typhoon Dujuan. Forming east of the Philippines on 19 September, Dujuan rapidly organized as it tracked north-northwestward along Japan's eastern Pacific coastline on September 21–22. The massive system brought record-breaking rainfall across the Kanto region and the Izu Islands, including a September-record 600 mm (23.6 in) of rain within 24 hours on Oshima, prompting a Level 5 landslide special warning from the Japan Meteorological Agency. Dujuan's torrential rainfall and powerful wind gusts up to 144 km/h (90 mph) caused devastating landslides and urban flooding across Chiba and Kanagawa prefectures, resulting in at least four confirmed fatalities, several missing persons, power outages for over 9,000 households, and widespread grounding of transportation networks during Japan's Silver Week holidays. Following Dujuan's passage, on 21 September, another tropical depression formed over the Philippine Sea. The system later developed into Typhoon Surigae, a Category 4-equivalent super typhoon that brought heavy rainfall to the Philippines and Japan. 3 days after Surigae formed, a depression formed, in which that would turn into Deep Depression BOB 07. On September 27, a depression formed, in which it was named Choi-wan and it rapidly intensified into a Category 5 typhoon. On October 3, a depression formed, in which it was named Koguma the day after. Nolo, which was previously a hurricane, crossed the International Date Line, and became a typhoon. In October 10, Tropical Depression 28W formed, and on October 13, the JMA noted a tropical depression near Micronesia and a day later, it strengthened into a tropical storm, receiving the name Champi. In October 17, Champi went through rapid intensification and passes through Guam as Very Strong Typhoon. Which later, Champi surpass Sinlaku strength, and caused over 616 people injured with 1 reported died, although Champi did not make landfall. In October 25, JTWC noticed and named the system as Tropical Depression 30W, and later named as In-fa, which affected Northern Mariana Islands, and become extra-tropical system in November 6, holding as Very Strong Typhoon. In November 7, Typhoon Cempaka officially formed, mark as first season to reached 32 systems since 1994.

=== North Indian Ocean ===
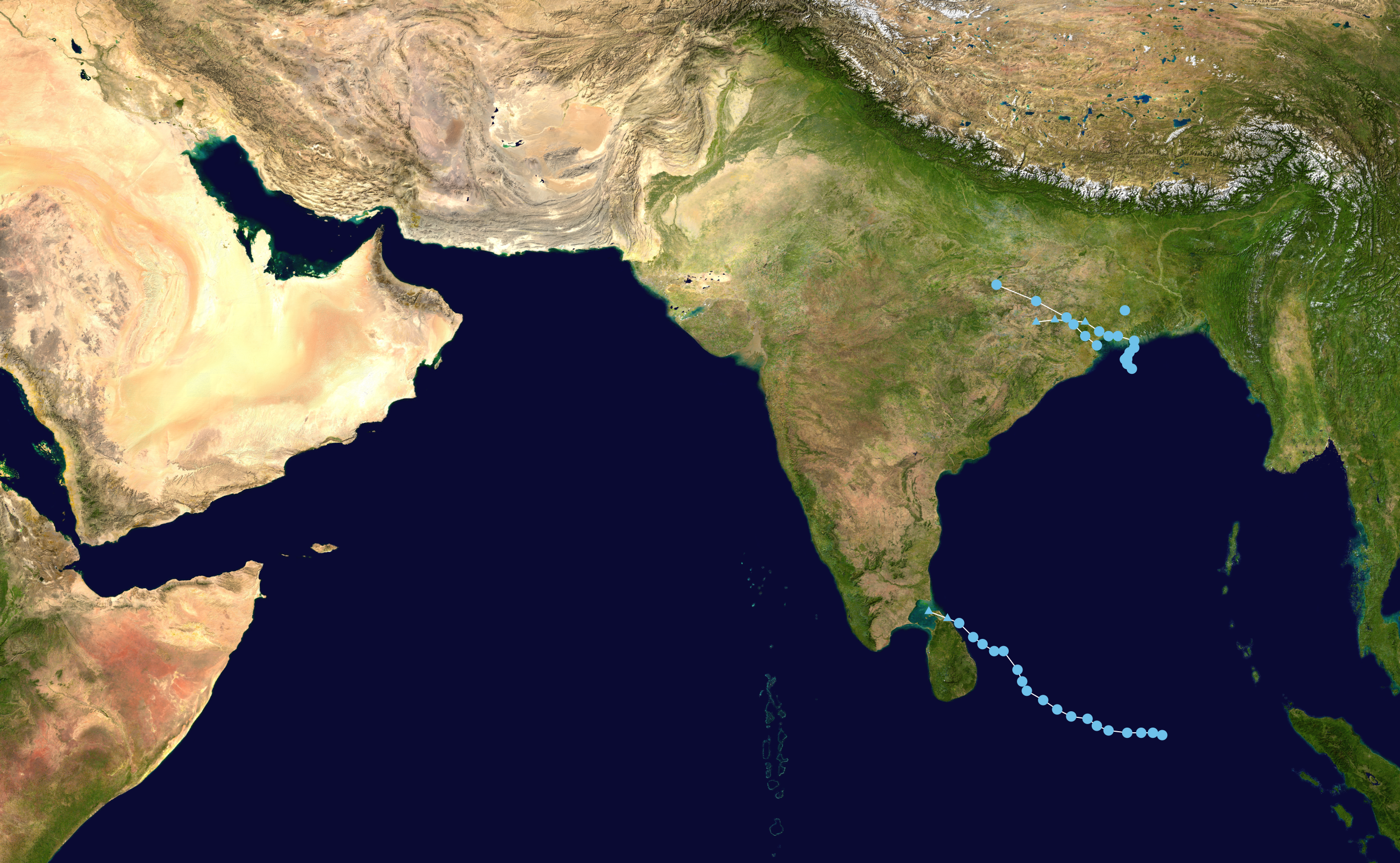
2026 North Indian Ocean cyclone season summary map

On 7 January, BOB 01 formed in the Bay of Bengal. After six months of inactivity, on 5 July, BOB 02 formed and struck Odisha. BOB 03 formed on 26 July, causing mass flooding in Odisha as it made landfall. BOB 04 formed southeast of Kolkata on 13 August, dissipating the following day. On 17 August, BOB 05 formed inland over West Bengal, dissipating 2 days later near North Jharkhand. Activity resumed in late September as a well-marked low-pressure system over the Bay of Bengal organized into Depression BOB 06 on 21 September. Moving west-northwestward under the influence of the regional monsoon trough, the storm intensified into a Deep Depression on 22 September. BOB 06 made landfall near Kalingapatnam, along the north Andhra Pradesh and south Odisha coastline, late on 23 September with peak sustained winds of 55–65 km/h (35–40 mph). The storm brought widespread heavy rainfall, urban inundation, and squally winds across coastal Andhra Pradesh, Odisha, and Telangana as it moved inland and steadily weakened through 25 September.

=== Mediterranean Sea ===
2026 Mediterranean tropical-like cyclones summary map

A European windstorm named Samuel, known as Jolina in Germany, formed near Spain and Italy before transitioning into a subtropical cyclone over the south-central Mediterranean sea. It moved inland over Libya on 18 March, before dissipating west near Egypt. One person died attempting to rescue people from floodwaters due to the damage Samuel had done.

=== South-West Indian Ocean ===
==== January – June ====
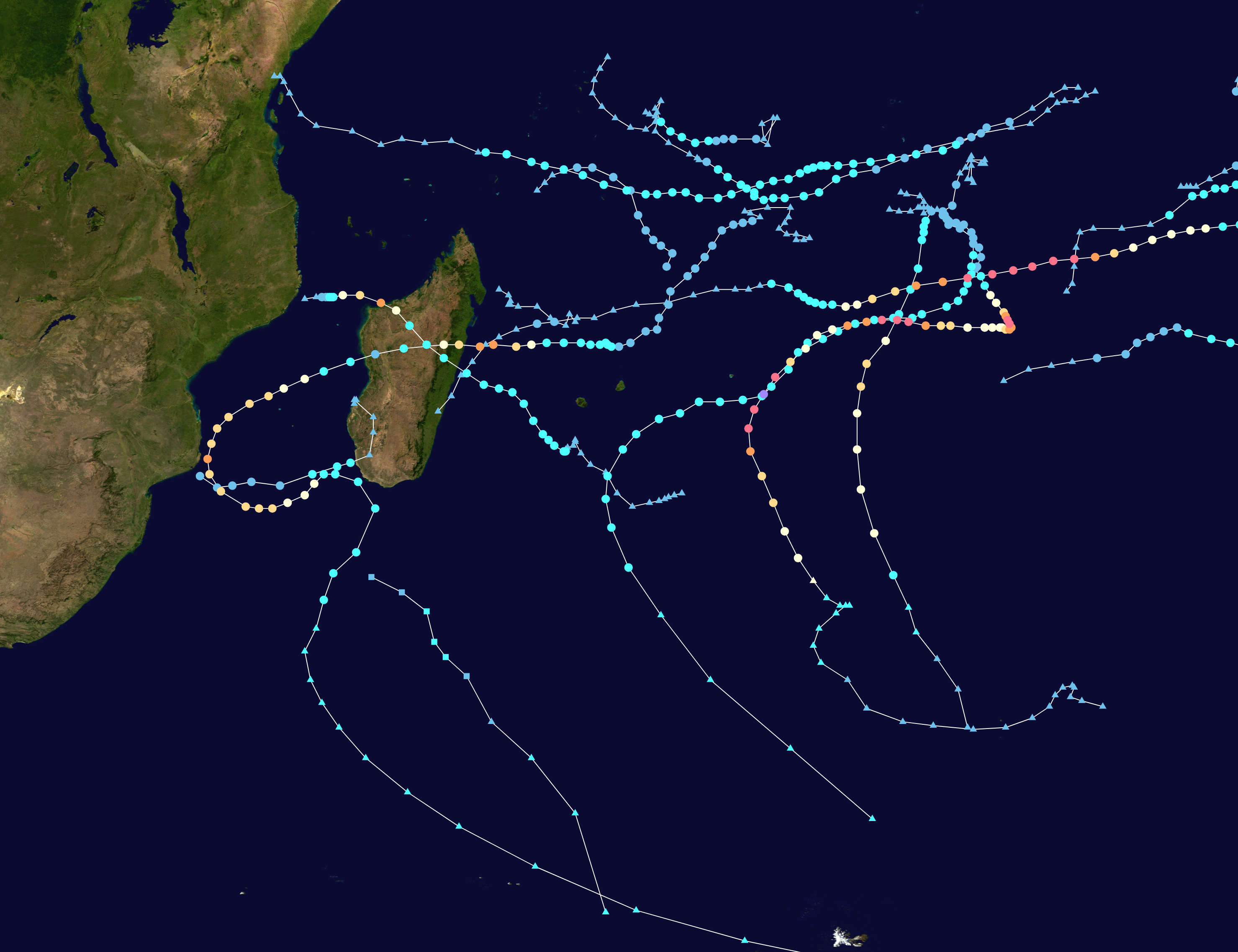
2025–2026 South-West Indian Ocean cyclone season summary map

The first cyclone of the year for this basin was Grant, which entered the basin on December 27 and rapidly intensified into an Intense Tropical Cyclone, and persisted into the new year. In mid-January, Dudzai formed and rapidly intensified into an Intense Tropical Cyclone. Ewetse formed and made landfall in Madagascar the following day. Zone of Disturbed Weather 08 formed on February 27. Fytia formed in the Mozambique Channel and intensified into a tropical cyclone on January 30. Gezani soon formed two days after Fytia dissipated. Horacio formed less than one day after Gezani turned post-tropical. Horacio strengthened to category 5 strength on the Saffir-Simpson Hurricane Wind Scale on 24 February, making it the first tropical cyclone to have reached that intensity this year. Tropical Depression 12 formed on March 12 and Cyclone Indusa formed on April 1. An extratropical cyclone formed on April 26, it later developed subtropical characteristics, and was named Juluka the following day.

==== July – December ====
2026–2027 South-West Indian Ocean cyclone season summary map

The season began on October 19, when Agueda formed.

=== Australian Region ===
==== January – June ====
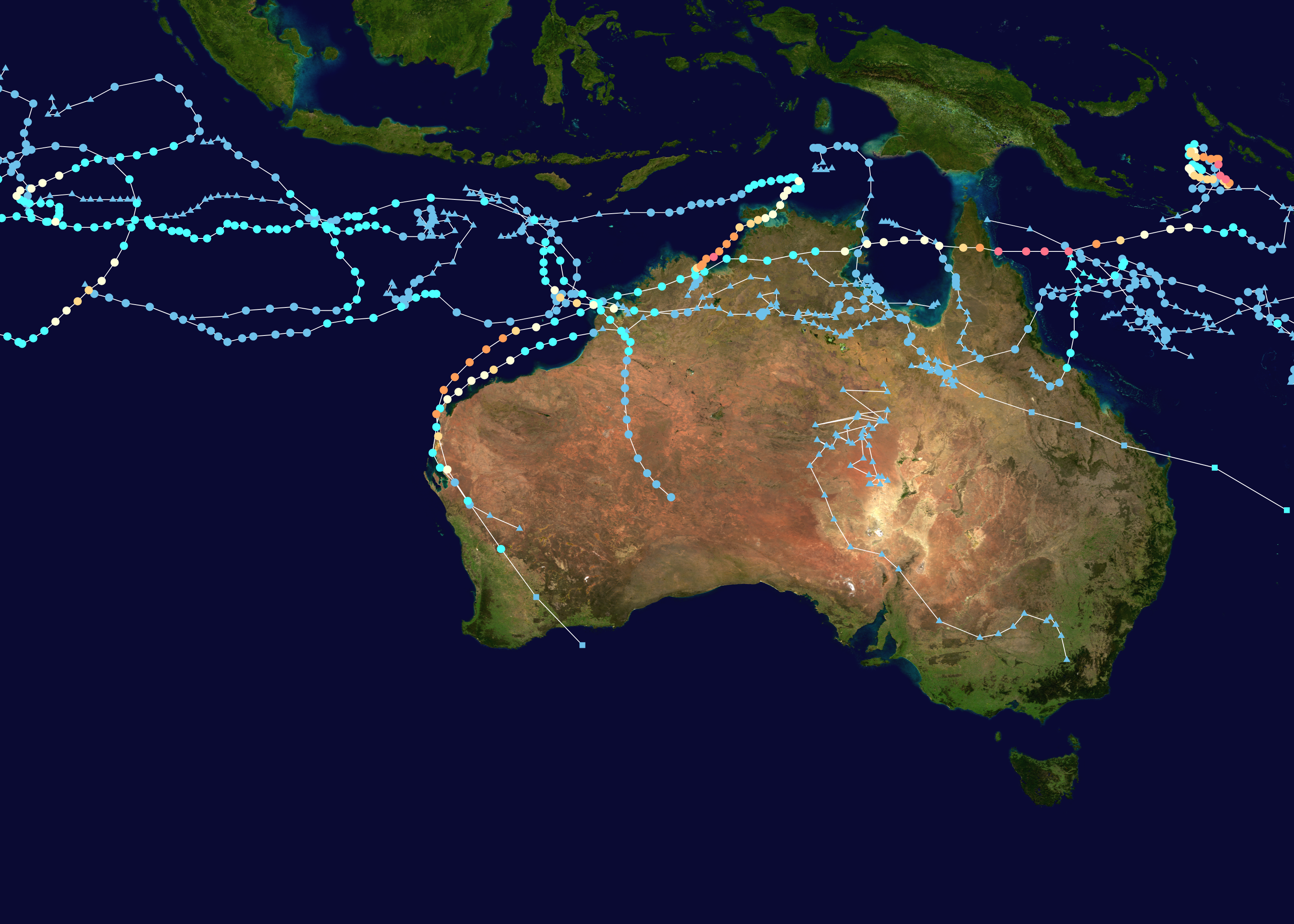
2025–2026 Australian region cyclone season summary map

07U formed in the Arafura Sea on December 14, and it didn’t dissipate until January 1. Iggy formed near Indonesia on December 29. Jenna followed suit on 3 January, and Koji formed off the northeast Queensland coast on 10 January. After developing in the Coral Sea and reaching Category 2 intensity, Tropical Cyclone Koji weakened to a tropical low before making landfall between Ayr and Bowen, Queensland, on the morning of 11 January, 2026, where it delivered life-threatening rainfall and flash flooding. Tropical Cyclone Luana formed from Koji’s remnants on January 18, and Mitchell formed on 6 February. Tropical Low 23U formed on February 11, 26U formed on February 24. Tropical Lows 30U, 28U, 31U and 29U formed on March 1 and 2, and Cyclone Narelle formed March 17. A week after Narelle became extratropical, Cyclone Maila formed. It was the first tropical cyclone in TCWC Port Moresby’s area of responsibility since Cyclone Guba in 2007.

==== July – December ====
2026–2027 Australian region cyclone season summary map

Tropical Low 01U formed on 15 November.

=== South Pacific Ocean ===
==== January – June ====
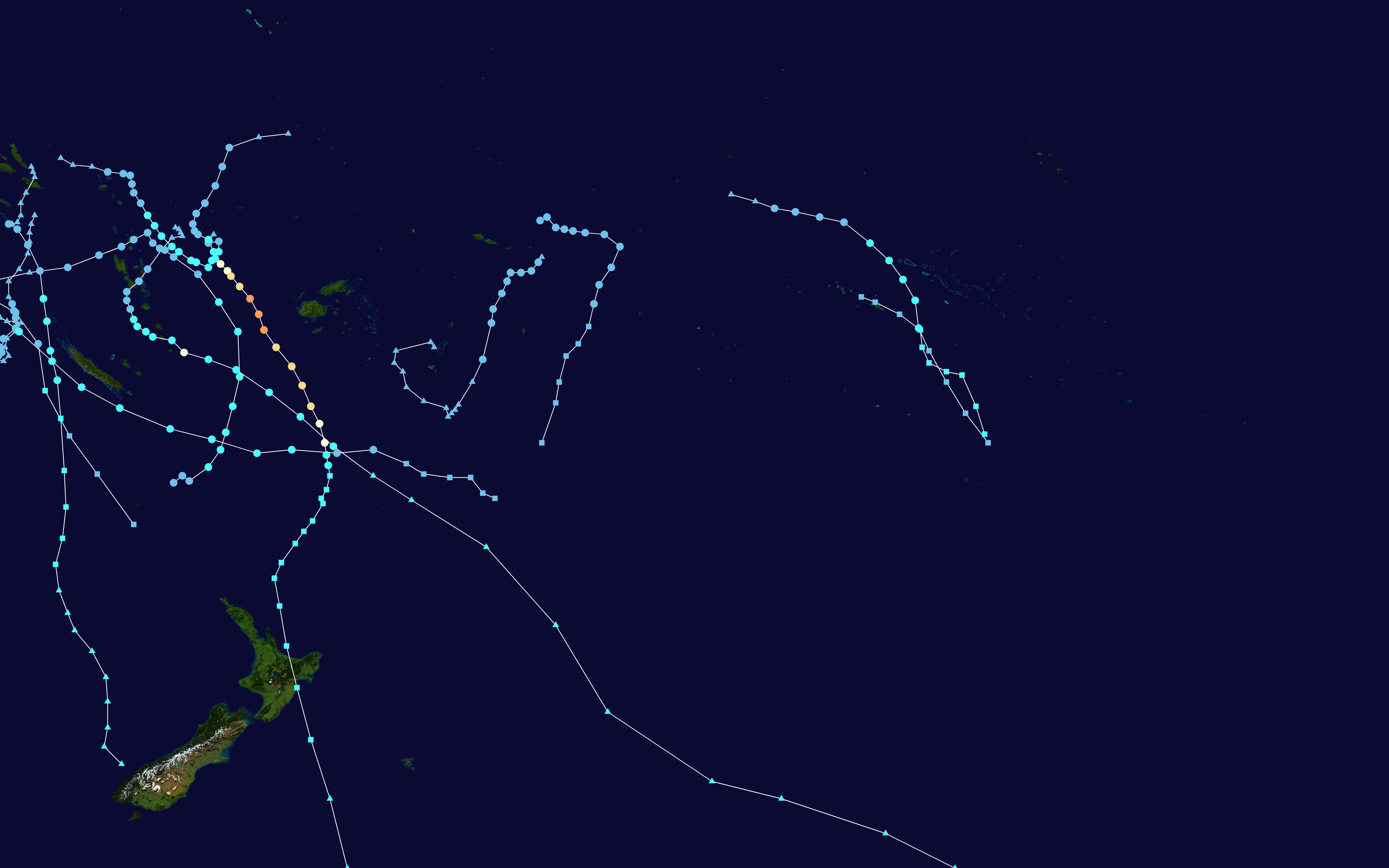
2025–2026 South Pacific cyclone season summary map

Tropical Disturbance 04F persisted from last year, Tropical Low 14U did a crossover and got renumbered as 05F in January 19, shortly after it became post-tropical and left 10 dead. Tropical Depression 06F formed shorlly after, dissipating rapidly. Tropical Disturbance 07F following the peak activity got noted, Tropical Disturbance 09F developed at February 26 after nearly a month of inactivity, the Fiji Meteorological Service named it Urmil, strong winds associated with the storm made a child drown in Namoli at Kaleli Settlement. Tropical Disturbance 10F formed on March 21, then it was last noted by the FMS at March 24. On April 3 a westerly wind burst formed an disturbance marked as 11F by the FMS, 2 days later, it was named Vaianu, it made a landfall in New Zealand, causing $1.5 million dollars of damage and was the last system of the season.

==== July – December ====
2026–2027 South Pacific cyclone season summary map

Tropical Disturbance 01F formed in October 14, before it got named Wati 2 days later. Wati did some damage in Cook Islands

=== South Atlantic Ocean ===
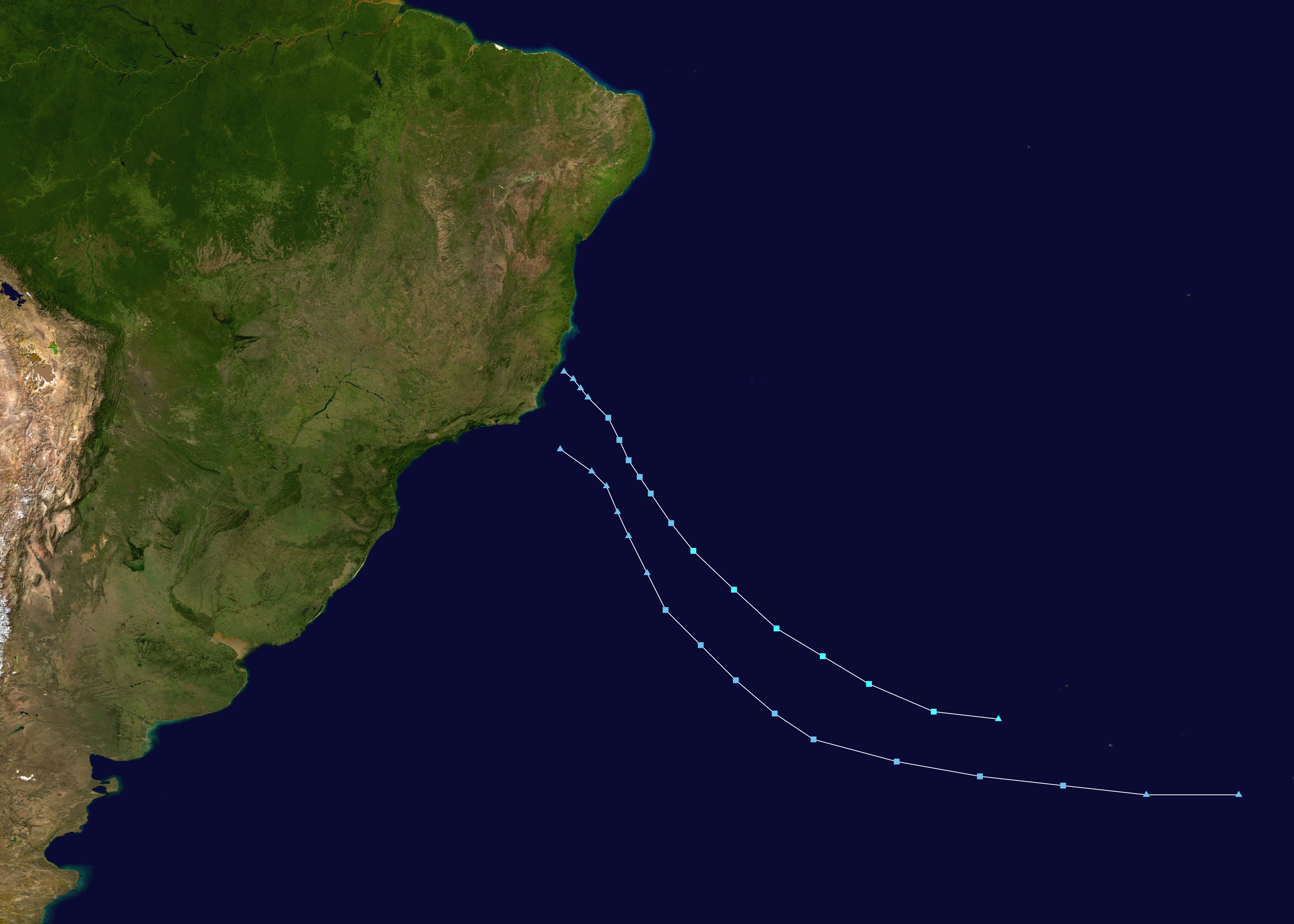
2026 South Atlantic cyclones summary map

On February 28, a subtropical depression was noted off the coast of the state of Rio de Janeiro in the South Atlantic. A second subtropical depression was noted to its north two days later, which promptly intensified into a subtropical storm, receiving the name Caiobá. They simultaneously existed until 3 March, when both systems were last noted by the Brazilian Navy on their Surface weather analysis. This is the first officially recorded occasion in which multiple subtropical cyclones co-existed in the South Atlantic. On 30 March, an unnamed subtropical storm was noted far south of Rio de Janeiro by MetSul, attaining subtropical characteristics and taking an unusual west-to-east trajectory. The system became post-tropical on 1 April, east of Rio Grande do Sul.

== Systems ==
=== January ===
Cyclone Dudzai

January was an unusually active month, with sixteen tropical cyclones forming and seven of them being named, the highest number since 2021. Out of the seven, Dudzai is the strongest cyclone of the month. Two cyclones, Grant and Iggy, persisted from the previous year into the current year. In the Northern Indian Ocean, BOB 01 formed on January 7, making it one of the earliest depressions ever recorded in the basin. Also, the Western Pacific season began with the formation of Tropical Storm Nokaen (locally known as Ada in the Philippines), which was named on January 15, although it originally formed two days earlier as a tropical depression. Nokaen became the first tropical cyclone to form in the Western Pacific in January since Tropical Storm Pabuk in 2019. In the Southwestern Indian Ocean, Cyclones Dudzai, Ewetse and Fytia formed, with the latter two affecting Madagascar and the former, Dudzai, intensifying into the month’s strongest system. To add on, Fytia rapidly intensified into a Category 3-equivalent cyclone in the Mozambique Channel before making landfall in Madagascar, causing 12 deaths in the country. In the Australian region, Cyclone Mitchell formed from a meandering tropical low. It then rapidly intensified into a Category 3-equivalent cyclone on the Australian scale.

Tropical cyclones formed in January 2026
Storm name	Storm path	Dates active	Max wind km/h (mph)	Pressure (hPa)	Areas affected	Damage (USD)	Deaths	Refs
Jenna		January 3–8	165 (105)	967	Cocos Islands	Minimal	None	
BOB 01		January 7–10	55 (35)	1004	Sri Lanka, South India	Unknown	None	
Koji		January 7–11	100 (65)	987	Queensland, Papua New Guinea, Coral Sea Islands	$38.4 million	None	
Dudzai		January 10–21	205 (125)	937	Mascarene Islands	None	None	
14U/05F		January 12–20	65 (40)	993	Solomon Islands, Norfolk Island, Vanuatu, New Caledonia, New Zealand	$45.3 million	10	
Nokaen (Ada)		January 13–22	75 (45)	996	Palau, Caroline Islands, Philippines	$24,000	2	
15U		January 14–16	Unknown	1004	None	None	None	
Ewetse		January 19–21	95 (60)	992	Mozambique, Madagascar	Unknown	None	
Luana		January 21–25	95 (60)	985	Western Australia, Indonesia, Northern Territory, Ashmore and Cartier Islands	$1.72 million	None	
06F		January 21–22	75 (45)	994	New Caledonia	Unknown	None	
17U/07F		January 22–29	100 (65)	998	Australia, Coral Sea Islands, Solomon Islands, Vanuatu, Fiji, Norfolk Island, New Zealand	Unknown	None	
18U		January 22–31	Unknown	998	Queensland, Northern Territory	Minimal	None	
08		January 27–28	35 (25)	1009	Madagascar, Mascarene Islands	Unknown	None	
Fytia		January 29–February 4	155 (100)	960	Mozambique, Comoros, Mayotte, Juan de Nova Island, Madagascar, Mascarene Islands	$475 million	12	
Mitchell		January 29–February 9	140 (85)	965	Northern Territory, Western Australia	$8.11 million	None	
08F		January 30–31	Unknown	1000	American Samoa, Samoa, Niue, Tonga	Unknown	None	

=== February ===
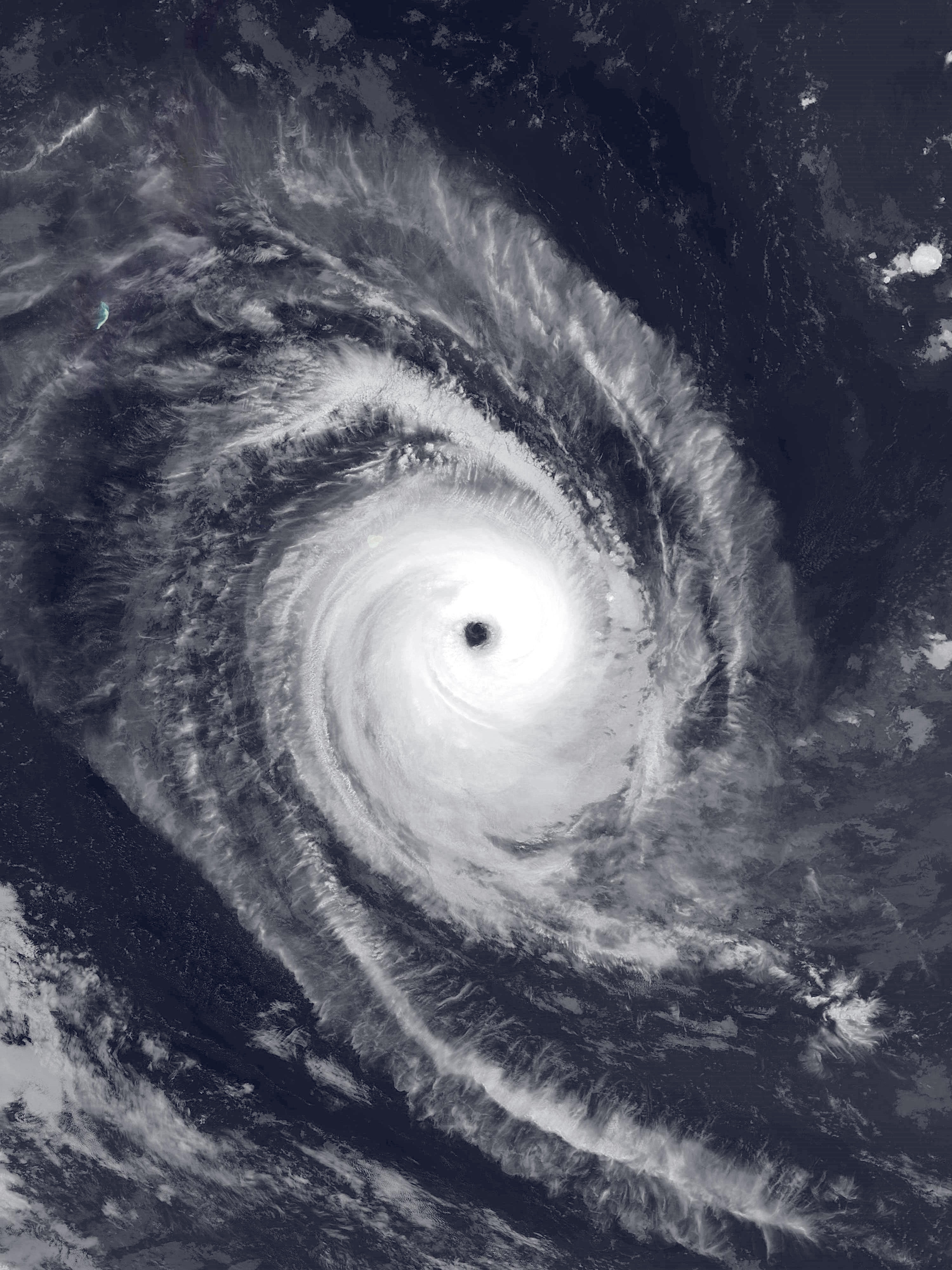
Cyclone Horacio

February was below average in activity, however, it spawned several powerful tropical cyclones, including Horacio, which rapidly intensified into a Category 5 tropical cyclone and became the strongest tropical cyclone of the month; additionally, it is also the first tropical cyclone to do so this year. Eight tropical cyclones have formed this month, with five of them being named. February started with Cyclone Fytia and Cyclone Mitchell persisting from the previous month into this month. The series of early-season systems of the Western Pacific continued with Basyang, which formed near Yap on February 2. It was later named Penha two days later, becoming the first tropical cyclone to form in the month of February since Tropical Storm Dujuan in 2021. Penha went on to make landfall in Bayabas, Surigao del Sur on February 5 and was followed by multiple landfalls in Visayas the next day. Afterwards, land interaction and hostile conditions caused the storm to degenerate into a tropical depression. On February 10, Gezani caused over 63 deaths in Madagascar. On February 24, Horacio rapidly intensified into a Category 5 tropical cyclone. In the South Pacific basin, Urmil developed on February 27, becoming the latest-forming first-named tropical cyclone of the season within that basin, breaking the record set by Cyclone Bart during the 2016–17 season. On February 28, a Subtropical Depression formed off the coast of the State of Rio De Janeiro in the South Atlantic.

Tropical cyclones formed in February 2026
Storm name	Storm path	Dates active	Max wind km/h (mph)	Pressure (hPa)	Areas affected	Damage (USD)	Deaths	Refs
Penha (Basyang)		February 3–7	65 (40)	1002	Caroline Islands, Philippines	$25.5 million	12	
Gezani		February 4–18	195 (120)	952	St. Brandon, Mascarene Islands, Madagascar, Juan de Nova Island, Europa Island, Mozambique, Crozet Islands, Kerguelen Islands, Heard Island and McDonald Islands	$2 billion	63+	
23U		February 11–13	Unknown	1001	Coral Sea Islands	None	None	
Horacio		February 18–25	215 (130)	947	Chagos Archipelago, Rodrigues, Saint Paul and Amsterdam Islands	None	None	
26U		February 19–March 4	Unknown	989	Northern Territory, Queensland, South Australia, New South Wales, Victoria	None	None	
Urmil		February 26–March 1	100 (65)	980	Vanuatu, New Caledonia, Fiji, Tonga, Kermadec Islands	Unknown	1	
SD		February 28–March 3	55 (35)	1000	Rio De Janeiro, Espírito Santo	Unknown	None	
28U		February 28–March 6	85 (50)	990	Cocos Islands, Christmas Islands, Indonesia, Ashmore and Cartier Islands	None	None	

=== March ===
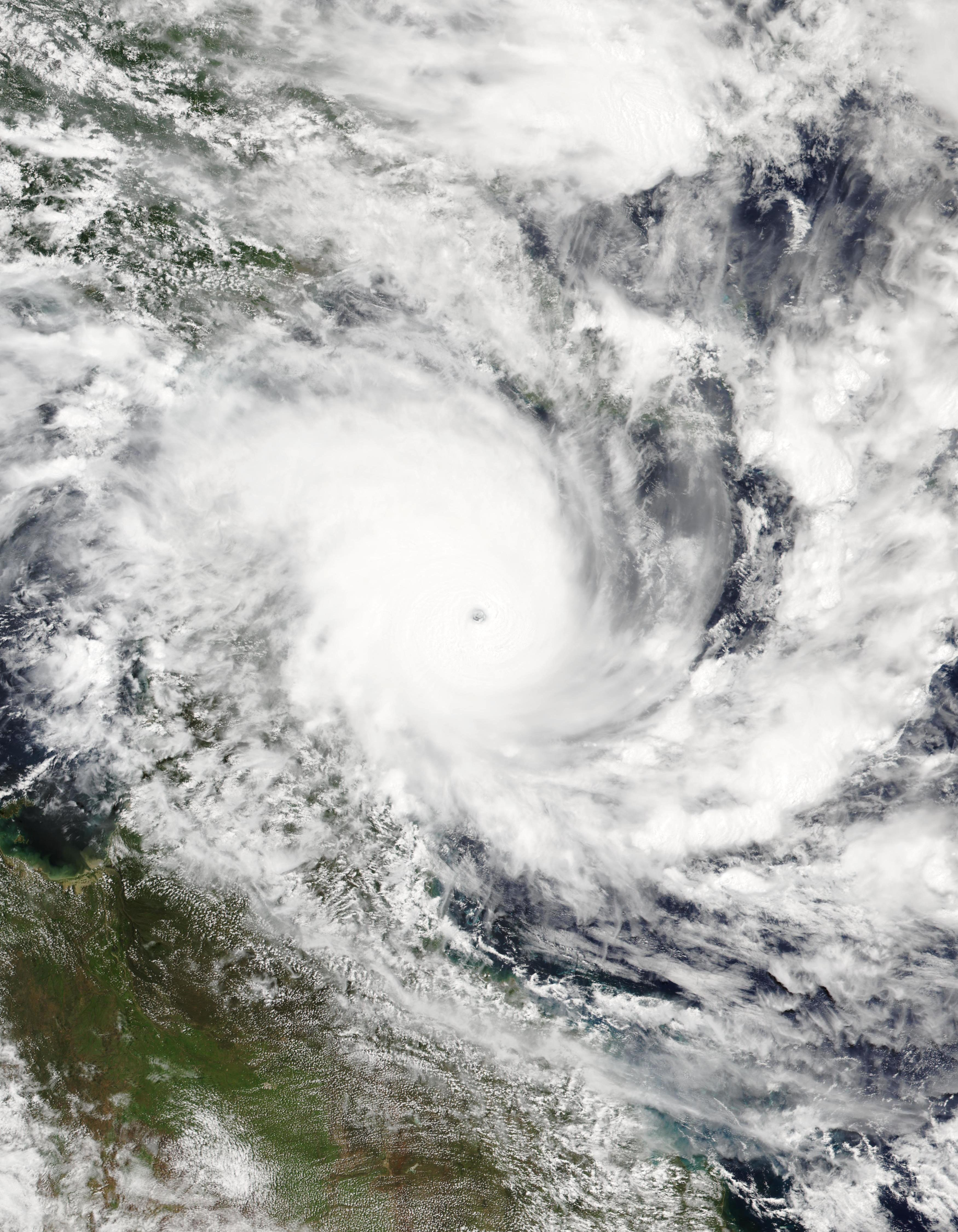
Cyclone Narelle

March was slightly inactive, featuring ten storms, four of which were named. Out of the four, Narelle was the strongest storm of the month. It started with the dissipation of Cyclone Urmil, a subtropical depression, and Tropical Low 26U persisting from the previous month into this month. Subtropical Storm Caiobá soon followed suit in the South Atlantic, coexisting with the previously mentioned subtropical depression, the first time in recorded history where two simultaneous subtropical cyclones existed in the South Atlantic. Meanwhile in the Western Pacific Basin, Tropical Storm Nuri and a Tropical Depression formed northeast of Yap on 10 March, continuing the early-season activity. On 15 March, Cyclone Narelle formed off the Australian coast, and then rapidly intensified upon its formation and naming, eventually becoming the strongest cyclone in the basin since Cyclone Ilsa in 2023. Narelle would later cross Australia and reach secondary peak as a Category 4. On 17 March, a European windstorm named Samuel, or Jolina in Germany, transitioned into a Mediterranean tropical-like cyclone before making landfall in Libya early the next day.

Tropical cyclones formed in March 2026
Storm name	Storm path	Dates active	Max wind km/h (mph)	Pressure (hPa)	Areas affected	Damage (USD)	Deaths	Refs
31U		March 1–6	Unknown	997	Northern Territory, Far North Queensland	Minimal	None	
29U		March 2–6	65 (40)	995	Coral Sea Islands, Queensland, New South Wales, Norfolk Island	Minimal	None	
Caiobá		March 2–3	75 (45)	1003	None	Unknown	None	
30U		March 4–8	65 (40)	992	Western Australia	None	None	
Nuri		March 9–12	65 (40)	998	Mariana Islands, Caroline Islands	None	None	
TD		March 10–11	Unknown	1004	Mariana Islands	None	None	
12		March 13–14	55 (35)	1002	Seychelles, Agaléga, Rodrigues	Unknown	None	
Unnamed		March 14–15	75 (45)	992	Egypt, Palestine, Israel, Jordan, Cyprus, Syria, Turkey	Unknown	None	
Narelle		March 15–27	215 (130)	931	Solomon Islands, Papua New Guinea, Coral Sea Islands, Queensland, Northern Territory, Western Australia	$120 million	None	
Samuel (Jolina)		March 17–19	80 (50)	993	Spain, Italy, Libya, Egypt	>€1 million	1	
10F		March 22–24	85 (50)	994	Solomon Islands, Vanuatu, New Caledonia, Norfolk Island, Lord Howe Island, New Zealand	Unknown	None	
Unnamed		March 30–April 1	65 (40)	1009	Brazil	None	None	

=== April ===
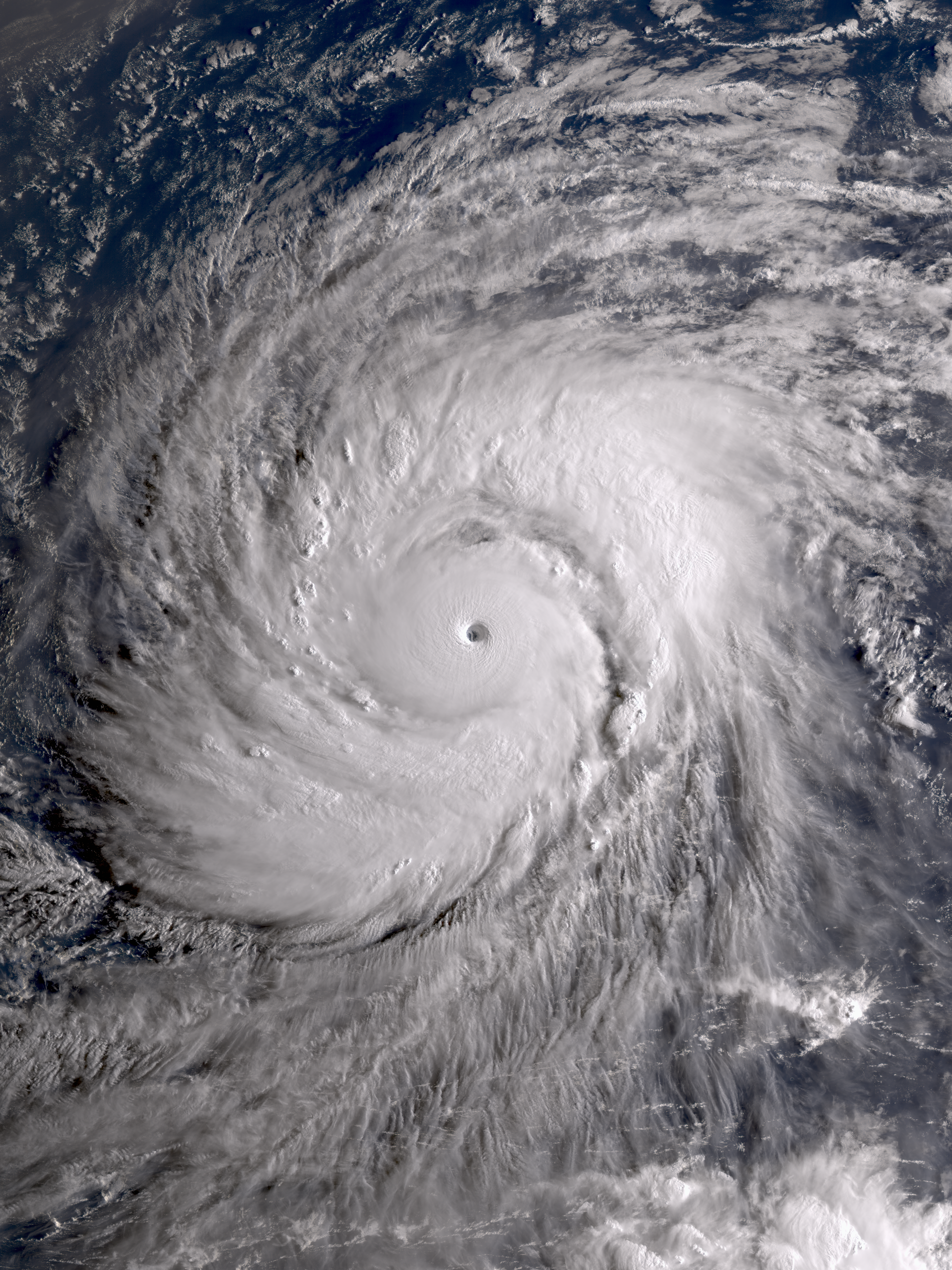
Typhoon Sinlaku

April was above-average, the most active since 2022. The month saw six cyclones forming, five of them being named, with Sinlaku being the strongest and the third strongest of the year. Three tropical cyclones formed within the first three days of the month: those being Indusa in the South-West Indian basin, Maila in the Australian region, and Vaianu in the South Pacific. Indusa formed on the first day and was upgraded to a tropical cyclone on 3 April; two days later, it transitioned into a post-tropical cyclone. Maila formed a day after Indusa and became a very rare system, having been named by Port Moresby on 4 April, the first to do so since Cyclone Guba just nearly nineteen years ago. Vaianu formed and rapidly intensified into a severe tropical cyclone, the first in the basin since Cyclone Mal in 2023, ending the longest streak of seasons without a severe tropical cyclone of such intensity in the satellite era. On April 8th, a tropical depression formed off Pohnpei which became Typhoon Sinlaku, therefore continuing 2026's streak of early-season cyclone activity in the Western Pacific. From April 13–16th, Tropical Low 38U existed in the far eastern Indian Ocean in the Australian region without developing into a full-fledged tropical cyclone. On April 26th, a subtropical depression formed south of Madagascar, becoming Subtropical Storm Juluka the following day.

Tropical cyclones formed in April 2026
Storm name	Storm path	Dates active	Max wind km/h (mph)	Pressure (hPa)	Areas affected	Damage (USD)	Deaths	Refs
Indusa		April 1–5	140 (85)	975	Chagos Archipelago	None	None	
Maila		April 1–10	205 (125)	929	Solomon Islands, Papua New Guinea	Unknown	26	
Vaianu		April 3–9	155 (100)	945	Fiji, Tonga, New Zealand	$1.5 million	None	
Sinlaku		April 8–20	215 (130)	905	Federated States of Micronesia, Mariana Islands, Bonin Islands, Papua New Guinea	>$1.55 billion	17	
38U		April 13–16	Unknown	1007	Cocos Island	None	None	
Juluka		April 26–28	75 (45)	1000	None	None	None	

=== May ===
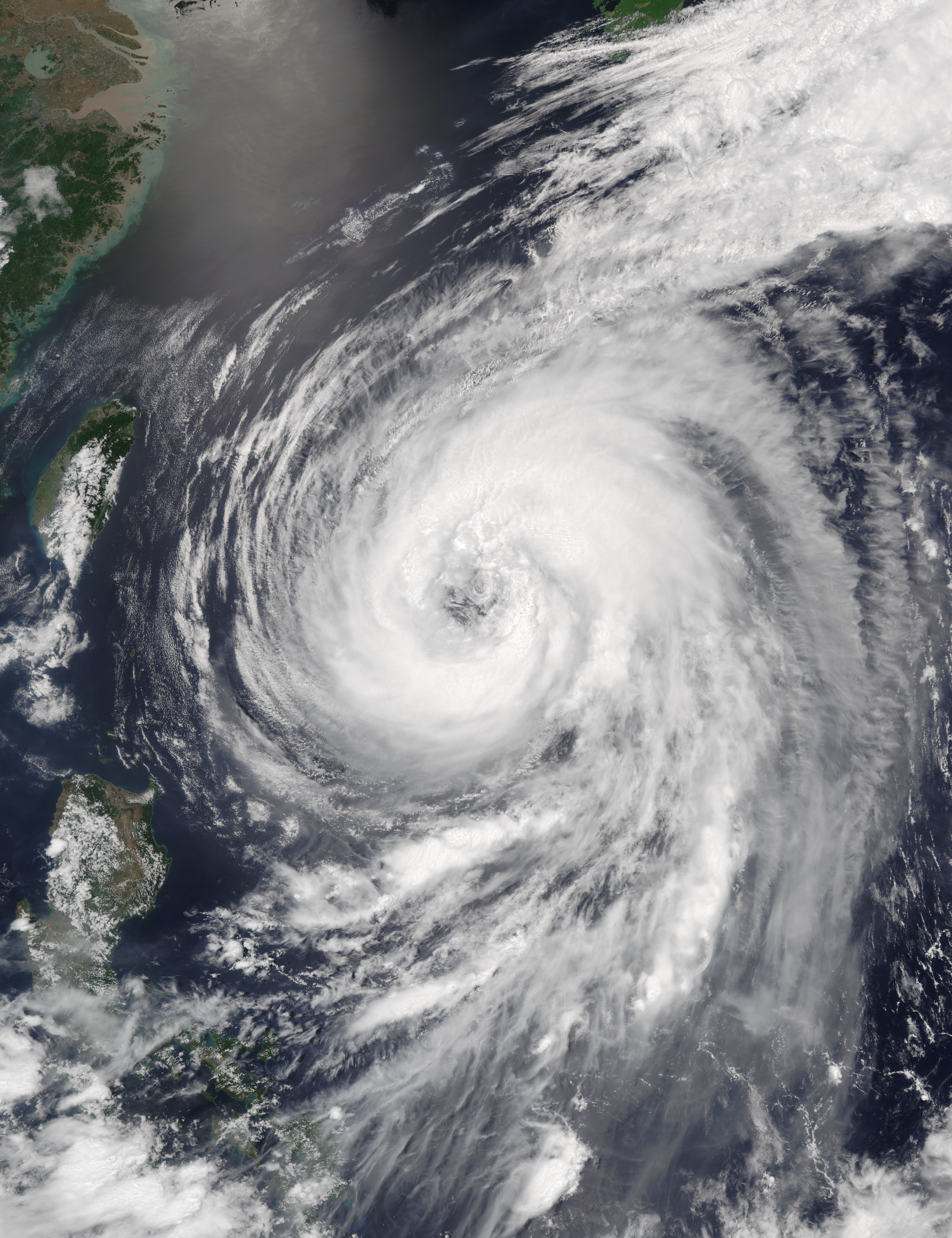
Tropical Storm Jangmi

May was significantly below-average, the least active since 2016. Three tropical cyclones formed, and two of them were named. All of them formed in the Western Pacific basin. Tropical Storm Hagupit formed in the early part of the month, and proceeded to exist as a tropical cyclone for ten days, albeit its intensity remained weak throughout its lifetime. Hagupit caused minimal damage in the Caroline Islands. A short-lived tropical depression briefly accompanied Hagupit a few days after its formation. Severe Tropical Storm Jangmi formed in late May, and went on to become a broad system with a very large circulation, persisting into June. Jangmi affected the Japanese Islands as June began.

Tropical cyclones formed in May 2026
Storm name	Storm path	Dates active	Max wind km/h (mph)	Pressure (hPa)	Areas affected	Damage (USD)	Deaths	Refs
Hagupit (Caloy)		May 4–19	65 (40)	1002	Caroline Islands	Minimal	None	
TD		May 8–9	Unknown	1006	Micronesia	None	None	
Jangmi (Domeng)		May 26–June 3	110 (70)	970	Caroline Islands, Philippines, Japan	>$3.1 million	None	

=== June ===
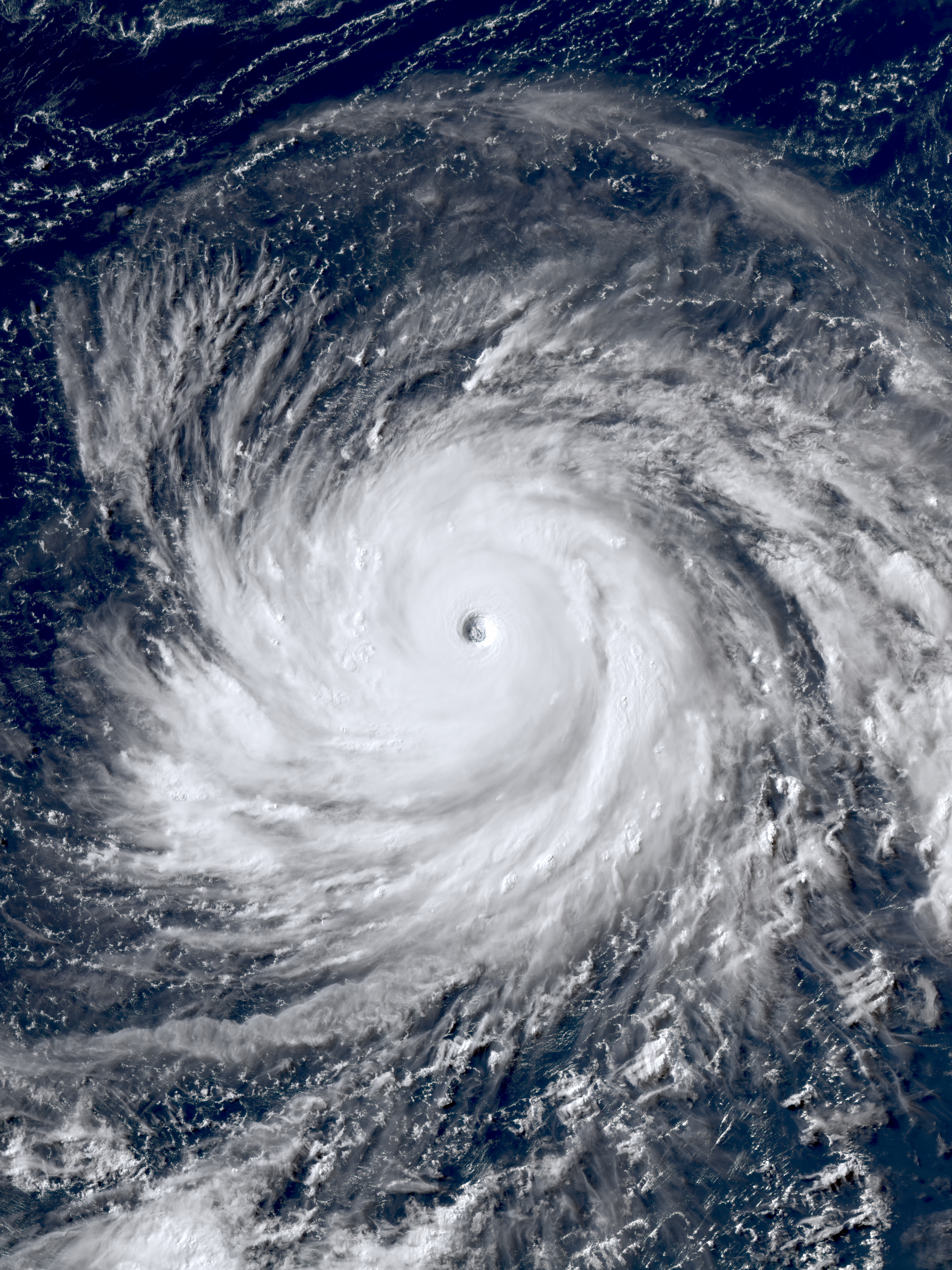
Typhoon Bavi

June was a rather active month, with nine cyclones forming within the month. Seven were officially named, excluding one system that is deemed unofficially named outside the Philippines, that being Tropical Depression Ester. The month of June began with Jangmi, a severe tropical storm persisting from the previous month into the current month. On June 2, Tropical Storm Amanda formed in the Eastern Pacific, becoming the first tropical cyclone of the 2026 Pacific hurricane season. The following day, a tropical depression developed in the South China Sea in the Western Pacific basin, being named Ester by the Philippines. Meanwhile in the Eastern Pacific, Tropical Storm Boris affected southern Mexico while Tropical Storm Cristina dumped heavy rain across Central America. On June 9, a tropical depression formed in a similar area to where Ester formed, affecting similar areas and taking the same general trajectory as the aforementioned system. On June 17, Tropical Storm Arthur formed in the Gulf of Mexico after emerging off the coast of Texas, becoming the first named storm of the 2026 Atlantic hurricane season. The following day, Tropical Storm Mekkhala formed south of the Mariana Islands, due to very favourable conditions, Mekkhala rapidly intensified into a typhoon on June 21. Early the next day, Tropical Storm Higos formed to the west of the Mariana Islands. On the final day of the month, a tropical depression formed northwest of the Marshall Islands, and would go on to become Typhoon Bavi in July.

Tropical cyclones formed in June 2026
Storm name	Storm path	Dates active	Max wind km/h (mph)	Pressure (hPa)	Areas affected	Damage (USD)	Deaths	Refs
Amanda		June 2–8	85 (50)	1003	None	None	None	
Ester		June 3–6	55 (35)	1002	Vietnam, Philippines, Taiwan, Japan	Minimal	None	
Boris		June 7–9	75 (45)	1001	Southern Mexico	$100 million	4	
Cristina		June 8–11	85 (50)	1002	Central America, Southern Mexico	>$150,000	7	
TD		June 9–10	Unknown	1002	South China, Taiwan, Japan	Minimal	None	
Arthur		June 17–18	75 (45)	999	Veracruz, Northern Mexico, Gulf Coast of the United States	$1.3 billion	4	
Mekkhala (Francisco)		June 18–27	185 (115)	925	Marshall Islands, Caroline Islands, Mariana Islands, Philippines, Taiwan, Japan, Kuril Islands	>$20.2 million	10	
Higos (Gardo)		June 22–26	95 (60)	996	Mariana Islands, Japan, Kuril Islands	Unknown	None	
Bavi (Inday)		June 30–July 15	215 (130)	900	Marshall Islands, Caroline Islands, Mariana Islands, Philippines, Japan, Taiwan, Eastern China, Northern China, Korea, Russian Far East	>$141 million	23+	

=== July ===
Typhoon Dolphin

July was fairly active and very intense, especially towards the end of the month, with thirteen cyclones forming during the month, and nine of them being officially named. One cyclone from the previous month, Typhoon Bavi, persisted into this month after forming on the last day of June. Tropical storms Maysak and Douglas formed on July 1, in the Western Pacific and Eastern Pacific basins respectively. Maysak affected the Philippines and South China, while Douglas remained out to sea. After six months of inactivity in the North Indian Ocean, BOB 02 formed on July 5, quickly making landfall in Odisha. Tropical Storm Haishen formed on July 12 in the open Western Pacific, quickly dissipating within 2 days. On July 14, Tropical Storm Elida formed in the Eastern Pacific. On July 16, another tropical depression formed in the open Western Pacific, within close proximity of the equator. On July 19, Hurricane Fausto formed in the Eastern Pacific, while Tropical Storm Bertha formed in the eastern Gulf of Mexico. On July 22, Typhoon Noul formed near Yap. Hurricane Genevieve formed and rapidly intensified into a category 5 major hurricane. BOB 03 and Typhoon Dolphin formed on July 26, BOB 03 went on to make landfall in Digha and Typhoon Dolphin intensified into a category 5 super typhoon. On the final day of the month, a tropical depression formed east of the Philippines, which later became Tropical Storm Kujira.

Tropical cyclones formed in July 2026
Storm name	Storm path	Dates active	Max wind km/h (mph)	Pressure (hPa)	Areas affected	Damage (USD)	Deaths	Refs
Maysak (Henry)		July 1–7	95 (60)	985	Philippines, Vietnam, Laos, Cambodia, Thailand, Southern China, Central China	>$3.35 billion	171+	
Douglas		July 1–3	65 (40)	1003	None	None	None	
BOB 02		July 5–7	45 (30)	991	East India, Bangladesh, Central India, North India	Unknown	None	
Haishen (Josie)		July 12–14	65 (40)	1004	Marshall Islands, Caroline Islands	Minimal	None	
Elida		July 14–20	110 (70)	990	Clarion Island, Coastal California	None	None	
TD		July 16–17	55 (35)	1000	Micronesia	None	None	
Fausto		July 19–29	165 (105)	967	Revillagigedo Islands, Hawaiian Islands	None	None	
Bertha		July 19–24	95 (60)	995	Gulf Coast of the United States	>$400 million	None	
Noul (Kiyapo)		July 22–27	130 (80)	965	Micronesia, Philippines, Taiwan, Southern China	>$639 million	14+	
Genevieve		July 24–August 2	260 (160)	924	Revillagigedo Islands, Baja California peninsula, Southwestern Mexico, Coastal California	None	None	
BOB 03		July 26–August 1	55 (35)	989	India, Bangladesh, Myanmar, Pakistan	Unknown	31	
Dolphin		July 26–August 13	205 (125)	915	Marshall Islands, Japan, Taiwan, East China, Central China	>$4.12 billion	(6)	
Kujira (Luis—Maymay)		July 31–August 6	75 (45)	994	Micronesia, Philippines	>$63.9 million	7+	

=== August ===
Hurricane Lowell

August was extremely active, the most active since 2016. The month saw twenty-five cyclones form, twenty of them being named, with Hurricane Lowell being the strongest of the month. The month started with three systems persisting from last month, Genevieve, Dolphin and Kujira. Twenty-five systems and twenty named storms have formed in August, starting with Tropical Storm Chan-hom which formed near Wake Island on August 5. On August 8, Tropical Storm Peilou formed from the remnants of Kujira, and Tropical Depression 15W formed the following day. On August 11, Tropical Storm Nangka formed in the open western Pacific. Three systems formed on August 13, those being a tropical depression in the western Pacific, and tropical storms Hernan and Lala in the eastern and central Pacific basins. On August 15, another tropical depression formed in the western Pacific, which was named Saudel shortly after, before another depression named 18W formed near Taiwan in August 17. Narra formed as a tropical storm while on Gulf of Tonkin. Tropical Storm Gaenari (known in the Philippines as Neneng) formed on August 18, before damaging Taiwan and China. On August 20, Tropical Depression two-C formed east-southeast of Hawaii, being named Moke on August 21. Tropical Depression Atsani formed on August 22, southwest of Saudel. Tropical depression nine-E formed on August 23, quickly being named Iselle on the same day, at the same time tropical depression ten-E formed the same day before named Julio at August 24, Iselle and Julio experienced Fujiwhara effect, eventually with Julio being fully consumed by Iselle on August 25. Tropical Depressions 20W and 21W formed on August 25 and 26, later named Bang-Lang and Etau being only about 500mi (800km) away from each other when formed, with their closest approach being 195mi (310km), resulting second Fujiwhara effect of the month, leading these two systems to move north. Tropical Depression four-L formed on August 27, named Dolly the same day. On August 27, Hurricane Karina formed and rapidly intensified into a Category 4 Major on August 30, before becoming a post-tropical cyclone on September 7. Hurricane Lowell formed on August 27 as well as Hurricane Karina, before rapidly intensifying into a Category 4 on September 1, before becoming a Category 5 twice on September 2, 5, later drifting north and impacting West of Hawaii. Krovanh (known in Philippines as Pilandok) formed on August 29, impacting Japan. Tropical Storm Edouard formed on August 31 as a Depression, becoming a Storm the same day, impacting Texas on September 1.

Tropical cyclones formed in August 2026
Storm name	Storm path	Dates active	Max wind km/h (mph)	Pressure (hPa)	Areas affected	Damage (USD)	Deaths	Refs
Chan-hom		August 5–15	95 (60)	980	Wake Island, Japan, Korea, Russian Far East	Unknown	None	
Peilou		August 8–13	85 (50)	992	Mariana Islands, Minamitorishima, Alaska Peninsula	Minimal	None	
15W		August 9–11	55 (35)	996	None	None	None	
Nangka		August 11–16	75 (45)	990	Minamitorishima, Mariana Islands	None	None	
Cristobal		August 12–13	75 (45)	1008	None	None	None	
BOB 04		August 13–14	45 (30)	996	East India, Bangladesh, Myanmar, Central India	Unknown	None	
Hernan		August 13–15	75 (45)	1003	None	None	None	
TD		August 13–16	Unknown	1000	Japan	None	None	
Lala		August 13–28	215 (130)	947	Hawaiian Islands	$108 million	3 (1)	
Saudel (Obet)		August 15–September 4	165 (105)	940	Marshall Islands, Micronesia, Mariana Islands, Japan, Taiwan, East China, Southern China	>$104 million	20+	
Narra		August 17–27	75 (45)	990	Taiwan, Southern China, Vietnam, Philippines, Laos, Cambodia，Thailand	Unknown	3 (5)	
BOB 05		August 17–19	45 (30)	996	East India, Bangladesh, Myanmar, Central India, North India	Unknown	None	
Gaenari (Neneng)		August 18–25	65 (40)	998	Taiwan, Japan, East China	>$18.4 million	2+	
Moke		August 20–25	85 (50)	994	Hawaiian Islands	None	None	
Atsani		August 22–26	65 (40)	998	Micronesia	None	None	
Iselle		August 23–27	110 (70)	988	Revillagigedo Islands, Baja California peninsula	None	None	
Julio		August 24–25	85 (50)	1001	None	None	None	
Bang‑Lang		August 25–31	120 (75)	980	Wake Island, Aleutian Islands	None	None	
Etau		August 26–31	75 (45)	994	Wake Island, Aleutian Islands	None	None	
Dolly		August 27–28	65 (40)	1007	Antilles	None	None	
Karina		August 27–September 7	230 (145)	940	Revillagigedo Islands	None	None	
Lowell		August 27–September 11	260 (160)	922	Hawaiian Islands	$375 million	3	
Krovanh (Pilandok)		August 29–September 8	85 (50)	985	Japan, South Korea, Coastal East China, Coastal Northeast China	Unknown	(1)	
TD		August 30–31	55 (35)	996	Southern China, Taiwan	None	None	
Edouard		August 31–September 3	95 (60)	996	Coastal Louisiana, East Texas	$140 million	None	

=== September ===
Hurricane Polo

September was rather below average, but featured several strong storms, most notably Hurricane Polo from the Eastern Pacific. The month saw eighteen systems form, of which twelve have been named. The month started off with five storms persisting into the current month, Karina and Lowell from the Eastern Pacific, Saudel and Krovanh from the Western Pacific, and Edouard from the North Atlantic. Hurricane Marie kicked off the month as it formed to the southwest of Mexico on September 1. Two days later, Tropical Depression 23W formed west of the Mariana Islands. On September 9, Tropical Storm Norbert formed south of Mexico. A tropical depression developed in the South China Sea near Vietnam on September 11, and Tropical Depression Fifteen-E formed on September 13 named Nolo later on September 23, following Norbert's footsteps. Tropical Storm Dujuan formed between Micronesia and Guam that same day. On September 19, Tropical Storm Fay formed south-southwest of the Azores. Odalys formed on September 20. Hurricane Polo formed on 20 September, and rapidly intensified into a category 5, one of the most rapid intensifications documented worldwide, becoming the second-most intense hurricane in Eastern Pacific basins by central pressure. BOB 06 formed on September 21, the same day as when Surigae formed, before an unnamed depression formed. On September 24, another unnamed depression which would become BOB 07, formed, before the next day, when Gonzalo formed. On September 27, Rachel formed, along with Choi-wan. The next day, Hanna formed, before Nineteen-E, which formed on September 29.

Tropical cyclones formed in September 2026
Storm name	Storm path	Dates active	Max wind km/h (mph)	Pressure (hPa)	Areas affected	Damage (USD)	Deaths	Refs
Marie		September 1–8	155 (100)	967	Revillagigedo Islands, Baja California peninsula, Southwestern Mexico, Coastal California	Unknown	None	
23W		September 3–5	55 (35)	998	Japan	None	None	
Norbert		September 9–15	100 (65)	996	Revillagigedo Islands	None	None	
Vietnam Depression		September 11–14	Unknown	1006	Vietnam, Southern China, Laos, Cambodia, Thailand	$1.8 million	4	
Nolo		September 13–October 11	250 (155)	929	Clarion Island, Hawaiian Islands, Papahānaumokuākea Marine National Monument	Unknown	None	
Dujuan		September 13–22	140 (85)	960	Mariana Islands, Japan	>174 million	14	
Fay		September 19–29	110 (70)	995	None	None	None	
Odalys		September 20–27	215 (130)	946	None	None	None	
Polo		September 20–30	285 (180)	892	Southwestern Mexico, Revillagigedo Islands, Baja California peninsula, Northwestern Mexico, West South Central states	>$100 million	8	
BOB 06		September 21–27	55 (35)	988	Thailand, Myanmar, Andaman and Nicobar Islands, East India, Bangladesh, South India, North India, Nepal, Tibet	Unknown	146	
Surigae (Queenie)		September 21–October 1	175 (110)	945	Mariana Islands, Japan, Kamchatka Peninsula, Alaska Peninsula	Unknown	None	
TD		September 21–22	55 (35)	1006	None	None	None	
BOB 07 (Thailand Depression)		September 24–30	55 (35)	1002	Vietnam, Laos, Cambodia, Thailand, Myanmar, Andaman and Nicobar Islands, Bangladesh, Northeast India	>$367 million	40	
Gonzalo		September 25–26	85 (50)	1000	Cape Verde, The Gambia	Unknown	None	
Rachel		September 27–October 11	195 (120)	950	Southern Mexico, Revillagigedo Islands, Baja California peninsula, Western United States	$200 million	8	
Choi-wan		September 27–October 7	175 (110)	925	Mariana Islands, Japan, Kamchatka Peninsula, Alaska Peninsula	Unknown	None	
Hanna		September 28–30	75 (45)	1002	None	None	None	
Nineteen-E		September 29–October 1	55 (35)	1002	None	None	None	

=== October ===
Typhoon Champi

October was very active and intense in terms of named storms. Sixteen tropical cyclones formed, fourteen of which were named, including Typhoon Champi, the third most intense tropical cyclone of the year and tied with Bavi as the most intense in the basin. The month started off with five storms persisting into the current month: Nolo, Rachel, and Nineteen-E from the Eastern Pacific, as well as Surigae and Choi-wan from the Western Pacific. The first system to form in the month was a tropical depression near the Marshall Islands in the Western Pacific on October 3, which was later named Koguma. Three days later, on October 6, Isaias formed, before Simon did the next day. On October 10, 28W formed, a day before Champi formed. On October 13, Trudy and an unnamed medicane formed, and then Wati formed the following day. On October 20, Agueda formed as a Moderate Tropical Storm in the South-Western Indian Ocean. On October 21, Josephine formed, before Vance did on the same day. In-fa formed on October 22, two days before Arnab did. On October 25, Olana formed. Murasu formed as a depression on October 31, before being upgraded to a cyclonic storm and named on November 1.

Tropical cyclones formed in October 2026
Storm name	Storm path	Dates active	Max wind km/h (mph)	Pressure (hPa)	Areas affected	Damage (USD)	Deaths	Refs
Koguma		October 3–13	165 (105)	950	Marshall Islands	None	None	
Isaias		October 6–10	195 (120)	959	Eastern Mexico, Alabama, Mississippi, Florida Panhandle	>$2 billion	9	
Simon		October 7–16	250 (155)	928	Southwestern Mexico, Islas Marías	>$10 million	5	
28W		October 10–15	Unknown	1006	Mariana Islands	Minimal	None	
Champi (Rosal)		October 11–25	215 (130)	900	Micronesia, Mariana Islands, Philippines, Japan, Taiwan, Eastern China, South Korea	>$32.2 million	1+	
Trudy		October 13–20	195 (120)	956	Southwestern Mexico, Islas Marías	Unknown	None	
Unnamed		October 13–19	65 (35)	1002	Greece, Turkey, Ukraine	Unknown	None	
Wati		October 14–19	100 (65)	975	Cook Islands, French Polynesia	>$7 million	None	
Agueda		October 19–23	95 (60)	995	Seychelles	Minimal	None	
Vance		October 21–30	185 (115)	961	Southwestern Mexico, Northwestern Mexico	Unknown	1	
Josephine		October 21–22	100 (65)	988	East Coast of the United States, Atlantic Canada	Unknown	None	
In-fa		October 22–November 5	185 (115)	940	Marshall Islands, Mariana Islands, Japan	Unknown	None	
Arnab		October 24–29	155 (100)	973	Andhra Pradesh, Odisha, Chhattisgarh, Nepal	>$550 million	26+	
Olana		October 25–27	75 (45)	1000	None	None	None	
03B		October 26–28	65 (40)	1007	East India, South India	None	None	
Murasu		October 31–November 4	100 (65)	986	Andhra Pradesh, Tamil Nadu, Telangana	>$203 million	17+	

=== November ===
Cyclone Xavier

So far, a total of seven systems have formed in November with four of them being named. Two systems that formed during October persisted into November, those being In-fa and Murasu. In November 5, Cempaka formed in Western Pacific while Tropical Depression 02 formed in Southwestern Indian Ocean. On November 6, Tropical Storm Pena formed. On November 15, Cyclone Xavier was named and rapidly intensified into a Category 4, while Akvan formed in the Bay of Bengal. A day later, 01U formed in the Australian region.

Tropical cyclones formed in November 2026
Storm name	Storm path	Dates active	Max wind km/h (mph)	Pressure (hPa)	Areas affected	Damage (USD)	Deaths	Refs
Cempaka (Samuel)		November 5–11	155 (100)	955	Mariana Islands, Japan	Minimal	None	
02		November 5–8	65 (40)	1003	Agaléga, Madagascar	None	None	
Pena		November 6–12	95 (60)	996	None	None	None	
Xavier		November 12–22	220 (140)	910	Cook Islands	Unknown	None	
TD		November 13–14	Unknown	1008	None	None	None	
Akvan		November 15–20	95 (60)	998	Odisha, West Bengal, Jharkhand, Bangladesh	Unknown	None	
01U		November 16–21	65 (40)	1003	Indonesia	None	None	

== Global effects ==
There are a total of seven tropical cyclone basins that tropical cyclones typically form in. In this table, data from all these basins are added.

Season name		Areas affected	Systems formed	Named storms	Hurricane-force tropical cyclones	Damage (2026 USD)	Deaths	Refs
Northern Hemisphere
North Atlantic Ocean (Note: The wind speeds for this tropical cyclone/basin are based on the Saffir Simpson Scale which uses 1-minute sustained winds.)		Veracruz, Northern Mexico, Gulf Coast of the United States	10	10	1	>$3.84 billion	13	
Eastern and Central Pacific Ocean		Southern Mexico, Central America, Hawaiian Islands	25	24	13	>$918.15 million	39 (1)	
Western Pacific Ocean (Note: Only systems that formed either before or on December 31, 2026 are counted in the seasonal totals.)		Philippines, China, Taiwan, Hong Kong, Macau, Vietnam, Japan, Korean Peninsula, Russian Far East, Palau, Marshall Islands, Federated States of Micronesia, Northern Mariana Islands, Guam, Papua New Guinea	46, 2 unofficial	32	15	$10.55 billion	340 (12)	
North Indian Ocean (Note: The wind speeds for this tropical cyclone/basin are based on the IMD Scale which uses 3-minute sustained winds.)		Sri Lanka, India, Bangladesh, Myanmar	9, 1 unofficial	3	2	$550 million	190	
Mediterranean and Black Seas		Spain, Italy, Greece, Libya, Egypt, Syria, Ukraine, Palestine, Israel, Jordan, Cyprus	3	3	—N/a	>$1.16 million	2	
Southern Hemisphere
South-West Indian Ocean	January – June (Note: Only systems that formed either on or after January 1, 2026 are counted in the seasonal totals.) (Note: The wind speeds for this tropical cyclone are based on Météo-France, which uses wind gusts.)	Mascarene Islands, Mauritius, Réunion, Rodrigues, Mozambique, Comoros, Mayotte, Madagascar, Seychelles, Tanzania, Kenya, Juan de Nova Island, Europa Island, Crozet Islands, Kerguelen Islands, Heard Island and McDonald Islands, Chagos Archipelago, Saint Paul and Amsterdam Islands, Agaléga	9, 1 unofficial	7	5	$2.475 billion	75	
South-West Indian Ocean	July – December	Seychelles	2	2	—N/a	Unknown	Unknown	
Australian region	January – June	Christmas Island, Cocos Island, Indonesia, Australia, Papua New Guinea, Coral Sea Islands Solomon Islands, Norfolk Island, Lord Howe Island	17	6	4	>$168.23 million	26	
Australian region	July – December	Indonesia	1	—N/a	—N/a	Unknown	Unknown	
South Pacific Ocean	January – June	Vanuatu, New Caledonia, New Zealand, Tonga, Niue, Fiji, American Samoa, Kermadec Islands, Norfolk Island, French Polynesia	5, 1 unofficial	2	2	$46.8 million	11	
South Pacific Ocean	July – December	Cook Islands	2	2	2	Unknown	Unknown	
South Atlantic Ocean		Brazil	3	2	—N/a	Unknown	Unknown	
Worldwide		(See above)	132 (Note: The sum of the number of systems in each basin will not equal the number shown as the total. This is because when systems move between basins, it creates a discrepancy in the actual number of systems.)	93	44	$18.55 billion	695 (13)	

== See also ==
- Tropical cyclones by year
- List of earthquakes in 2026
- Tornadoes in 2026
- Weather of 2026
