= Typhoon Saudel (2026) =

Pacific typhoon in 2026

Typhoon Saudel (Obet)
- Saudel at its peak intensity approaching the Daitō Islands on August 24

Meteorological history
- Formed: August 15, 2026
- Remnant low: September 4, 2026
- Dissipated: September 5, 2026
- Duration: 3 weeks and 1 day (2 weeks and 6 days while tropical)

Very strong typhoon
- 10-minute sustained (JMA)
- Highest winds: 165 km/h (105 mph)
- Lowest pressure: 940 hPa (mbar); 27.76 inHg

Category 4-equivalent typhoon
- 1-minute sustained (SSHWS/JTWC)
- Highest winds: 215 km/h (130 mph)
- Lowest pressure: 945 hPa (mbar); 27.91 inHg

Overall effects
- Fatalities: 20+
- Injuries: 2+
- Missing: 1+
- Damage: ≥$104 million (2026 USD)
- Areas affected: Micronesia, Mariana Islands, Japan (particularly Bonin Islands, Daitō Islands, Ryukyu Islands), East China, South China
- Part of the 2026 Pacific typhoon season

Typhoon Saudel (Note: The name Saudel (Pohnpeian: Saudel, [sʲɐutel]) was contributed by the Federated States of Micronesia and refers to a title of Chief Soudelor's trusted guard or soldier in Pohnpeian.), also known in the Philippines as Typhoon Obet, was a considerably powerful and very long-lived tropical cyclone that impacted a large swath of Eastern and Southern China, as well as the Ryukyu Islands of Japan in late August and early September 2026. The eighteenth named storm and sixth typhoon of the 2026 Pacific typhoon season, Saudel originated from a disturbance near Palikir, Micronesia. On August 15, the JMA noted that the disturbance intensified into a tropical depression then the JMA downgraded the system to a low pressure area hours later. However, the following day, the JMA upgraded the system back to a tropical depression. On August 18, the JTWC classified the system as a depression, giving it the designation 17W. The following day, the JMA upgraded the system to a tropical storm, assigning it the name Saudel.

== Meteorological history ==
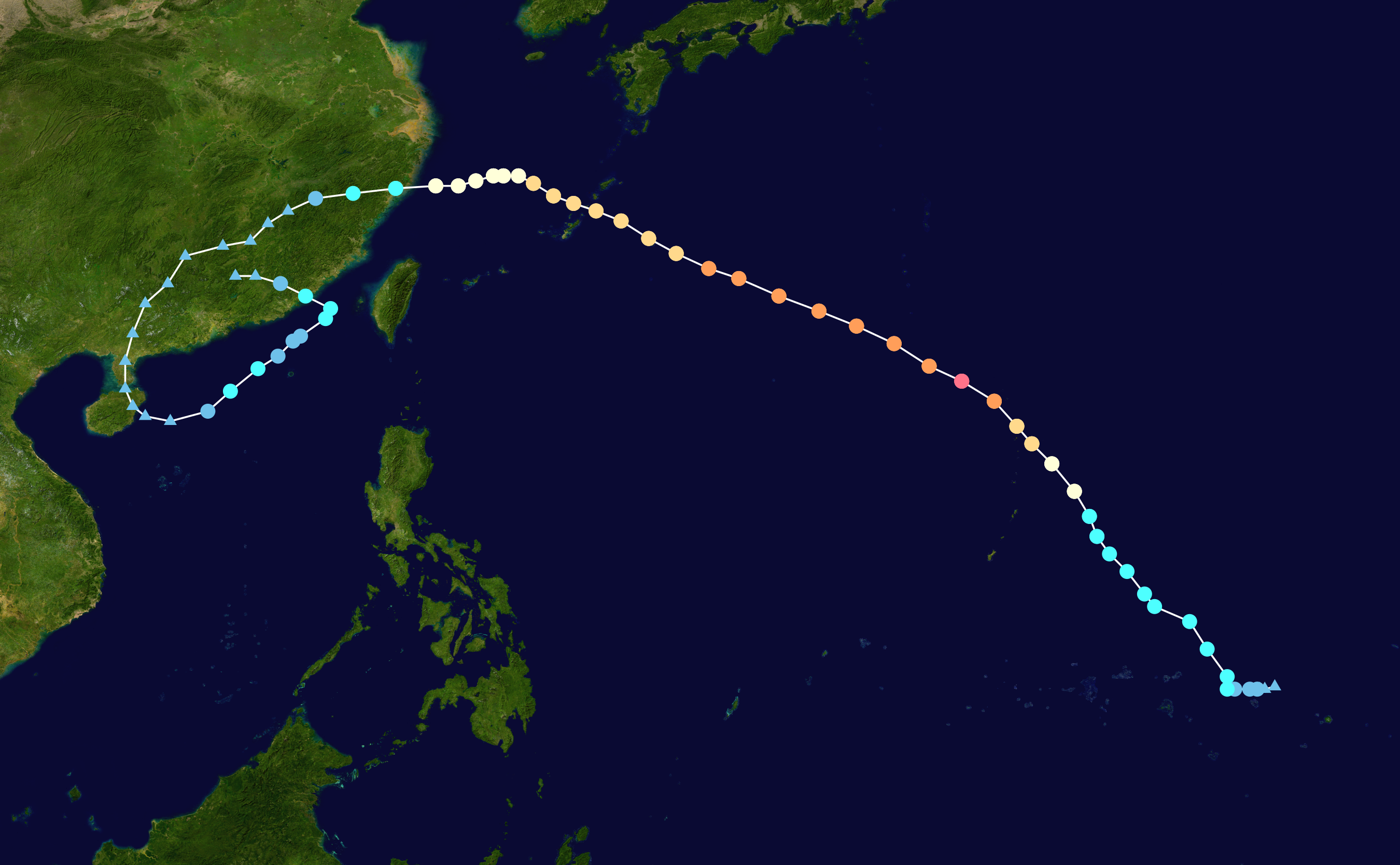
Map plotting the storm's track and intensity, according to the Saffir–Simpson scale Map key Saffir–Simpson scale Tropical depression (≤38 mph, ≤62 km/h) Tropical storm (39–73 mph, 63–118 km/h) Category 1 (74–95 mph, 119–153 km/h) Category 2 (96–110 mph, 154–177 km/h) Category 3 (111–129 mph, 178–208 km/h) Category 4 (130–156 mph, 209–251 km/h) Category 5 (≥157 mph, ≥252 km/h) Unknown Storm type Tropical cyclone Subtropical cyclone Extratropical cyclone, remnant low, tropical disturbance, or monsoon depression

=== Formation, peak and initial landfall ===
On August 15, the JMA noted that a tropical depression formed near Palikir, Micronesia, though they downgraded it back to a low-pressure area 12 hours later. The following day, the JMA classified it as a tropical depression again. On the morning of August 18, the JTWC also upgraded its chances to high and issued a TCFA. Later that day, the JTWC classified the system as a depression, giving it the designation 17W. The following day at 03:00 UTC, the JMA upgraded the system to a tropical storm, assigning it the name Saudel. The JTWC followed suit later that day, upgrading the system to a tropical storm. On August 20, the JMA upgraded the system to a severe tropical storm. The following day, both the JMA and JTWC upgraded Saudel to a typhoon after it underwent rapid intensification. Saudel peaked with 1 minute winds of 209 km/h (130 mph) and a pressure of 940 hPa (mbar). After its peak intensity, Saudel began gradually weakening, soon losing category 4 status. On August 24, Saudel entered the PAR, leading PAGASA to name the system Obet. On August 28, Saudel made two landfalls over China's Zhejiang province, the first over Yuhuan at 08:05 CST (00:05 UTC), and the second at 09:10 CST (01:10 UTC) over Wenzhou, both at category 1 typhoon status, becoming the third typhoon that year to make landfall in Yuhuan, after Typhoons Bavi and Dolphin. Later that day, the JMA downgraded the system to a tropical depression..

Saudel making landfall on August 28 2026 in Wenzhou

=== Regeneration and final landfall ===
Saudel eventually exited back out into the South China Sea on August 30 and the JMA issued a gale warning. The following day, the JTWC recognized its remnants, whilst stating that it had a low chance of redevelopment. Later that day, the JTWC upgraded it to medium chance, as its structure began to organize. The JMA upgraded Saudel back into a tropical storm after exiting out to the South China Sea. On the morning of September 1, the JTWC issued a TCFA for the system. Later that day, JTWC resumed advisories on the system, as it upgraded Saudel to a tropical storm, before downgrading it back to a tropical depression the following day. The next day, the JTWC upgraded Saudel once again to a tropical storm. At 06:30 CST on September 3 (21:30 UTC on September 2), Saudel made its third and final landfall over Zhangzhou, Fujian. It weakened into a remnant low the following day.

== Preparations ==
=== Philippines ===
While it was outside the PAR, PAGASA began issuing a tropical cyclone advisory in anticipation of its entry.

=== Hong Kong and Macau ===
On August 31, as Saudel began regenerating, the Hong Kong Observatory issued the Standby Signal No. 1 at 18:10 HKT (10:10 UTC). The Meteorological and Geophysical Bureau of Macau followed suit at 18:30 MST (10:30 UTC).

== Impacts ==
=== Philippines ===
While the core of Saudel stayed well north of the archipelago, its massive circulation significantly enhanced the southwest monsoon (habagat). This interaction severely exacerbated the 2026 Philippine floods, leading to torrential rainfall across Luzon. The torrential rainfall led to widespread infrastructure failure, river swells, and deadly landslides across Central Luzon, Benguet, and Metro Manila, contributing heavily to agricultural damages recorded nationwide during August 2026.

=== Japan ===
While moving through the East China Sea, Saudel tracked close to Japan's southwestern islands, bringing severe weather, localized destruction, and heavy coastal seas to the region. Saudel left three people injured in Okinawa Prefecture, Japan, and 268 flights to airports in the Ryukyu Islands and Okinawa's Naha Airport were cancelled. Local ferry services connecting peripheral islands to mainland Okinawa were also suspended until sea conditions normalized.

=== Taiwan ===
As Saudel gradually approached Taiwan , the Central Weather Administration of the Ministry of Transportation and Communications issued a maritime typhoon warning in the morning on August 27, which was subsequently lifted on August 28. On September 2, affected by the outer circulation of Saudel, the Central Weather Administration issued a heavy rain warning for the south and southeast.

=== China ===
Saudel made its first landfall along the coast of Yuhuan, its second landfall in Wenzhou, and its third landfall in Fujian after its regeneration, causing a total of 247,000 residents in Fujian to evacuate.

== See also ==
- Weather of 2026
- Tropical cyclones in 2026
