= Tropical Storm Narra =

Pacific tropical storm in 2026

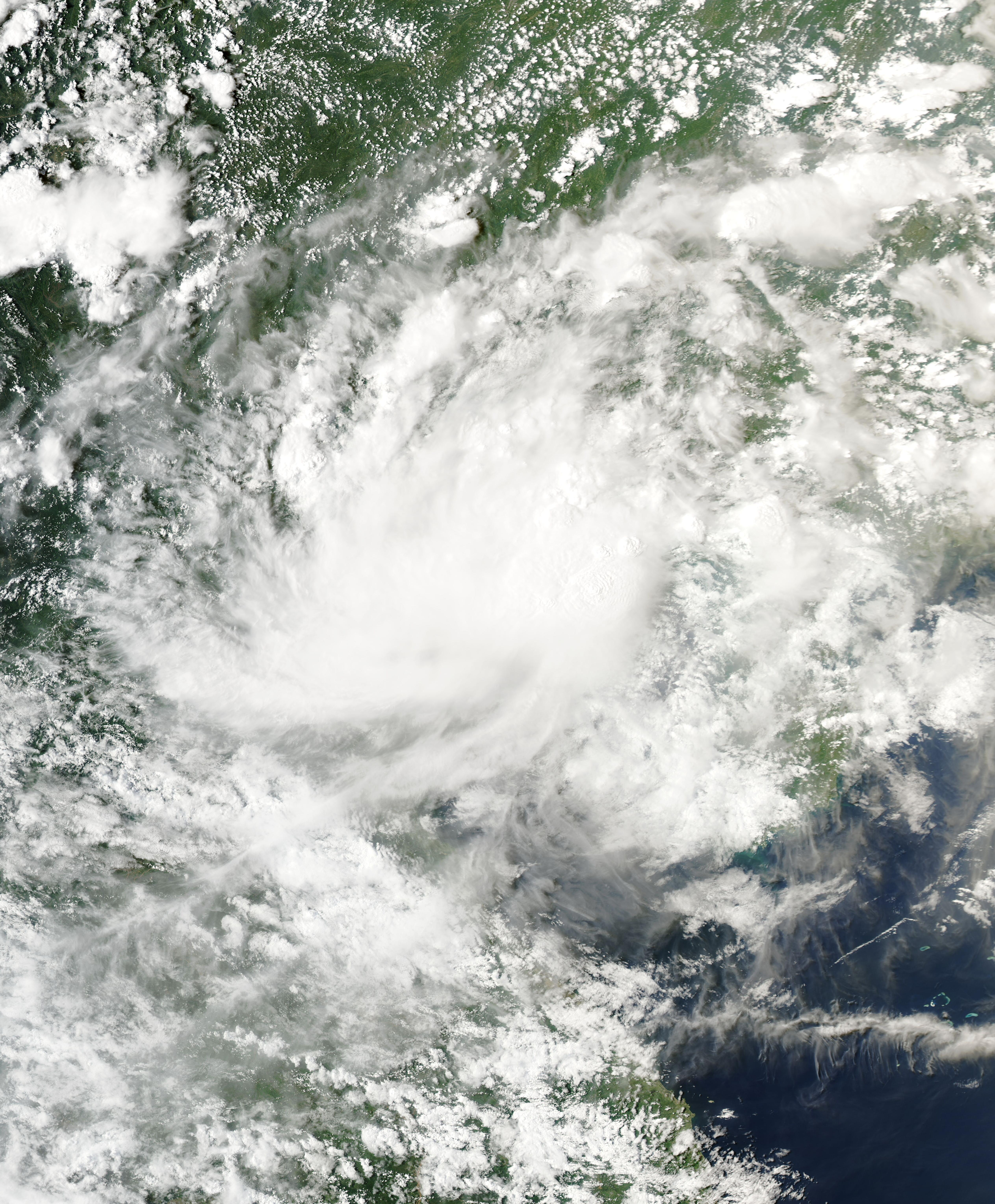
- Narra over Gulf of Tonkin at its peak intensity on August 22

Meteorological history
- Formed: August 17, 2026
- Dissipated: August 27, 2026

Tropical storm
- 10-minute sustained (JMA)
- Highest winds: 75 km/h (45 mph)
- Lowest pressure: 990 hPa (mbar); 29.23 inHg

Tropical storm
- 1-minute sustained (SSHWS/JTWC)
- Highest winds: 75 km/h (45 mph)
- Lowest pressure: 989 hPa (mbar); 29.21 inHg

Overall effects
- Fatalities: 3 direct, 5 indirect
- Injuries: 3
- Areas affected: Taiwan, Philippines, Southern China, Vietnam, Thailand
- Part of the 2026 Pacific typhoon season

Tropical Storm Narra (Note: The name Narra (Tagalog: narra, [ˈnaɾɐ]) was contributed by the Philippines and refers to the narra tree (Pterocarpus indicus), also the national tree of the Philippines.) was a tropical storm that affected Southeast Asia in late August 2026. It is the nineteenth named storm of the 2026 Pacific typhoon season. Narra originated from a low pressure area west-southwest of Cape Eluanbi. On August 17, the JMA noted that the disturbance intensified into a tropical depression but degenerated into a low pressure area on the following day. After transiting the northern South China Sea, the JMA designated the low-pressure area once again as a tropical depression on August 20. That evening, the JTWC upgraded the system to a tropical depression and designated the system as 18W. Two days later, the JMA upgraded the system to a tropical storm, assigning it the name Narra. The storm remained in the Gulf of Tonkin for five days before exiting the gulf and dissipating over southern China.

== Meteorological history ==
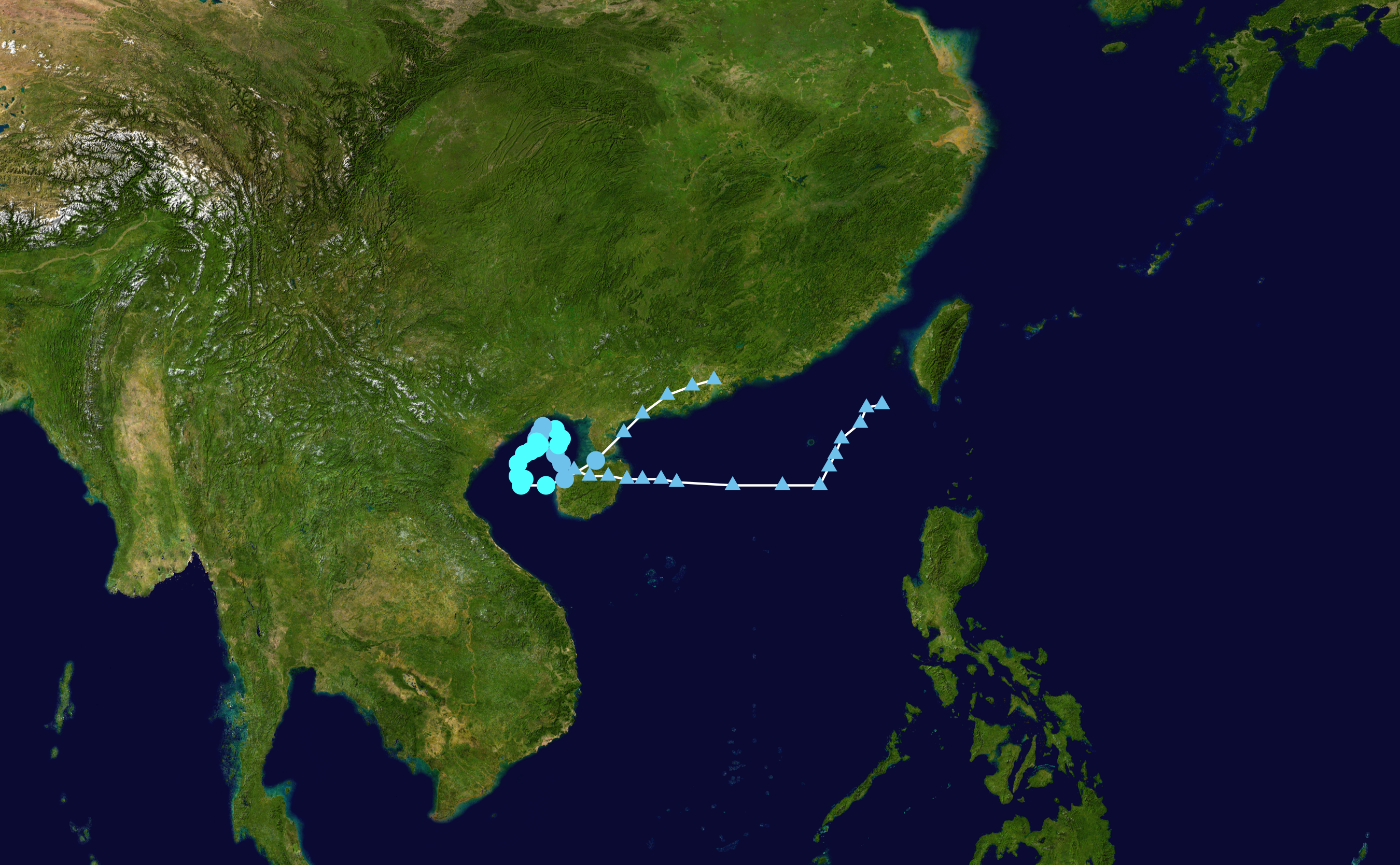
Map plotting the storm's track and intensity, according to the Saffir–Simpson scale Map key Saffir–Simpson scale Tropical depression (≤38 mph, ≤62 km/h) Tropical storm (39–73 mph, 63–118 km/h) Category 1 (74–95 mph, 119–153 km/h) Category 2 (96–110 mph, 154–177 km/h) Category 3 (111–129 mph, 178–208 km/h) Category 4 (130–156 mph, 209–251 km/h) Category 5 (≥157 mph, ≥252 km/h) Unknown Storm type Tropical cyclone Subtropical cyclone Extratropical cyclone, remnant low, tropical disturbance, or monsoon depression

On August 17, the JMA noted that a tropical depression formed west-southwest of Cape Eluanbi. However, the system degenerated into a low pressure area on the following day. At the same time, PAGASA recognized the system as a low pressure area, assigning it a medium chance of development in 24 hours. Later that day, PAGASA recognized the system as a tropical depression. After transiting the northern South China Sea, the JMA designated the low-pressure area once again as a tropical depression on August 20 while over Hainan, with the JTWC upgrading its chances to high and issuing a TCFA on the system 6 hours later. 12 hours after getting upgraded to a tropical depression, the system entered the Gulf of Tonkin. That evening, the JTWC upgraded the system to a tropical depression and designated the system as 18W. On August 21 at around 11:30 HKT (03:30 UTC), the HKO upgraded the system to a tropical storm. The NCHMF also upgraded this system to a tropical storm at 16:00 ICT (09:00 UTC). The SMG followed suit at 21:30 MST (13:30 UTC), while the CMA designated the system to a tropical storm on 17:30 CST. On the morning of August 22, the JMA upgraded the system to a tropical storm, assigning it the name Narra. At 18:00 UTC on August 23, Narra reached its peak intensity with windspeeds of 75 km/h (45 mph) and a minimum central pressure of 990 mbar while remaining nearly stationary over the Gulf of Tonkin. On August 26, the JMA downgraded Narra to a tropical depression as it was exiting the Gulf of Tonkin. The JMA reported that the system dissipated over southern China the following day.

== Preparations and impact ==
=== Vietnam ===
On August 22, the Hanoi City Technical Infrastructure Management Center began finalizing plans and mobilizing units in preparation for the storm. Fuel, backup generators, and sandbags were prepared in order to control flooding, along with measures to ensure the continuous operation of pumping stations and drainage systems. Raid response teams were deployed to clear fallen trees in order to guarantee traffic safety.

The northern provinces of the country reported significant rainfall, with many areas of Quang Ninh and Lang Son recording 300–500 mm of rain, with some places exceeding 700 mm. Flooding occurred on many rivers in Lang Son, Thai Nguyen, Bac Ninh, Ninh Binh, and Thanh Hoa due to the rainfall. 8,496 houses were flooded as a result, and 1,758 remain submerged. The floods have cut off 2,531 households due to the roads getting submerged. Two deaths were recorded in Lang Son due to landslides and floodwater sweeping people away. Nearly 33,000 hectares of crops were affected, with Ninh Binh having the most damage with 16,115 hectares.

== See also ==
- Weather of 2026
- Tropical cyclones in 2026
