= Typhoon Noul (2026) =

Pacific typhoon in 2026

Typhoon Noul (Kiyapo)
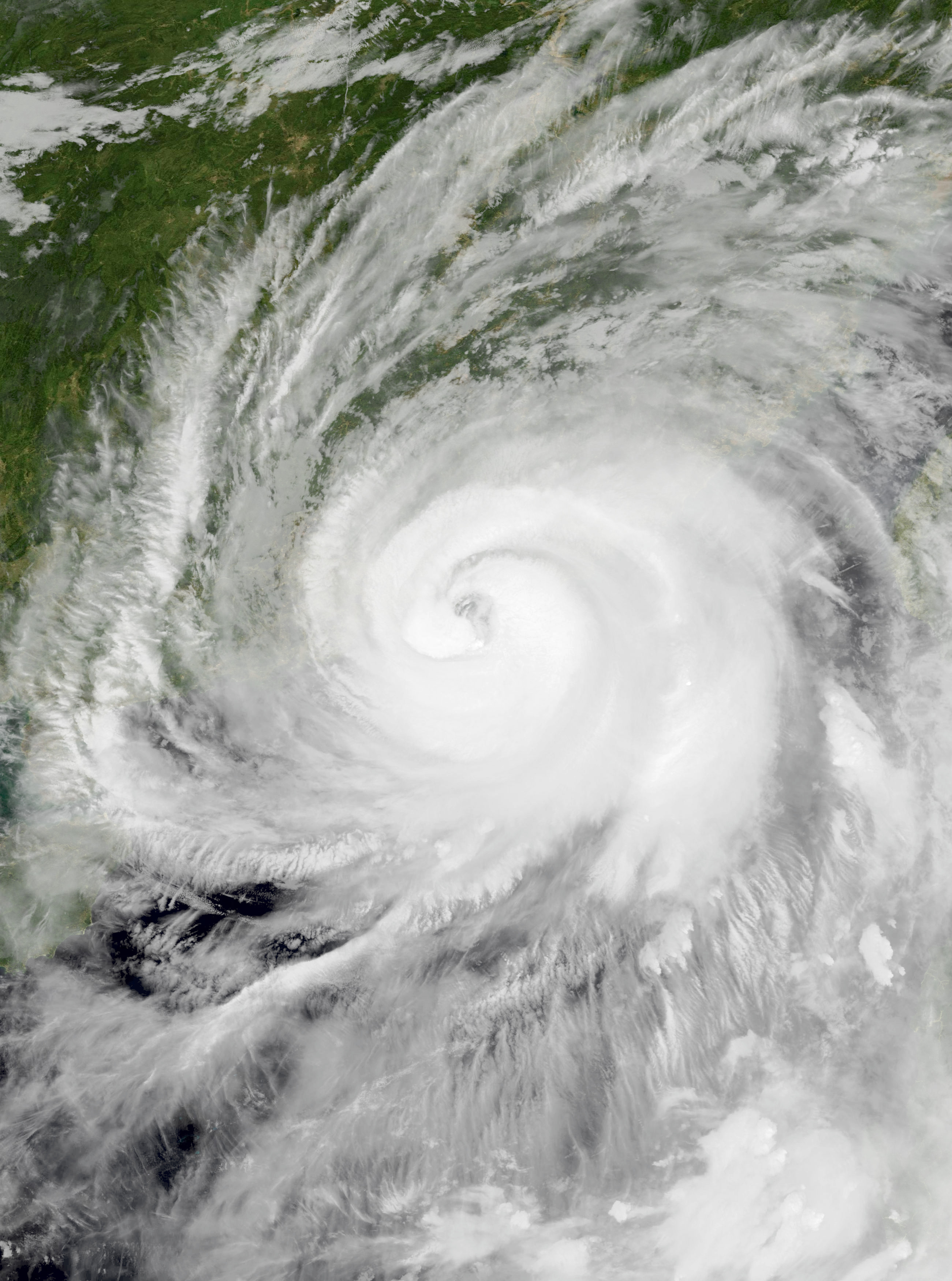
- Noul making landfall in Huizhou, Guangdong at its peak intensity on July 25

Meteorological history
- Formed: July 22, 2026
- Dissipated: July 27, 2026

Typhoon
- 10-minute sustained (JMA)
- Highest winds: 130 km/h (80 mph)
- Lowest pressure: 965 hPa (mbar); 28.50 inHg

Category 2-equivalent typhoon
- 1-minute sustained (SSHWS/JTWC)
- Highest winds: 155 km/h (100 mph)
- Lowest pressure: 967 hPa (mbar); 28.56 inHg

Overall effects
- Fatalities: 14+
- Injuries: 321+
- Missing: 1
- Damage: >$639 million (2026 USD)
- Areas affected: Philippines; Taiwan; South China
- IBTrACS
- Part of the 2026 Pacific typhoon season

Typhoon Noul, (Note: The name Noul (Korean: 노을, [no̞.ɯɭ]) was contributed by North Korea and refers to the glow of sunrise or sunset in Korean.) known in the Philippines as Typhoon Kiyapo, (Note: The name Kiyapo (Tagalog: kiyapo, /kiˈapoʔ/) refers to a water cabbage in Tagalog. It is also named after a district in Manila.) was a powerful typhoon that impacted the Philippines and China in late July 2026. The twelfth named storm and fourth typhoon of the 2026 Pacific typhoon season, Noul originated from a tropical disturbance near Chuuk. A week later, PAGASA upgraded the disturbance to a tropical depression giving it the name Kiyapo, the replacement name for Karding after it was retired in 2022. The following day, JTWC also upgraded Kiyapo into a tropical depression, designating it as 11W. Later the same day, Both JMA and JTWC upgraded it to a tropical storm, giving it the name Noul.

On the morning of July 24, Noul made landfall in Calayan, Cagayan with winds of 85 km/h. Combined with the Southwest Monsoon, it caused heavy rain and flooding to most of the Philippines, which caused at least three fatalities. After exiting the Philippine Area of Responsibility (PAR) the following day, Noul underwent rapid intensification, going from a tropical storm to a Category 2-equivalent typhoon in 24 hours. The Hong Kong Observatory issued their second highest signal (Increasing Gale or Storm Signal No. 9) at 01:10 HKT on July 26. A few hours later, Noul made landfall in Huidong County, Guangdong at around 03:50 CST (19:50 UTC). After making landfall, Noul started rapidly weakening, going from a strong typhoon to a severe tropical storm in two hours as it moved further inland.

== Meteorological history ==
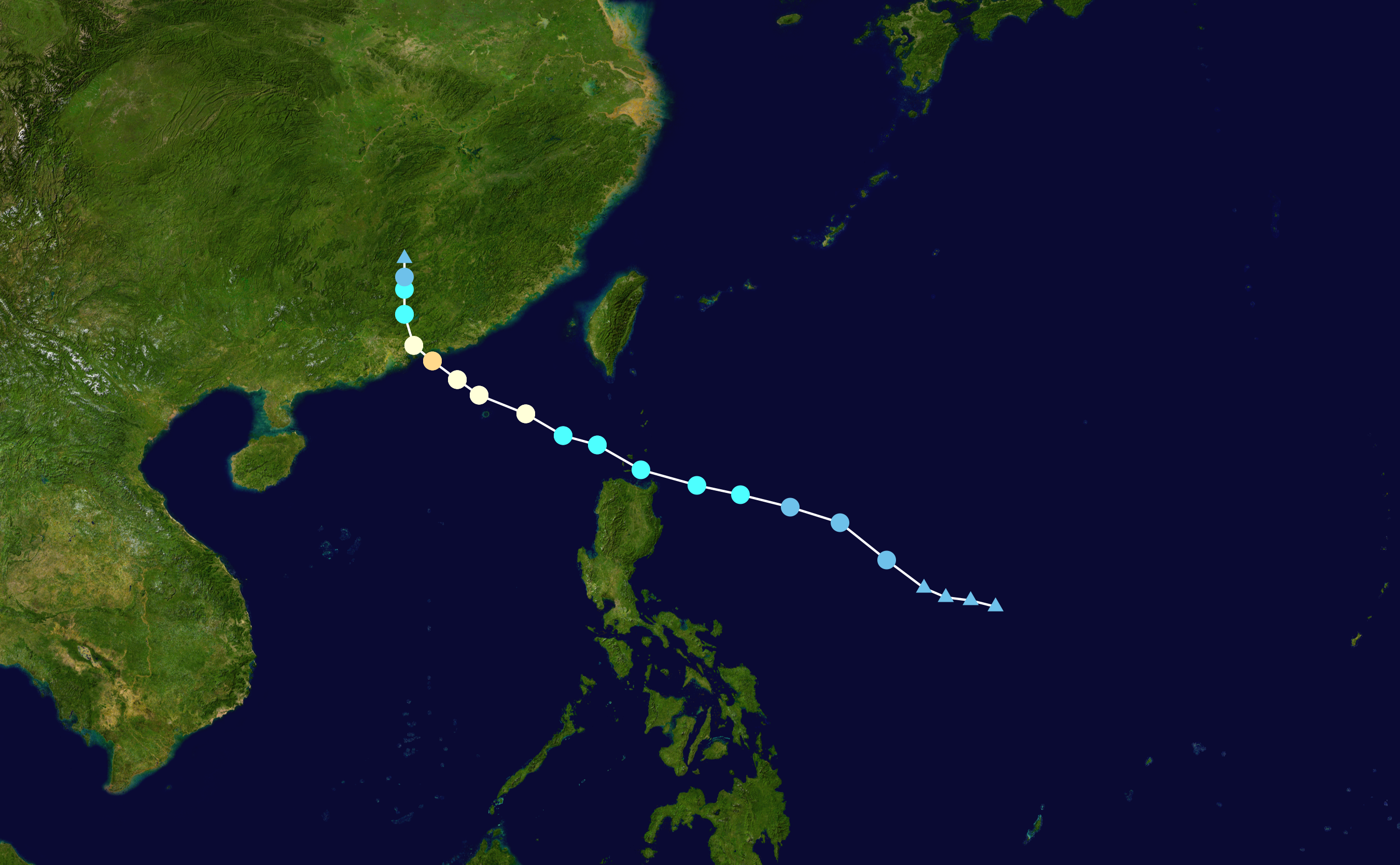
Map plotting the storm's track and intensity, according to the Saffir–Simpson scale Map key Saffir–Simpson scale Tropical depression (≤38 mph, ≤62 km/h) Tropical storm (39–73 mph, 63–118 km/h) Category 1 (74–95 mph, 119–153 km/h) Category 2 (96–110 mph, 154–177 km/h) Category 3 (111–129 mph, 178–208 km/h) Category 4 (130–156 mph, 209–251 km/h) Category 5 (≥157 mph, ≥252 km/h) Unknown Storm type Tropical cyclone Subtropical cyclone Extratropical cyclone, remnant low, tropical disturbance, or monsoon depression

On July 21, the JTWC marked an area of low-pressure that formed 253 nm (469 km) north-northwest of Yap, with satellite imagery indicated a broad area of cyclonic low-level rotation associated with weak flaring convection. On July 22, at 20:00 PHT (12:00 UTC), PAGASA upgraded the system into a tropical depression, assigning the domestic name Kiyapo, which replaced Karding after it was retired from the 2022 season. At 20:30 UTC, the JTWC issued a TCFA, citing a high chance of formation. At 09:00 UTC of the following day, JTWC followed suit, designating Kiyapo as 11W, citing a consolidating and partially exposed LLCC. Later that day, JMA and JTWC upgraded 11W into a tropical storm, with the former agency assigning the name Noul. By July 24 at 00:00 UTC, Noul was cited to be inside a favorable environment for development as it moves westward along the southern periphery of a mid-level subtropical high. Then, animated multispectral satellite imagery (MSI) indicated that the storm started to form an elongated band suggesting the cloud system center (CSC). As it continued to steadily intensify, Noul made landfall over Camiguin Island in Calayan, Cagayan the following day at 14:10 PHT (06:10 UTC). By 15:00 UTC, Noul started to quickly consolidate, with upper level convection beginning to wrap around the storm's center. Afterwards, JMA and PAGASA upgraded Noul into a severe tropical storm, showing good cloud characteristics of anticyclonic outflow. At 21:00 UTC, the JTWC upgraded Noul into a Category-1 typhoon as animated radar imagery displayed the storm's consistent eyewall, and the presence of a ragged microwave eye. PAGASA then followed suit.

On July 25, by 03:00 UTC, Noul's eye started developing, with brighter temperatures being obscured by convection and cirrus. As the storm is moving west-northwestwards, at 06:00 UTC, the JMA upgraded Noul into a typhoon, with MSI showing the formation of a central dense overcast (CDO) pattern. Three hours later, deep convection started to develop on the nascent eye, while well-defined spiral rainbands started wrapping into the eyewall. Early on July 26 at 03:50 CST (19:50 UTC), Noul made its second and final landfall along the coast of Huizhou in Huidong County, Guangdong as a Category 2-equivalent typhoon on the Saffir-Simpson scale as its intensity peaked with 1-minute sustained winds of 105 mph (165 km/h) with a minimum pressure of 967 mbar (hPa).

== Preparations ==
=== Philippines ===
Tropical Storm Noul skirting Luzon on July 24

On July 21, at 23:00 PHT (15:00 UTC), PAGASA issued Tropical Cyclone Wind Signal No. 1 in the eastern portion of mainland Cagayan and the eastern portion of Isabela. This was later extended to Batanes, the rest of Cagayan and Isabela, the Babuyan Islands, Ilocos Norte, Ilocos Sur, Abra, Kalinga, Mountain Province, Ifugao, Benguet, Nueva Vizcaya, Quirino, and Aurora. At 05:00 PHT on July 24 (21:00 UTC on July 23), Tropical Cyclone Wind Signal No. 2 was raised in Batanes, the northern portion of mainland Cagayan and Ilocos Norte. Later that day, Tropical Cyclone Wind Signal No. 3 was raised in the western portion of the Babuyan Islands. Although Noul exited the Philippine Area of Responsibility (PAR) at 05:00 PHT the following day (21:00 UTC on July 24), Signal No. 1 was still in force in Batanes, the western portion of Babuyan Islands, the northwestern portion of mainland Cagayan, the northern portion of Apayao and Ilocos Norte. All signals were halted at 11:00 PHT (03:00 UTC).

=== Hong Kong and Macau ===
On July 24, the Hong Kong Observatory (HKO) issued the Standby Signal No. 1 at 20:40 HKT (12:40 UTC). Shortly after, the Macau Meteorological and Geophysical Bureau (SMG) also issued Signal No. 1. At 13:20 HKT (05:20 UTC) the following day, the HKO issued Strong Wind Signal No. 3, the SMG followed suit at 18:00 MST (10:00 UTC). At 22:10 HKT (14:10 UTC), the HKO further upgraded the signal to Northwest Gale or Storm Signal No. 8. Over 150 flights in Hong Kong were cancelled due to the storm. On July 26, the HKO upgraded the signal to Increasing Gale or Storm Signal No. 9 at 01:10 HKT (17:10 UTC on July 25). At 07:10 HKT (23:10 UTC), the HKO downgraded the Signal to Southwest Gale or Storm Signal No. 8, this was the first time the signal was hoisted since Merbok in 2017. At 11:15 HKT, (03:15 UTC), the HKO issued the Thunderstorm Warning. At 12:40 HKT (04:40 UTC), the HKO downgraded the Signal to Strong Wind Signal No. 3. At 15:20 HKT (07:20 UTC), the HKO further downgraded the Signal to Standby Signal No. 1. At 17:00 MST (09:00 UTC), the SMG canceled all Tropical Cyclone Warning Signals, while the HKO followed suit at 19:10 HKT (11:10 UTC).

The HKO originally said they would consider issuing their highest tropical cyclone signal, Hurricane Signal No. 10 and the SMG said they would increase the chances of issuing Signal No. 8, but after Noul made landfall and started weakening, winds started decreasing which stopped both agencies from hoisting a higher signal.

In addition, at 14:25 HKT (06:25 UTC) on July 25, the HKO issued the Thunderstorm Warning and canceled it at 18:30 HKT (10:30 UTC). At 16:25 MST, the SMG also issued the Thunderstorm Warning and canceled it at 18:30 MST (10:30 UTC). At 17:00 MST (09:00 UTC), The SMG issued the Yellow Rainstorm Warning Signal and canceled it at 18:30 MST (10:30 UTC). At 05:00 HKT (21:00 HKT) the following day, the HKO issued the Amber Rainstorm Signal and canceled it at 10:05 HKT (02:05 UTC). The HKO issued the Thunderstorm Warning once again at 11:15 HKT (03:15 UTC), while the SMG followed suit at 13:45 MST (05:45 UTC) and canceled it at 17:40 MST (09:40 UTC). The HKO issued the Amber Rainstorm Warning again at 15:45 HKT (07:45 UTC) and canceled it at 18:45 HKT (10:45 UTC), while the SMG followed suit at 16:45 MST (08:45 UTC) and canceled it at 17:40 MST (09:40 UTC).

=== China ===
The China Meteorological Administration issued an orange alert, the second-highest of four weather warning tiers, for potential impact from Noul. A Level-IV emergency flood response was declared for Guangdong and Fujian provinces, including the deployment of rescue vessels and helicopters. Passenger ferry services were halted. Thousands of workers on offshore oil platforms were evacuated. Train services were also affected by the storm. More than 801,000 residents were evacuated in Guangdong. A total of 19 cities and 135 counties had issued emergency declarations for strong winds or flooding by the afternoon of July 25. The highest level of response was issued in Shanwei, Huizhou, and 10 other counties. Partial shutdowns occurred in 12 other cities.

== Impact ==
=== Philippines ===
Noul combined with the southwest monsoon produced torrential rainfall and flooding across parts of the Philippines. Many were displaced due to flooding across the nation, and at least three fatalities occurred. A total of 40 barangays were submerged by flooding in Iloilo City. In Bohol, a landslide occurred near Pilar while floods damaged a road and strong winds caused a fence to topple. About 500 families were forced from their homes in General Santos after a river overflowed. A bridge in Malapatan was damaged by flooding while another bridge faced traffic restrictions due to floods in Maasim. In Luzon, a landslide partially blocked a road in Calanasan. A bridge was damaged in Benguet. An irrigation canal in Vintar overtopped its banks, causing street flooding. A riprap collapsed in Laoag, obstructing a roadway. A motorist also veered off a road in Laoag, requiring a rescue. A river also overtopped its banks and causing flooding in parts of Batac while several huts were swept away by flooding in Dingras after a dam overflowed. A few residences were also inundated with floodwaters in Gonzaga as well as a roadway in Santa Teresita. Fishponds were harvested early in Buguey over concerns that the storm would damage ponds. The Cagayan Provincial Disaster Risk Reduction and Management Office reported about 200 people were affected by the storm in Cagayan. Flooding in Allacapan inundated rice paddies and a school, the latter of which also had its roof peeled. A biker got swept away after flooding occurred in Davao. Two other fatalities were reported in Sarangani while an additional person was reported missing. In total, 671 dwellings were damaged by the storm and more than 295,000 people were affected. The government of the Philippines issued ₱10.093 million (US$164,314) in aid after the storm.

=== Hong Kong ===
Noul made the third-closest approach of any typhoon to Hong Kong during the 21st century, behind both Typhoon Hato of 2017 and Tropical Storm Wipha of 2025 with a 60 kilometres (37 mi) approach and Typhoon Saola of 2023 with a 40 kilometres (25 mi) approach. As Noul approached Hong Kong, strong winds tore scaffolding off a high-rise building. At least 21 were injured during the storm in Hong Kong, and at least 2,000 passengers were stranded at Hong Kong International Airport over the weekend. A total of 331 reports of fallen trees were received by government officials including eight banyan trees at Wan Tau Tong Estate and another at Tai Po Mega Mall. The number of fallen trees spawned concern about the safety of residents around frail trees. Downed trees, as well as damaged wires, also disrupted rail services between Tai Po Market and Fanling.

=== China ===
According to statistics on the impact of Typhoon Noul's circulation across Guangdong Province from 08:00 on July 25 to 08:00 on July 26 Beijing time, regarding the average maximum wind speed (strong wind) during the typhoon, one station recorded wind speeds of level 14, nine stations recorded wind speeds of level 12, and Mangzi Island in Shanwei Prefecture recorded the strongest wind speeds, with a maximum wind speed of 44.8 m/s (161 km/h) and gusts of 53.6 m/s (193 km/h) – corresponding to wind speeds of level 14 with gusts of level 16. In Jiangxi, the direct economic losses caused by strong winds and heavy rainfall brought by Noul have reached ¥17.0837 million (approximately $2.5249 million).

== Aftermath ==
China's National Development and Reform Commission allocated 100 million yuan ($14.8 million USD) to support Guangdong in recovery efforts, including reconstruction of roads and other infrastructure.

== See also ==
- Weather of 2026
- Tropical cyclones in 2026
- Typhoon Dolphin (2026)
