= List of storms named Noul =

The name Noul (Korean: 노을, [no.ɯɭ]) has been used for four tropical cyclones in the western North Pacific Ocean. The name was contributed by North Korea and refers to the glow of sunrise or sunset. It replaced the name Pongsona, which was retired after the 2002 Pacific typhoon season.

- Tropical Storm Noul (2008) (T0821, 26W, Tonyo) - affected Vietnam
- Typhoon Noul (2015) (T1506, 06W, Dodong) - Category 5 typhoon that caused minimal damage in the Philippines
- Tropical Storm Noul (2020) (T2011, 13W, Leon) - caused minor damage in central Vietnam
- Typhoon Noul (2026) (T2612, 11W, Kiyapo) - Category 2 typhoon that struck Luzon and Guangdong

Preceded by Haishen	Pacific typhoon season names Noul	Succeeded by Dolphin
