= Climate change in Guam =

Climate change in the US territory of Guam

Climate change in Guam encompasses the effects of climate change, attributed to man-made increases in atmospheric carbon dioxide, in the U.S. territory of Guam.

The United States Environmental Protection Agency reports that "[i]n the coming decades, changes in the earth’s atmosphere are likely to alter several aspects of life in Guam. The air and ocean are warming, sea level is rising, and the ocean is becoming more acidic. These changes are likely to damage or destroy much of Guam's coral reef ecosystems, increase damages from flooding and typhoons, reduce the availability of fresh water during the dry season, and make air temperatures uncomfortably hot more often than they are today".

== Coral loss ==
"Warming waters are likely to damage much of the coral around Guam. Average water temperatures around Guam have risen more than one degree over the last century, in addition to the year-to-year changes associated with the El Niño-Southern Oscillation ("El Niño"). Rising water temperatures harm the algae that live inside corals and provide food for them. The loss of algae weakens corals and can eventually kill them. This process is commonly known as "coral bleaching" because the loss of the algae also causes the corals to turn white. Coral bleaching is becoming more common around Guam, including record-breaking bleaching that has occurred throughout the western Pacific since 2013. Elevated water temperatures also cause outbreaks of diseases that can harm or kill corals. Increasing ocean acidity also damages corals. By changing the balance of minerals in sea water, higher acidity decreases the ability of corals to produce calcium carbonate, which is the primary component of their skeletons. The Pacific Ocean has become about 25 percent more acidic in the past three centuries, and acidity is likely to increase another 40 to 50 percent by 2100. Over the next 50 to 60 years, warming and acidification are likely to harm coral reefs around Guam and throughout the world, and widespread loss of coral is likely".

"Warming and acidification could result in widespread damage to marine ecosystems. Guam is home to a diverse array of fish species. Sharks, rays, grouper, snapper, and hundreds of other fish species rely on healthy coral reefs for habitat. Reefs also protect nearshore fish nurseries and feeding grounds. A significant fraction of reef-dwelling fish are likely to lose their habitats by 2100. Increasing acidity would also reduce populations of shellfish and other organisms that depend on minerals in the water to build their skeletons and shells".

== Tropical cyclones ==
As the climate changes, typhoons may cause more damage. Guam lies in one of the world's most active regions for tropical cyclones. In 2002, Typhoon Pongsona caused $700 million in damages, destroyed 1,300 homes, and left the island without power. In just the last few years, neighboring islands have suffered from some of the strongest and most damaging tropical cyclones ever recorded, including Super Typhoons Haiyan (2013), Maysak (2015), and Soudelor (2015). Although warming oceans provide typhoons with more potential energy, scientists are not yet sure whether typhoons have become stronger or more frequent. Nevertheless, wind speeds and rainfall rates during typhoons are likely to increase as the climate continues to warm. Higher wind speeds and the resulting damages can make insurance for wind damage more expensive or difficult to obtain.

== Rising sea level and coastal flooding ==
Sea level has risen by about four inches relative to Guam's shoreline since 1993. If the oceans and atmosphere continue to warm, sea level around Guam is likely to rise one to three feet in the next century. Sea level rise submerges low-lying areas, erodes beaches, and exacerbates coastal flooding from typhoons and tsunamis. Coastal homes and infrastructure will flood more often as sea level rises because storm surges will become higher as well. Homes, businesses, roads, and the Port of Guam are vulnerable to the impacts of storms and sea level rise. The loss of coral reefs compounds this problem because reefs help protect the shore from waves and storm damage. As reefs die, they lose their structural integrity and provide less protection to the shore. If larger waves strike the shore, beaches will erode more rapidly.

== Rainfall and water supplies ==
"Average rainfall in Guam has increased slightly since 1950, but scientists are not sure whether total rainfall here will increase in the future. Nevertheless, Guam’s wet season may become wetter, while dry periods may become drier. Warmer temperatures tend to make both rainstorms and droughts more intense. Moreover, Guam’s climate tends to be dry during El Niño years and wet during La Niña years, and scientists generally expect the differences between El Niño and La Niña years to become greater in most places".

"Inland flooding in Guam may increase as the climate changes. Heavy rainstorms occasionally overwhelm Guam’s rivers, streams, and urban storm drains, leading to damaging floods. Flooding is most common in the southern part of Guam, where the local bedrock is less permeable than the limestone in the north. This means that rainfall in the south runs off into rivers and streams instead of filtering into the ground. Flooding during the wet season could become worse as rainstorms become more intense. Conversely, water may be less available in the dry season. Less rainfall occurs during El Niño years, such as during the drought that affected the island in 2015–2016. Thus, if the El Niño cycle becomes more intense, less rain might fall during the dry season. Moreover, rising temperatures increase the rate at which water evaporates (or transpires) into the air from soils, plants, and reservoirs, which would further exacerbate drought conditions".

"During droughts, rising sea level could make fresh water less available—particularly groundwater, which provides 80 percent of Guam's water supply. Most of Guam's fresh water comes from the northern part of the island, which has a "lens" of fresh groundwater floating on top of the heavier, saltier water. Some wells already produce salty water during dry periods when the freshwater lens becomes thinner; prolonged drought could make more of Guam's wells salty. Rising sea level could also cause salt water to infiltrate farther into the island's groundwater".

== Inland plants and animals ==
"Warmer temperatures and changes in rainfall could expand, shrink, or shift the ranges of various plants and animals in Guam's forests, depending on the conditions that each species requires. Many tropical plants and animals could be threatened by warming, as they are accustomed to the temperatures that currently prevail in Guam, which are fairly steady year-round. It is unclear whether species could tolerate the weather often being warmer than it ever is today. Some native species could be crowded out by invasive species better adapted to the changing climate, and some could face extinction".

== Economic effects ==
The current and potential damage to reefs could affect Guam's tourist industry. A 2007 study estimated that reefs' economic value may be $2 million per square mile, both on account of tourism and their role as natural breakwaters. Bleaching of reefs may lead to declines in tourist revenue, a direct economic impact.

Climate change could also affect the military bases on Guam. A 2012 study of American military installations found that Guam's were in the top five most vulnerable to climate change, due to coastal flooding, erosion, and extreme weather events.

== Policy and politics ==
In 2019, Governor Lou Leon Guerrero created a resiliency commission on climate change via executive order. The commission was given a broad mandate, intended to lead on both the issues of sustainability and emissions as well as issues of adaptation, conservation, and land use. The order followed protests at the Guam legislature the week prior, with protestors including the general public and members of the Micronesia Climate Change Alliance.

As of 2017, two studies were in progress to evaluate the effect of climate change adaptation in Guam. One involves adaptation of coastal infrastructure for tourist areas, while another is led by the Pentagon to better understand the effect of climate change on freshwater sources on the island.
