= List of storms named Dolphin =

The name Dolphin has been used for four tropical cyclones in the western North Pacific Ocean. The name was contributed by Hong Kong and refers to the Chinese white dolphin (Sousa chinensis), a mascot in Hong Kong. It replaced the name Yanyan, which was retired after the 2003 Pacific typhoon season.

- Typhoon Dolphin (2008) (T0822, 27W, Ulysses) – Category 2 typhoon that did not affect land.
- Typhoon Dolphin (2015) (T1507, 07W) — Category 5 super typhoon that churned though the open ocean.
- Severe Tropical Storm Dolphin (2020) (T2012, 14W, Marce) – paralleled the southeastern coast of Japan, remained well offshore.
- Typhoon Dolphin (2026) (T2613, 12W) – another Category 5 super typhoon that affected the Ryukyu Islands and China

Preceded by Noul	Pacific typhoon season names Dolphin	Succeeded by Kujira
