= Nascent =

Nascent may refer to:

- Nascent (film), a 2016 Central African short documentary film by Lindsay Branham and Jon Kasbe
- Nascent, a 2005 Australian dance film with choreography by Garry Stewart
- Nascent Glacier, Antarctica
- Nascent, an American record producer and musician.

== See also ==
- Nascent state (disambiguation)
