= Typhoon Saudel (2020) =

Pacific typhoon in 2020

Typhoon Saudel (Pepito)
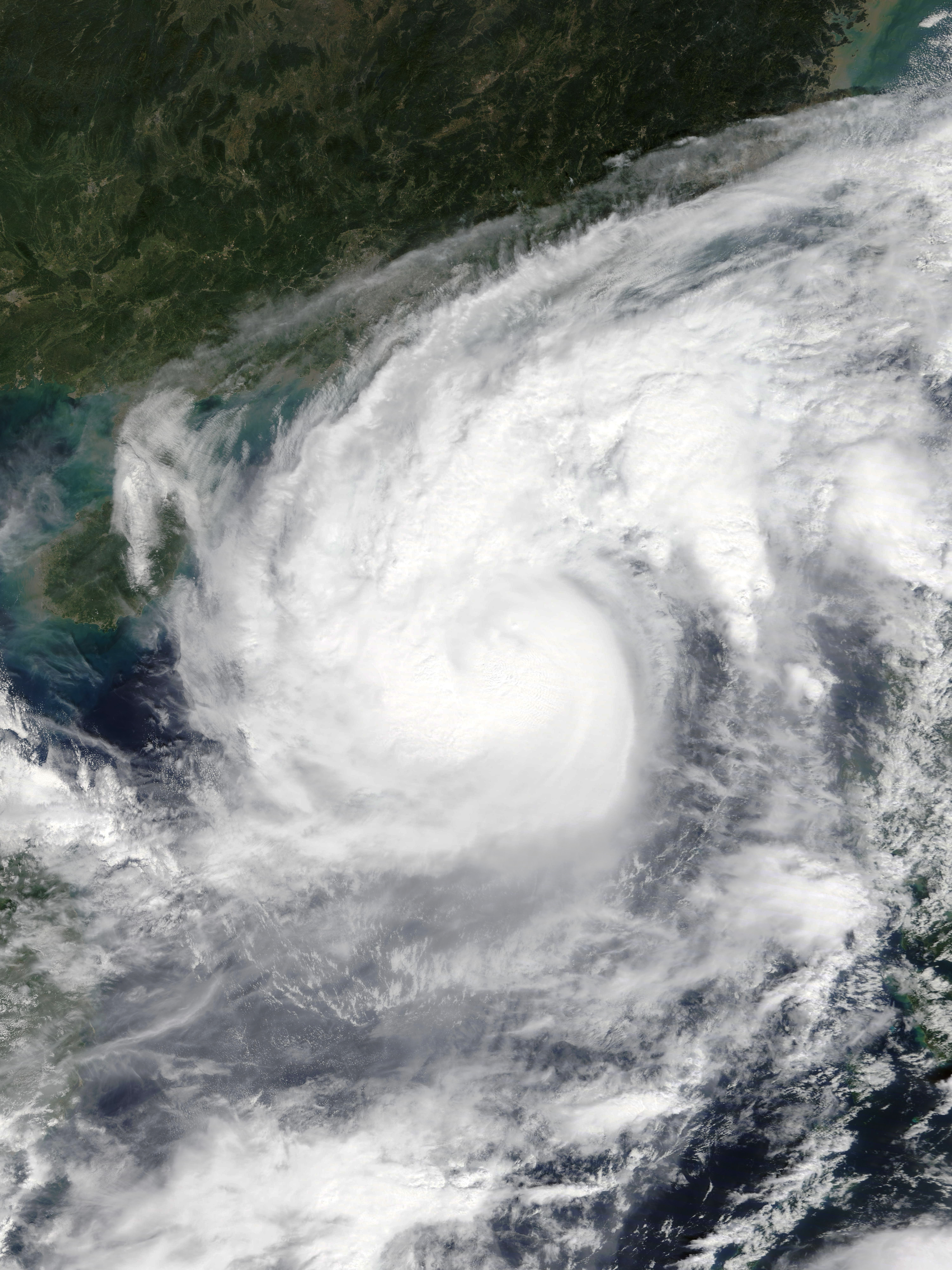
- Saudel in the South China Sea on October 23

Meteorological history
- Formed: October 18, 2020
- Dissipated: October 25, 2020

Typhoon
- 10-minute sustained (JMA)
- Highest winds: 120 km/h (75 mph)
- Lowest pressure: 975 hPa (mbar); 28.79 inHg

Category 1-equivalent typhoon
- 1-minute sustained (SSHWS/JTWC)
- Highest winds: 140 km/h (85 mph)
- Lowest pressure: 975 hPa (mbar); 28.79 inHg

Overall effects
- Fatalities: None
- Damage: $15 million (2020 USD)
- Areas affected: Philippines, South China, Vietnam
- IBTrACS
- Part of the 2020 Pacific typhoon season

Typhoon Saudel, (Note: The name Saudel (Pohnpeian: Saudel, [sʲɐutel]) was contributed by the Federated States of Micronesia and refers to a title of Chief Soudelor's trusted guard or soldier in Pohnpeian.) known in the Philippines as Typhoon Pepito, was a typhoon that affected the Philippines, Vietnam and Southern China in late October 2020. It was seventeenth tropical storm and seventh typhoon of the 2020 Pacific typhoon season. The name Saudel was used for the first time, replacing Typhoon Soudelor in 2015, which caused serious damage in Taiwan and Mainland China, the name Pepito was also used for the first time this season replacing Pablo after its catastrophic damage in 2012. Saudel formed from a tropical disturbance east of the Philippines. The disturbance gradually organized and crossed the Philippines as a tropical storm. Once the system emerged into the South China Sea, it began to rapidly organize and intensify, becoming a typhoon early on October 22.

Saudel flooded roads and buildings in the Philippines. It also affected Vietnam, which has been devastated by flooding caused by multiple tropical systems, although no damage was reported. Strong winds and high seas were recorded off the coast of Malaysia, prompting a tropical cyclone advisory to be issued. In Hainan, China, winds gusted at up to 130 km/h (80 mph). The total damage caused by Saudel is estimated to be more than $15 million.

== Meteorological history ==
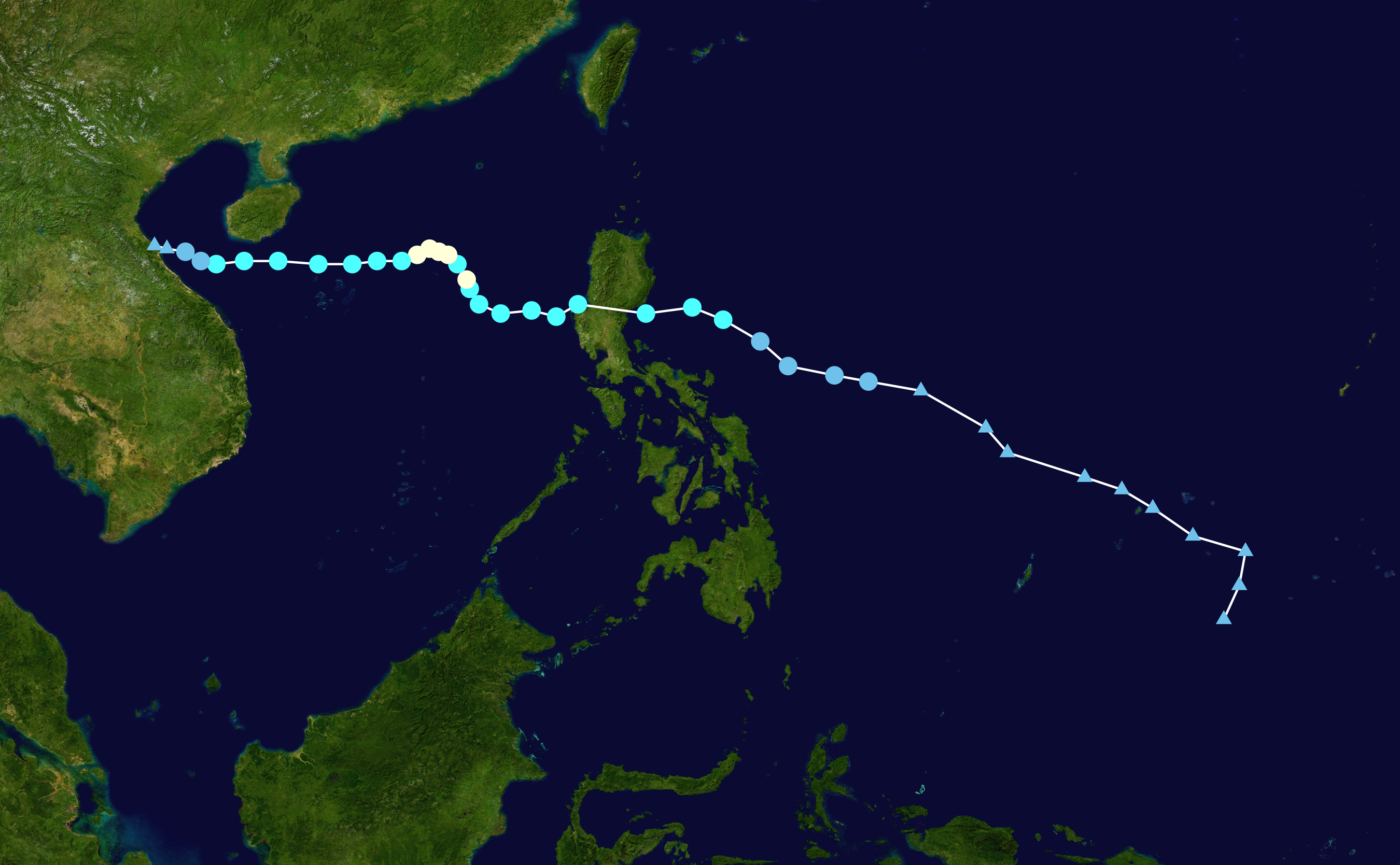
Map plotting the storm's track and intensity, according to the Saffir–Simpson scale Map key Saffir–Simpson scale Tropical depression (≤38 mph, ≤62 km/h) Tropical storm (39–73 mph, 63–118 km/h) Category 1 (74–95 mph, 119–153 km/h) Category 2 (96–110 mph, 154–177 km/h) Category 3 (111–129 mph, 178–208 km/h) Category 4 (130–156 mph, 209–251 km/h) Category 5 (≥157 mph, ≥252 km/h) Unknown Storm type Tropical cyclone Subtropical cyclone Extratropical cyclone, remnant low, tropical disturbance, or monsoon depression

At 15:00 UTC on October 16, the Joint Typhoon Warning Center (JTWC) began tracking an area of atmospheric convection, or thunderstorms, approximately 463 nautical miles (857 km) east-southeast of Palau. On October 18 at 21:00 UTC, PAGASA upgraded the system to a tropical depression, and named the system Pepito. A few hours later, the Japan Meteorological Agency (JMA) also recognized the system as a tropical depression, and subsequently issued their first warning. On October 20, as the system intensified while approaching northern Luzon, the JMA upgraded the system into a tropical storm and named the system Saudel. PAGASA followed suit later that day. Saudel made landfall over the San Ildefonso Peninsula in Casiguran, Aurora on October 20 at 13:00 UTC (21:00 PHT) and began crossing Luzon, emerging over the South China Sea hours later. As the storm left the Philippine Area of Responsibility, the developing system was upgraded to a typhoon by the JMA, the JTWC, and PAGASA in their final bulletin for the system. Saudel continued to gain strength gradually, and during 3:00 UTC on October 23, it reached its peak intensity, with the JTWC estimating 1-minute sustained winds of 100 mph (160 km/h), making the system a low-end category 2 typhoon, and a pressure of 965 mbar was estimated by the JMA. However, this intensity was short-lived, and at 9:00 UTC JTWC downgraded Saudel to a category 1 typhoon. As it approached Vietnam, it began to rapidly weaken due to high vertical wind shear and was downgraded to a tropical storm on October 24. The next day, it was downgraded to a remnant low as its center became mostly devoid of any deep convection.

== Preparations and impact ==
=== Philippines ===
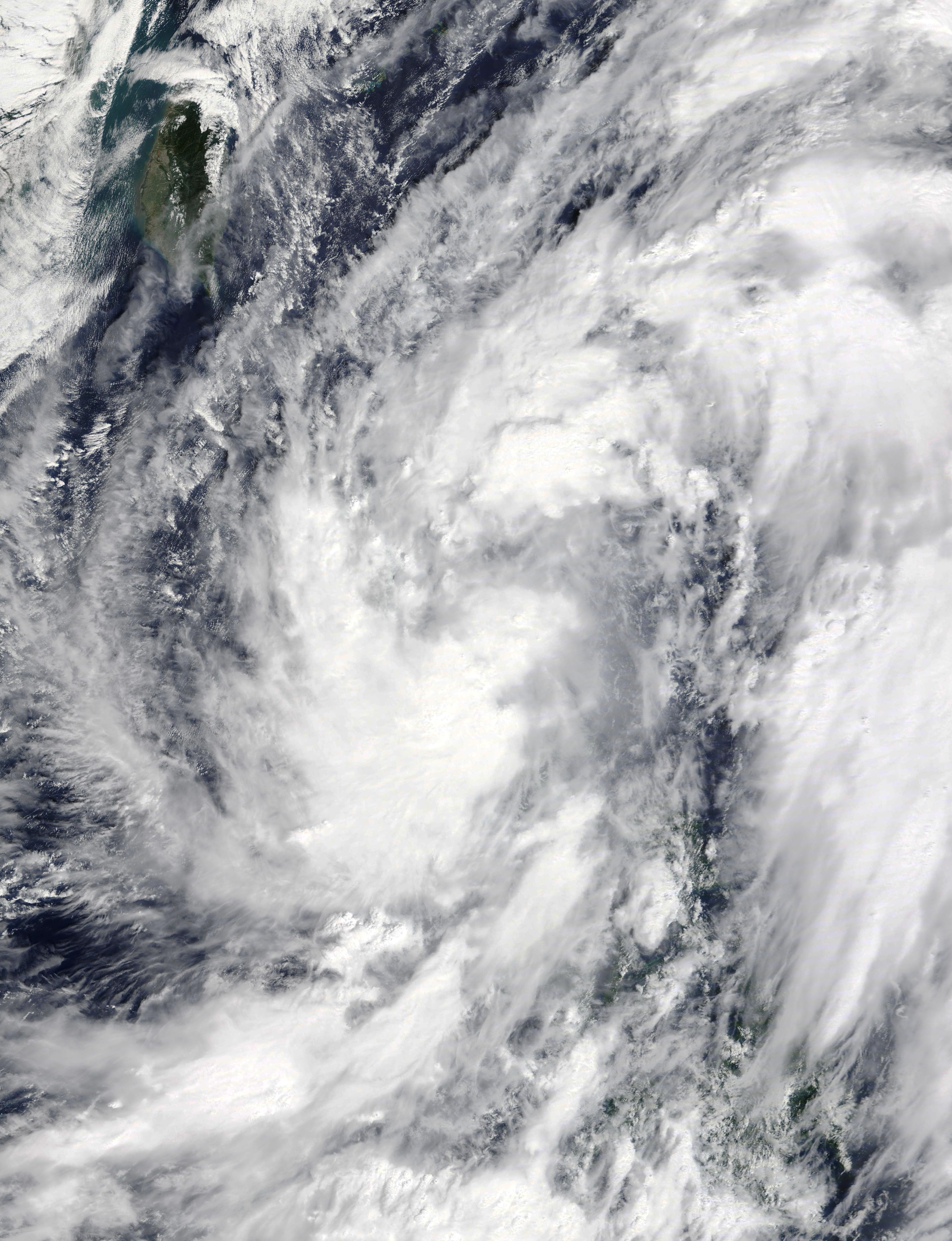
Tropical Storm Saudel approaching the Philippines on October 20

After PAGASA declared Saudel a tropical storm, the agency issued Signal #2 tropical cyclone warnings in preparation for the storm's landfall. Prior to making landfall, Signal #2 was raised in 10 provinces and in parts of 4 provinces. In Quezon, many streets were flooded and people used boats for transport. A total of 6,000 people were evacuated. 335 people were displaced in Aurora Province. Rain from Saudel caused water levels to rise in Binga Dam in Benguet Province, prompting authorities to release water from the facility. In Quezon, numerous homes and schools were also damaged. Heavy rains caused a concrete wall to collapse at the Siain Elementary School in Buenavista, Quezon. In addition, Sumulong Elementary School in Calauag was again flooded, several days after Tropical Depression Ofel flooded the school. Rice fields were damaged from floods, and many farmers lost their crops. Many bridges in the Cagayan Valley became impassable after Saudel hit.

Immediately after the storm, Provincial Disaster Risk Reduction and Management Offices and Municipal Disaster Risk Reduction and Management Offices conducted damage assessments. 13 towns, 36 barangays, and 457 families with a total of 1,576 individuals were affected by the storm. At least 25 evacuation centers were open, with 295 families or 935 individuals. As of October 24, the NDRRMC has calculated a total damage of about ₱106 million (US$2.18 million).

=== China ===
Saudel was the seventeenth storm to hit China or its territories in 2020. The storm brought strong winds on the Qiongzhou Strait, forcing ships to stop service at 05:00 UTC on October 23. All passenger trains to and from Hainan stopped running due to the storm. The CMA issued a yellow alert, the third-highest level of alerts on its system, for Hainan. A peak wind gust of 130 km/h (80 mph) was recorded. The direct economic loss reached ¥60 million (US$9 million). The storm, along with the seasonal monsoon, also brought strong winds to Hong Kong.

=== Elsewhere ===
Vietnam was already dealing with severe flooding from tropical systems Linfa, Nangka, and Ofel when Typhoon Saudel affected the region.

The storm also caused strong winds and rough seas over waters off the Malaysian state of Sabah, where the Malaysian Meteorological Department (MetMalaysia) had issued a tropical storm advisory, with the storm being around 1,315 kilometers northwest of Kudat.

== See also ==
- Weather of 2020
- Tropical cyclones in 2020
- 2020 Central Vietnam floods
- Typhoon Cimaron (2006) – an intense typhoon that caused severe damage after traversing Luzon.
- Typhoon Nesat (2011) – a destructive typhoon that caused widespread impacts in Luzon.
- Typhoon Molave – another powerful typhoon that affected similar areas less than a week after.
- Typhoon Utor – a very strong and deadly typhoon that also affected Central Luzon.
- Typhoon Noru – a destructive typhoon that caused widespread agricultural damages, also affected similar areas.
- Typhoon Saudel (2026)
