= Typhoon Dolphin (2026) =

Pacific typhoon in 2026

- Dolphin at its peak intensity on July 29

Meteorological history
- Formed: July 26, 2026
- Dissipated: August 12, 2026

Violent typhoon
- 10-minute sustained (JMA)
- Highest winds: 205 km/h (125 mph)
- Lowest pressure: 915 hPa (mbar); 27.02 inHg

Category 5-equivalent super typhoon
- 1-minute sustained (SSHWS/JTWC)
- Highest winds: 280 km/h (175 mph)
- Lowest pressure: 909 hPa (mbar); 26.84 inHg

Overall effects
- Fatalities: 6 indirect
- Injuries: 14 (7 direct, 7 indirect)
- Damage: >$4.12 billion (2026 USD)
- Areas affected: Marshall Islands, Japan (particularly Minamitorishima, Bonin Islands, Daitō Islands, Ryukyu Islands, Kyushu), Taiwan, East China, Philippines
- Part of the 2026 Pacific typhoon season

Typhoon Dolphin (Note: The name Dolphin (Cantonese: 白海豚, [pak hɔi tʰyn]) was contributed by Hong Kong and refers to the Chinese white dolphin.) was a powerful, large, very long-lived and costly tropical cyclone that affected East China in early August 2026. The thirteenth named storm, fifth typhoon and third violent typhoon of the 2026 Pacific typhoon season, Dolphin originated from a disturbance near the International Date Line in the Central Pacific in mid-July. Initially monitored by the Central Pacific Hurricane Center (CPHC), it crossed the International Date Line a week later, with the Japan Meteorological Agency (JMA) recognizing it as a tropical depression during the late hours of July 26. The United States' Joint Typhoon Warning Center (JTWC) followed suit the following day, designating it as 12W; a few hours later, both agencies upgraded it to a tropical storm, with the former giving it the name Dolphin.

== Meteorological history ==
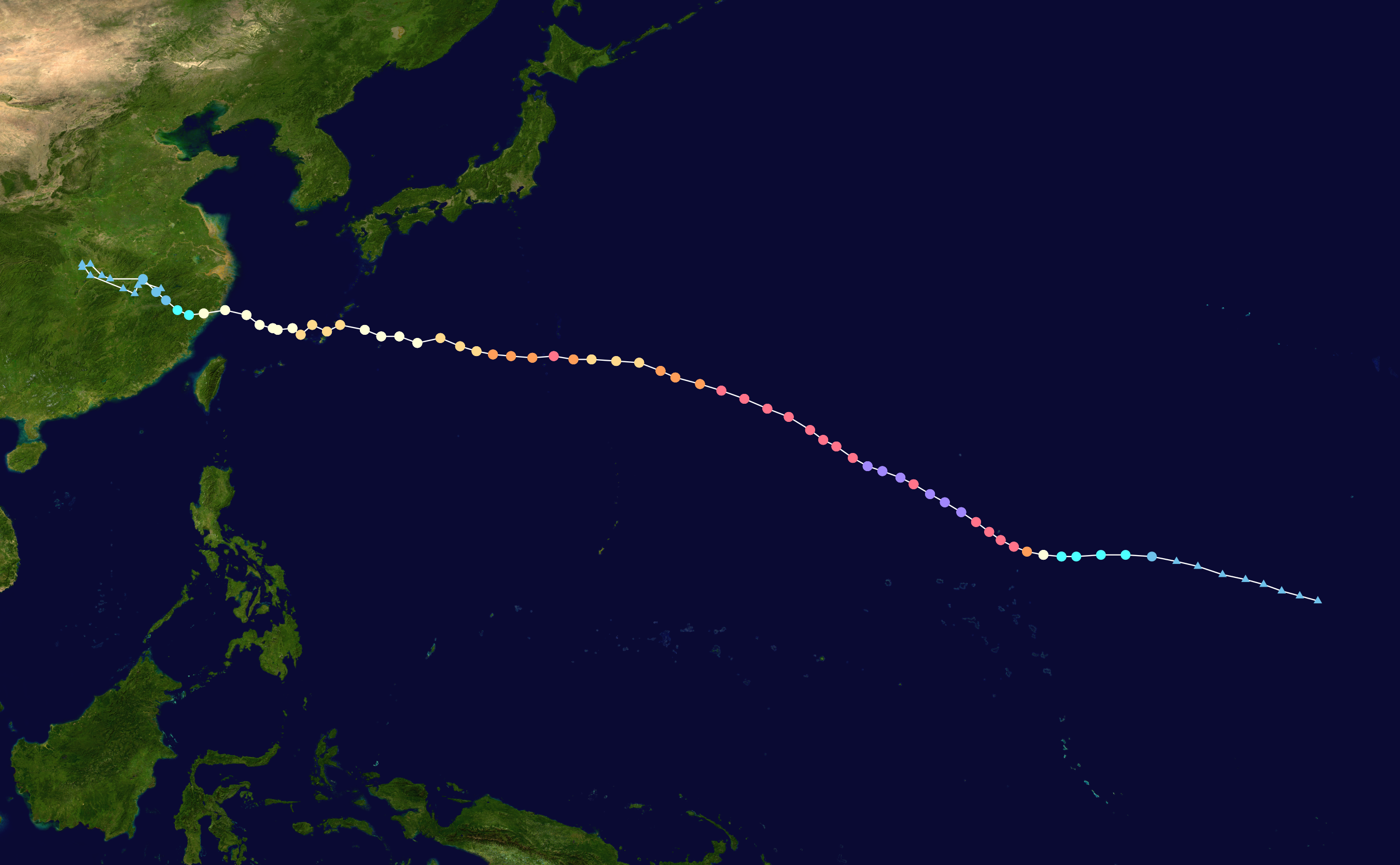
Map plotting the storm's track and intensity, according to the Saffir–Simpson scale Map key Saffir–Simpson scale Tropical depression (≤38 mph, ≤62 km/h) Tropical storm (39–73 mph, 63–118 km/h) Category 1 (74–95 mph, 119–153 km/h) Category 2 (96–110 mph, 154–177 km/h) Category 3 (111–129 mph, 178–208 km/h) Category 4 (130–156 mph, 209–251 km/h) Category 5 (≥157 mph, ≥252 km/h) Unknown Storm type Tropical cyclone Subtropical cyclone Extratropical cyclone, remnant low, tropical disturbance, or monsoon depression

Dolphin moving in a trochoidal pattern on August 8

On July 19, the Central Pacific Hurricane Center began monitoring a disturbance south of the Hawaiian Islands. When the disturbance had a high 90% chance of development in the next two days, it was designated Invest 92C.

Later on July 26, the disturbance crossed into the Western Pacific, and the JMA classified the system as a tropical depression upon crossover. The following day at midnight, The JTWC upgraded the disturbance to a tropical depression, designating it as 12W, upgraded by the JMA to a tropical storm shortly after, and received its current name Dolphin. Almost immediately after its nomenclature, Dolphin began a period of rapid intensification, to an extent not seen since Typhoon Noru, quickly becoming a typhoon and reaching a Category 4-equivalent initial peak intensity on the Saffir–Simpson scale on July 28, before its intensification was stunted by an eyewall replacement cycle. After finishing, Dolphin resumed intensifying once again, reaching super typhoon status the following day. Soon after reaching Category 5 strength on the Saffir–Simpson scale, Dolphin started undergoing a second eyewall replacement cycle, temporarily halting further development of the storm. Dolphin continued moving westward which it started slowly weakening to a Category 2 equivalent typhoon after 3 days. Next, Dolphin regained intensity as Category 3 typhoon. On August 5, Dolphin started weakening again shortly to a Category-1 equivalent typhoon with 1-minute sustained winds of 90mph. After that, Dolphin passed the Ryukyu Islands and made a direct landfall over Kume Island. Dolphin soon made landfall over Yuhuan in China's Zhejiang province at 17:30 CST on August 9, followed by a second landfall over Wenzhou an hour later.

== Preparations ==
=== Japan ===
Satellite loop of Typhoon Dolphin approaching Okinawa on August 6.

The Japan Meteorological Agency (JMA) warned of strong winds, heavy rainfall, landslides, and flooding due to the effects of Dolphin. Heavy rainfall warnings were issued for the Daitō Islands as the typhoon closely approached. Level 4 heavy rainfall warnings were also issued for Ogimi, Higashi, and Nakijin. Level 4 landslide warnings were issued for the same areas as well as Kunigami and Motobu. A Level 4 storm surge warning was posted for Kumejima, as well.

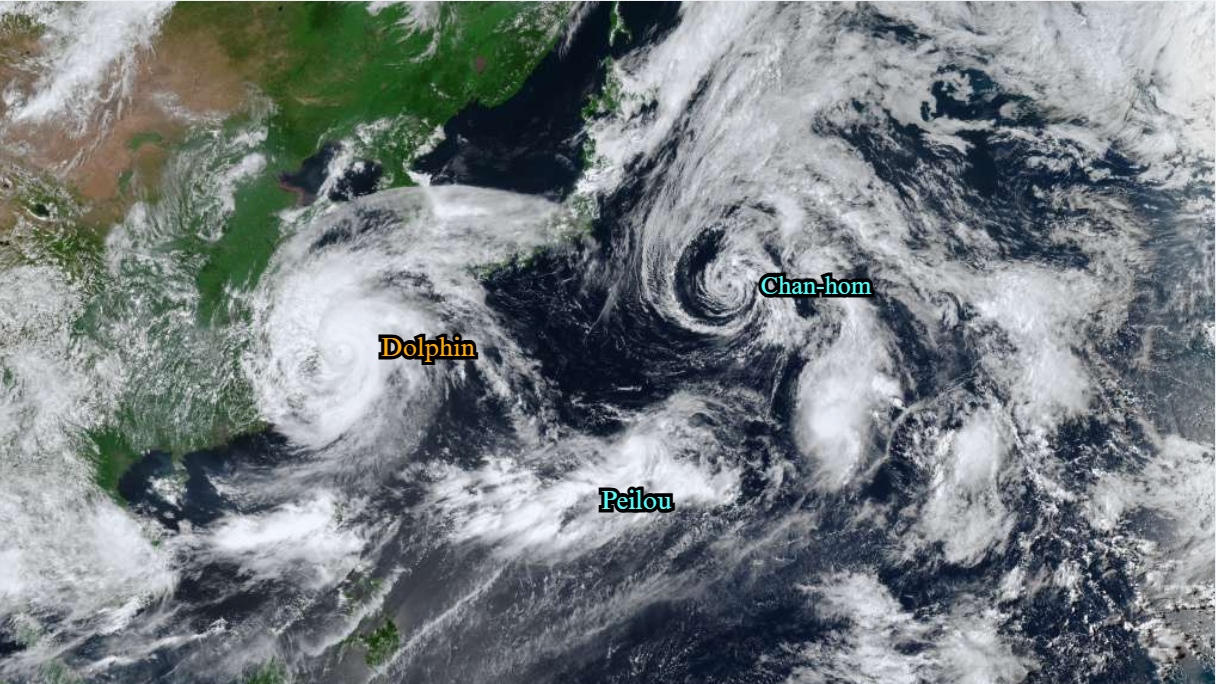
Three storms active on August 9 as labeled Typhoon Dolphin (Left), Tropical Storm Peilou (Middle), and Tropical Storm Chan-hom (Top) Circulation to the south and to the East of Chan-hom later become TD 15W

More than 260,000 people in Kagoshima and Okinawa prefectures were advised to evacuate. The typhoon was expected to affect parts of Kumamoto Prefecture impacted by a magnitude 7.1 earthquake the previous week. More than 6,700 residents remained in shelters at the time of Dolphin's arrival. Residents in Kumamoto Prefecture covered roofs damaged by the earthquake in plastic sheets. More than 500 flights were cancelled due to the storm, with Naha Airport cancelling all its flights on August 7. Toyota ceased operations at nine factories across Japan over concerns about shipping disruptions. All bus companies on the island of Okinawa suspended operations as the typhoon approached. The Okinawa Urban Monorail also suspended operations for the duration of the typhoon. The city government of Naha opened seven temporary storm shelters. About 240 people evacuated to storm shelters prior to the storm across Okinawa Prefecture.

=== China ===
China Meteorological Administration (CMA) issued a yellow typhoon warning for part of the country's east coast as Dolphin approached, and updated it to red on the noon of August 9. Gale-force winds were expected to impact the waters of the East China Sea and the Bashi Channel, as well as coastal areas of Zhejiang and Fujian. More than 1 million people were evacuated across eastern China in preparation for the storm.

The provincial government of Zhejiang prepared 15 tow boats for emergencies. A total of 162 ferry routes and 193 water construction projects were halted for the duration of the typhoon. A total of 474 ships were also docked for the storm. Seaside tourists and sports activities in Ningbo were cancelled. The government of Fujian Province declared a Level 4 emergency response which advised all communities to dock fishing vessels and ferries and to secure offshore wind power platforms. Safety inspections, evacuations of high-risk zones, and the gathering of emergency resources were also required through the order. Major delays occurred as ports in China closed in preparation for Dolphin. Container operations were suspended at the Port of Shanghai. Temporary port suspensions were also expected to take place in Ningbo. China's insurance industry had received nearly 130,000 claims related to Typhoon Dolphin as of August 12, with estimated losses of 1.75 billion yuan ($259.5 million).

The government of China used the arrival of Dolphin to test new technology for typhoons. This included the use of artificial intelligence in forecasting systems at the National Marine Environmental Forecasting Centre which were used to give long-range forecasts for the storm. Drones were also deployed to aid in preparations in coastal provinces.

=== Philippines ===
Despite the system remaining outside the Philippine Area of Responsibility (PAR), rainfall warnings were put in place as the system enhanced the southwest monsoon. Heavy rainfall warnings were put in place over Bataan, Occidental Mindoro, and Zambales, while multiple provinces plus Metro Manila were put under an orange warning.

== Impact ==
=== Japan ===
In Japan, Dolphin reached maximum wind speeds of 162 km/h (101 mph), with Okinawa and Amami Islands among the most affected regions; Naha Airport of Okinawa suspended all flights on August 7. Dolphin created havoc in parts of southern Japan, paralyzing traffic and sending hundreds to take shelter. Preliminary damage caused by the storm was assessed at JP¥800 million (US$5.02 million).

=== Taiwan ===
Taiwan was hit with heavy rainstorms on August 7-8, with citizens of Taipei reporting "toppled trees, downed scaffolding and collapsed construction fencing", and Tamsui District reporting blown-off roofs. One the morning of August 9, Taiwan suspended all ferry routes and issued about 200 flight cancellations; its Central Weather Administration reported a maximum sustained wind speed of 119 km/h (74 mph) on 11 a.m., stating it to be about 350 kilometers north-northeast of Taipei and moving west.

=== China ===
In Shanghai, the Shanghai Ferry suspended all services on August 8, and all coastal tourist destinations in Fengxian District and a number of parks were temporarily closed. More than 1,300 flights were cancelled on August 9, and around 300,000 people in surrounding regions were evacuated in preparation. Shanghai Disney and Disneytown also closed beginning that night. Numerous metro lines either completely or partially stopped operation, with more closing down on August 10. Flooding occurred in the French Concession.

In Beijing, intense rain from the storm flooded key roads and stranded vehicles.

In Zhejiang, Ningbo Lishe International Airport suspended all flights. A nine-year-old boy in Wenling was reported missing after he was swept into the sea. Two people were detained on suspicion of spreading misinformation related to the storm. Total economic damage in China from Dolphin and other subsequent storms added up to 28.26 billion yuan (US$4.21 billion).

=== Philippines ===
More than 500 passengers were stranded across 28 ports due to rough conditions brought on by the southwest monsoon that was intensified by Dolphin. Torrential rains caused waist-deep flooding in low-lying communities and areas near creeks in Quezon City. Several other neighborhoods in Manila and western Philippines also experienced flooding. Malacañang Palace announced sweeping suspensions on classes and work in government offices in Metro Manila and 15 other provinces due to continuing heavy rains by the typhoon's enhancement of the southwest monsoon.

=== Hong Kong ===
Hong Kong recorded its hottest ever temperature of 36.9 °C (98.4 °F) because of subsiding hot air from outside the typhoon, breaking the previous record set on 22 August 2017, before Typhoon Hato hit. A weather station in Sheung Shui recorded 39.8 °C (103.6 °F), the highest ever temperature recorded in Hong Kong since automatic weather stations were introduced in 1984.

== See also ==
- Weather of 2026
- Tropical cyclones in 2026
- Others storms of the same name
- List of super typhoons
- List of violent typhoons
- Typhoon Bavi (2026) – another very large Category 5 super typhoon that made landfall in nearly the same place in China almost a month earlier
