= List of storms named Haishen =

The name Haishen (Mandarin: 海神, [xaɪ˧˩˧ ʂən˧˥]) has been used for five tropical cyclones in the western North Pacific Ocean. The name was contributed by China and literally means "god of sea" in Mandarin.

- Typhoon Haishen (2002) (T0225, 30W) – a Category 2 typhoon that did not affect land
- Tropical Storm Haishen (2008) (T0820, 25W) – a short lived tropical storm that formed off the Coast of Japan
- Tropical Storm Haishen (2015) (T1505, 05W) – weak storm that churned in the open sea
- Typhoon Haishen (2020) (T2010, 11W, Kristine) – a Category 4 super typhoon that traversed Ryukyu Islands and the Korean Peninsula
- Tropical Storm Haishen (2026) (T2611, Josie) – short-lived storm; not recognized by the JTWC

| Preceded by Maysak | Pacific typhoon season names Haishen | Succeeded by Noul |
