= Typhoon Utor =

Pacific typhoon in 2013

Typhoon Utor (Labuyo)
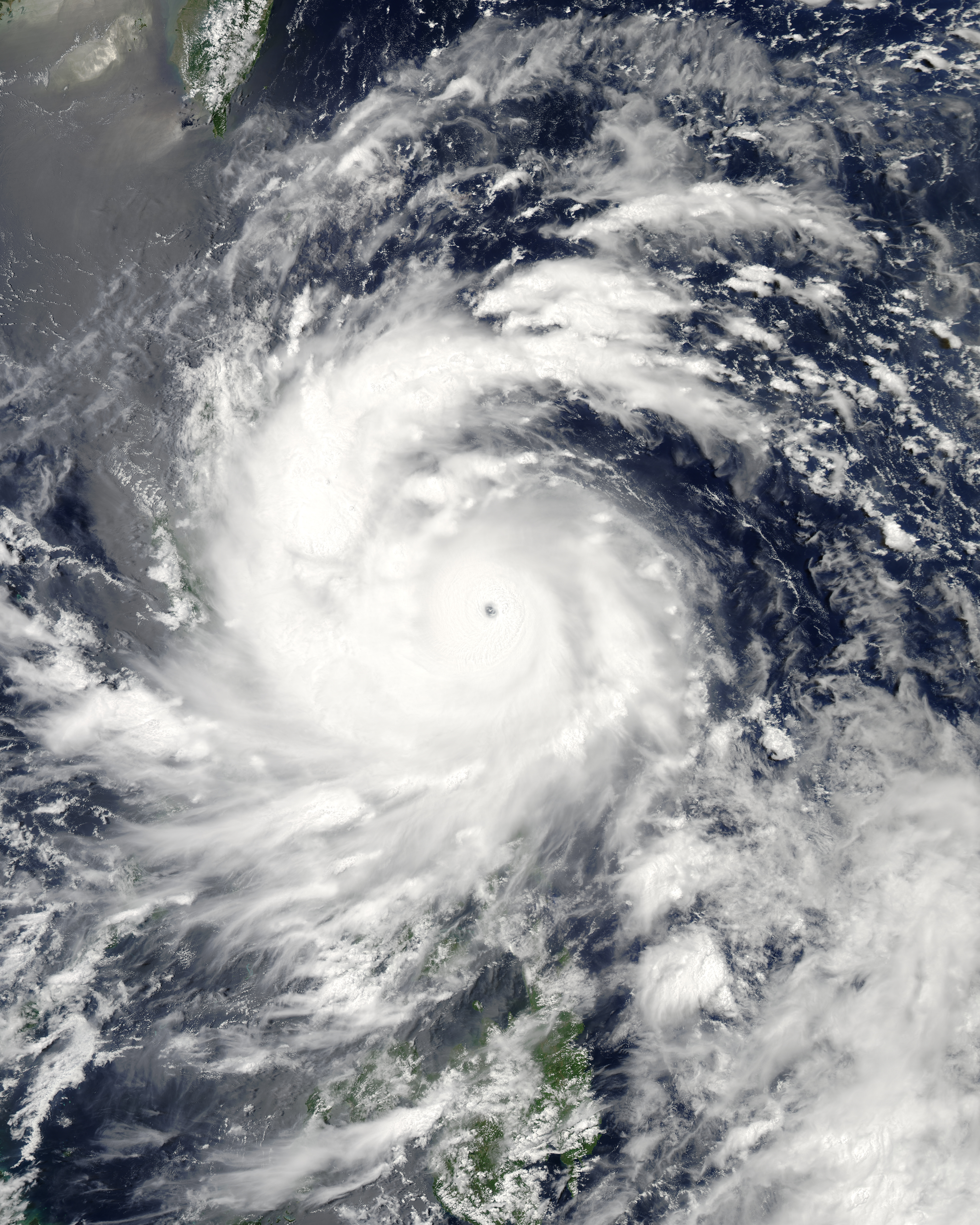
- Utor rapidly intensifying off the Philippines on August 11

Meteorological history
- Formed: August 8, 2013
- Dissipated: August 18, 2013

Violent typhoon
- 10-minute sustained (JMA)
- Highest winds: 195 km/h (120 mph)
- Lowest pressure: 925 hPa (mbar); 27.32 inHg

Category 4-equivalent super typhoon
- 1-minute sustained (SSHWS/JTWC)
- Highest winds: 240 km/h (150 mph)
- Lowest pressure: 926 hPa (mbar); 27.34 inHg

Overall effects
- Fatalities: 97
- Damage: $3.55 billion (2013 USD)
- Areas affected: Philippines, Hong Kong, Macao, Guangdong, Guangxi, Jiangxi, Hunan
- IBTrACS
- Part of the 2013 Pacific typhoon season

Typhoon Utor, (Note: The name Utor (Marshallese: uto̧r, [wudˠɒrʷ]) was contributed by the United States and means squall line in Marshallese.) known in the Philippines as Typhoon Labuyo, was a powerful, deadly and destructive tropical cyclone that struck the Philippines and southern China in mid August 2013. Utor was the 15th depression, the 2nd typhoon, and the first super typhoon in the 2013 Pacific typhoon season. Utor started originating near Yap, tracking westwards in a favorable development, allowing the system to be better organized. All agencies upgraded the system as a depression soon after, with JTWC designating it as Tropical Depression 11W and PAGASA naming the depression as Labuyo. Continuing westwards, JMA named 11W as Utor as it continued to consolidate.

Developing into a tropical storm on August 9, Utor soon underwent explosive intensification and became a Category 4 super typhoon within a half day. After making landfall over Casiguran, Aurora in Luzon late on August 11. Utor lost its pin-hole eye after having its land interaction. The typhoon re-emerged in the South China Sea, and it ultimately made its second landfall over Yangxi County in China on August 14. Utor downgraded into a depression on the next day as it moved slowly over Guangxi. The remnant low later dissipated on August 18.

== Meteorological history ==
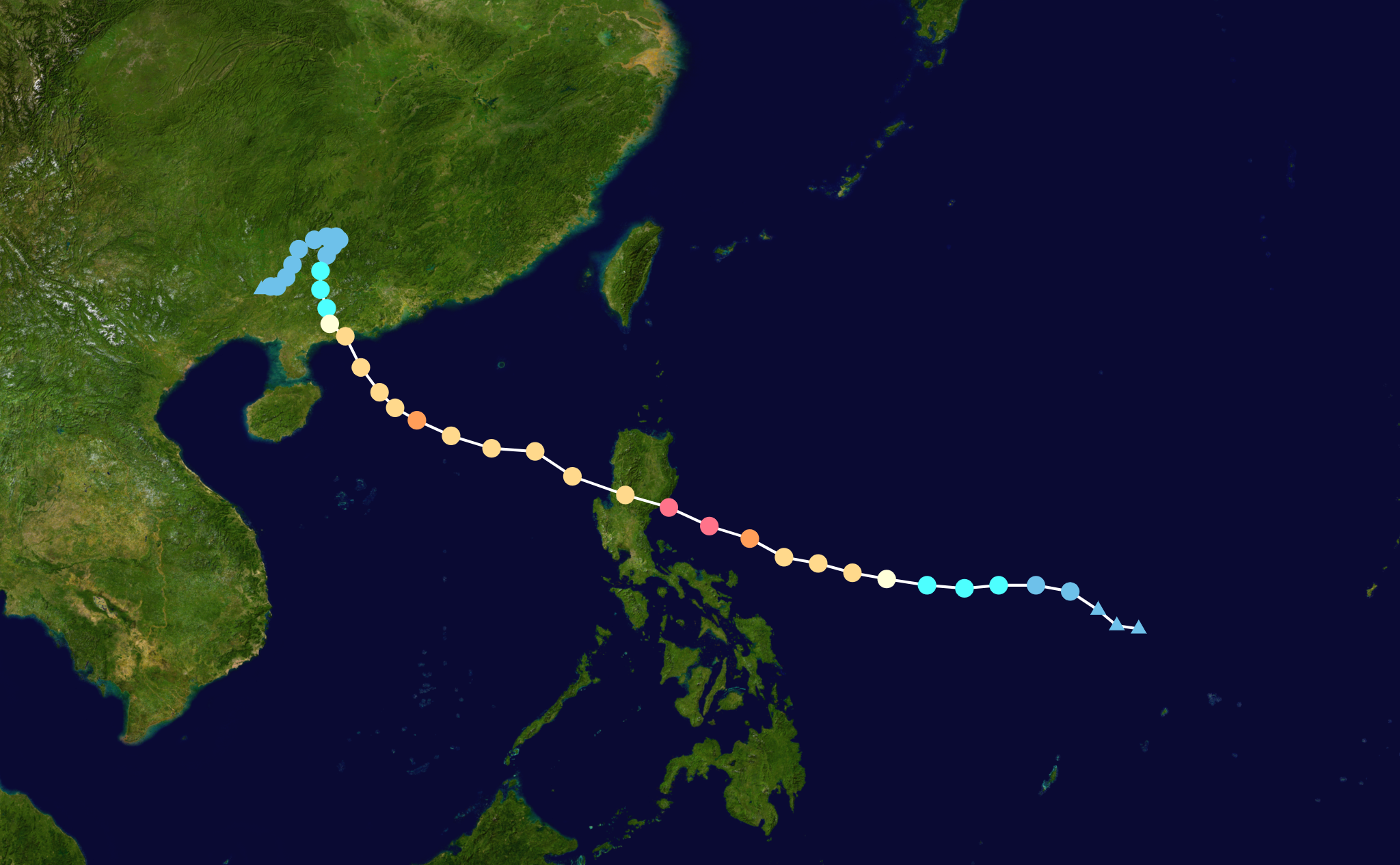
Map plotting the storm's track and intensity, according to the Saffir–Simpson scale Map key Saffir–Simpson scale Tropical depression (≤38 mph, ≤62 km/h) Tropical storm (39–73 mph, 63–118 km/h) Category 1 (74–95 mph, 119–153 km/h) Category 2 (96–110 mph, 154–177 km/h) Category 3 (111–129 mph, 178–208 km/h) Category 4 (130–156 mph, 209–251 km/h) Category 5 (≥157 mph, ≥252 km/h) Unknown Storm type Tropical cyclone Subtropical cyclone Extratropical cyclone, remnant low, tropical disturbance, or monsoon depression

Early on August 8, the Joint Typhoon Warning Center (JTWC) reported that a tropical disturbance had developed north of Yap. During that day, the system moved westwards and consolidated within a favourable environment of weak vertical wind shear and strong outflow, which was enhanced by a TUTT Cell located to the northwest of the disturbance. As a result, the Japan Meteorological Agency (JMA), JTWC and PAGASA upgraded the system to a tropical depression 11W north of Palau, with the latter naming it Labuyo as it approached the Philippine Area of Responsibility. During the next day, JTWC and JMA upgraded the system to a tropical storm, with the latter naming it as Utor (1311). Shortly thereafter, Utor began undergoing explosive intensification, achieving typhoon status early on August 10, as an eye developed.

On August 11, under the influence of low vertical wind shear, very favourable poleward and westward outflow, and warm sea surface temperature, Utor began to intensify more and formed a clear eye. At 12:00 UTC, Typhoon Utor attained peak intensity by the ten-minute maximum sustained winds reaching 105 knots (195 km/h, 120 mph) and the atmospheric pressure decreasing to 925 hPa (27.3 inHg). The system became exceptionally symmetrical, as the convective bands had further deepened and wrapped tighter around a 13 nautical miles (24 km; 15 mi) pin-hole eye, prompting JTWC upgrading Utor to a super typhoon. Due to land interaction with Luzon, the pin-hole eye filled in quickly; as a result, JTWC downgraded Utor to a typhoon at 18:00 UTC. Tracking along the southern periphery of a subtropical ridge to the north, Utor made landfall over northern Luzon around 19:00 UTC (03:00 PHT on August 12).

Owing to peaks of western Luzon, Utor significantly weakened as the deep convection became disorganised. Early on August 12, Utor arrived at the South China Sea, where the environment southwest of an anticyclone was favourable with diffluence aloft, light vertical wind shear and excellent radial outflow. Although a ragged eye had formed later that day, the typhoon did not restrengthen further when tracking along the southern periphery of a subtropical ridge. On August 13, the eye of Utor had become well-defined on the visible satellite imagery, but the intensity and structure remained when the system was tracking northwestward. At 07:50 UTC (15:50 CST) on August 14, Utor made landfall over Yangxi County in Yangjiang, Guangdong, China as a minimal typhoon. At 12:00 UTC, JMA downgraded Utor to a severe tropical storm, shortly before JTWC issued a final warning to the rapidly weakening system due to land interaction. Later, Utor weakened into a tropical storm overland, and JMA downgraded the system into a tropical depression at noon on August 15. However, the remnants began tracking very slowly in Guangxi, until the tropical depression finally dissipated on August 18.

== Preparations and impact ==
=== Philippines ===
Animated enhanced infrared satellite loop of Typhoon Utor from peak intensity to landfall in the Philippines

Ahead of Utor affecting the Philippines, PAGASA issued various tropical cyclone signals for Luzon and Visayas, including signal 3 for the provinces of Aurora and Isabela and signal 1 for Metro Manila. As Utor approached Central Luzon, a Malacanang Palace spokesperson called that local government to prepare and evacuate residents living near slopes, mountains and sea. Thirty-two provinces in Luzon and Manila had been placed under signal warnings. In Isabela, 67 families were evacuated before landfall. Under the anticipation of a direct hit, the local Pangasinan government placed the entire province on red alert. On August 11, the governor announced the suspension of classes from pre-school to tertiary level. Government and private offices were also suspended. Rescue equipment and rubber boats had also been placed in the disaster risk area of the province. In the said regions, the government advised all to not engage in water sports or rough seas due to the anticipated rough seas.

Utor made its landfall in Casiguran, Aurora at 3 AM (local time) on August 12. Power lines and telecommunications went down and many houses were destroyed. In Nueva Vizcaya, heavy rainfall had been recorded. Some residents in the said province were forced to evacuate due to flooding. Moreover, the Magat River in the province reached the critical level, resulting in the partial opening of four gates in a dam. Electricity was also out in the province. One man died in Baguio after he had been buried alive after a mudslide hit his home. In Isabela, more than 100 families had been affected by Utor. About 200 million pesos in agriculture was blamed on Utor in Isabela alone. Around 1,000 residents in the central Bicol region spent the night in shelters, and 23 fishermen who were out at sea failed to return home in four towns in Catanduanes province. Some cars in North Luzon Expressway used hazard signals as roads were nearly impossible to see. Intense rainfall throughout the day had been recorded in Zambales, which created flash flooding in low-lying areas. The major river in the province then overflowed, flooding homes. The flooding was expected to rise as high tide was expected in the morning. At least 700 passengers were stranded in the ports of Albay, Catanduanes, Sorsogon and Samar. Additionally, 10 flights had also been canceled as Utor brought intense rainfall in many parts of Luzon.

Throughout the Philippines, 11 people were killed while four others were listed as missing. A total of 407,493 people were affected by the typhoon, roughly a third of whom were displaced from their homes. Significant infrastructural damage took place with 2,592 homes destroyed and 21,197 more damaged. Losses from Utor amounted to ₱1.58 billion (US$36.4 million), the majority resulting from agricultural damage.

=== China ===
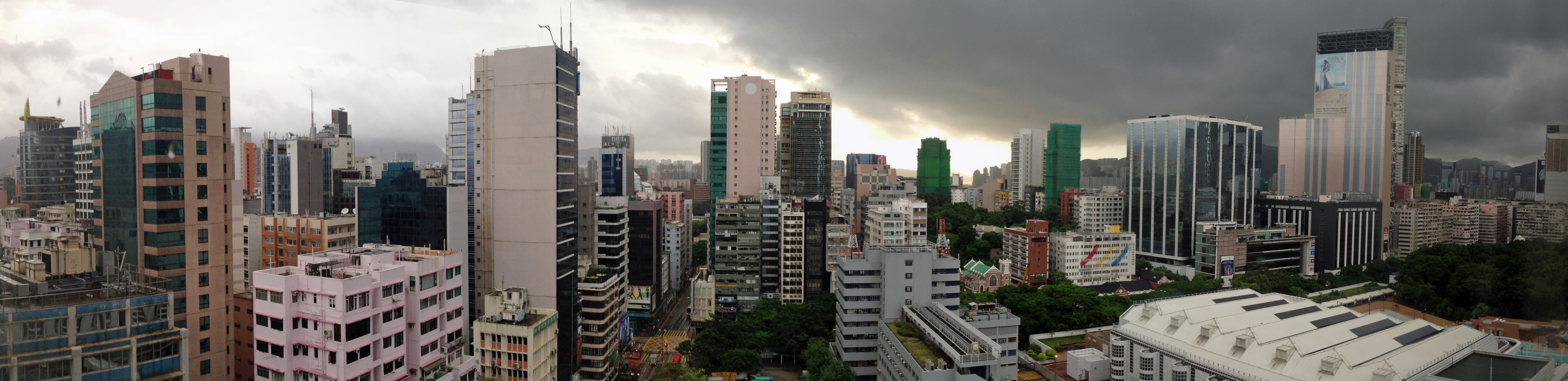
Typhoon Utor over Hong Kong on 14 August

The Chinese bulk carrier Trans Summer sank some 45 nautical miles (83 km; 52 mi) southwest of Hong Kong after having been caught in the typhoon. Twenty-one members of the crew were saved.

Widespread damage took place in Guangdong Province where at least four people were killed and four others were listed missing. An estimated 1.09 million people were affected, 161,500 of whom were temporarily relocated due to the threat of flooding. Typhoon-force winds caused a belt factory in Dongguan to collapse, killing 1 person and injuring 17 others. Losses across the province amounted to ¥8.63 billion (US$1.41 billion). 18 people were killed in Guangxi Province while more than 1.3 million people were affected. Losses in the province reached ¥698 million (US$114 million). Prolonged heavy rains in Hunan Province triggered widespread flooding that caused substantial damage. At least five people were killed and five others were listed missing while 964,600 people were affected by the storm.

Following the storm, prices of vegetables were raised by an average of one percent in Guangzhou, while the price of leafy vegetables was raised by as much as 15 percent. A total of 86 people were killed in Mainland China, while total damages were amounted to be ¥21.5 billion (US$3.51 billion).

== Retirement ==
During their 2014 annual session, the ESCAP/WMO Typhoon Committee announced that the name Utor would be retired from the naming lists. The name Barijat was chosen to replace Utor, and was used for the first time in the 2018 season.

PAGASA announced that the name Labuyo, would be retired from its naming lists after it had caused over PHP1 billion in damages. PAGASA chose the name Lannie to replace Labuyo for the 2017 season.

== See also ==
- Typhoon Megi (2010)
- Typhoon Imbudo - A strong typhoon that took a similar track and affected the same region.
- Typhoon Cimaron (2006)
- Typhoon Elsie (1989)
- Typhoon Kalmaegi (2014)
- Typhoon Sally (1996)
- Typhoon Koryn (1993)
- Typhoon Nesat (2011)
- Typhoon Nalgae (2011)
- Typhoon Koppu
- Typhoon Melor
- Typhoon Saudel (2020)
- Typhoon Noru (2022)
- Tropical Storm Talim (2023)
- Typhoon Man-yi (2024)
- Typhoon Fung-wong (2025)
- Typhoon Mangkhut (2018) - A stronger storm that hit the island of Luzon but similar track to Utor.
