= Nascent state (disambiguation) =

Nascent state is a psychological process of destructuration-reorganization.

Nascent state may also refer to:

- Nascent state (chemistry), a superseded chemical theory
- In statu nascendi, a Latin phrase
