= List of storms named Maysak =

The name Maysak (Khmer: ម៉ៃសាក់, [maj.ˈsaʔ]) has been used for five tropical cyclones in the western North Pacific Ocean. The name was contributed by Cambodia and means a teak (Tectona grandis) in Khmer.

- Severe Tropical Storm Maysak (2002) (T0223, 29W) – formed far away from landmass.
- Severe Tropical Storm Maysak (2008) (T0819, 24W, Quinta-Siony) – a moderate tropical storm which formed in the South China Sea.
- Typhoon Maysak (2015) (T1504, 04W, Chedeng) – an unusually intense typhoon during the early part of 2015.
- Typhoon Maysak (2020) (T2009, 10W, Julian) – a powerful category 4 typhoon that passed through the Ryukyu Islands and the Korean Peninsula.
- Severe Tropical Storm Maysak (2026) (T2610, 10W, Henry) – a deadly storm that made landfall on Hainan and Vietnam.

Preceded by Bavi	Pacific typhoon season names Maysak	Succeeded by Haishen
