= Water cabbage =

Water cabbage is a common name for several plants and may refer to:

- Pistia, a monotypic plant genus in the family Araceae
- Samolus valerandi, a species of water pimpernel
