= Typhoon Noru =

Pacific typhoon in 2022

Typhoon Noru (Karding)
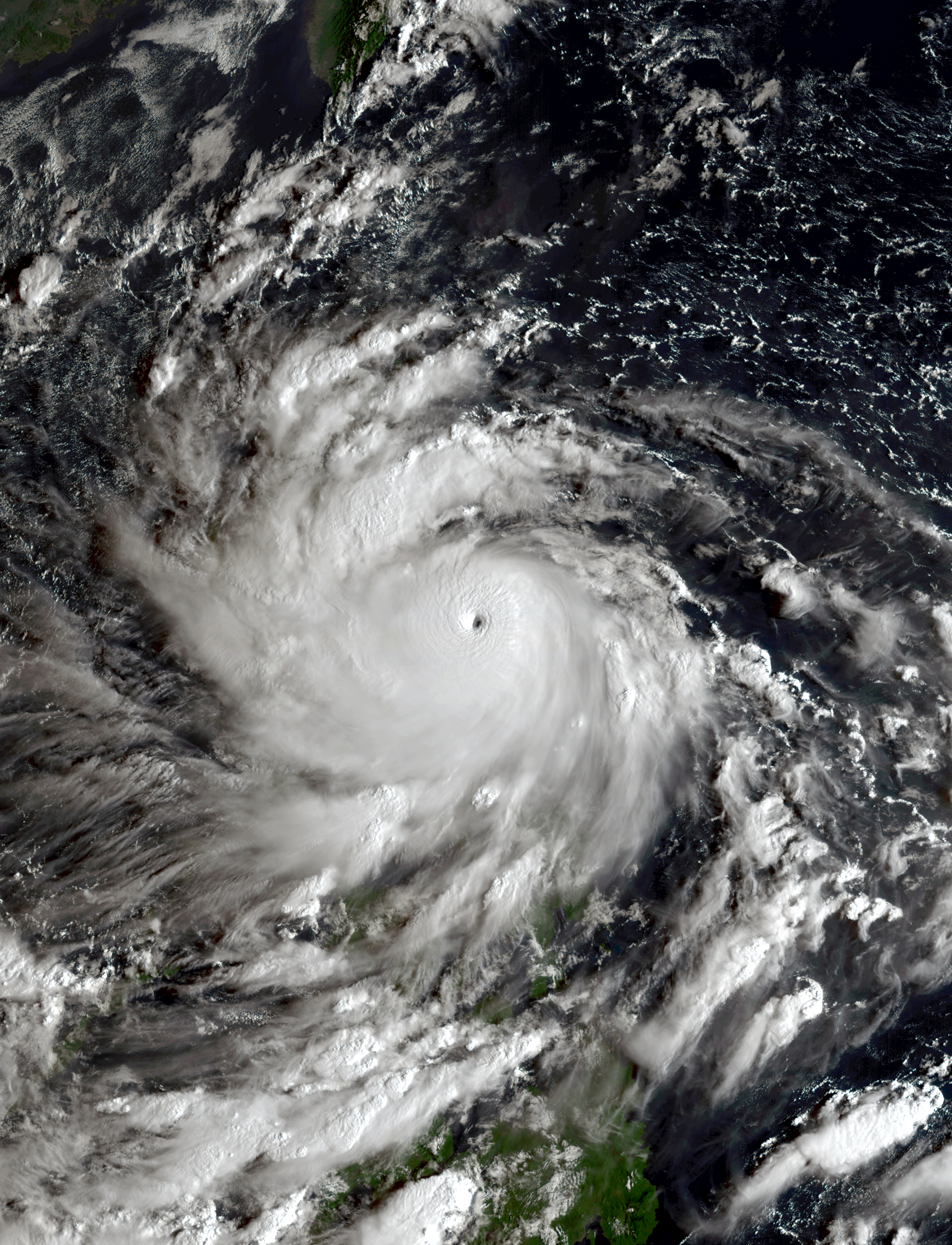
- Noru east of the Philippines at peak intensity in the morning of September 25

Meteorological history
- Formed: September 21, 2022
- Dissipated: September 29, 2022

Very strong typhoon
- 10-minute sustained (JMA)
- Highest winds: 175 km/h (110 mph)
- Lowest pressure: 940 hPa (mbar); 27.76 inHg

Category 5-equivalent super typhoon
- 1-minute sustained (SSHWS/JTWC)
- Highest winds: 270 km/h (165 mph)
- Lowest pressure: 914 hPa (mbar); 26.99 inHg

Overall effects
- Fatalities: 40
- Missing: 5
- Damage: $313 million (2022 USD)
- Areas affected: Philippines; Vietnam; Laos; Thailand; Cambodia
- IBTrACS
- Part of the 2022 Pacific typhoon season

Typhoon Noru, (Note: The name Noru (Korean: 노루, [no̞ɾu]) was contributed by South Korea and refers to the Siberian roe deer (Capreolus pygargus) in Korean.) known in the Philippines as Super Typhoon Karding, was a powerful and destructive tropical cyclone that affected Indochina and the Philippines in late September 2022 — where it caused widespread agricultural damage. Noru was the sixteenth named storm and eighth typhoon, and third super typhoon of the 2022 Pacific typhoon season, Noru originated from a disturbance over the Philippine Sea, slowly tracking eastward until its development into a tropical depression, where it began to move westward.

Noru underwent rapid intensification as it approached Luzon, with 10-minute maximum sustained winds intensifying by 85 km/h (50 mph) in the span of 24 hours. Right before its first landfall, Noru reached its peak intensity with maximum sustained winds of up to 175 km/h (110 mph) and as a PAGASA super typhoon. Noru made its first landfall over the Polillo Islands on September 25 at 17:30 PHT (09:30 UTC) as a Category 4. It then made its second landfall over Dingalan, Aurora five hours later as a high-end typhoon. It significantly weakened while crossing Luzon and emerged into the South China Sea nine hours later. Noru continued to re-intensify over the South China Sea, reaching winds of up to 155 km/h (100 mph) before making its third and final landfall in Da Nang, Vietnam. Tracking further westward, Noru brought heavy winds and rains to Thailand as a tropical depression and later dissipated on September 29.

Noru was the strongest typhoon to hit the Philippines in that year. The National Disaster Risk Reduction and Management Council (NDRRMC) of the Philippines reported at least ₱304 million (US$6.18 million) in infrastructural damages and ₱3.08 billion (US$62.5 million) in agricultural damages, totalling to ₱3.38 billion (US$68.7 million). 40 people were killed following the typhoon, another 5 were reported missing. Due to the damages and deaths it caused, the names Noru and Karding were retired after the season. They were respectively replaced by Hodu and Kiyapo.

== Meteorological history ==
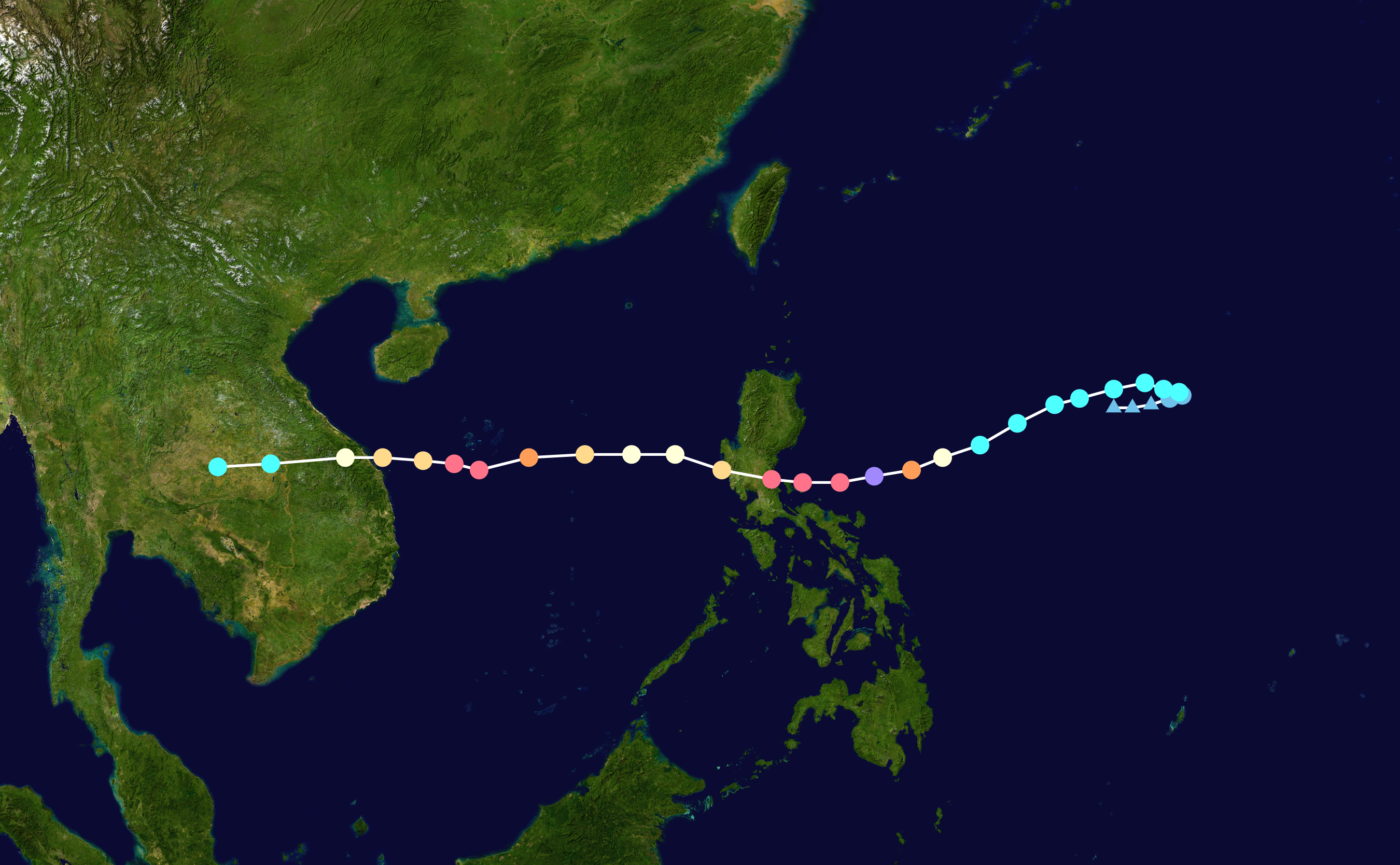
Map plotting the storm's track and intensity, according to the Saffir–Simpson scale Map key Saffir–Simpson scale Tropical depression (≤38 mph, ≤62 km/h) Tropical storm (39–73 mph, 63–118 km/h) Category 1 (74–95 mph, 119–153 km/h) Category 2 (96–110 mph, 154–177 km/h) Category 3 (111–129 mph, 178–208 km/h) Category 4 (130–156 mph, 209–251 km/h) Category 5 (≥157 mph, ≥252 km/h) Unknown Storm type Tropical cyclone Subtropical cyclone Extratropical cyclone, remnant low, tropical disturbance, or monsoon depression

On September 21 at 00:00 UTC, the Japan Meteorological Agency (JMA) began tracking a tropical depression at 22°N 141°E, far east of the Philippine Sea. The Joint Typhoon Warning Center (JTWC) also began tracking the disturbance later on as the system slowly moved eastwards, deeper into the Pacific Ocean. Analysis from the JTWC indicated that the system was in a favorable environment for development, with warm sea surface temperatures, low vertical wind shear, and medium radial outflow. The agency began issuing a Tropical Cyclone Formation Alert for the disturbance shortly after. The system slowly consolidated as it moved eastward and was designated as Tropical Depression 18W by JTWC on September 22.

Around the same time, the Philippine Atmospheric, Geophysical, and Astronomical Services Administration (PAGASA) noted the system's formation into a tropical depression. As a system formed within the Philippine Area of Responsibility (PAR), it was immediately given the local name Karding, and the agency began releasing bulletins on the storm. Shortly after, the JMA also recognized the system as a tropical depression. After a lack of steering flow stalled the depression, it began tracking westward along a mid-level subtropical high, maintaining its intensity as it failed to consolidate further despite its favorable environment. Despite this, the JTWC and the PAGASA would upgrade the depression to a tropical storm at 09:00 UTC. The JMA would later upgrade the depression to a storm a day later, on September 23, and was subsequently named Noru. Up until this point, forecasts from all three agencies expected wind speeds of only up to 55 knots (100 km/h; 65 mph); the JTWC further cited a weak upper-level outflow and dry air as hindrances to rapid intensification.

Typhoon Noru undergoing a period of rapid intensification while approaching Luzon on September 24

On September 24, the JMA assessed the storm's development into a severe tropical storm. The PAGASA also upgraded the storm shortly after. Satellite imagery now showed a deep convective core with a central dense overcast and cloud tops reaching −82 °C (−116 °F), with animated infrared imagery showing bursts of convection along the circulation center. The environment around the storm were now very favorable for further development. Intensifying 20 knots (35 km/h; 25 mph) in the course of 12 hours, the JMA and the PAGASA upgraded the storm into a typhoon by 12:00 UTC; the JTWC following shortly after as Noru's eye began to form. Under very favorable conditions for development, Noru continued its trend of rapid intensification, reaching its peak intensity of 95 knots (175 km/h; 110 mph) 10-minute maximum sustained winds with a minimum central barometric pressure at 940 hectopascals (940 mbar; 28 inHg) by 00:00 UTC on September 25, a mere 230 kilometres (140 mi) east of Infanta, Quezon. Given its intensity, the PAGASA upgraded the system to its classification of super typhoon; the JTWC had also done the same three hours prior. At 17:30 PHT (09:30 UTC), the typhoon made its first landfall over the Polillo Islands in the municipality of Burdeos, Quezon. Following interaction with land over the Polillo Islands, the PAGASA downgraded the system to a high-end typhoon, just prior to its second landfall over Dingalan, Aurora at 20:20 PHT (12:20 UTC).

Now tracking westward over Central Luzon, Noru weakened further as it interacted with land and the rugged terrain of the Sierra Madre mountain range; the eye of the system later disappeared from multispectral satellite imaging. Noru emerged over the coastal waters of Zambales at 05:00 PHT, September 26 (21:00 UTC, September 25) as a Category 2-equivalent typhoon. As the typhoon re-entered the South China Sea, it was met with a neutral environment for development, but was able to re-consolidate and form a 17 nautical miles (31 km; 20 mi) eye. Noru left the PAR at 20:00 PHT (12:00 UTC) and subsequently the PAGASA ceased issuing bulletins for the typhoon. Returning to favorable conditions over the South China Sea, Noru re-intensified to a Category 4-equivalent super typhoon on September 27, reaching 10-minute maximum sustained winds of 155 km/h (100 mph). Interaction with the land on the Vietnam coast and easterly wind shear slightly weakened the typhoon prior to landfall. At 21:00 UTC, the cyclone made landfall just south of Da Nang, Vietnam; the JTWC released its final warning on the storm shortly after. Noru rapidly weakened as it moved westward and further inland, weakening to a tropical storm by 06:00 UTC, September 28. The JMA downgraded the storm to a tropical depression later that same day, and ceased advisories for the storm. The storm tracked further westward as a tropical depression and dissipated on September 30, 06:00 UTC.

== Preparations ==
=== Philippines ===
==== Highest Tropical Cyclone Wind Signal ====
Highest Tropical Cyclone Wind Signal issued by PAGASA for Noru (Karding) in each province. The white line represents the best track.

The PAGASA began releasing bulletins on the storm on September 22. Initially expected to remain a tropical depression, the agency raised the possibility of raising tropical cyclone wind signals up to Signal No. 1. The PAGASA began raising Signal No. 1 as early as September 23; signals were first raised in Isabela and Aurora. The Flood Forecasting and Warning Section of the PAGASA (PAGASA-FFWS) also issued advisories in parts of Ifugao and Isabela which were next to the Magat River — the main spillway of the Magat Dam, which was nearby the storm's forecast track. The National Telecommunications Commission also instructed telecommunications companies to ensure sufficient resources in areas forecast to be affected by the storm.

On September 24, the Magat Dam began discharging excess water at a rate of 200 cubic centimetres (12 cu in) per second in preparation for the storm. The PAGASA also began raising Signal No. 2 in parts of Isabela, Aurora, and the Polillo Islands. Now expected to reach typhoon intensity, the agency warned of the possibility of raising Signal No. 4 as the storm neared. In Cagayan and Isabela, farmers harvested their crops early in preparation. The Office of Civil Defense (OCD) in Cagayan Valley was put on red alert; bans on sailing, fishing, and the sale of liquor were imposed on the region. The Department of Social Welfare and Development (DSWD) and the provincial disaster agency for Cagayan also secured funds for immediate response and prepared food packs and personnel throughout the region. The OCD in the Bicol region also went on blue alert, bracing for the effects of the enhanced southwest monsoon. The National Disaster Risk Reduction and Management Council (NDRRMC) was also put on red alert as it activated its Emergency Operations Center teams. The Armed Forces of the Philippines and the Metropolitan Manila Development Authority also prepared for the impacts of the storm. The Mines and Geosciences Bureau also warned of landslides and flooding in parts of Nueva Vizcaya, Quirino, and Cagayan. The Department of Public Works and Highways (DPWH) also closed Kennon Road, a major yet hazardous road that connects La Union and Baguio in Benguet, citing public safety reasons. The DPWH also began preparing quick response teams consisting of maintenance personnel and equipment which will oversee the possibility of roads in affected areas. The Philippine Red Cross prepared its volunteers, which included operations staff and on-the-ground personnel. Telecommunications companies PLDT, Smart, and Globe prepared their free calling and charging stations for rapid deployment. On the evening of September 24 (PHT), Signal No. 3 was raised in the Polillo Islands and in parts of Camarines Norte.

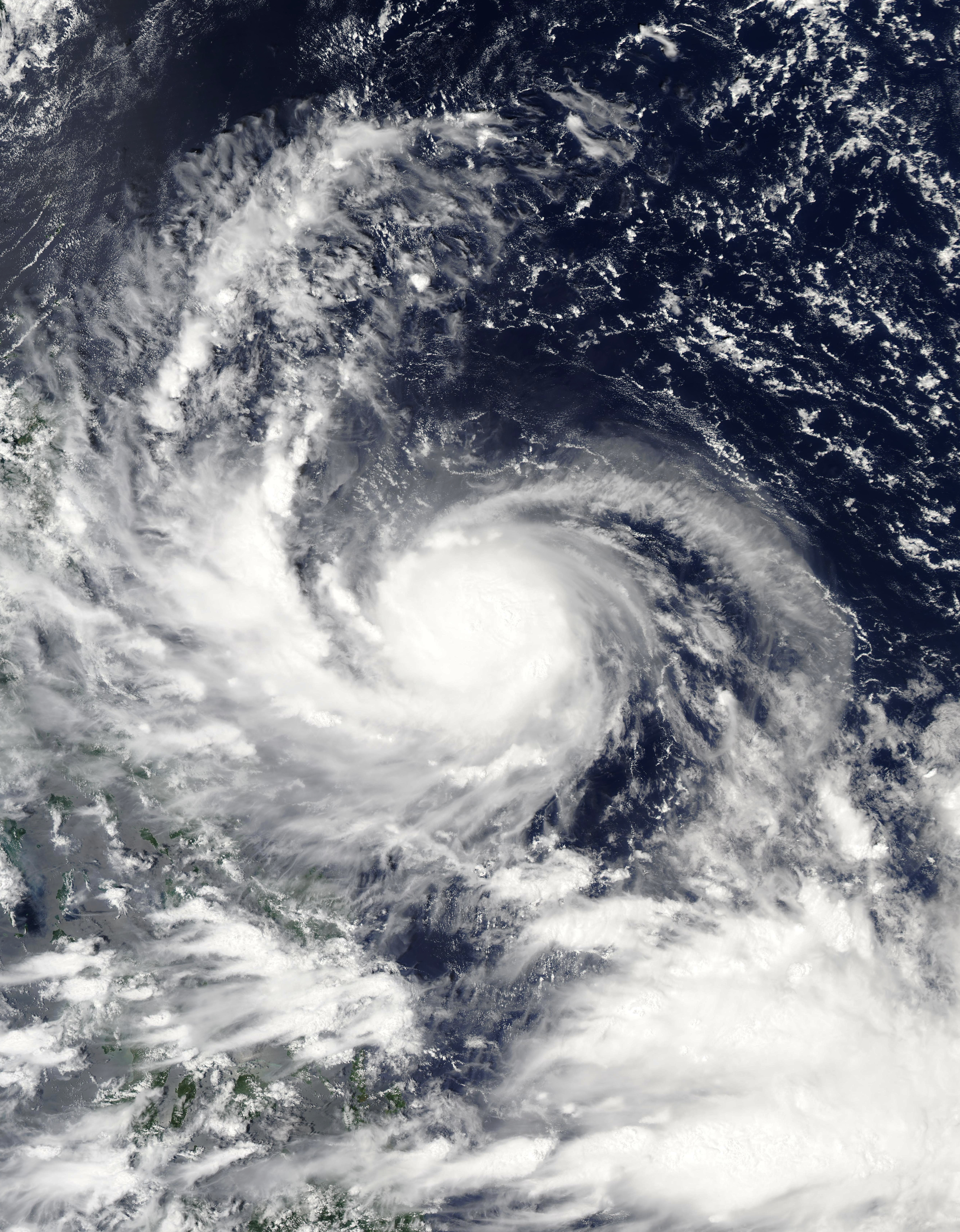
Severe Tropical Storm Noru approaching the Philippines on September 24

In the morning of September 25 (PHT), following a sustained period of rapid intensification, the PAGASA assessed the storm's development into a super typhoon. Subsequently, the agency began raising Signal No. 4, starting with the Polillo Islands. A landfall as a super typhoon was not ruled out, with the agency expecting to raise its highest wind signal level, Signal No. 5, as the storm passes. Quezon, Bicol, and Baguio's local disaster agencies were placed on red alert. At 11:00 PHT (03:00 UTC), Signal No. 5 was raised in the Polillo Islands and the extreme northern portion of Quezon; the PAGASA would later raise the signal in parts of seven other provinces, while signal number 4 being raised at western Luzon.

Coastal areas were warned of storm surges in coastal areas. The Pampanga, Agno, Cagayan, and Pasig–Marikina river basins, including the Magat sub-basin, were also placed under a flood watch by the PAGASA-FFWS. The Philippine Institute of Volcanology and Seismology also raised lahar advisories for Mount Pinatubo and the Taal Volcano. The cities and lone municipality of Metro Manila, with the exception of Makati, all independently declared the suspensions of classes on all levels for the following day, September 26 (a Monday). Classes for September 26 were also suspended by local government units on all levels in parts of Calabarzon and Central Luzon. Courts in Metro Manila, Central Luzon, Calabarzon, and Bicol were ordered closed by the Supreme Court on September 26. On the evening of September 25 (PHT), the Office of the President released a memorandum suspending work in government offices and classes in all levels of public schools in Metro Manila and in the Ilocos Region, Cagayan Valley, Central Luzon, Calabarzon, Mimaropa, the Bicol Region, and the Cordillera Administrative Region for September 26.

The United States Embassy in the Philippines and the Philippine Stock Exchange also declared work and operations suspensions for September 26. National Collegiate Athletic Association and Shakey's Super League games were canceled as the storm neared Metro Manila — under Signal No. 3 at the time; the Philippine Basketball Association also postponed its games slated for September 25 to 27. Muntinlupa, Quezon City, and the province of Quezon both began forced evacuations of their residents on September 25. The NDRRMC reported 91,169 people — 23,151 families — preemptively evacuated.

=== Vietnam ===
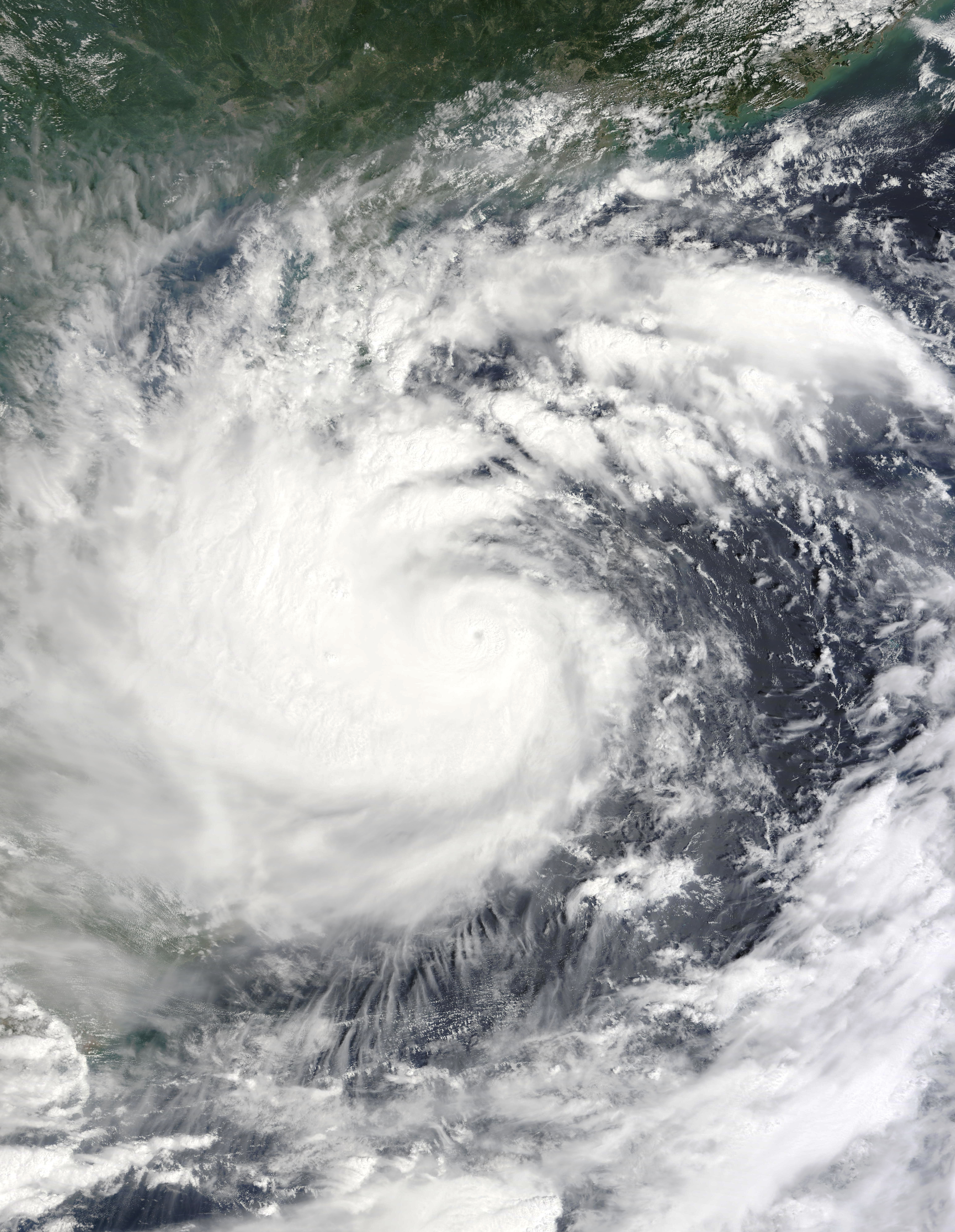
Typhoon Noru at its secondary peak intensity, prior to landfall in Vietnam, on September 27

Local communities in the country called for residents to evacuate from risky areas. Da Nang and three other provinces. Da Nang authorities have also ordered people to stay indoors from 8 pm on September 27 until further notice. More than 100,000 households of 400,000 people were evacuated as Noru neared. Approximately 270,000 military personnel were placed on standby. Hundreds of flights were canceled. At least 327,937 people were evacuated across the provinces. A curfew was imposed and a curfew was effective, which started on September 29 in Quang Nam and Da Nang.

== Impact ==
Deaths and missings by country
Region	Deaths	Missing	Ref.
Philippines	12	5	
Vietnam	9	0	
Cambodia	16	0	
Thailand	3	0	
Total	40	5	

=== Philippines ===
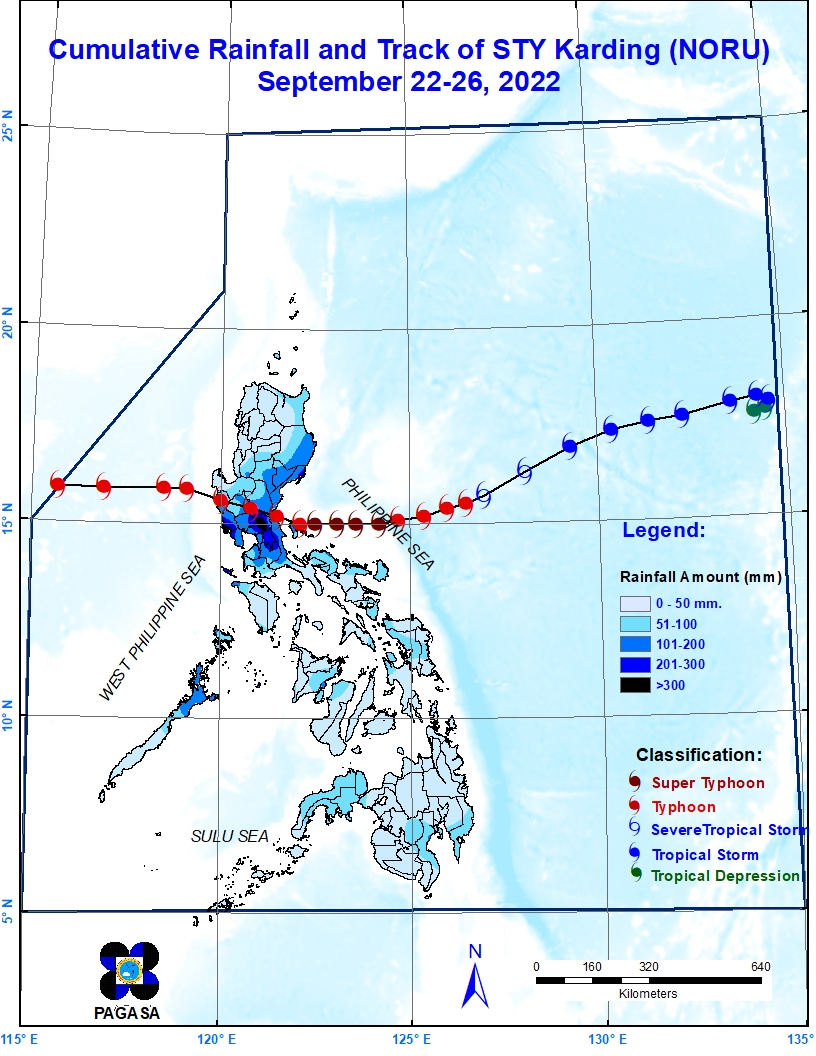
Cumulative Rainfall from Typhoon Noru

Noru made multiple landfalls over the Philippine archipelago both as a super typhoon (based on the classification used by the PAGASA) and as a high-end typhoon. Its second landfall occurred in the evening of September 26, crossing Central Luzon over the course of the night until it emerged over Zambales at 04:00 PHT (20:00 UTC). As a storm in late September, Noru struck just before the harvesting season of rice, which is extensively produced in central and northern Luzon — both within the track of the storm.

As ports suspended travel on September 24, 85 roll-on/roll-off cargo ships and at least 742 passengers were reported stranded by the Philippine Coast Guard. By the following day, over 1,200 passengers, 297 roll-on/roll-off ships, and 41 other vessels were stranded in ports of the Calabarzon and Bicol regions. Boat trips in the Bicol region, Batangas, and Mindoro were suspended. 84 flights, 12 international and 72 domestic, were cancelled due to inclement weather. 67 ports were rendered non-operational in areas of Quezon and Batangas. LRT Line 1, LRT Line 2, MRT Line 3, and the PNR Metro Commuter Line all suspended trips for September 25, with the PNR also suspending trips for the 26th. The NDRRMC reported at least 2,737 passengers, 260 rolling cargoes, and 37 other vehicles stranded in parts of southern Luzon.

Typhoon Noru making landfall in Pollilo Islands and Dingalan, Aurora on September 25

Communication outages were experienced in at least 6 areas in Calabarzon and the Ilocos Region. Nueva Ecija and Aurora were disconnected from the power grid, as determined by the National Grid Corporation of the Philippines. Quezon, Pampanga, and Tarlac also experienced partial outages. Numerous banks, including the government-controlled Land Bank of the Philippines, also closed affected Luzon branches on September 26. The Department of Education estimated damages to schools of up to ₱112 million (US$2.27 million). As of September 30, 2022, reports of the storm's damages by the NDRRMC value infrastructural damages at ₱304 million (US$6.18 million). Over 50,025 houses were partially destroyed and 6,891 totally destroyed.

Prior to its impact, the Department of Agriculture (DA) estimated 1,469,037 hectares (3,630,070 acres) hectares of rice, 75.83% of the national standing rice crops, and 281,322 hectares (695,160 acres) of corn, 52.73% of the national standing corn crops, to be affected by the storm. The NDRRMC reported agricultural damages up to ₱3.05 billion (US$62 million), affecting 166,630 hectares (411,800 acres) hectares of land and losing worth 159,867.35 metric tons (157,342.49 long tons; 176,223.59 short tons) of produce. In Polillo Island, where the storm made landfall as a PAGASA super typhoon, storm surges destroyed boats of fishermen and winds destroyed all banana trees in the area.

Marikina raised its third and highest alarm and began forced evacuations as the Marikina River rose to 18 meters (59 ft) ASL, reminiscent of Typhoon Ketsana (Ondoy), which struck exactly 13 years prior. All gates of the Manggahan Floodway were opened to divert excess water to Laguna de Bay. The local disaster agency of Marikina reported 5,024 people evacuated from flood-prone areas. Water levels in the Marikina River went back to normal by 14:30 PHT on September 26. Heavy rainfall in Valenzuela caused the evacuation of 793 people. Flooding was reported in 144 areas, most coming from the Central Luzon region.

Twelve people were killed and another five went missing following the storm. Five rescuers were killed following a flash flood while conducting rescue operations in San Miguel, Bulacan. The NDRRMC reported a total of 1,072,282 people affected. A total of 264,321 were evacuated, both before and during the typhoon's onslaught.

=== Vietnam ===
On the morning of September 28, Typhoon Noru made landfall in Da Nang and Quảng Nam. According to the Vietnam Meteorological and Hydrological Administration (VMHA), Noru made landfall with winds of Force 10-11 on the Beaufort scale which ranges from 89–117 km/h (55–73 mph) and is equivalent to a Severe Tropical Storm . The VMHA also stated that Vietnam's assessment of the typhoon's intensity at landfall was closer to reality, and that international meteorological agencies, including the JTWC in United States, the China Meteorological Administration (CMA) in Beijing, and the Hong Kong Observatory (HKO), had overestimated the typhoon's strength upon making landfall in Vietnam. On islands near the central coast of Vietnam, a weather station on Chàm Islands recorded sustained winds of 104 km/h (65 mph) and gusts of 156 km/h (97 mph), while another station on Lý Sơn Island measured sustained winds of 94 km/h (58 mph) and gusts of 122 km/h (76 mph). In mainland Vietnam, only two weather stations in Quảng Nam recorded tropical storm-force winds (wind speeds at these stations ranged from 76–83 km/h), while all other stations on land reported sustained winds below tropical storm-force winds.

Power outages were reported in Da Nang and Thừa Thiên Huế. 3,364 houses were damaged, along with 7,346 others that were flooded and 6,000 hectares of crops. Flooding occurred in Quảng Nam, which is home to the popular beach resort city of Da Nang. More than 300 schools in Nghệ An have been closed due to flash floods or heavy rain. In all, Noru was responsible for nine deaths. In the province of Nghệ An, floodings caused by Noru inflicted substantial damages that worth approximately 1 trillion VND (US$41.8 million). After it made landfall, it weakened into a Tropical Storm. In Thừa Thiên Huế province, attributable property damages caused by Noru and its floodings reached 1.102 trillion VND (US$45.8 million). Noru also affected Quảng Ngãi province with losses within the province amounted to 500 billion VND (US$20.7 million).

=== Cambodia ===
According to civil protection, 16 people have drowned in flooding near the Mekong River in Cambodia as of September 27. 60 families in Mongkul Borei and 30 families in the Banteay Meanchey and Preah Vihear provinces have been evacuated.

=== Thailand ===
Noru brought heavy rains, causing severe flooding in Surin. Provinces that are located at east of Bangkok were also affected by heavy rain. The Department of Disaster Prevention and Mitigation (DDPM) reported 3,121 households were damaged. At least three were killed and two were injured. Noru dissipated near western Thailand.

=== Laos ===
Typhoon Noru affected 61 villages and caused flooding in Attapeu, Saravane, Sekong, and Champasak provinces. More than 2,000 people were evacuated in Sanxay district. 512 households were affected in Sanamxay, 831 in Sammakkhixay, 1,402 in Soukhoumma and 32 in Lao Ngam district. Power lines were knocked down.

== Aftermath ==
=== Philippines ===
As of October 3, 2022, the NDRRMC reports ₱59.8 million (US$1.21 million) worth of assistance provided to those affected by the typhoon. The assistance provided varies, both in type and agency responsible, with most of the relief provided being food packs from the DSWD.

Nueva Ecija declared a province-wide state of calamity following significant damages to local agriculture and infrastructure, as reported by the local government; state of calamities automatically sets price freezes for basin necessities and liquefied petroleum gas. Numerous municipalities in Central Luzon and in the Quezon province declared a state of calamity. Meanwhile, prices of crops in Cagayan Valley climbed due to a loss of supply from farms where crops were affected, particularly farms in Nueva Vizcaya. Some municipalities in Central Luzon and the entire province of Nueva Ecija also declared class suspensions for September 27. The Department of Education later assessed at least ₱1.17 billion (US$23.8 million) was required to repair 165 schools that needed repair.

Following the storm's impact, calls for the preservation of the Sierra Madre mountain range were renewed on social media and by local organizations. This coincided with "Save Sierra Madre Day", initially started following the onslaught of Typhoon Ketsana in 2009. The mountain range, which serves as a natural barrier protecting much of eastern Luzon from tropical cyclones, has been the subject of destructive human activity, most notably the recent construction of the Kaliwa Dam in the Quezon province.

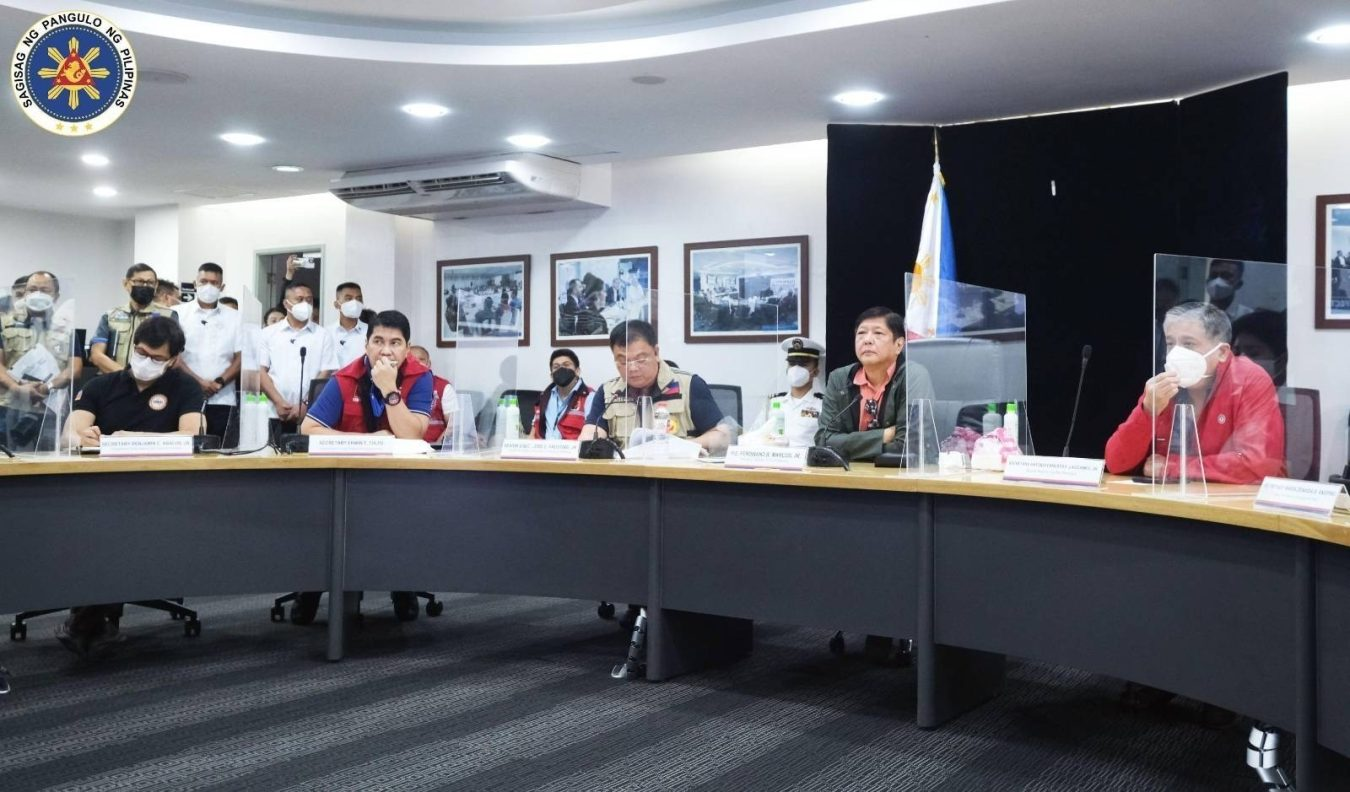
Government officials at a situation briefing of the NDRRMC.

Philippine President and Agriculture Secretary Bongbong Marcos was criticized by netizens on social media after he had posted a vlog on the evening of September 25 (PHT), recapping a recent working visit to the United States during the 77th session of the United Nations General Assembly. Critics trended #NasaanAngPangulo (tl. "Where is the president") on social media and called the move insensitive, citing the undergoing evacuations, expected agricultural losses, and affected farmers and fisherfolk. Marcos later stated that he preferred to leave the response to local and state officials, not wishing to disturb them. He would later perform aerial inspections over Bulacan, Nueva Ecija, and Tarlac. On September 26, DSWD Secretary Erwin Tulfo made visits to municipalities in the provinces of Quezon and Aurora and led the distribution of financial aid to affected families. Three members of the Senate also made visits to San Miguel, Bulacan on September 30 to distribute aid. The Social Security System announced loans and pensions specifically for those affected by the typhoon.

Various non-profit and non-governmental organizations also extended aid to affected areas. UNICEF provided their concern for children along the track of the typhoon, stationing emergency supplies for immediate distribution. The Negrense Volunteers for Change Foundation provided meals specialized for toddlers and infants to Polillo Island. Philippine Red Cross staff and volunteers also provided meals in evacuation centers, helped in cleaning operations, and assisted evacuees returning to their homes. Angat Buhay staff and volunteers also monitored affected areas and distributed relief goods following the typhoon. Various organizations also began their own relief operations, donation drives, and fundraising events to assist affected individuals. The United States also brought assistance to affected families and supported logistics and telecommunications through the United States Agency for International Development. In a statement, United States Defense Secretary Lloyd Austin gave condolences to affected persons on behalf of the US Department of Defense.

Government officials gave tributes to the five rescuers killed by the typhoon while performing rescue operations. On September 27, the Senate of the 19th Congress of the Philippines adopted a resolution commending "the extraordinary heroism of five members of Bulacan Province's Disaster Risk Reduction Management Office who died in the line of duty": George Agustin, Troy Justin Agustin, Marby Bartolome, Narciso Calayag Jr., and Jerson Resurrecion.

== Retirement ==
On May 5, 2023, the PAGASA retired the name Karding from its rotating naming lists due to the number of deaths and amount of damage it caused particularly in Luzon, and it will never be used again for another typhoon name within the Philippine Area of Responsibility (PAR); it will be replaced by Kiyapo to replace Karding for the 2026 season.

After the season, the Typhoon Committee announced that the name Noru, along with five others were removed from the naming lists. In the spring of 2024, the name was replaced with Hodu for future seasons, which means walnut in Korean.

== See also ==
- 2022 Pacific typhoon season
- Weather of 2022
- Tropical cyclones in 2022
- Typhoon Rita (Kading; 1978) – one of the strongest typhoons to make landfall in Polillo Island; affected the same regions as Noru, and had similar PAGASA name
- Typhoon Dot (Saling; 1985) – an intense typhoon which also severely affected Central Luzon during mid-October 1985.
- Typhoon Yunya (Diding; 1991) – a strong typhoon that hit Luzon during the eruption of Mount Pinatubo, took a similar trajectory also to Noru.
- Typhoon Xangsane (Milenyo; 2006) – a devastating typhoon that also somewhat made landfall in Luzon as a strong Category 4 typhoon, causing widespread damages including Metro Manila.
- Typhoon Ketsana (Ondoy; 2009) – a typhoon which affected Luzon as a tropical storm and had a similar path to Noru, causing the swelling of the Marikina River exactly 13 years prior.
- Typhoon Nesat (Pedring; 2011) – a moderate but destructive Category 4 typhoon that inflicted significant damages in Central Luzon.
- Typhoon Utor (Labuyo; 2013) – a rapidly-intensifying Category 4 super typhoon that left severe impacts to Central Luzon in August 2013.
- Typhoon Nari (Santi; 2013) – a typhoon which inflicted severe impacts in Central Luzon in October 2013.
- Typhoon Haiyan (Yolanda; 2013) – an extremely deadly Category 5-equivalent typhoon which hit the Visayas before dawn shortly making landfall.
- Typhoon Sarika (Karen; 2016) – a typhoon that also had a similar track and intensity to Noru but also hit in some same areas as a Category 4 typhoon.
- Typhoon Saudel (Pepito; 2020) – a category-1 typhoon that caused moderate damages in Central Luzon.
- Typhoon Goni (Rolly; 2020) – an extremely destructive Category 5-equivalent typhoon that hit the same areas two years prior and rapidly intensified over the same period. Also had a somewhat similar path to Noru.
- Typhoon Vamco (Ulysses; 2020) – another typhoon which had an identical trajectory to Noru.
