= 1990 Pacific typhoon season =

Pacific typhoon season

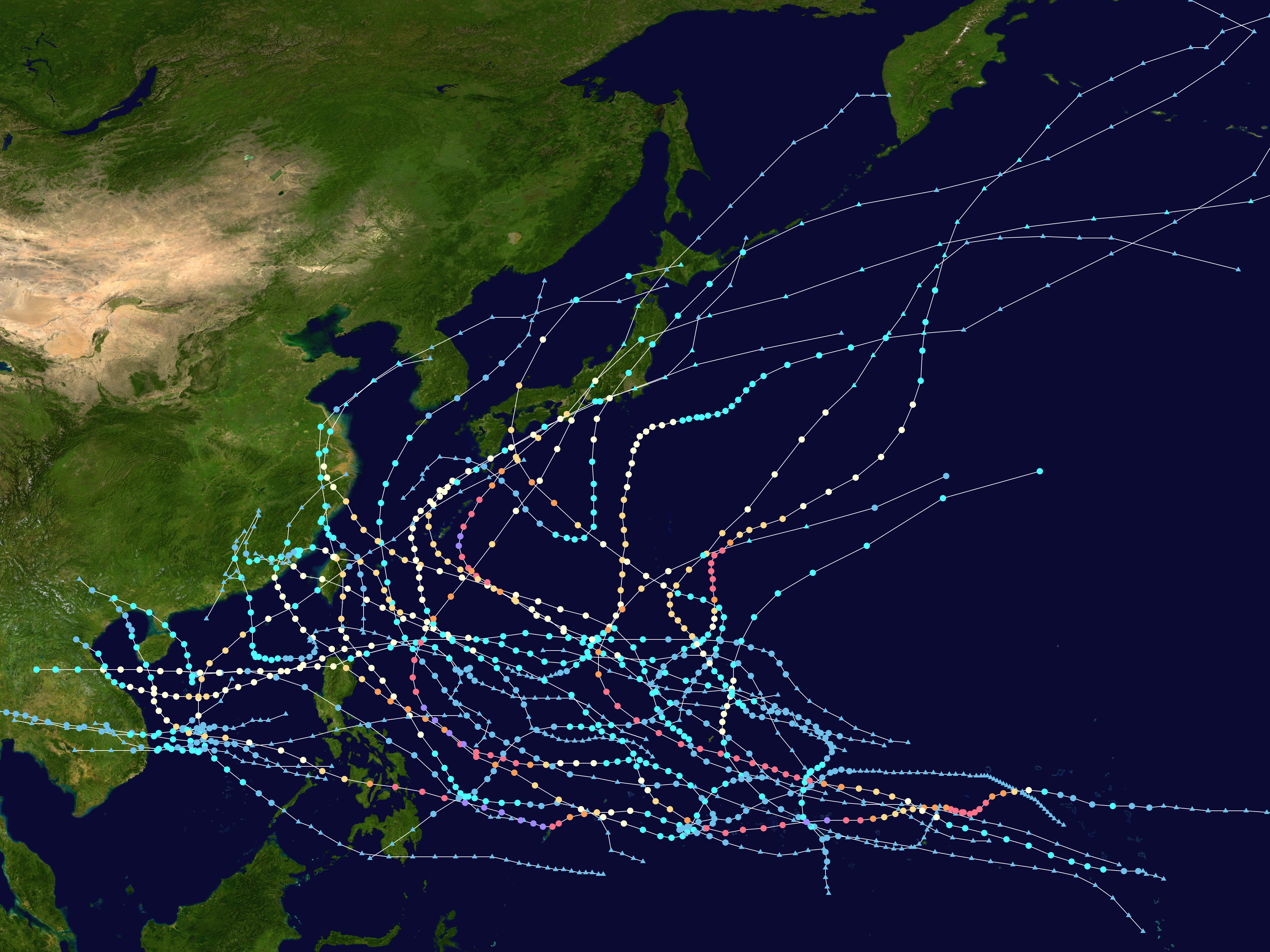
- Season summary map

Seasonal boundaries
- First system formed: January 12, 1990
- Last system dissipated: December 23, 1990

Strongest storm
- Name: Flo
  - Maximum winds: 220 km/h (140 mph) (10-minute sustained)
  - Lowest pressure: 890 hPa (mbar)

Seasonal statistics
- Total depressions: 41
- Total storms: 31
- Typhoons: 19
- Very strong typhoons: 6
- Violent typhoons: 2
- Total fatalities: 1,780 total
- Total damage: > $3.95 billion (1990 USD)

Related articles
- 1990 Atlantic hurricane season; 1990 Pacific hurricane season; 1990 North Indian Ocean cyclone season

The 1990 Pacific typhoon season was another active season, with 31 storms being named during the year. It had no official bounds; it ran year-round in 1990, but most tropical cyclones formed in the northwestern Pacific Ocean between May and November. These dates conventionally delimit the period of each year when most tropical cyclones form in the northwestern Pacific Ocean.

The scope of this article is limited to the Pacific Ocean, north of the equator and west of the International Date Line. Storms that form east of the date line and north of the equator are called hurricanes; see 1990 Pacific hurricane season. Tropical Storms formed in the entire west Pacific basin were assigned a name by the Joint Typhoon Warning Center. Tropical depressions in this basin have the "W" suffix added to their number. Tropical depressions that enter or form in the Philippine area of responsibility are assigned a name by the Philippine Atmospheric, Geophysical and Astronomical Services Administration or PAGASA. This can often result in the same storm having two names.

== Systems ==
41 tropical cyclones formed this year in the Western Pacific, of which 31 became tropical storms. 19 storms reached typhoon intensity, of which 4 reached super typhoon strength.

=== Severe Tropical Storm Koryn ===
- Severe tropical storm (JMA)
- Category 1 typhoon (SSHWS)
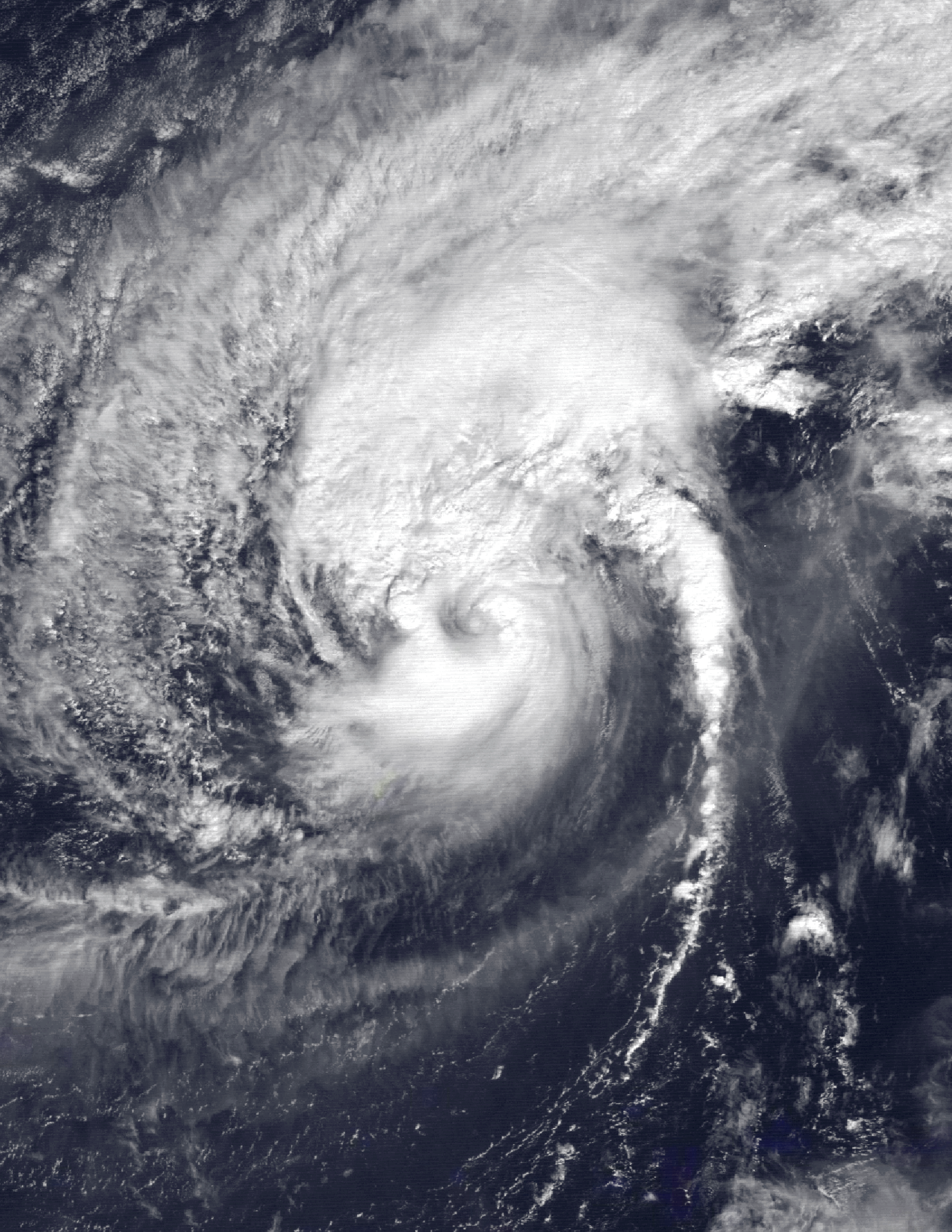
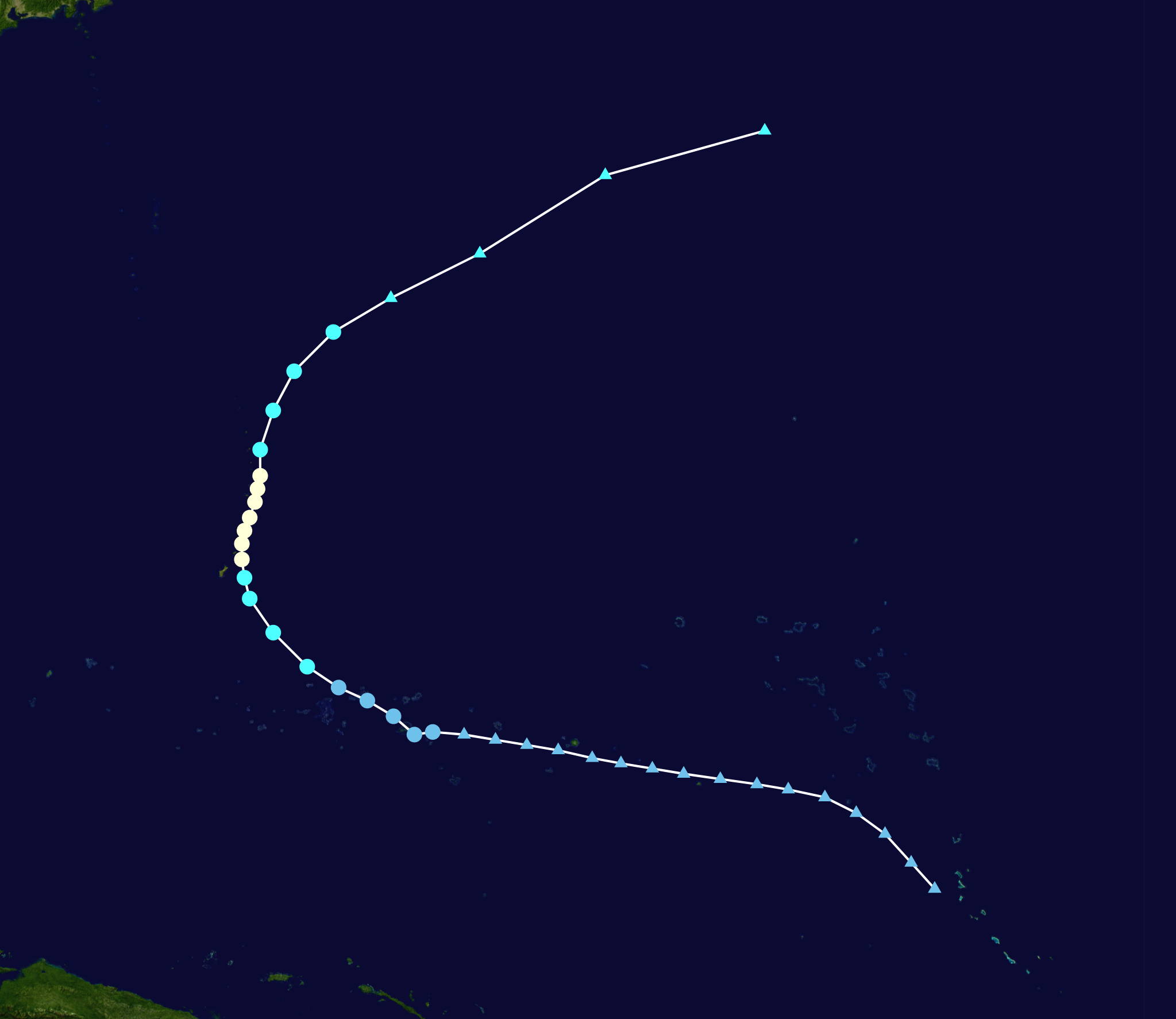
- Duration: January 12 – January 17
- Peak intensity: 100 km/h (65 mph) (10-min); 980 hPa (mbar)

On January 12, both the JMA and the JTWC identified a tropical depression in the northwest Pacific Ocean. The depression intensified over the period of a day to become a tropical storm on January 13, when it received the name Koryn from the JTWC. According to them, but not the JMA, Koryn reached typhoon strength on January 15, when it peaked in intensity. The storm then weakened quite rapidly until it became extratropical on January 17, at 0000 UTC.

=== Tropical Storm Lewis ===
- Tropical storm (JMA)
- Tropical storm (SSHWS)
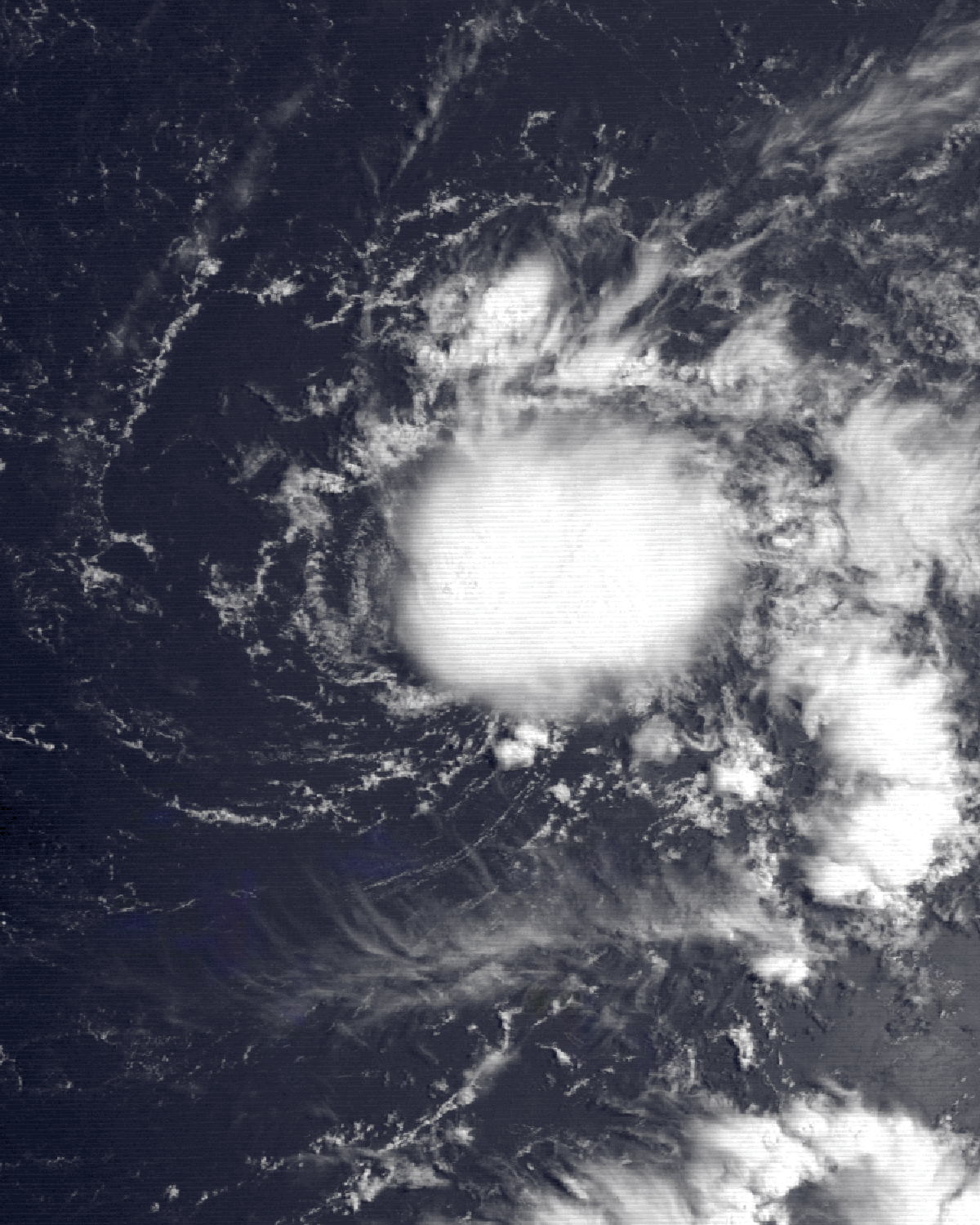
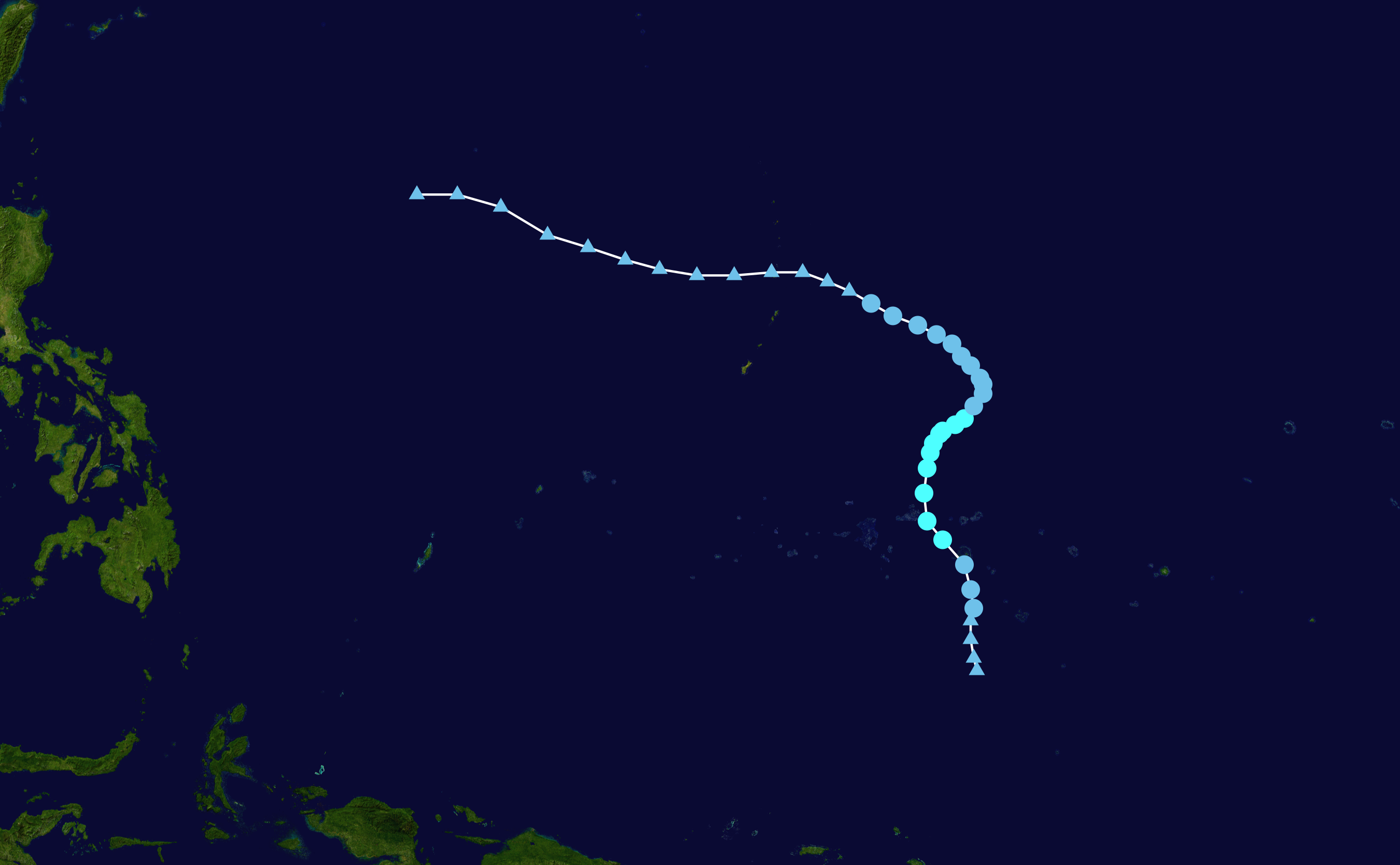
- Duration: April 26 – May 3
- Peak intensity: 65 km/h (40 mph) (10-min); 998 hPa (mbar)

A tropical disturbance formed 200 miles south of Chuuk on April 26. The system tracked northward and the JTWC named it Lewis a few days later on the 29th. Lewis struggled to maintain tropical storm strength as the top of the storm was sheared off by strong westerlies. The storm slowly dissipated over water on May 3.

=== Typhoon Marian ===
- Typhoon (JMA)
- Category 2 typhoon (SSHWS)
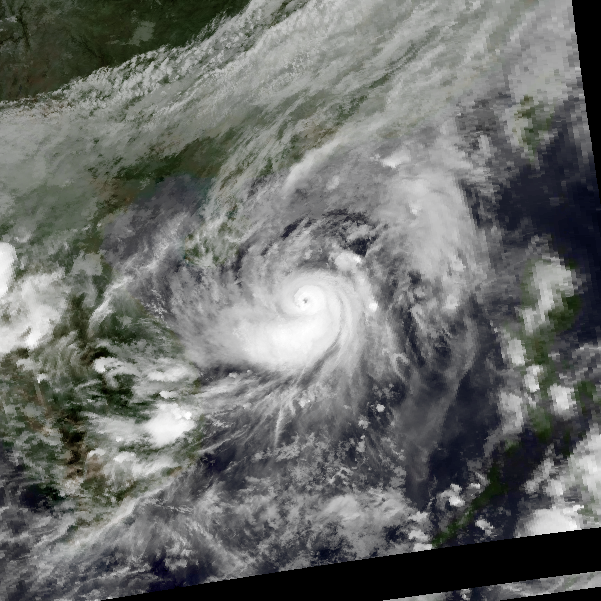
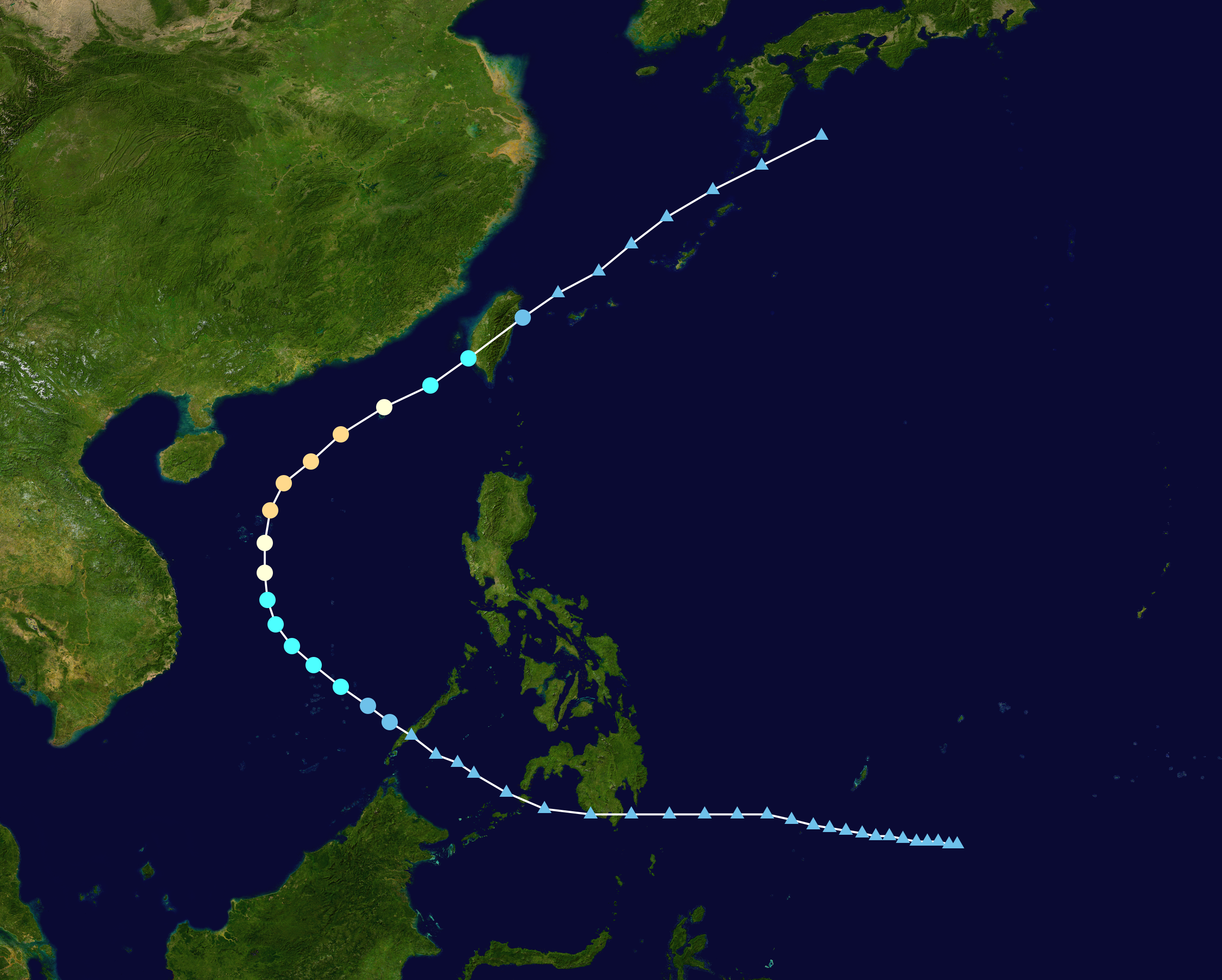
- Duration: May 14 – May 19
- Peak intensity: 130 km/h (80 mph) (10-min); 965 hPa (mbar)

An area of persistent convection formed in low latitudes south of Yap on May 9. The unorganized disturbance passed over the southern islands of the Philippines and was upgraded to a tropical storm, being named Marian on the 15th. The storm steadily intensified and reached peak intensity on the 17th. Marian began to recurve as it got caught up in an approaching cold front. Marian brushed Hong Kong and southern China, causing light rains and windy conditions. Marian made landfall on Taiwan on the 19th as a tropical storm. Despite being weak at landfall, Marian had a significant impact on Taiwan's agricultural industry, with losses at NT$270 million (US$10 million). Two fishermen were also swept away. Marian rapidly weakened from the mountainous terrain and transitioned to extratropical later that day.

=== Tropical Depression 04W ===
- Tropical depression (JMA)
- Tropical depression (SSHWS)
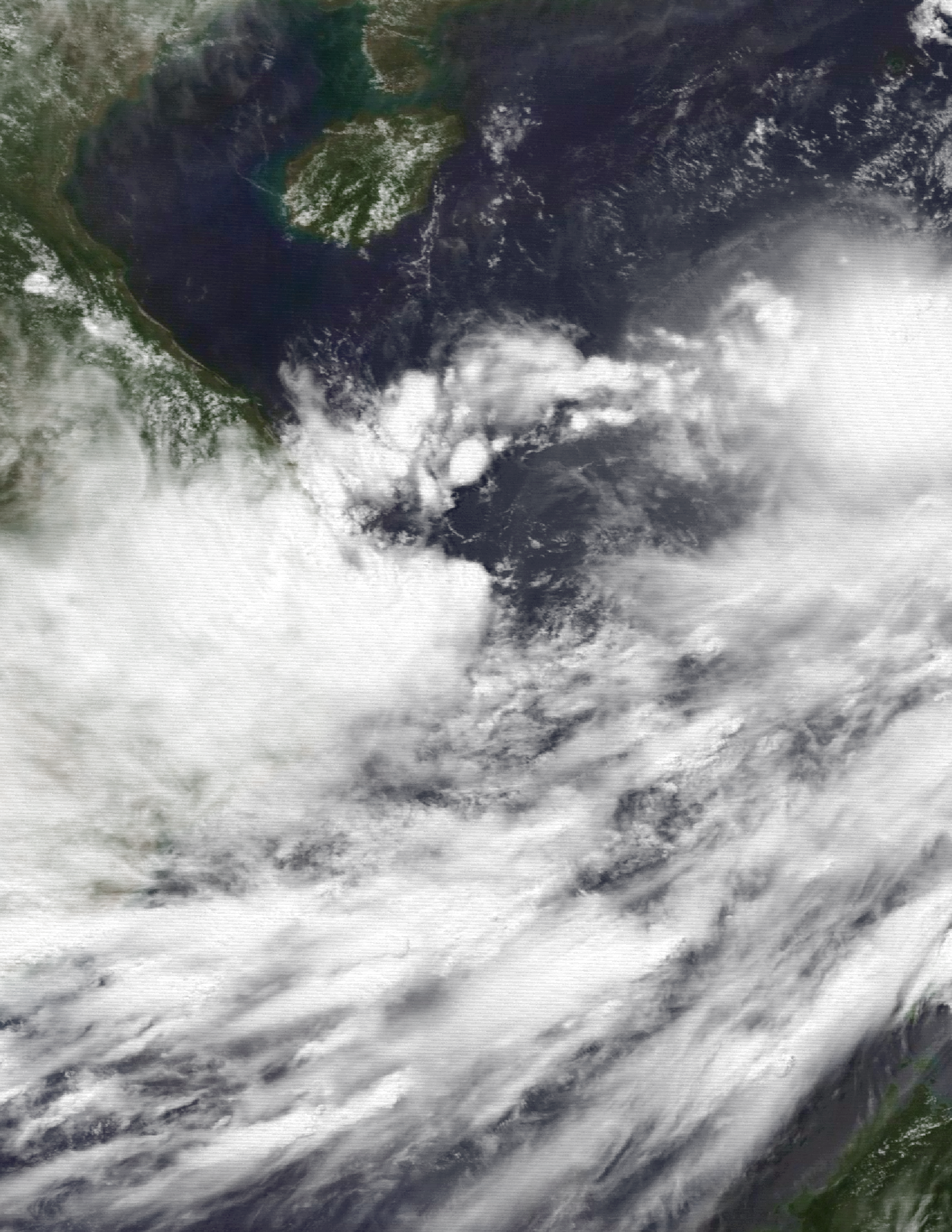
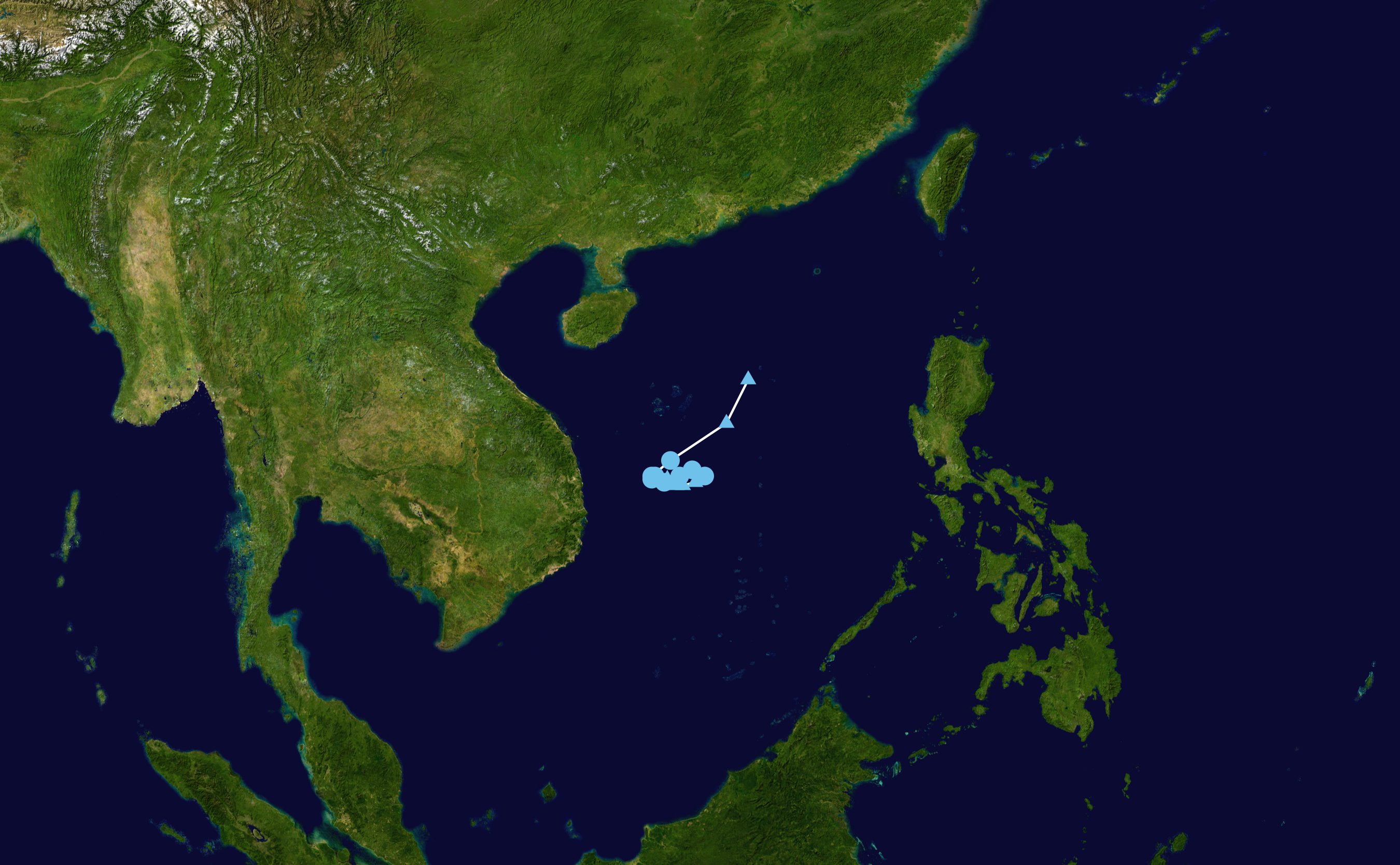
- Duration: June 13 – June 15
- Peak intensity: 55 km/h (35 mph) (1-min); 1000 hPa (mbar)

A weak low-level circulation formed in the South China Sea on June 14. Strong vertical shear prevented further development. The system was absorbed by Nathan when it entered the South China Sea.

=== Severe Tropical Storm Nathan (Akang) ===
- Severe tropical storm (JMA)
- Tropical storm (SSHWS)
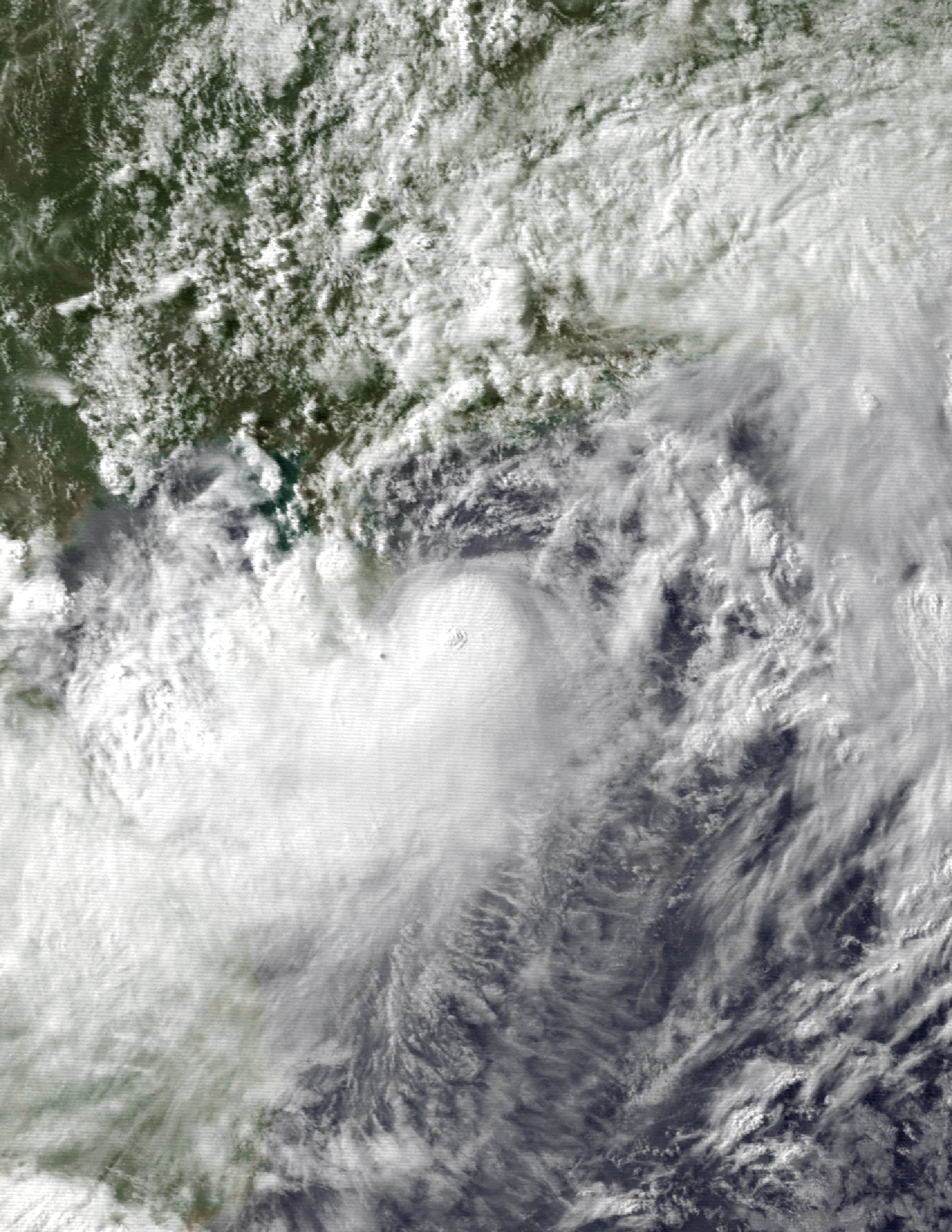
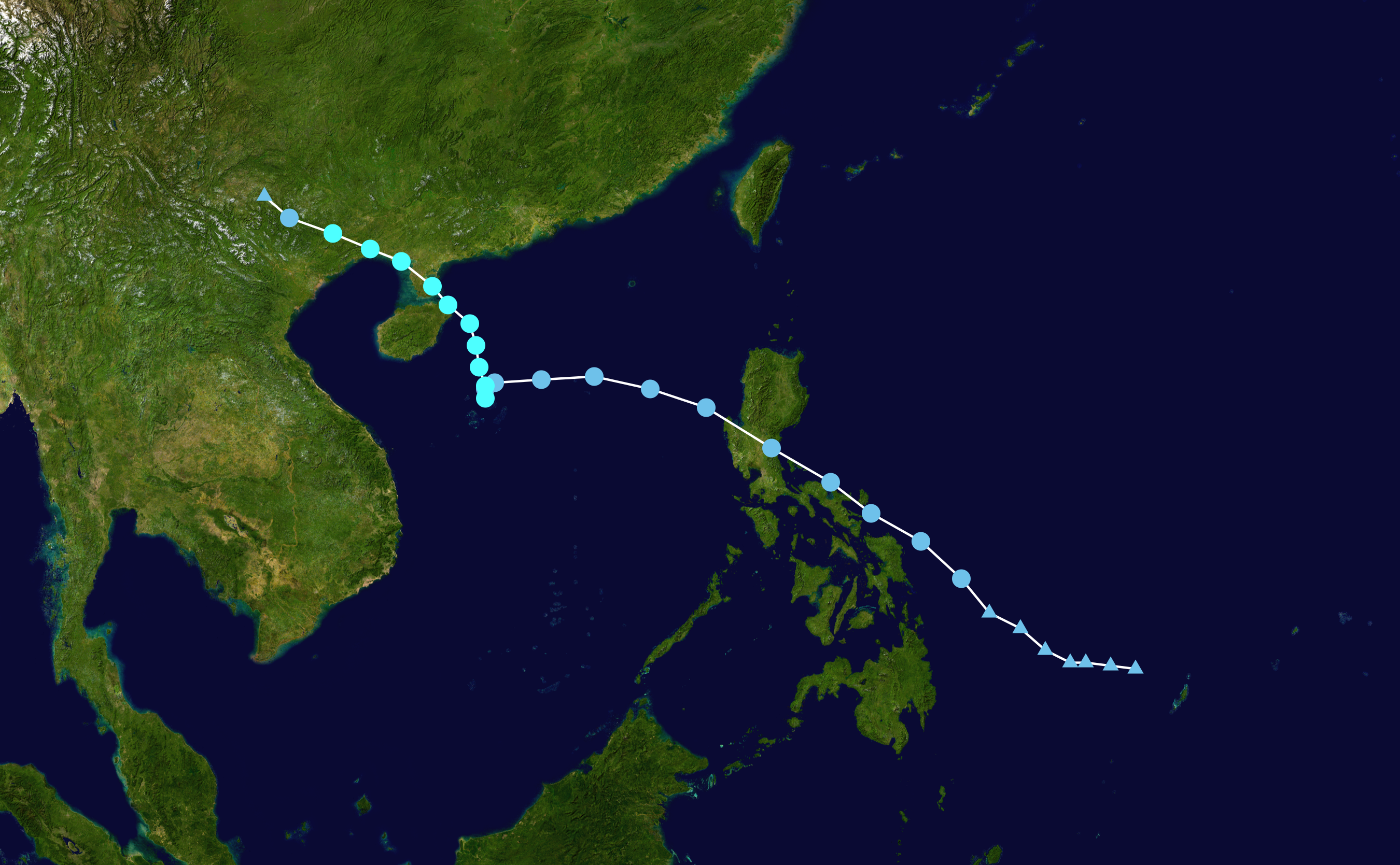
- Duration: June 14 – June 19
- Peak intensity: 100 km/h (65 mph) (10-min); 980 hPa (mbar)

A tropical disturbance formed on June 14 and trekked across the Philippines. The system created flooding across the entire archipelago, causing damages of ₱200 million (US$8.4 million), 64 deaths, and 8 missing. The depression was upgraded to Tropical Storm Nathan on the 16th. Nathan curved to the southwest as it interacted with Tropical Depression 04W. Nathan reached peak intensity of 65 mph (100 km/h) shortly before striking Hainan on the 18th. In the South China Sea, the cargo ship Tien Fu sank, killing 3 crewmen and leaving the captain missing. Two people drowned in Hong Kong. Similarly, two people were swept overboard and drowned in Macau. Torrential rains caused flooding in Guangdong, killing 10. Nathan caused about CN¥1.9 million (US$400,000) in Shantou. Nathan continued northwestwards, making its final landfall over the Vietnam/China border and dissipating over the mountains of northern Vietnam on the 19th.

=== Typhoon Ofelia (Bising) ===
- Typhoon (JMA)
- Category 2 typhoon (SSHWS)
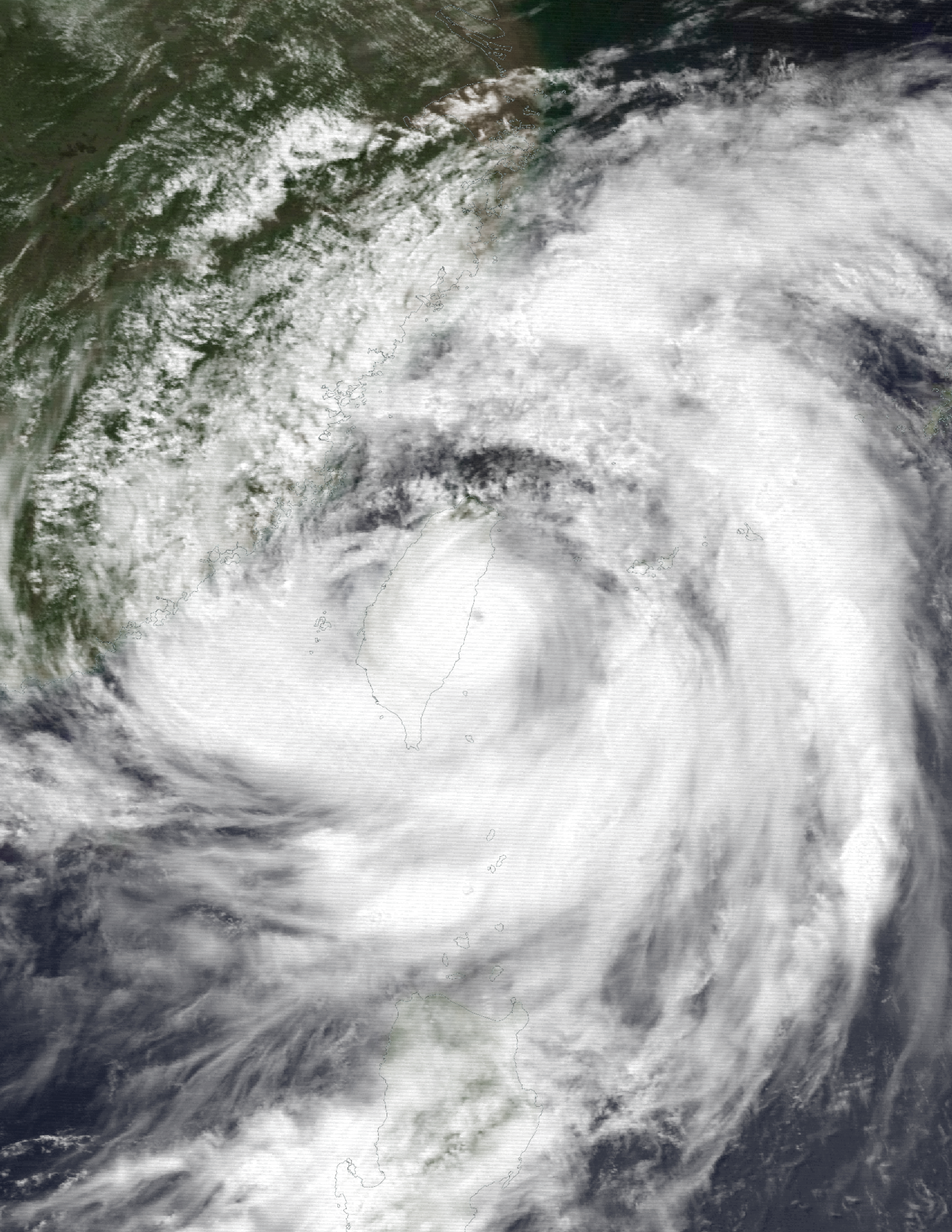
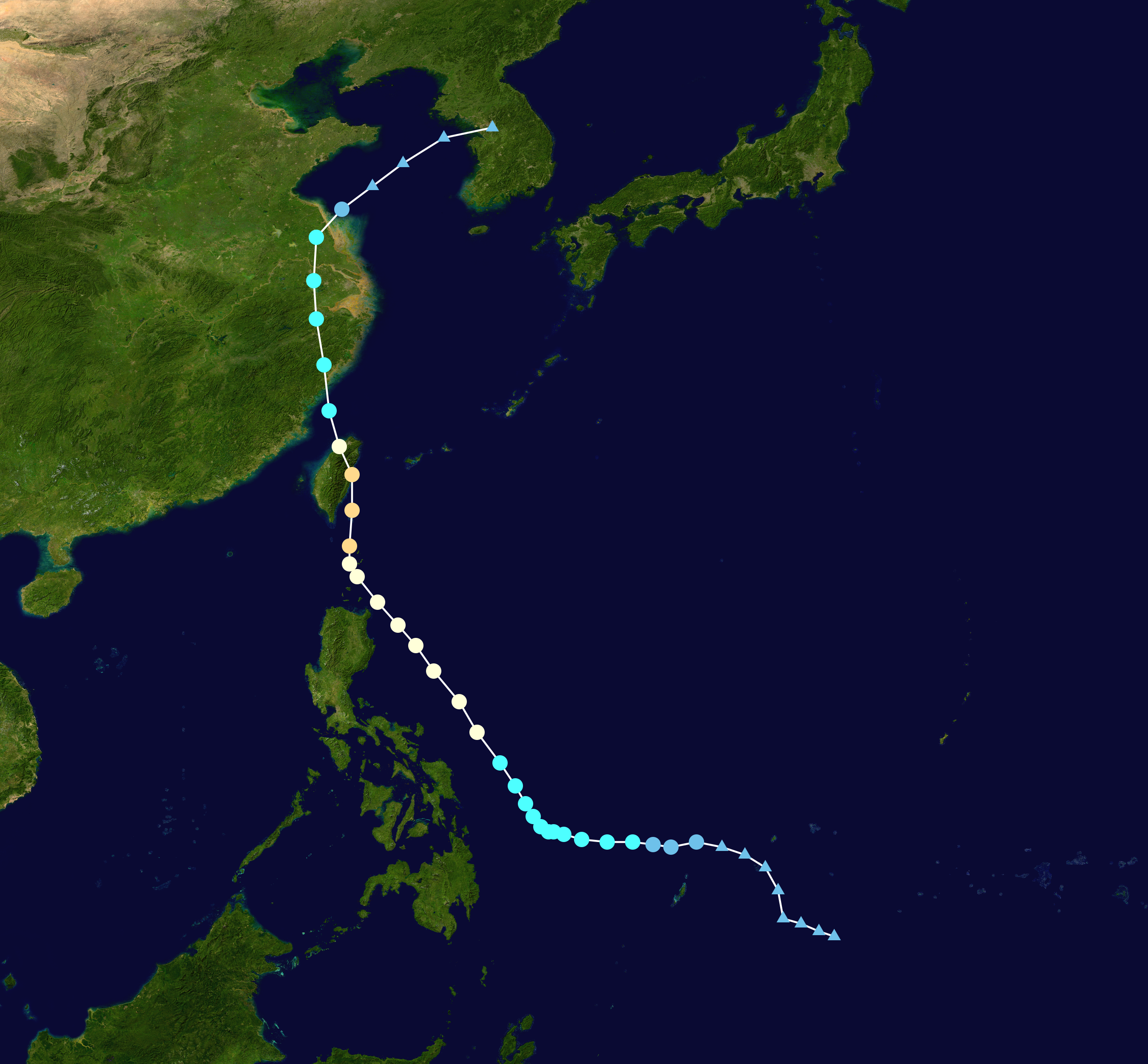
- Duration: June 16 – June 25
- Peak intensity: 120 km/h (75 mph) (10-min); 970 hPa (mbar)

An area of convection formed within the monsoon trough and became a tropical depression east of the Philippines on June 17. It tracked to northwestward, slowly organizing into a tropical storm the following day. The storm was named Ofelia. Initial vertical wind shear decreased and Ofelia intensified to a typhoon, peaking at 100 mph (155 km/h) as it approached Taiwan. Ofelia paralleled the Philippines, causing ₱60 million (US$2.5 million) in damages and 8 deaths. Ofelia made landfall over Taiwan on June 23, rapidly weakening before striking Zhejiang later that day. Torrental flooding in Taiwan caused devastating agricultural damage, with losses exceeding NT$2.55 billion (US$93 million), as well as 12 deaths and 25 missing. In China, CN¥338 million (US$114.7 million) in damages occurred in Fujian and Zhejiang. Over 30 deaths were reported as well. The storm merged with a frontal boundary while approaching the Korean Peninsula.

=== Typhoon Percy (Klaring) ===
- Typhoon (JMA)
- Category 4 typhoon (SSHWS)
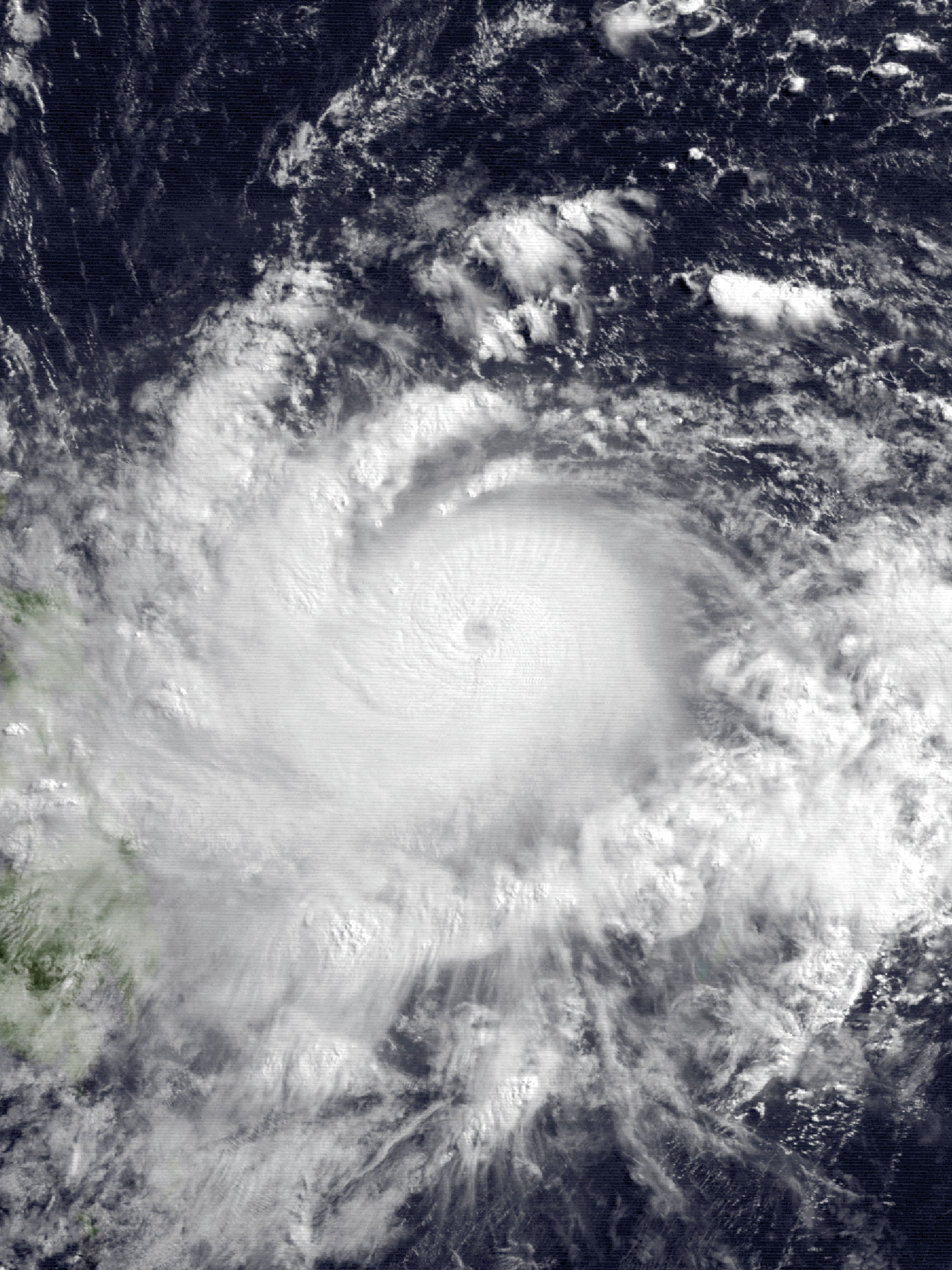
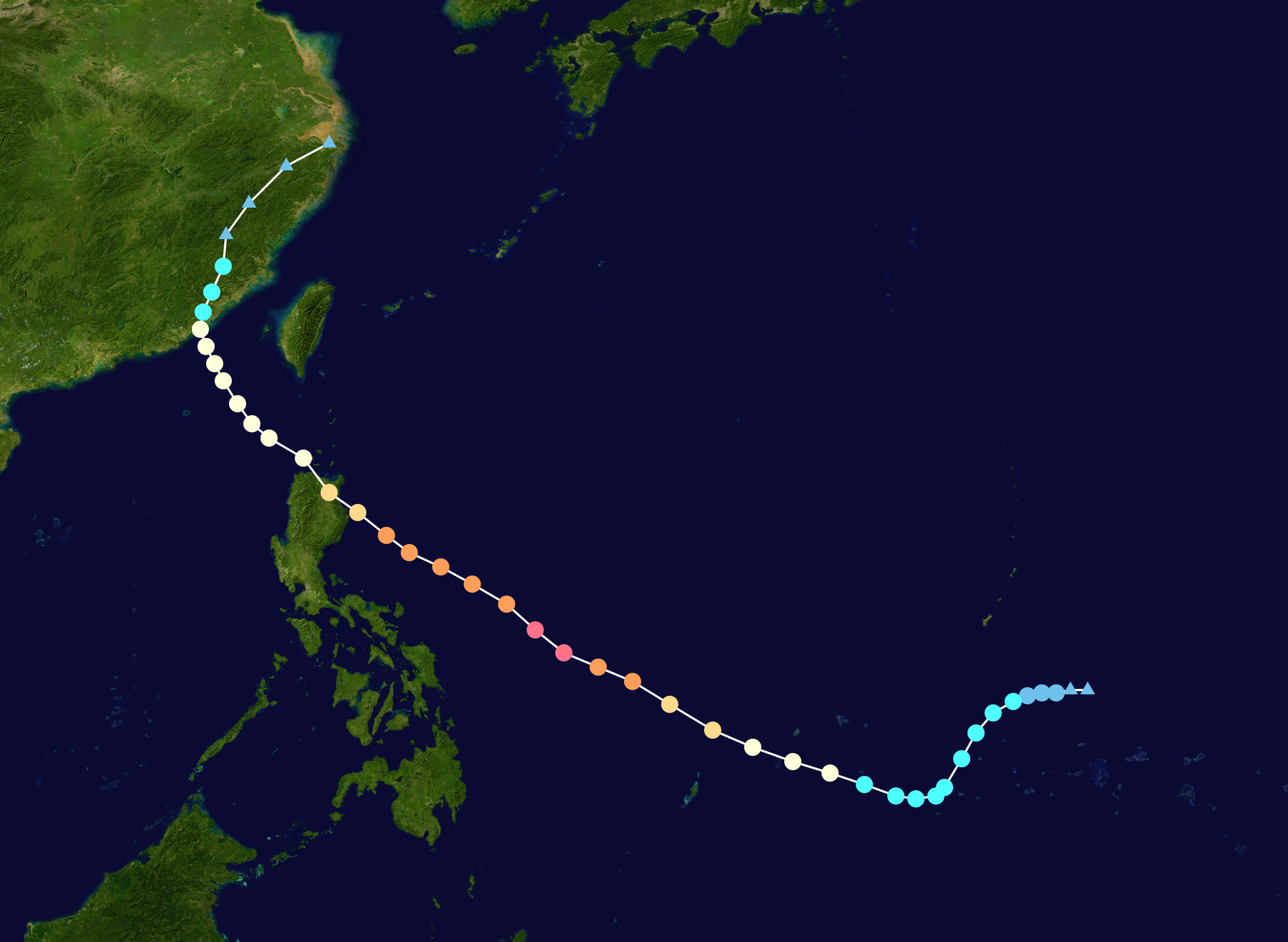
- Duration: June 20 – June 30
- Peak intensity: 150 km/h (90 mph) (10-min); 950 hPa (mbar)

An area of convection formed within the Caroline Islands at the eastern end of the monsoon trough. The disturbance rapidly intensified to a tropical storm, being named Percy on the 21st. Percy moved southwestward then curved northwestward towards the Philippines. Several islands of the western Caroline Islands, including Yap and Palau experienced devastating damage with one death reported on Palau. Percy developed an additional outflow channel and reached peak intensity of 130 mph (215 km/h) before slightly weakening and striking northern Luzon on the 27th. Eight deaths and two missing were reported but damage was minimal. Percy remained a weak typhoon until making landfall over southeastern China on the 29th. In Hong Kong, heavy rain caused flooding and one death. Over CN¥76 million (US$16 million) in damages, six killed, and 2 missing were reported in Guangdong and Fujian. Percy dissipated over land on the 30th, with its remnants causing further flooding in the Korean Peninsula and Japan.

=== Tropical Storm Robyn (Deling) ===
- Tropical storm (JMA)
- Tropical storm (SSHWS)
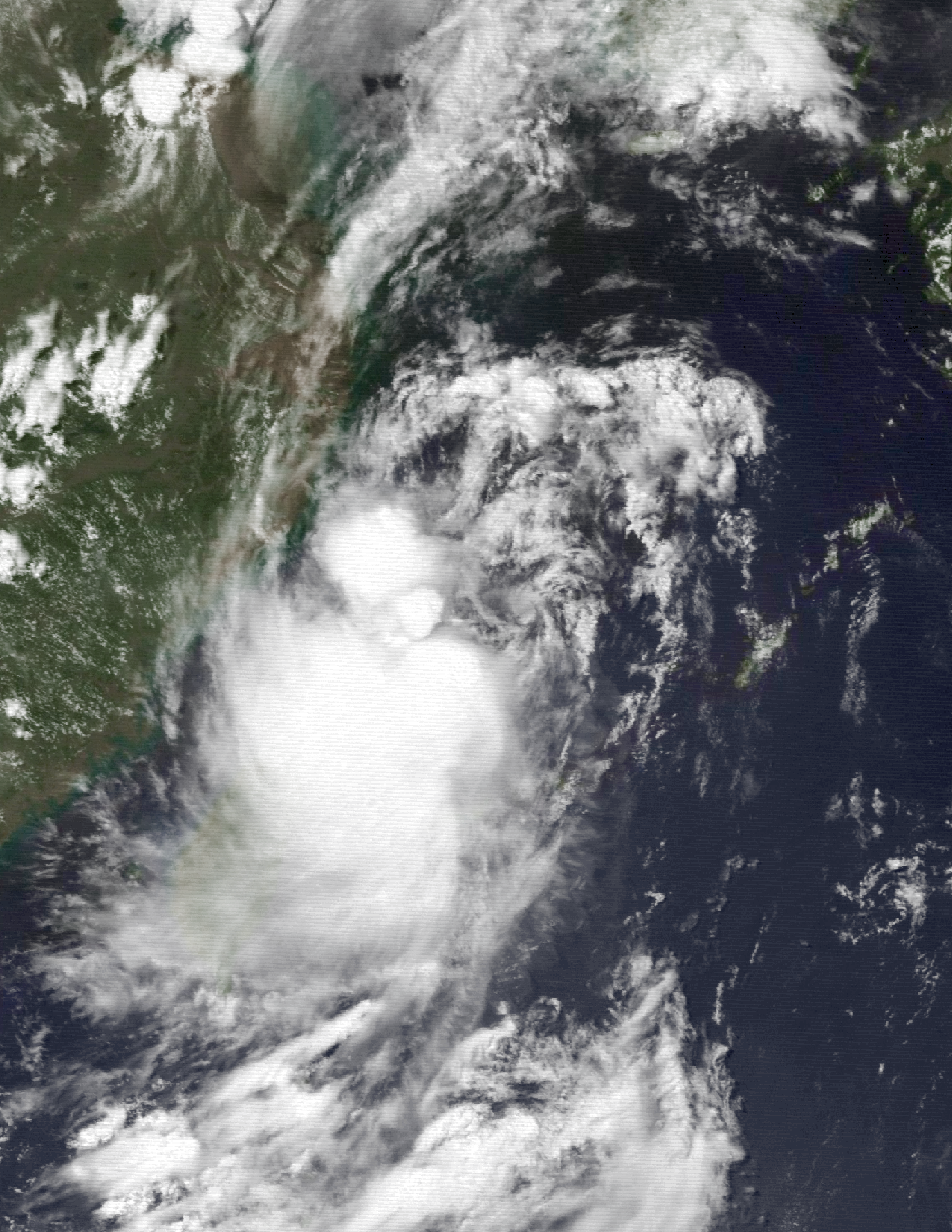
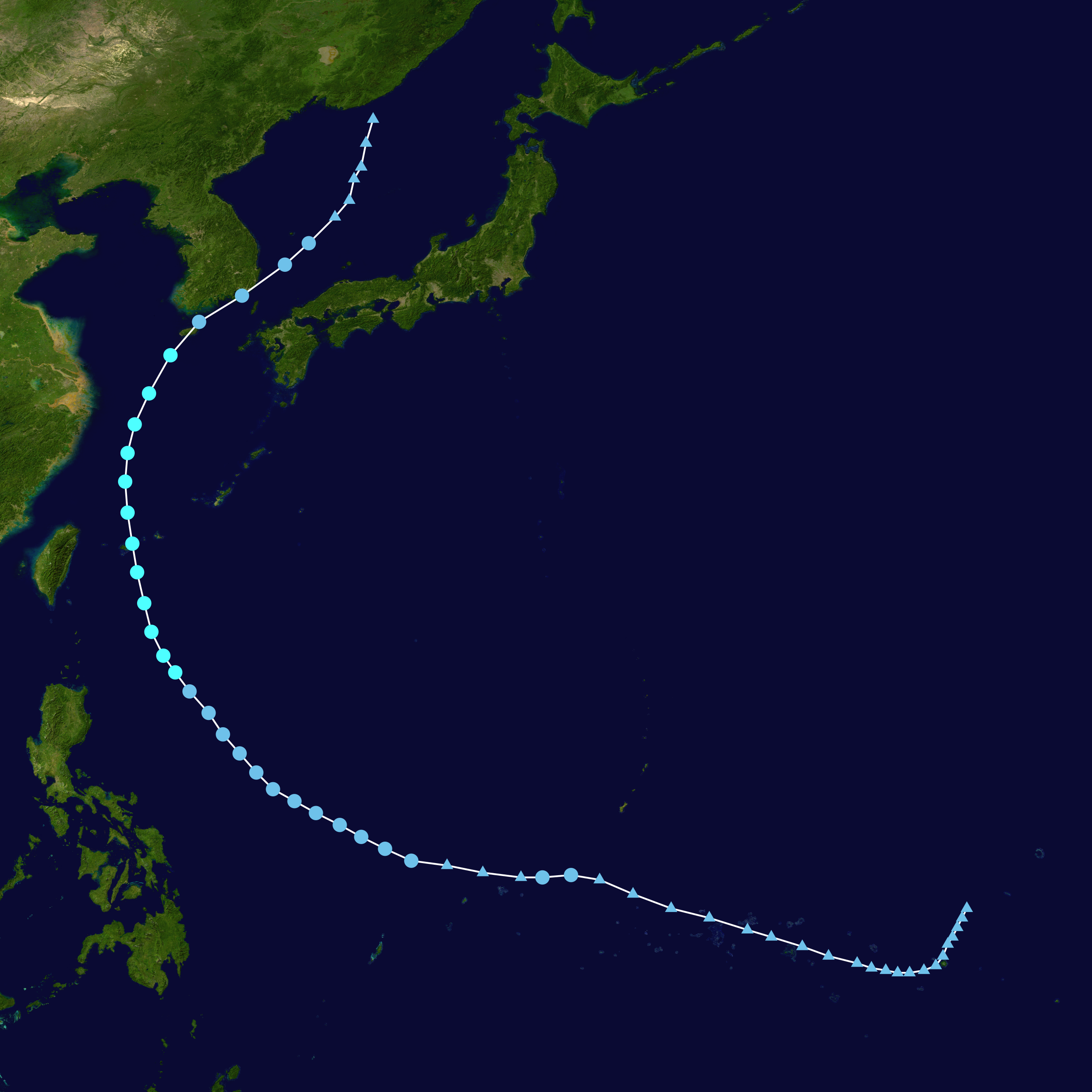
- Duration: July 4 – July 13
- Peak intensity: 85 km/h (50 mph) (10-min); 992 hPa (mbar)

The outskirts of the storm brought 244 mm (9.6 in) of rainfall to Vladivostok in the Russian Far East.

=== Severe Tropical Storm Tasha (Emang) ===
- Severe tropical storm (JMA)
- Tropical storm (SSHWS)
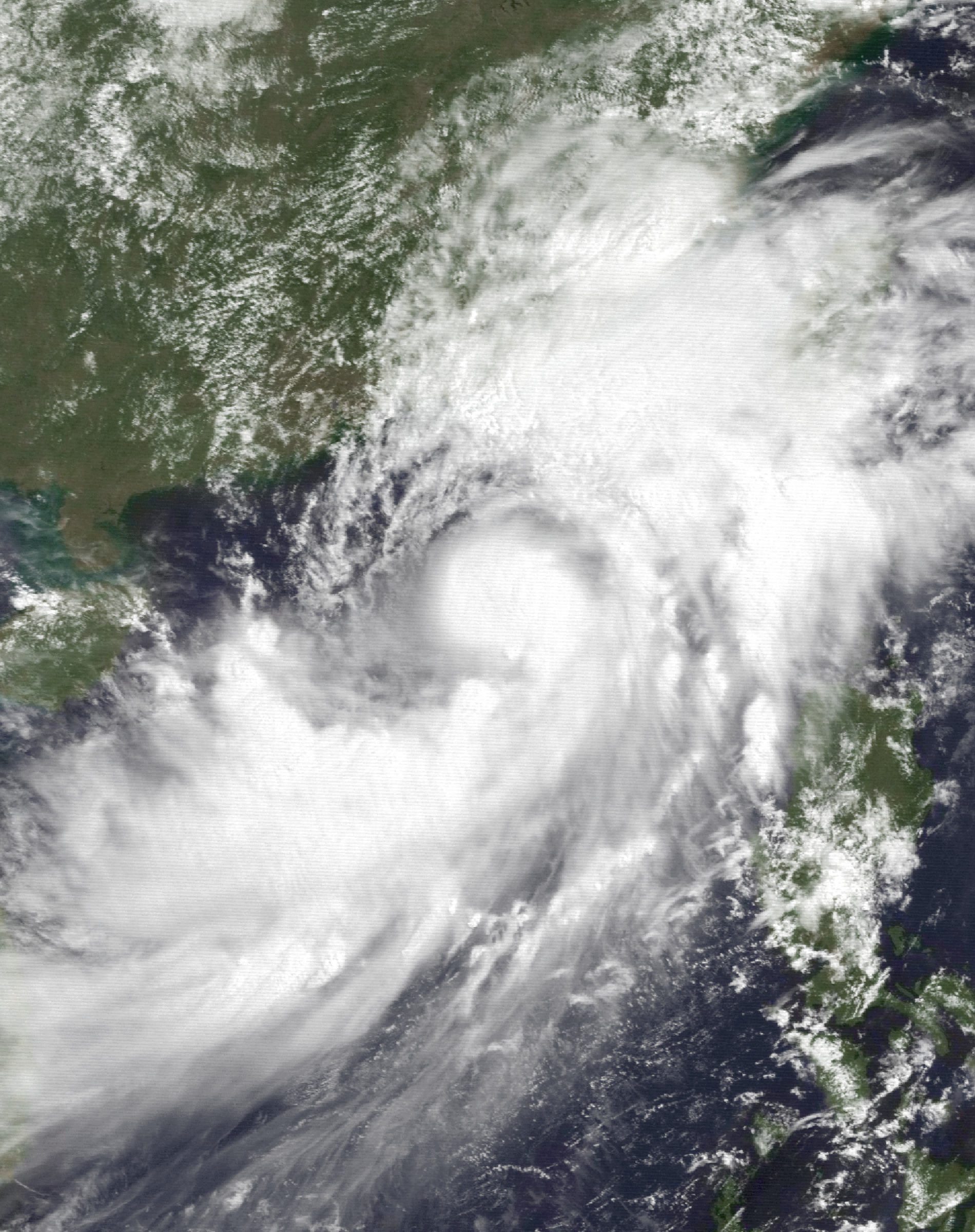
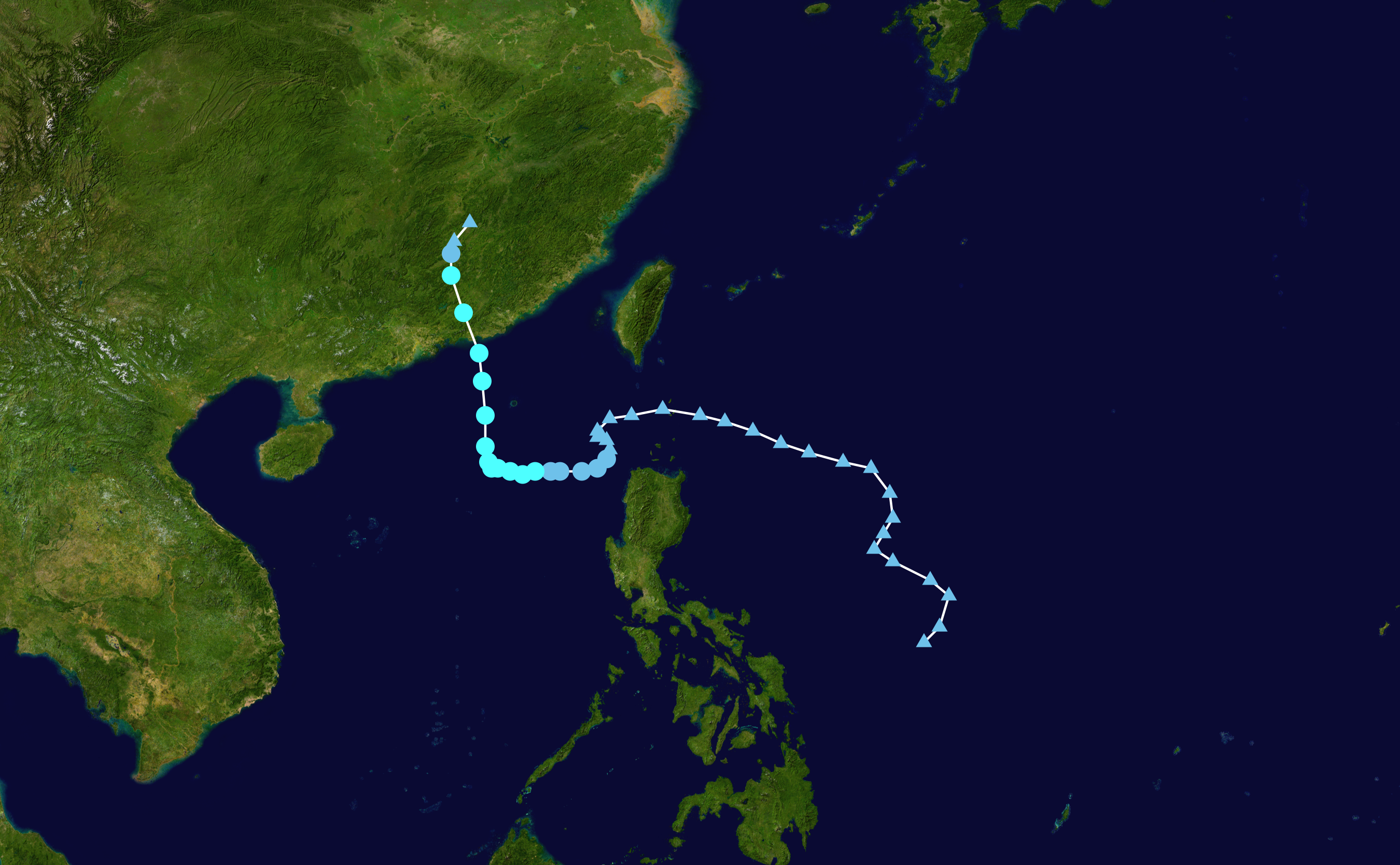
- Duration: July 21 – July 31
- Peak intensity: 100 km/h (65 mph) (10-min); 980 hPa (mbar)

65 mph Tropical Storm Tasha, which developed on July 21 and meandered through the South China Sea, hit southern China on the 30th, 75 miles east of Hong Kong. The storm caused torrential flooding in southern China, causing widespread damage and 108 fatalities. Tasha caused approximately 391 million RMB (US$71.2 million) in damage.

=== Typhoon Steve ===
- Very strong typhoon (JMA)
- Category 4 typhoon (SSHWS)
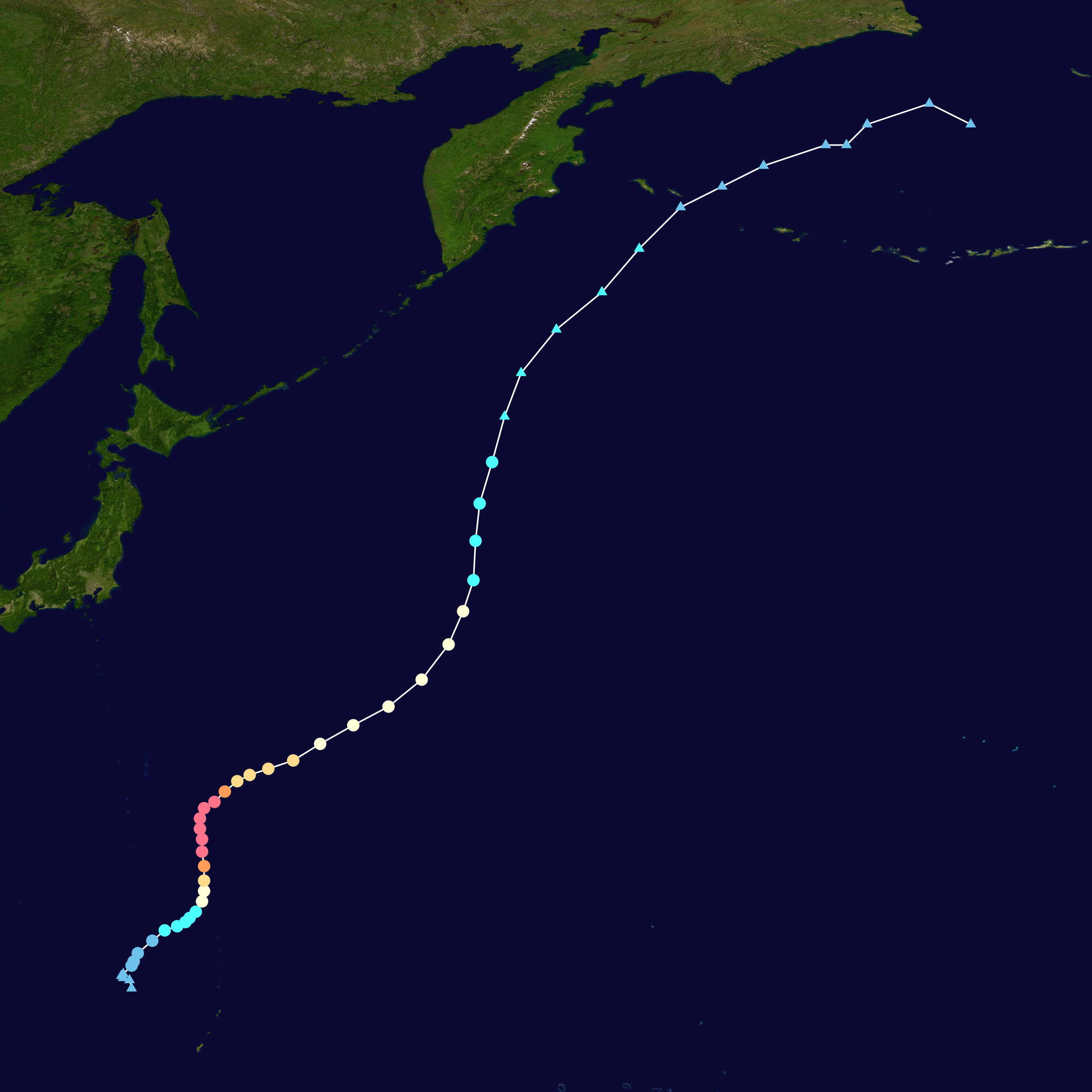
- Duration: July 23 – August 2
- Peak intensity: 155 km/h (100 mph) (10-min); 940 hPa (mbar)

Steve recurved out at sea.

=== Typhoon Vernon ===
- Typhoon (JMA)
- Category 2 typhoon (SSHWS)
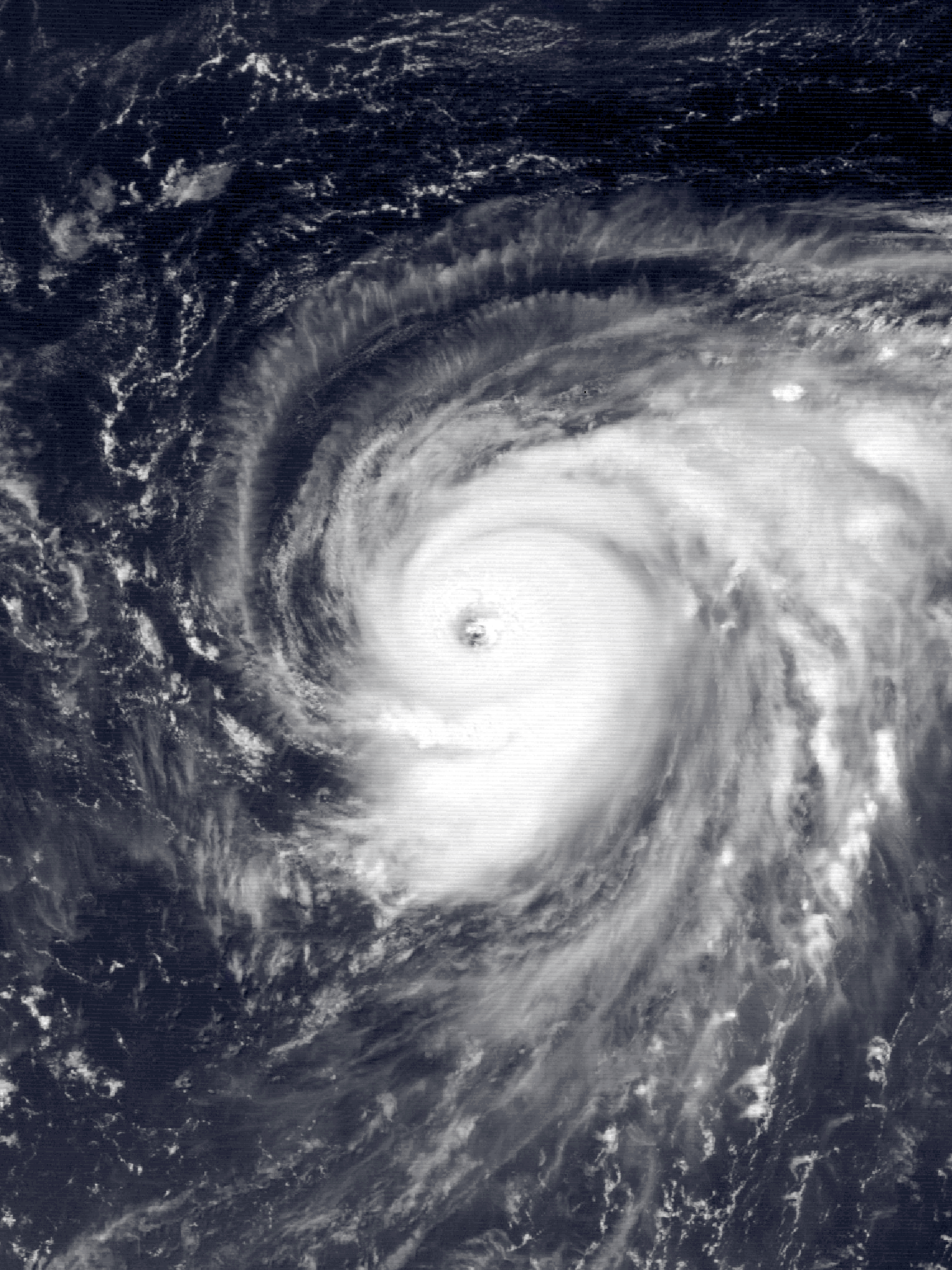
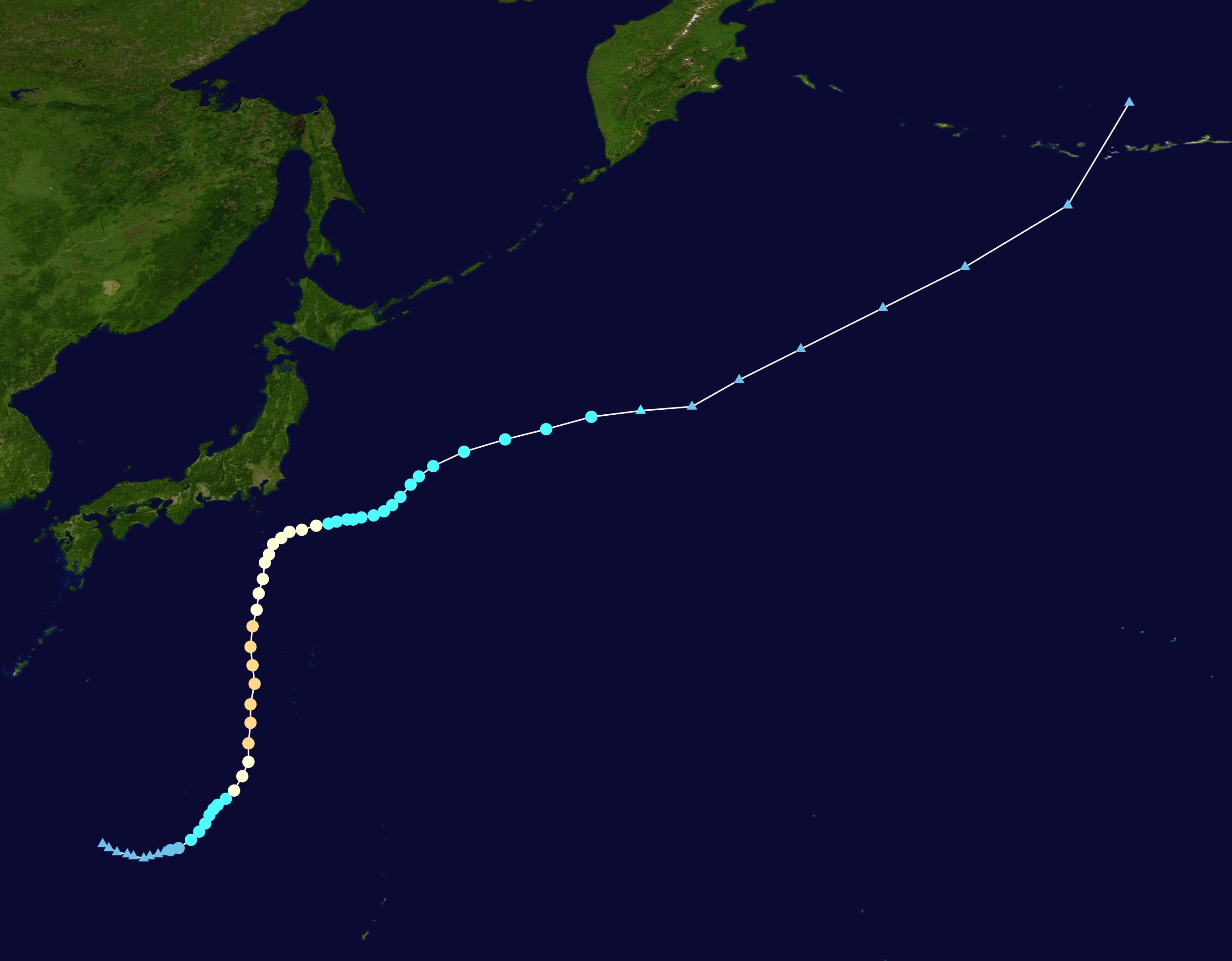
- Duration: July 26 – August 5
- Peak intensity: 140 km/h (85 mph) (10-min); 955 hPa (mbar)

Vernon followed Typhoon Steve's track.

=== Severe Tropical Storm Winona ===
- Severe tropical storm (JMA)
- Category 1 typhoon (SSHWS)
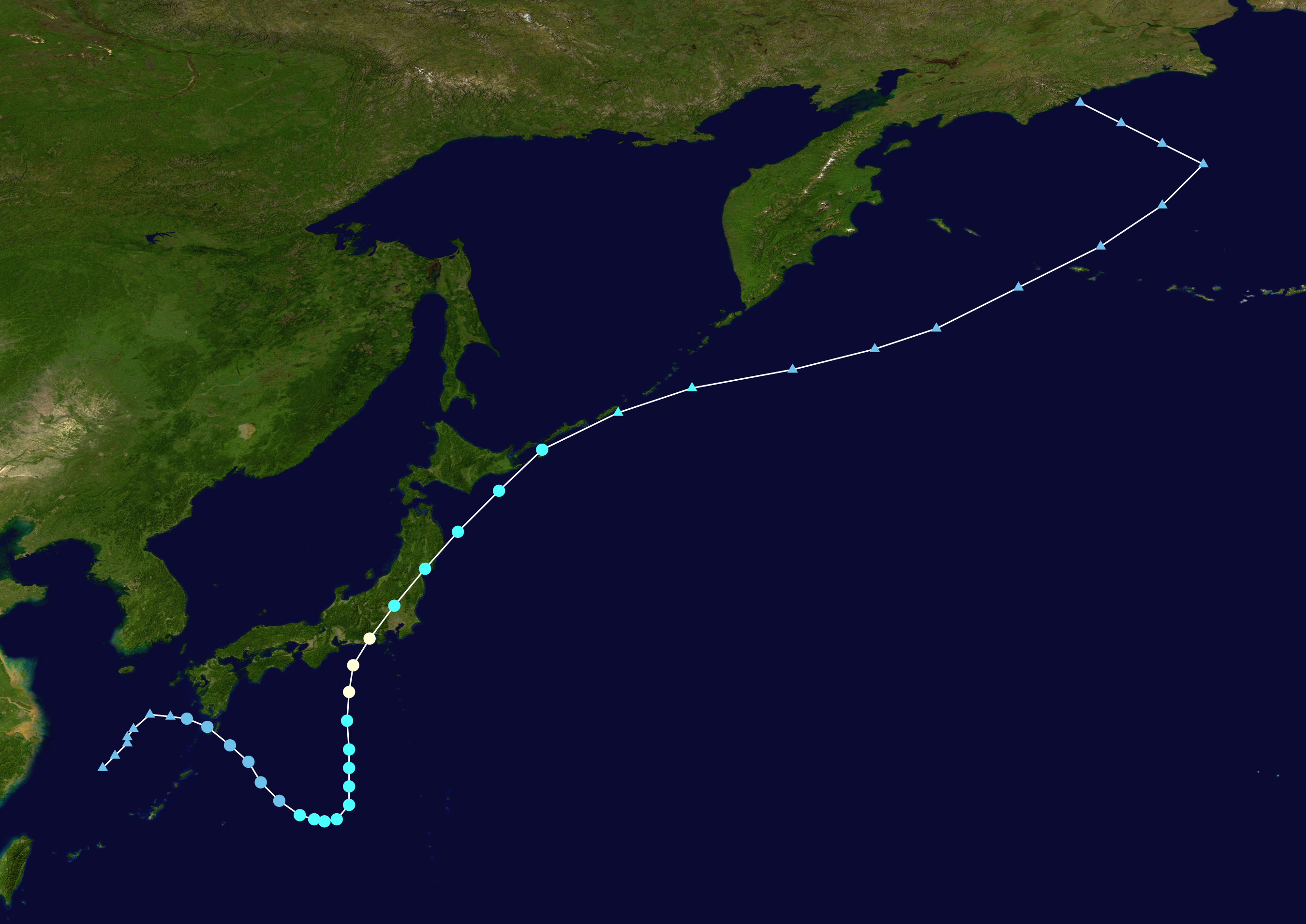
- Duration: August 4 – August 11
- Peak intensity: 110 km/h (70 mph) (10-min); 975 hPa (mbar)

The origins of Winona can be traced back to Severe Tropical Storm Tasha. On August 2, the remnant low of Tasha, as a patch of thunderstorms over northeastern China, was pushed to the east by a weather front from the west. By August 4, Tasha entered the Yellow Sea, before being pushed south by an anticyclone off northeastern Korea, into the East China Sea. Although the same system, Tasha was named Winona, as it started to strengthen into a tropical storm by August 7. It reached peak intensity with an eye-like feature on August 8, before landfalling over Japan the next day. Later, the remnants became extratropical.

=== Typhoon Yancy (Gading) ===
- Typhoon (JMA)
- Category 2 typhoon (SSHWS)
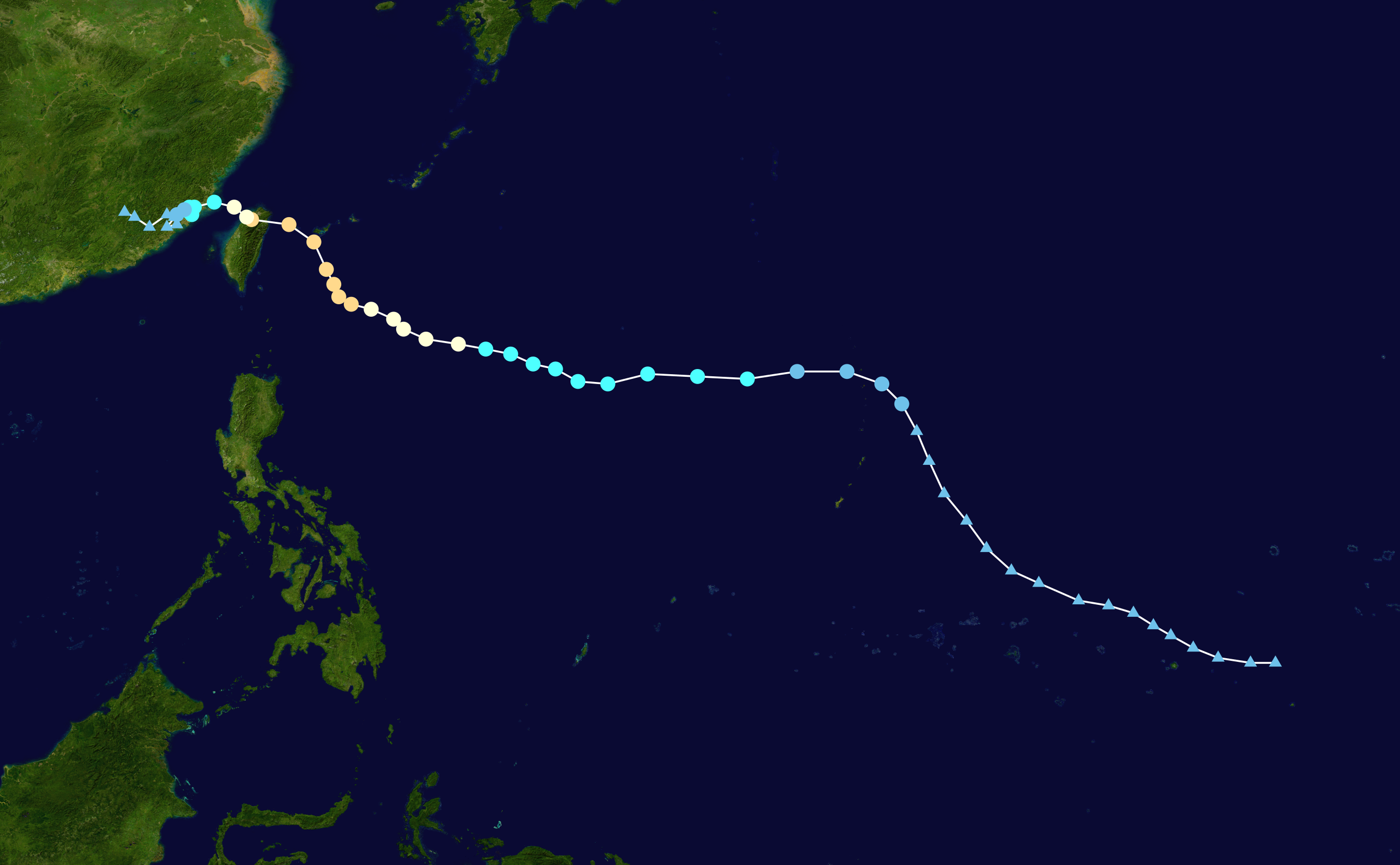
- Duration: August 11 – August 23
- Peak intensity: 150 km/h (90 mph) (10-min); 950 hPa (mbar)

Typhoon Yancy killed 12 people in the Philippines after a landslide destroyed a dormitory. In China, severe damage occurred and at least 216 people were killed. 20 people were killed in Taiwan.

=== Tropical Storm Aka ===
- Tropical storm (JMA)
- Tropical storm (SSHWS)
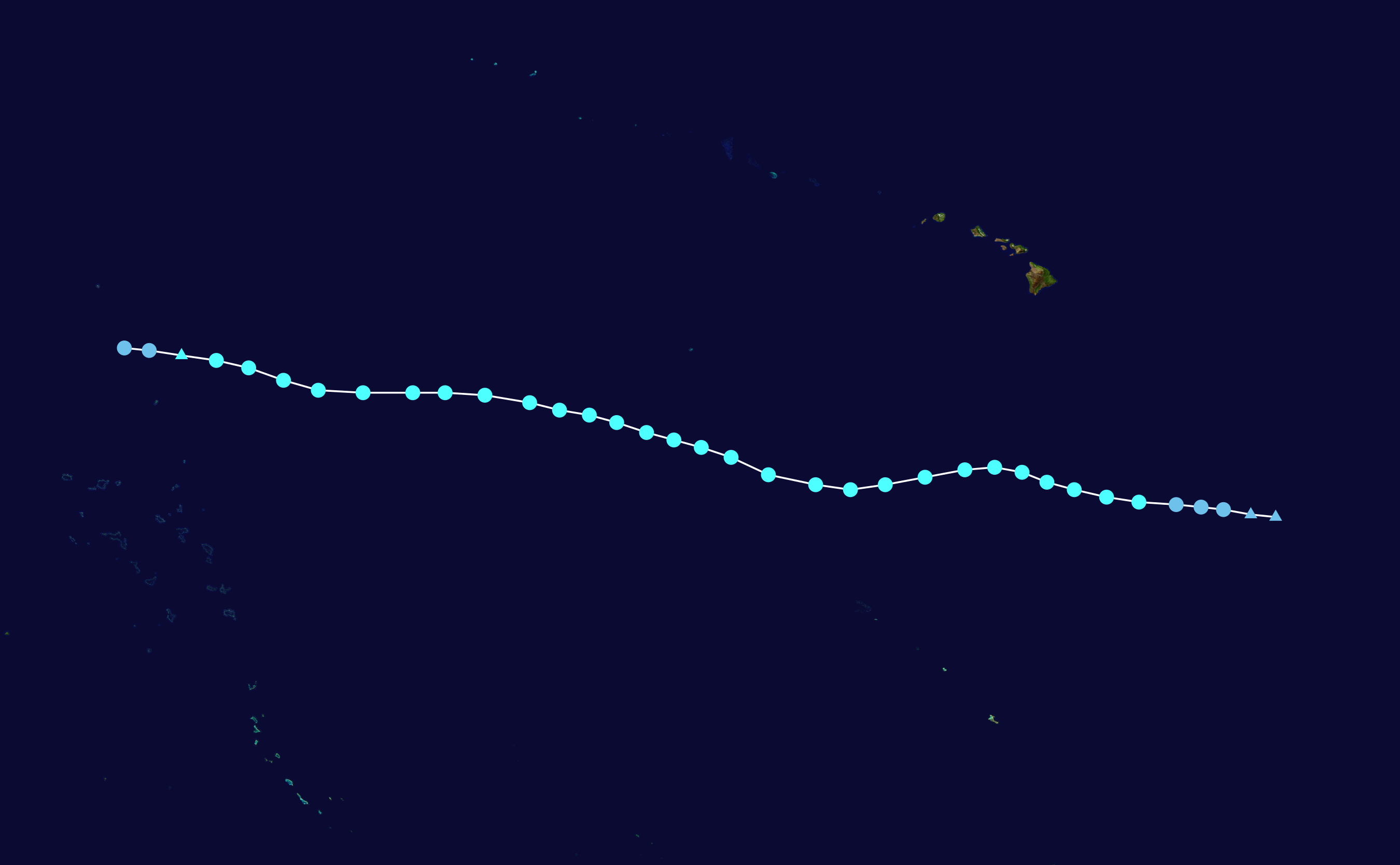
- Duration: August 13 (Entered basin) – August 15
- Peak intensity: 75 km/h (45 mph) (10-min); 994 hPa (mbar)

On 15:00 UTC on August 13, a weakening Tropical Storm Aka crossed into the basin from the Central Pacific, resulting in the Central Pacific Hurricane Center (CPHC) passing its responsibility to the Joint Typhoon Warning Center (JTWC). The next day, the JTWC downgraded Aka into a tropical depression since it had lost convection due to persistent wind shear caused by a nearby TUTT. On 12:00 UTC on August 15, the JTWC issued the last warning on the system, as it passed south of Wake Island.

=== Typhoon Zola ===
- Typhoon (JMA)
- Category 3 typhoon (SSHWS)
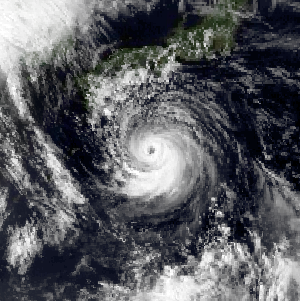
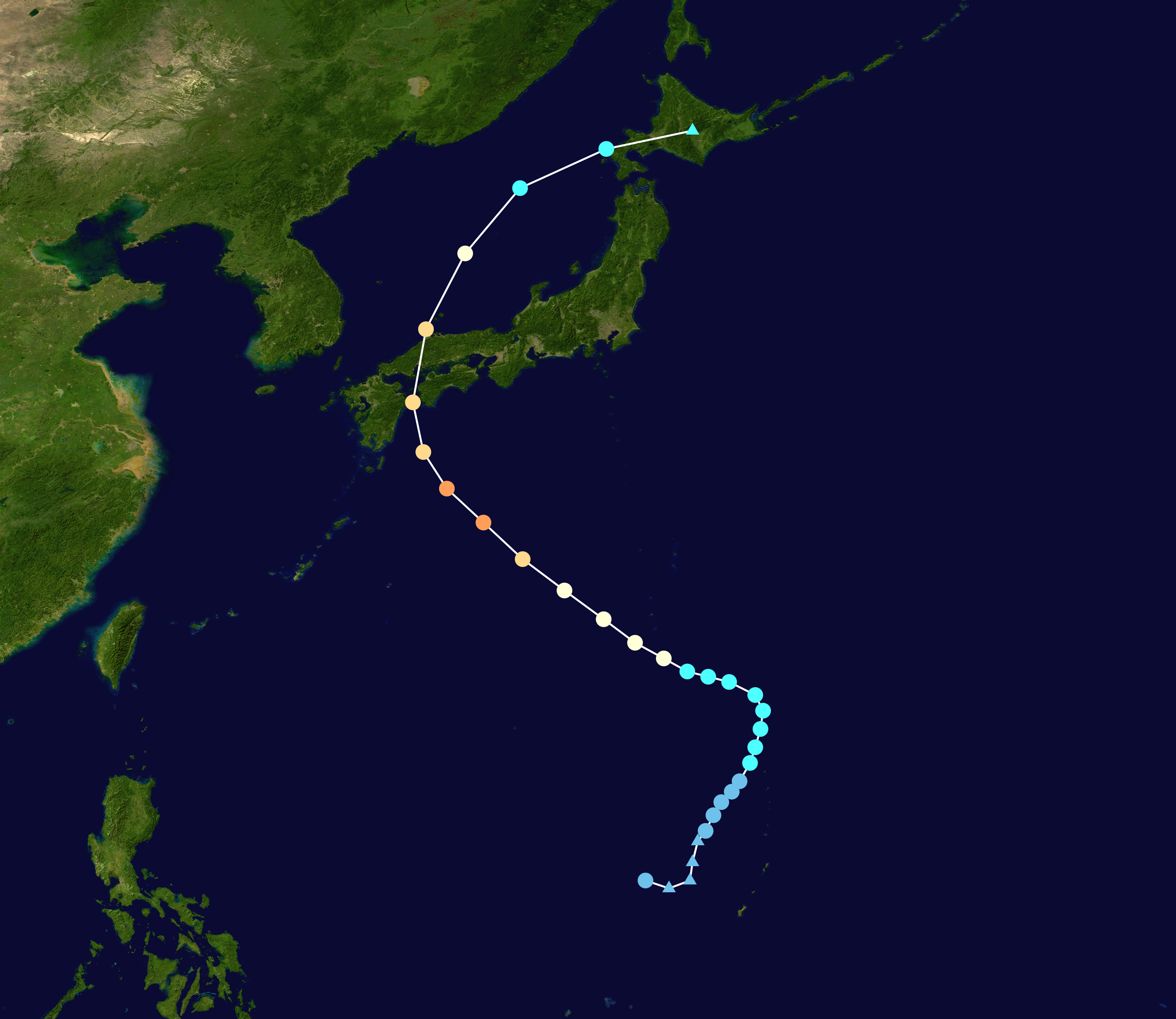
- Duration: August 15 – August 25
- Peak intensity: 140 km/h (85 mph) (10-min); 960 hPa (mbar)

On August 15, a large area of convection associated with the inflow of developing Typhoon Yancy was cut off, as Yancy was moving too fast to the west for the convection in the east to be absorbed into Yancy. By August 16, the convection developed a mid to low level circulation, and developed into tropical storm by August 18. Zola intensified into a typhoon by the next day, before reaching peak intensity on August 21. By the next day, Zola made landfall over Japan, before dissipating north of Japan. High winds and heavy rains produced by the storm killed six people and injured 22 others in Japan.

=== Typhoon Abe (Iliang) ===
- Typhoon (JMA)
- Category 2 typhoon (SSHWS)
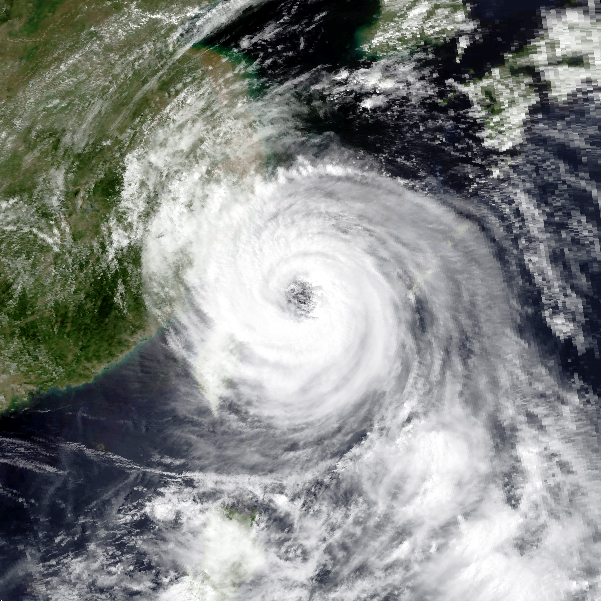
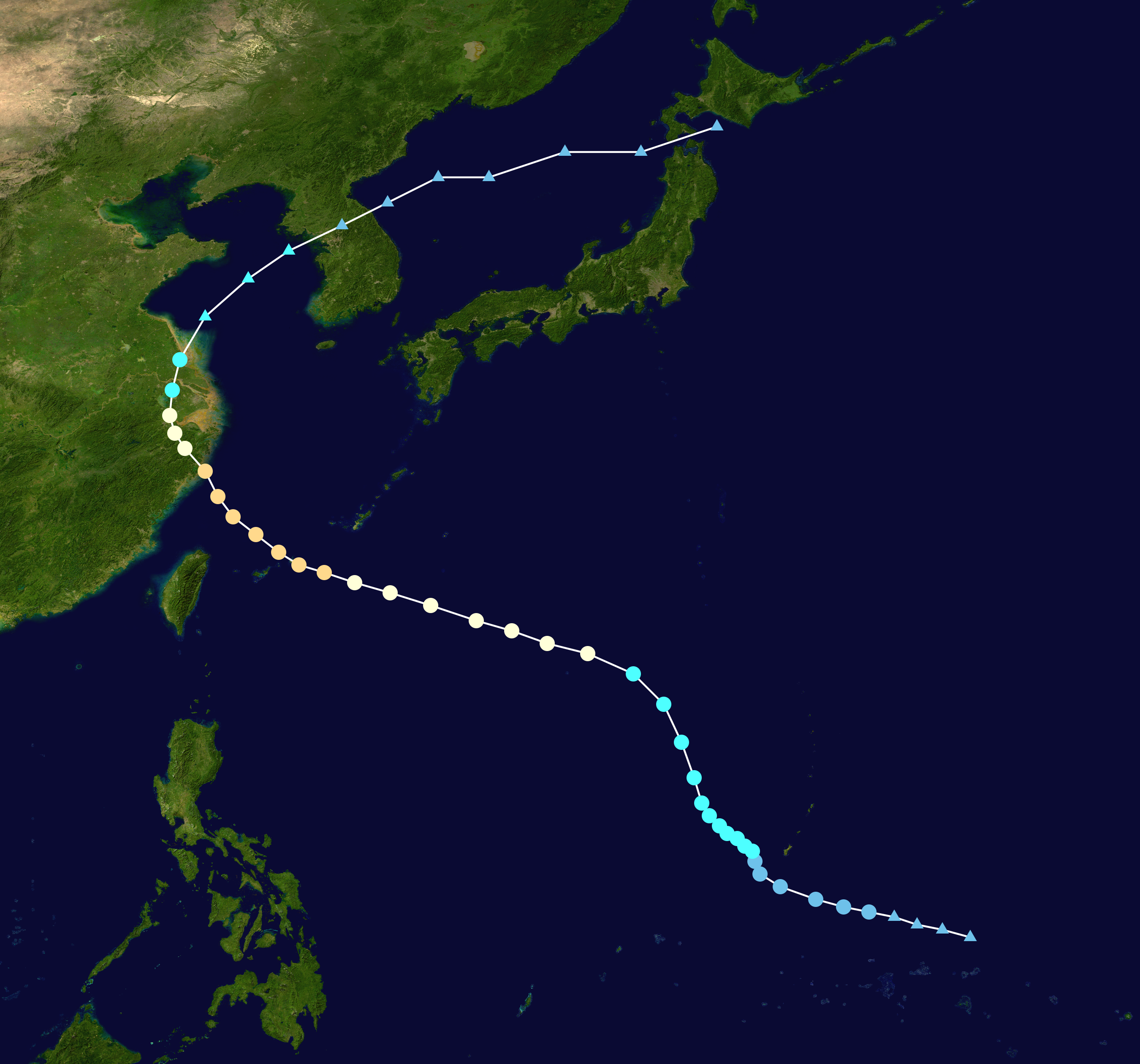
- Duration: August 23 – September 2
- Peak intensity: 140 km/h (85 mph) (10-min); 955 hPa (mbar)

Forming on August 23 from a tropical disturbance, the depression which would eventually develop into Typhoon Abe initially tracked in a steady west-northwestward direction. As a result of an intense monsoon surge, the system's trajectory briefly changed to an eastward then northward path before returning to its original track. Abe only intensified by a small amount between 0000 UTC August 24 and 0600 UTC August 27 due to the disruptive effects of the surge, and on August 30, Abe peaked in intensity as a Category 2-equivalent typhoon on the Saffir–Simpson hurricane wind scale. After peaking in intensity, Abe crossed the Ryukyu Islands and the East China Sea, making landfall in China where it affected the provinces of Zhejiang and Jiangsu before entering the Yellow Sea, crossing South Korea, and finally transitioning into an extratropical cyclone.

Typhoon Abe killed 108–195 people after it caused flooding and landslides in the Philippines and Taiwan, ravaged coastal areas of China, and brought high waves to Japan. Abe, which is responsible for killing 108 in China, affected half of Zhejiang's land area and a fourth of its population, leaving thousands homeless and causing ¥3.5 billion yuan (RMB, $741.5–743 million USD) to be lost in damages. Additional damage and one fatality occurred in Okinawa Prefecture in Japan, where at least ¥890 million yen (JPY, US$6 million) in damage was caused.

=== Typhoon Becky (Heling) ===
- Typhoon (JMA)
- Category 1 typhoon (SSHWS)
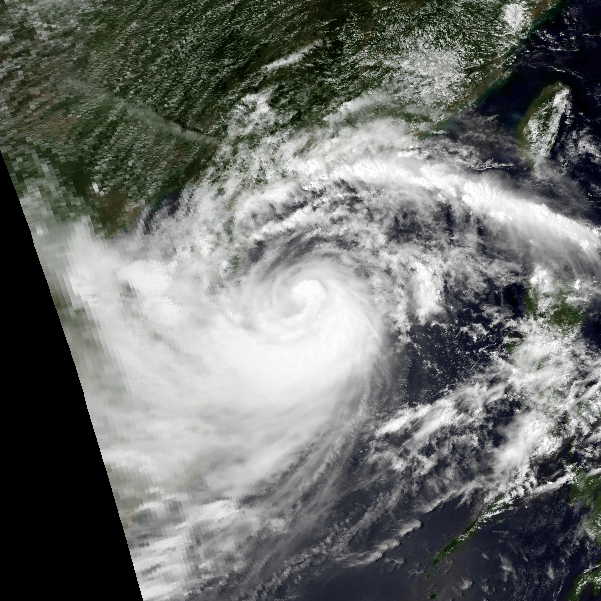
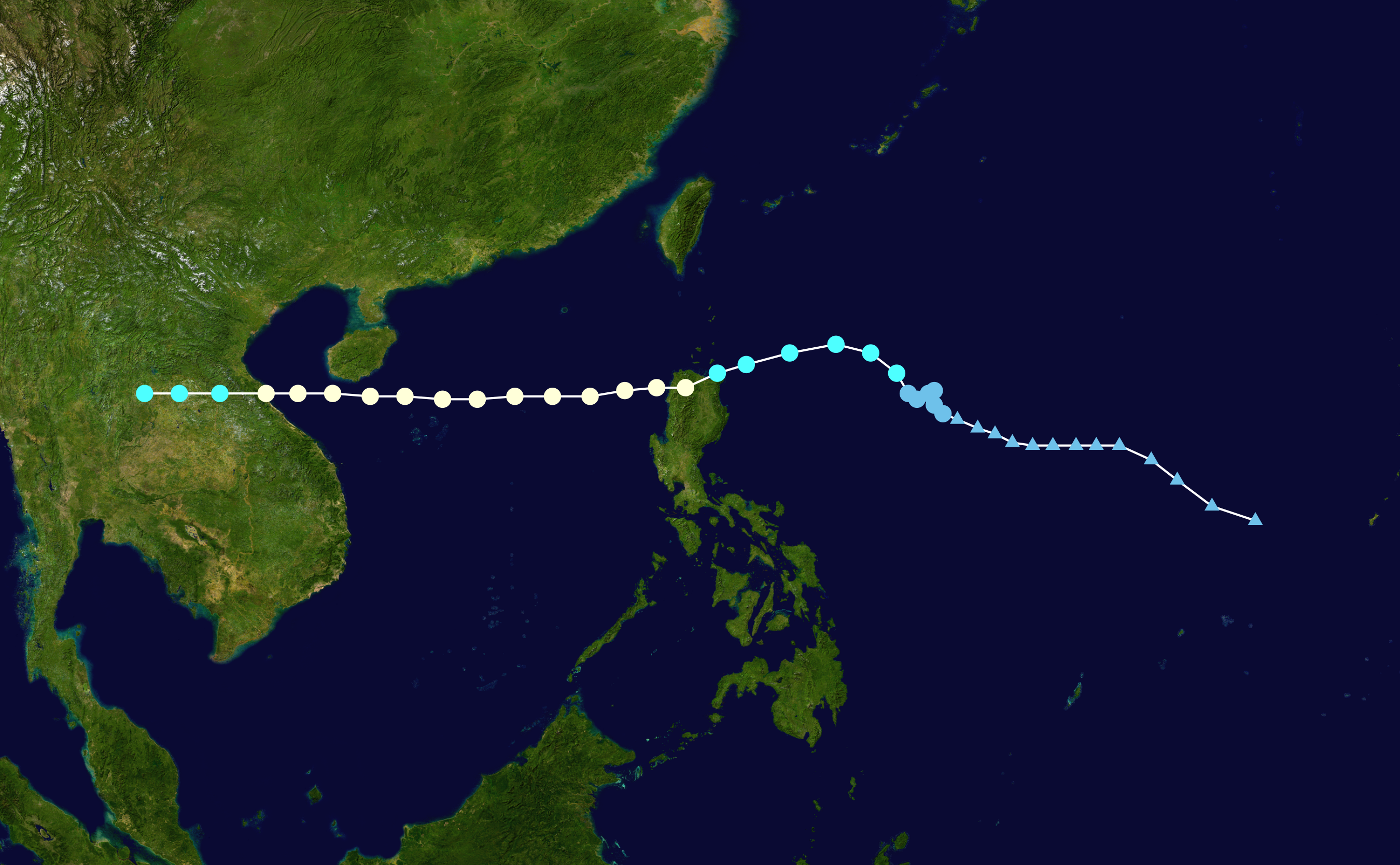
- Duration: August 23 – September 1
- Peak intensity: 130 km/h (80 mph) (10-min); 965 hPa (mbar)

Tropical Storm Becky, having developed on August 20, hit northern Luzon on the 26th as a strong tropical storm. It strengthened over the South China Sea to an 80 mph typhoon, and hit northern Vietnam at that intensity on the 29th. The lowest station pressure measured at a weather station in Ba Đồn on August 29 was 987.0 hPa. Becky was responsible for killing 32 people and causing heavy flooding.

=== Tropical Depression Cecil ===
- Tropical depression (JMA)
- Tropical storm (SSHWS)
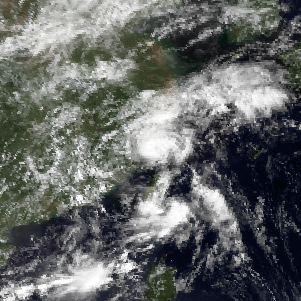
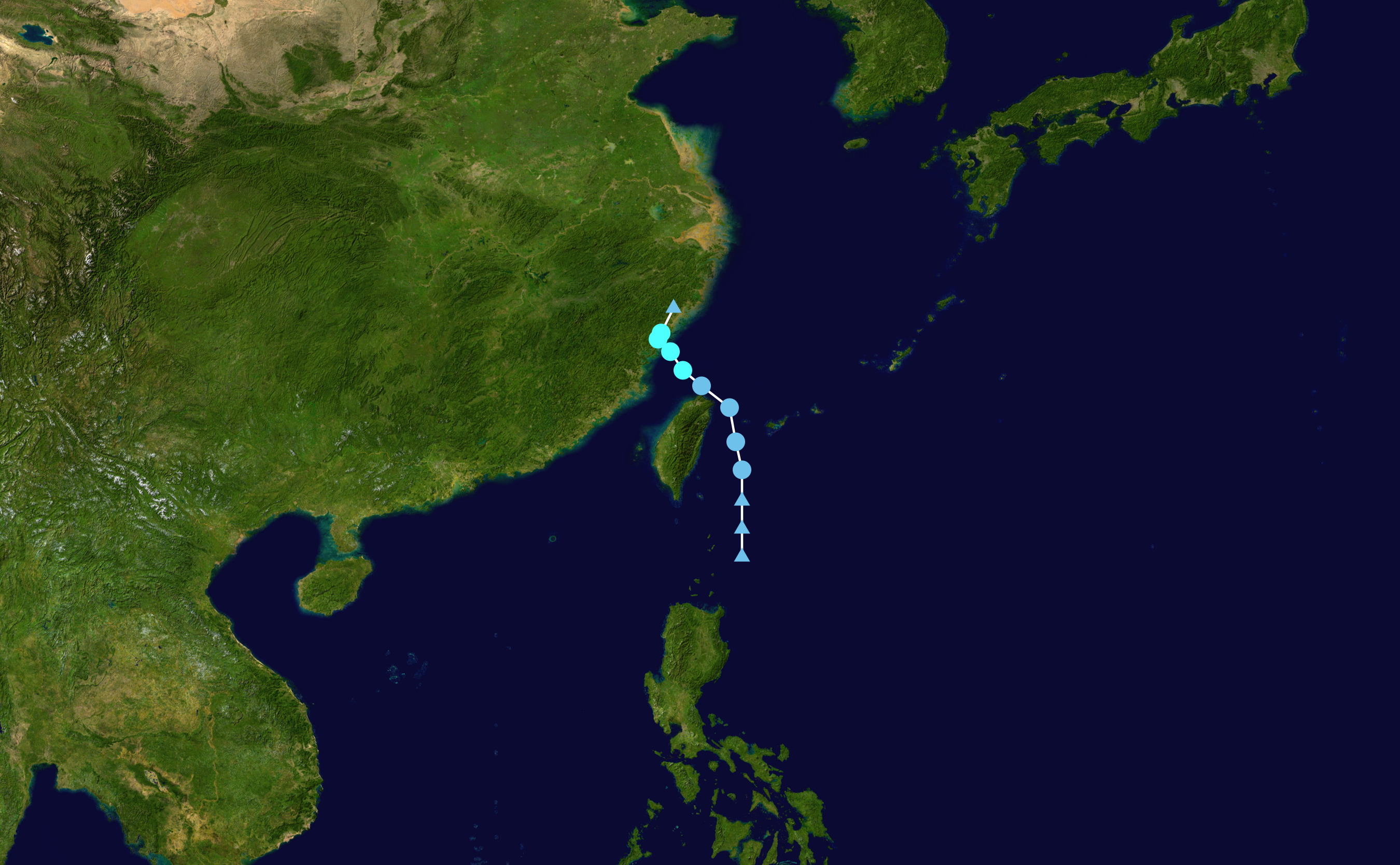
- Duration: September 2 – September 4
- Peak intensity: 85 km/h (50 mph) (1-min); 1002 hPa (mbar)

Cecil hit China. Despite being weak, Cecil caused intense flooding. Numerous homes were inundated and landslides were reported. 42 people were killed.

=== Typhoon Dot (Loleng) ===
- Typhoon (JMA)
- Category 1 typhoon (SSHWS)
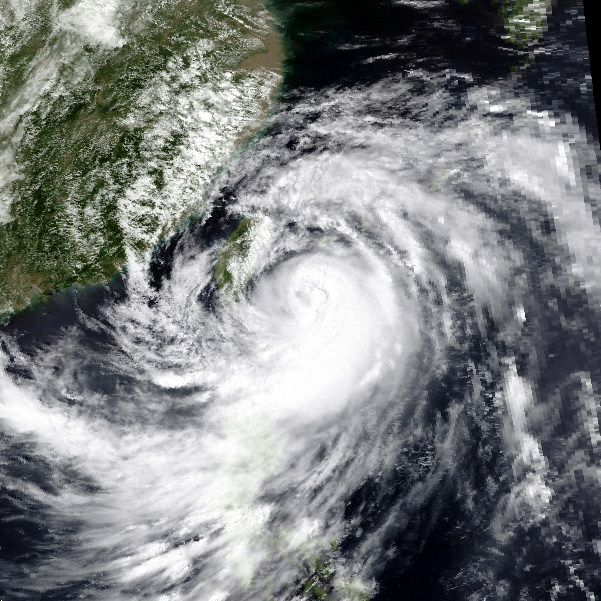
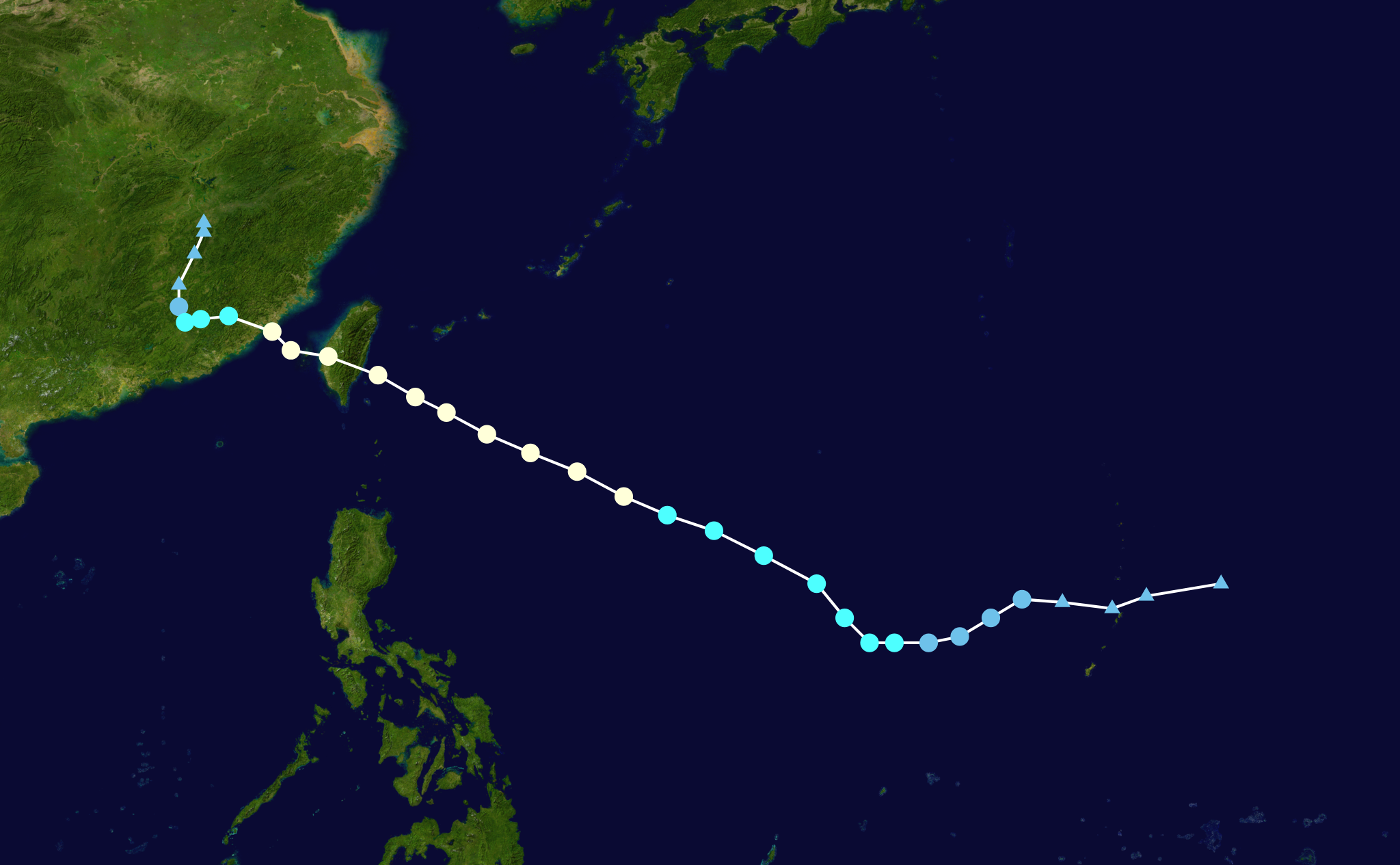
- Duration: September 3 – September 11
- Peak intensity: 140 km/h (85 mph) (10-min); 960 hPa (mbar)

Typhoon Dot formed from a monsoon trough to the southwest of Guam. Dot moved steadily towards the northwest and strengthened into a typhoon. Typhoon Dot reached peak intensity of 85 mph before weakening slight before landfall on eastern Taiwan on 7 September. After passing Taiwan Dot regained typhoon intensity in the Formosa Strait before making a final landfall in Fujian Province, China. On northern Luzon Island rains from Typhoon Dot caused floods killing 4 people, on Taiwan 7 people died. Losses in Taiwan reached NT$730 million (US$27.1 million). Dot caused heavy flooding in China. 74 people were killed and losses reached 1.02 billion RMB (US$216 million).

=== Typhoon Ed (Miding) ===
- Typhoon (JMA)
- Category 2 typhoon (SSHWS)
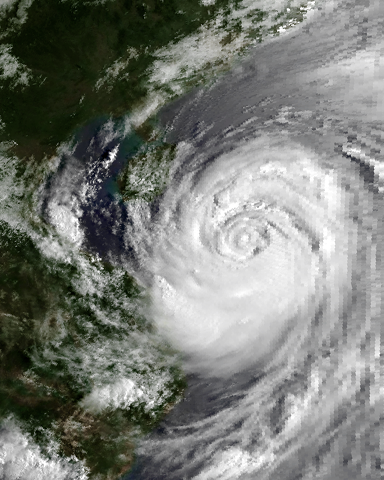
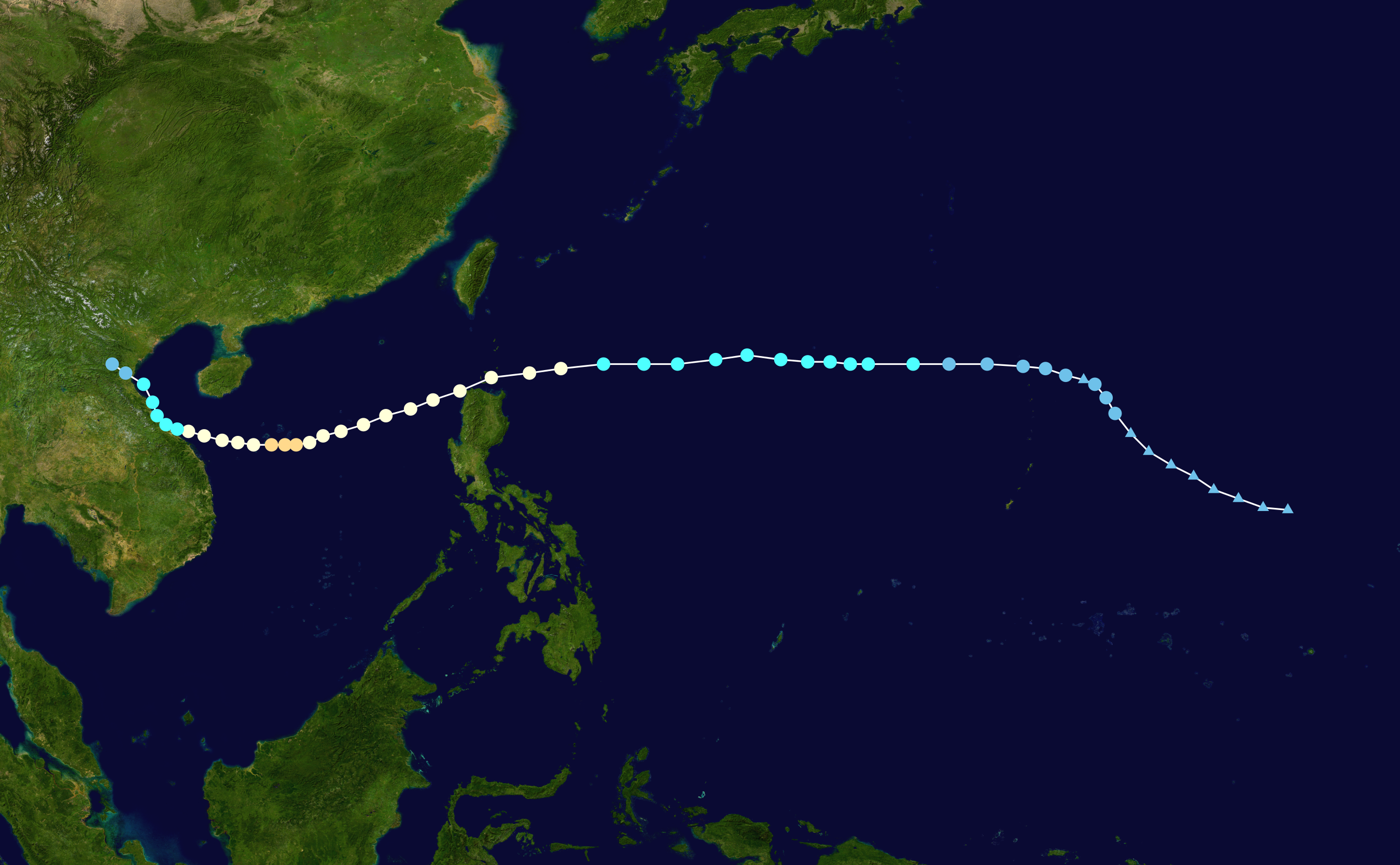
- Duration: September 9 – September 20
- Peak intensity: 130 km/h (80 mph) (10-min); 965 hPa (mbar)

Severe flooding produced by the storm killed at least 18 people in Vietnam. At least 4,500 homes were destroyed and another 140,000 were inundated.

=== Typhoon Flo (Norming) ===
- Violent typhoon (JMA)
- Category 5 super typhoon (SSHWS)
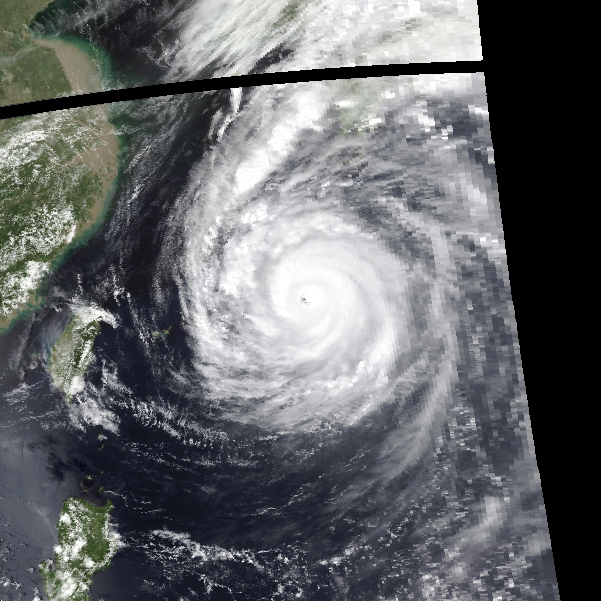
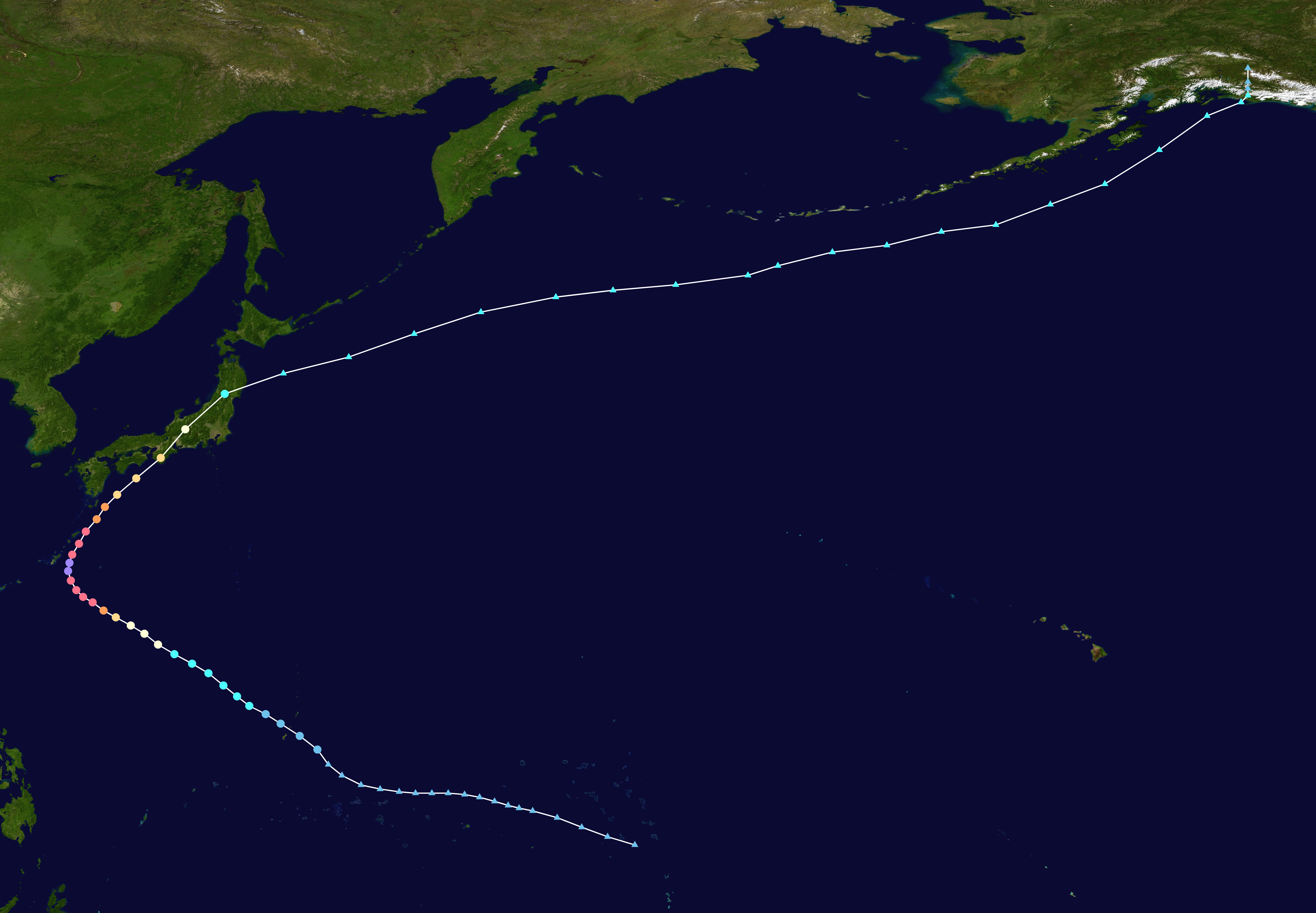
- Duration: September 12 – September 23
- Peak intensity: 220 km/h (140 mph) (10-min); 890 hPa (mbar)

Typhoon Flo, which developed on September 12, rapidly intensified on the 16th and 17th to a 165 mph super typhoon near Okinawa. Vertical shear weakened it as it recurved to the northeast, and Flo hit Honshū, Japan, on the 19th as a 100 mph typhoon. It continued rapidly northeastward, became extratropical on the 20th, and dissipated on the 22nd. Widespread flooding and landslides killed 32 and caused millions in damage.

=== Typhoon Gene (Oyang) ===
- Typhoon (JMA)
- Category 1 typhoon (SSHWS)
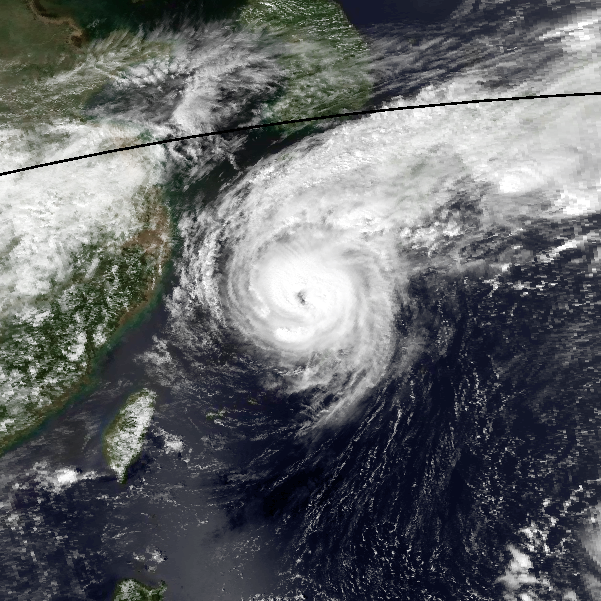
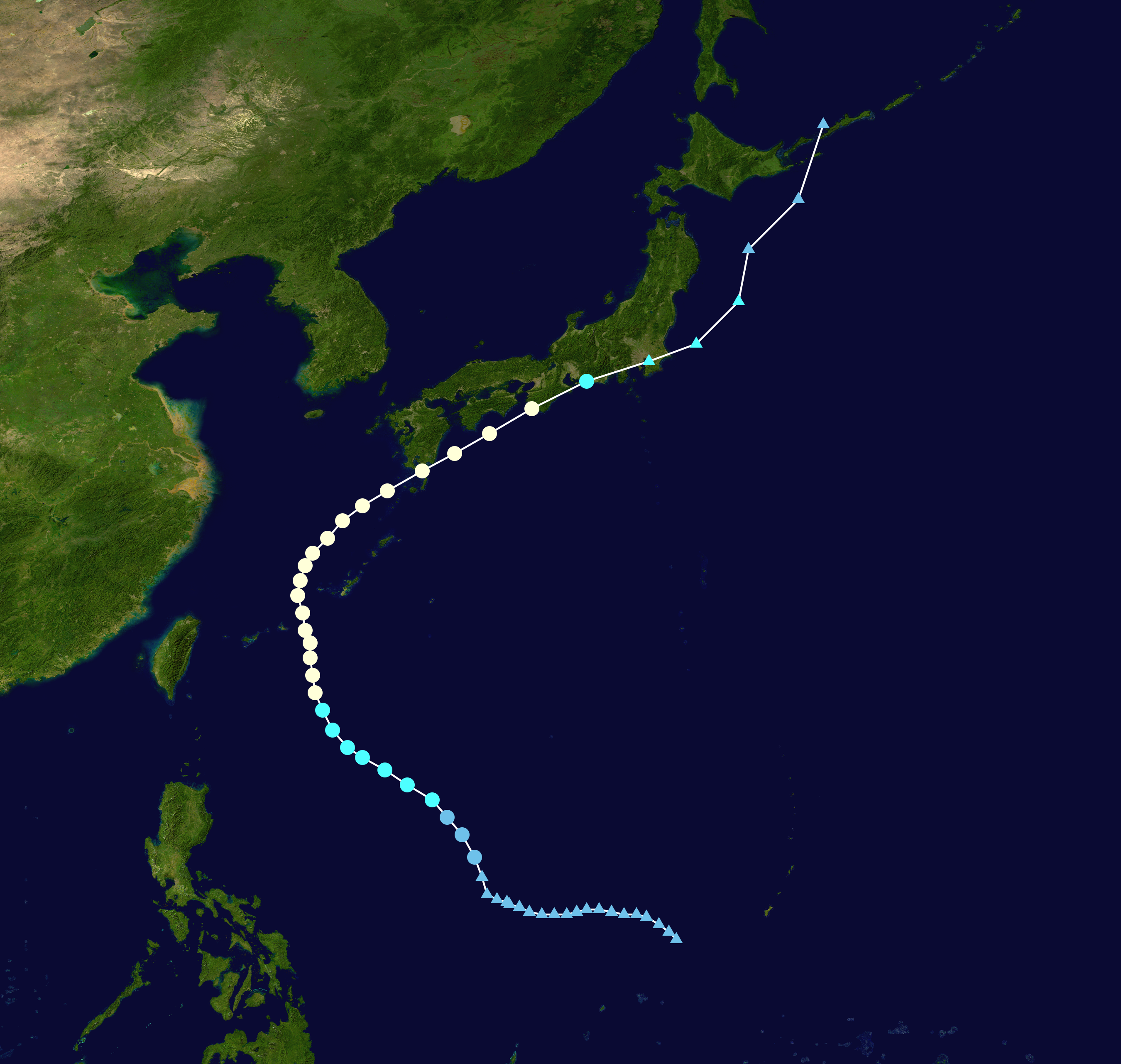
- Duration: September 22 – September 29
- Peak intensity: 150 km/h (90 mph) (10-min); 950 hPa (mbar)

A tropical disturbance consolidated into a tropical depression on the 23rd of September to the east of the Philippines. Tropical Storm Gene was named as the storm moved towards the northwest and strengthened into a typhoon the next day. Typhoon Gene reached peak intensity of 95 mph on the 27th shortly before recurving towards the northeast. Gene then skimmed the coasts of Kyūshū, Shikoku and Honshū Islands in Japan before moving out to sea and turning extratropical. Winds on 85 mph were recorded on Kyūshū and heavy rains fell across the region, resulting floods and landslides killed 4 people.

=== Typhoon Hattie (Pasing) ===
- Typhoon (JMA)
- Category 2 typhoon (SSHWS)
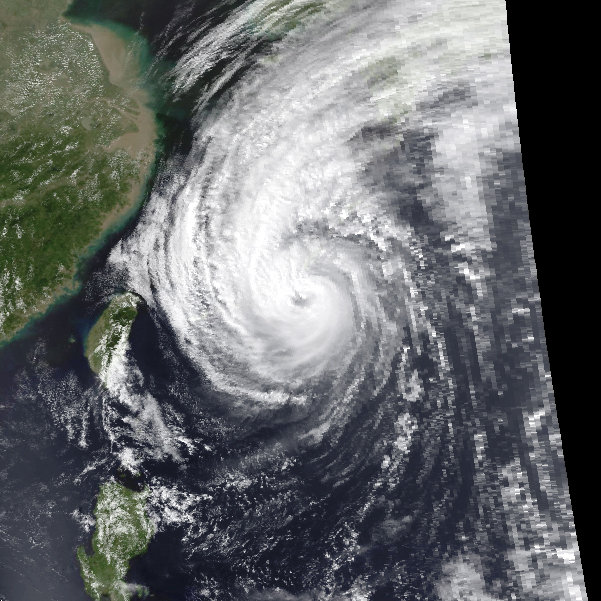
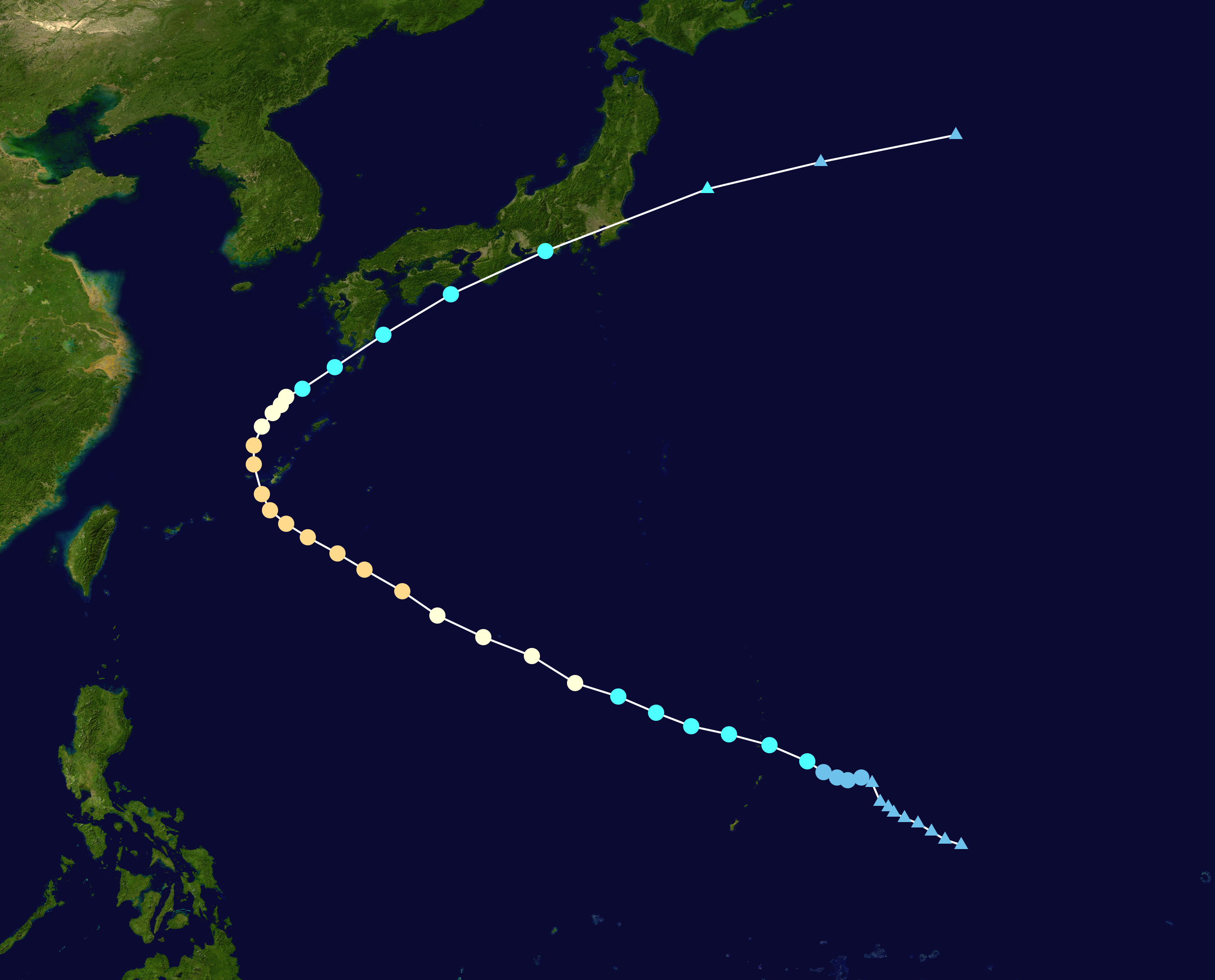
- Duration: September 30 – October 8
- Peak intensity: 150 km/h (90 mph) (10-min); 950 hPa (mbar)

Typhoon Hattie formed as Typhoon Gene was accelerating towards Japan. Hattie strengthened into a typhoon on 3 October while moving towards the northwest and reached a peak intensity of 105 mph the next day. Typhoon Hattie began to recurve while west of the island of Okinawa. Heavy rains from Typhoons Flo, Gene and Hattie broke the drought that plagued the island. As Hattie accelerated towards Japan it was downgraded to a tropical storm before brushing pass Kyūshū and Shikoku before making landfall on Honshū Island. Heavy rains caused a landslide on Shikoku Island killing three people when a landslide hit a bus.

=== Tropical Storm Ira ===
- Tropical storm (JMA)
- Tropical storm (SSHWS)
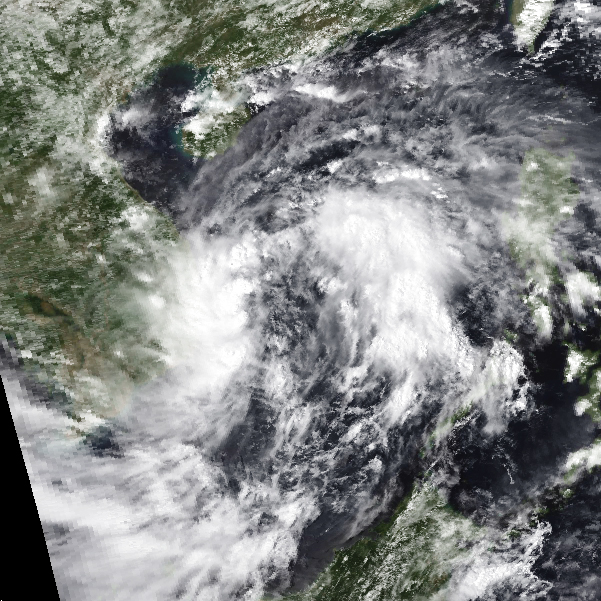
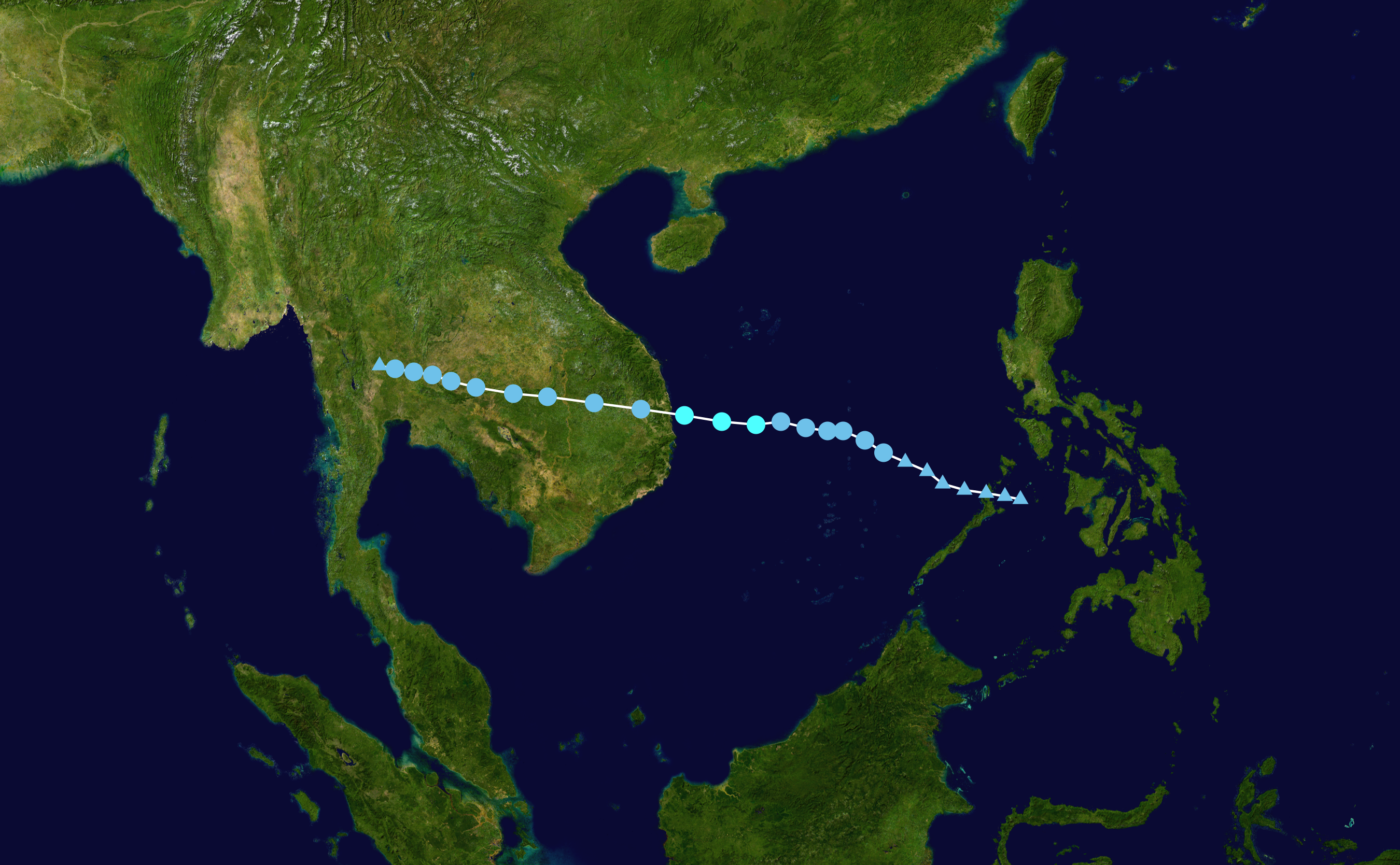
- Duration: October 1 – October 5
- Peak intensity: 65 km/h (40 mph) (10-min); 996 hPa (mbar)

Severe flooding in Thailand triggered by heavy rains from Ira killed at least 24 people.

=== Tropical Depression Jeana ===
- Tropical depression (JMA)
- Tropical storm (SSHWS)
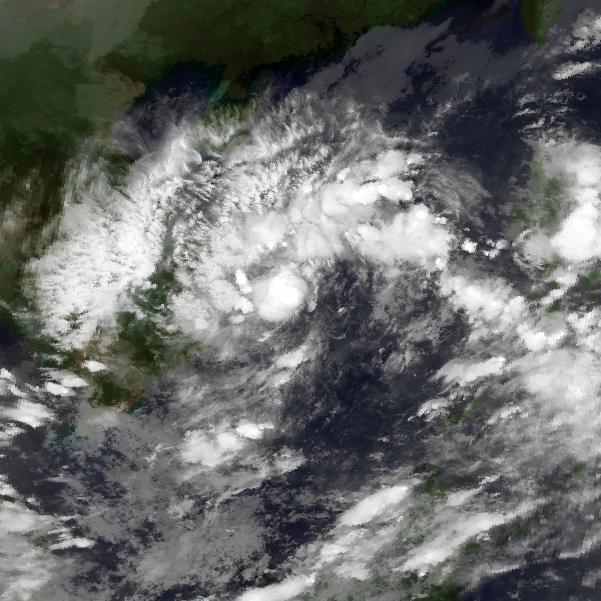
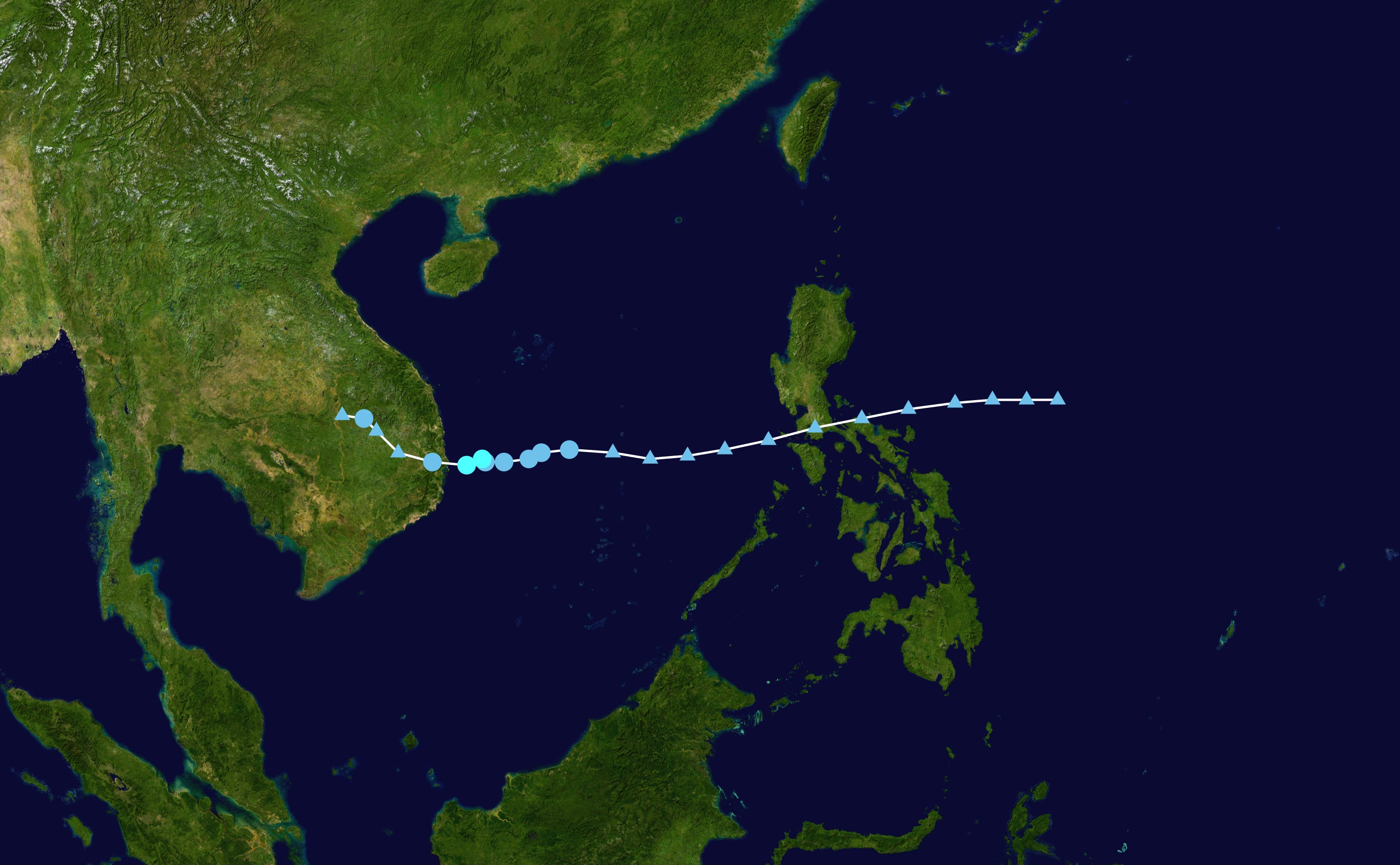
- Duration: October 12 – October 14
- Peak intensity: 65 km/h (40 mph) (1-min); 1004 hPa (mbar)

Jeana hit southeast Asia.

=== Typhoon Kyle ===
- Typhoon (JMA)
- Category 2 typhoon (SSHWS)
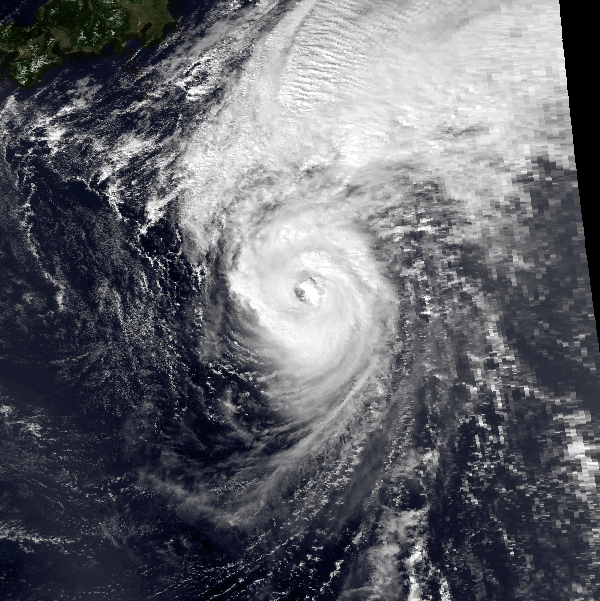
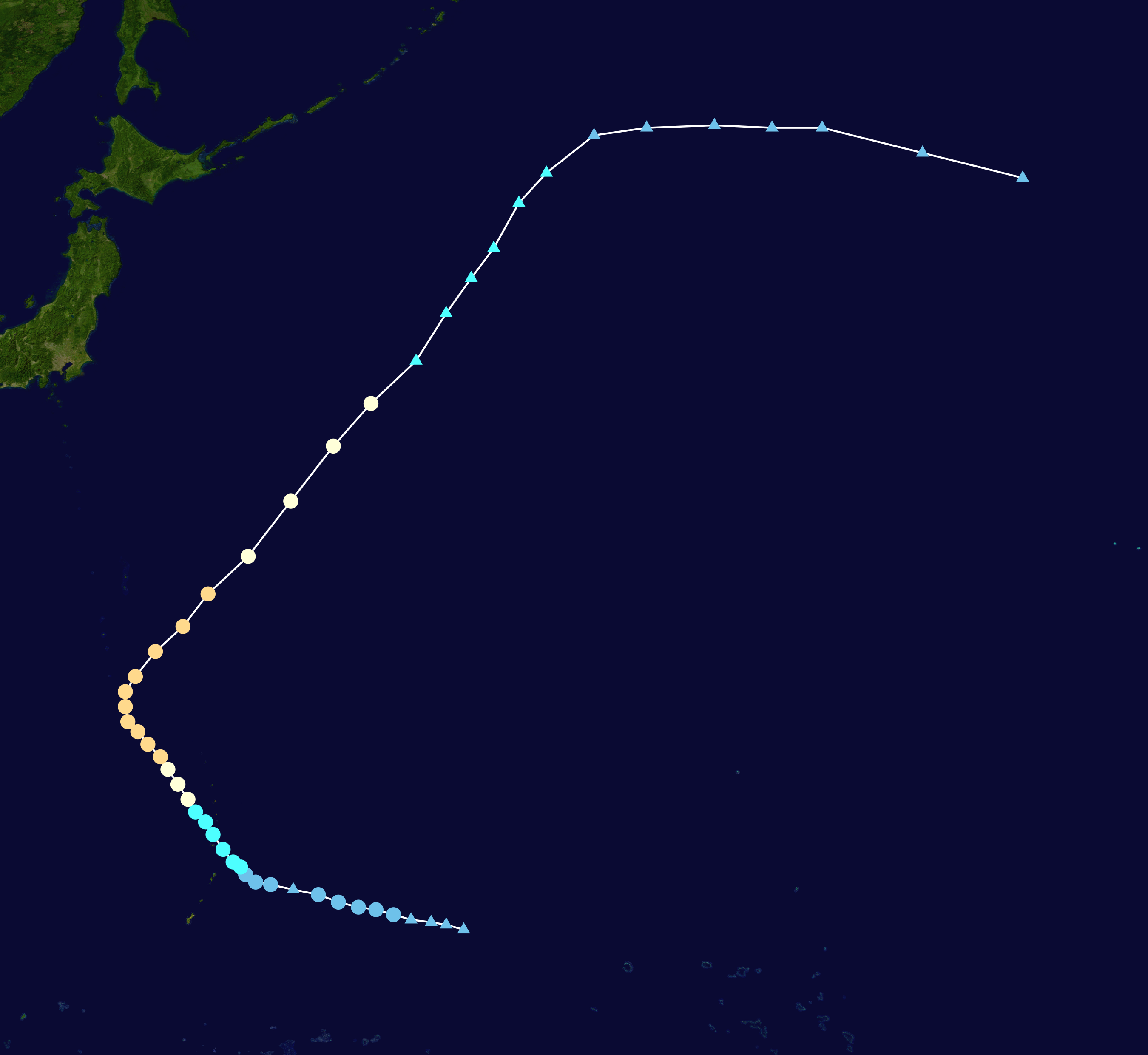
- Duration: October 14 – October 22
- Peak intensity: 140 km/h (85 mph) (10-min); 955 hPa (mbar)

A category 2 typhoon which did not impact land directly. It formed on October 14 and was classified as a Tropical Depression. It became a tropical storm and a typhoon later. Kyle reached a peak intensity of a Category 2 typhoon on September 20. Then, the storm turned eastward instead of affecting Japan. It stated to weaken and was classified as a tropical storm and eventually dissipated on the 22nd. Kyle did not cause any deaths or damages.

=== Tropical Storm Lola ===
- Tropical storm (JMA)
- Tropical storm (SSHWS)
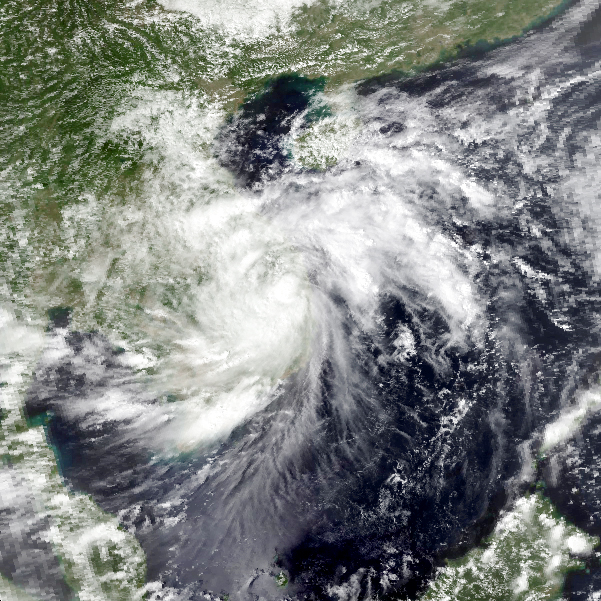
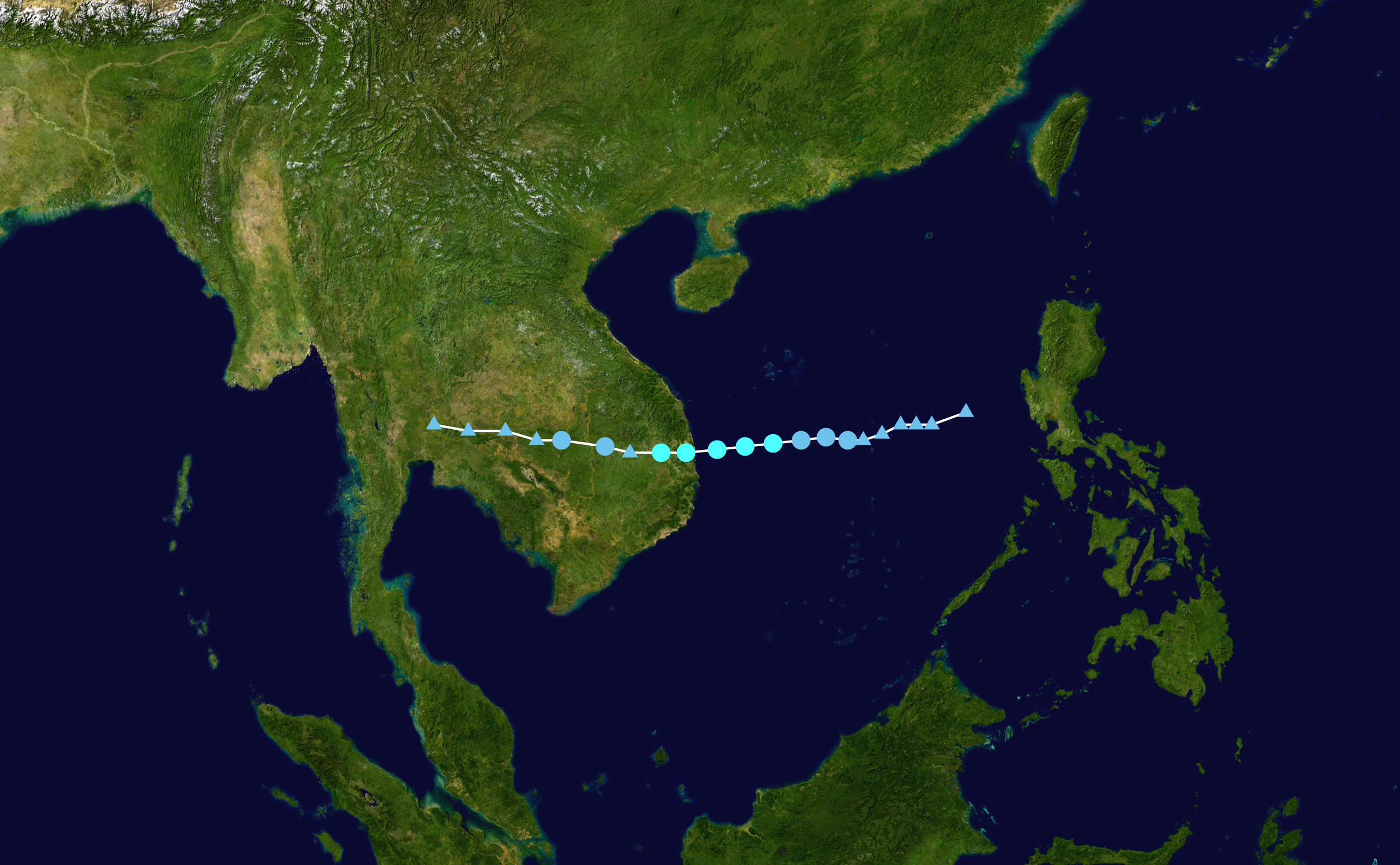
- Duration: October 16 – October 20
- Peak intensity: 65 km/h (40 mph) (10-min); 998 hPa (mbar)

Extreme rainfall, peaking near 31.5 in (800 mm) triggered extensive flooding that left some regions under 6 ft (1.8 m) of water. Economic losses reached US$2.1 million. 23 people were killed by the storm.

=== Typhoon Mike (Ruping) ===
- Very strong typhoon (JMA)
- Category 5 super typhoon (SSHWS)
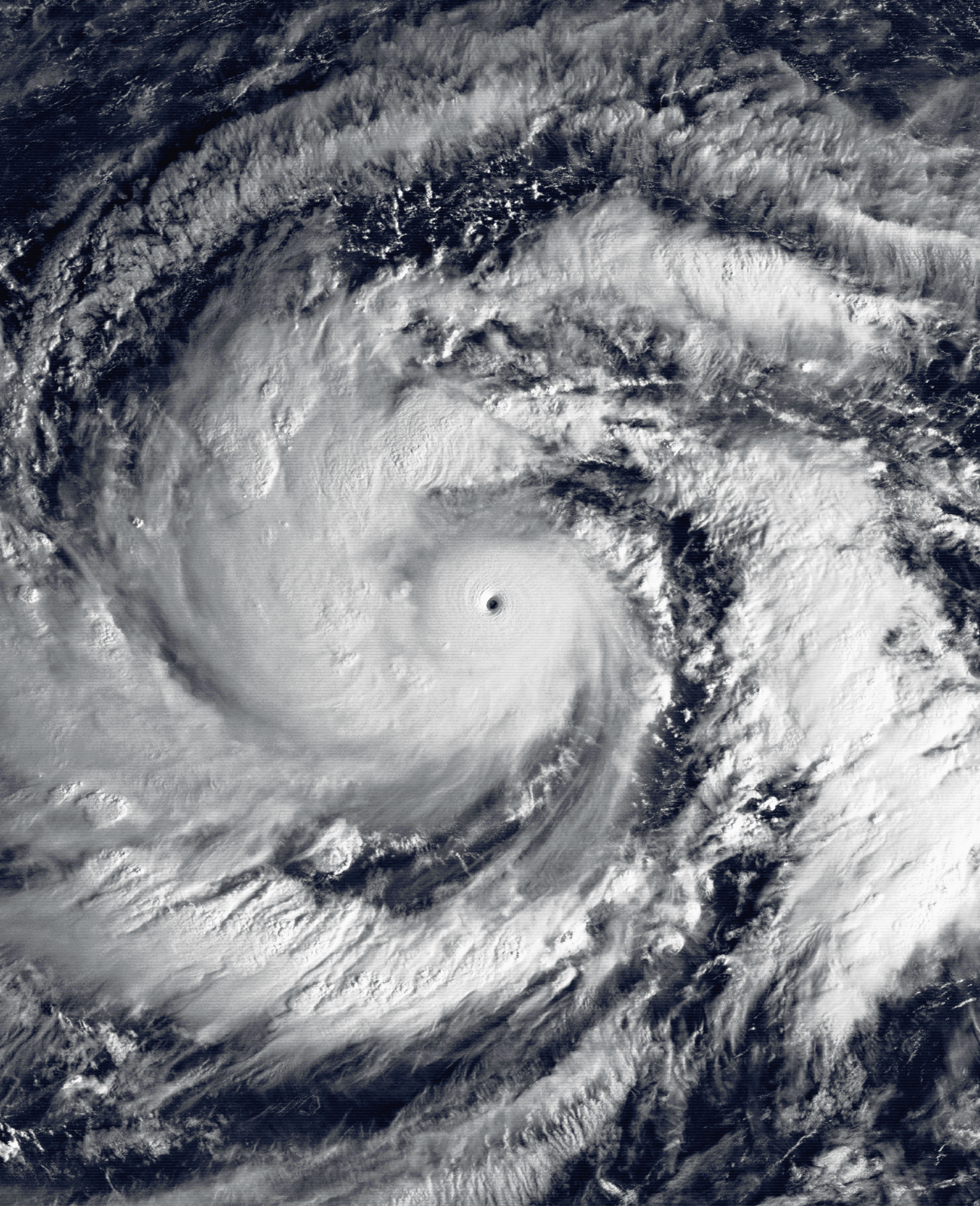
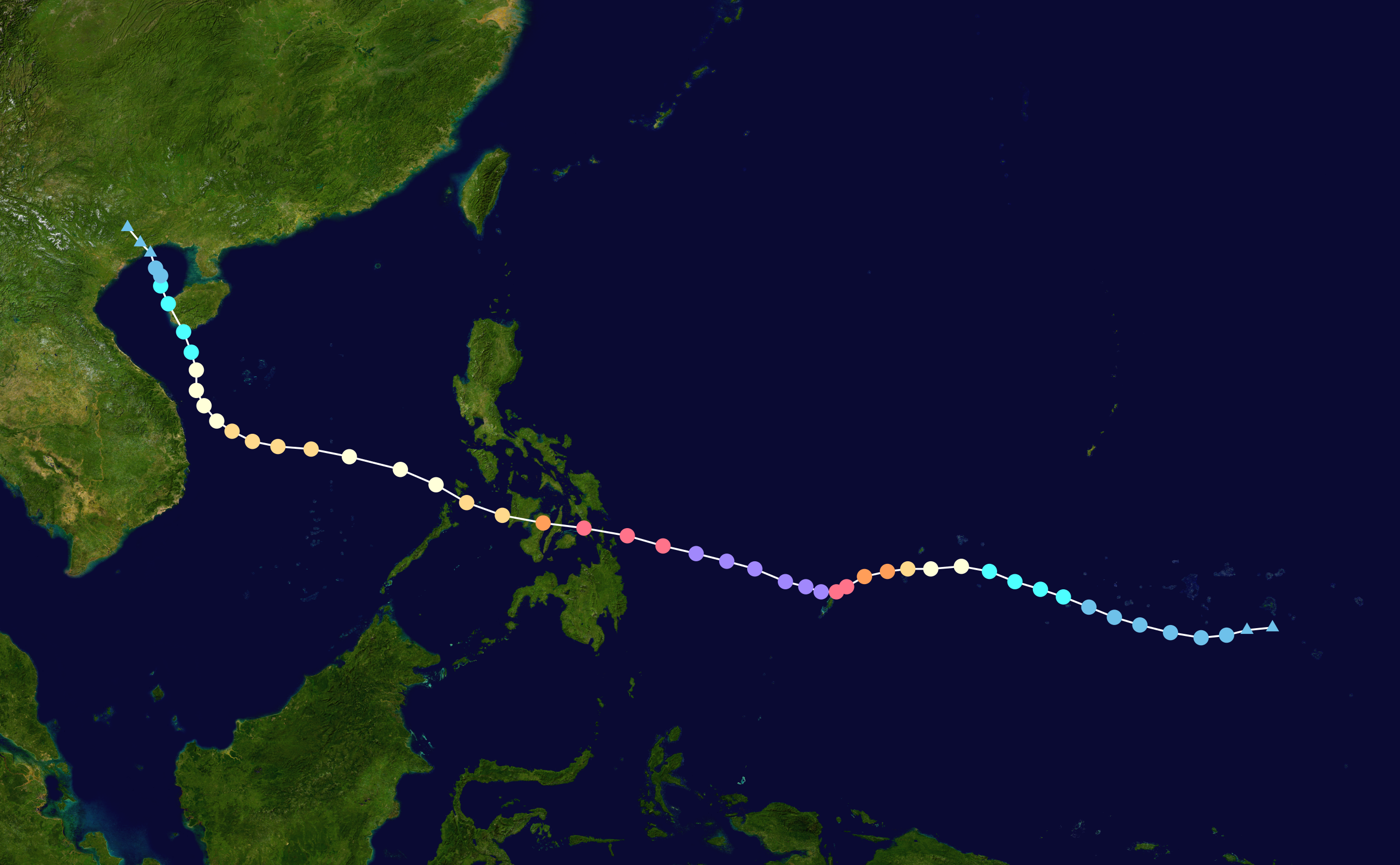
- Duration: November 6 – November 15
- Peak intensity: 185 km/h (115 mph) (10-min); 915 hPa (mbar)

Super Typhoon Mike was the deadliest typhoon of the season. It struck the central Philippines in mid-November, where landslides, flooding, and extreme wind damage to caused over 748 casualties and over $1.94 billion in damage (1990 USD). The name Mike was retired after this season and replaced with Manny.

=== Severe Tropical Storm Nell ===
- Severe tropical storm (JMA)
- Tropical storm (SSHWS)
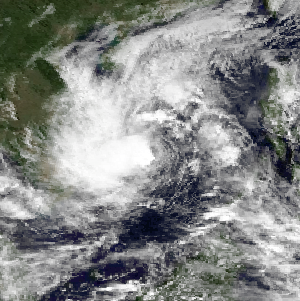
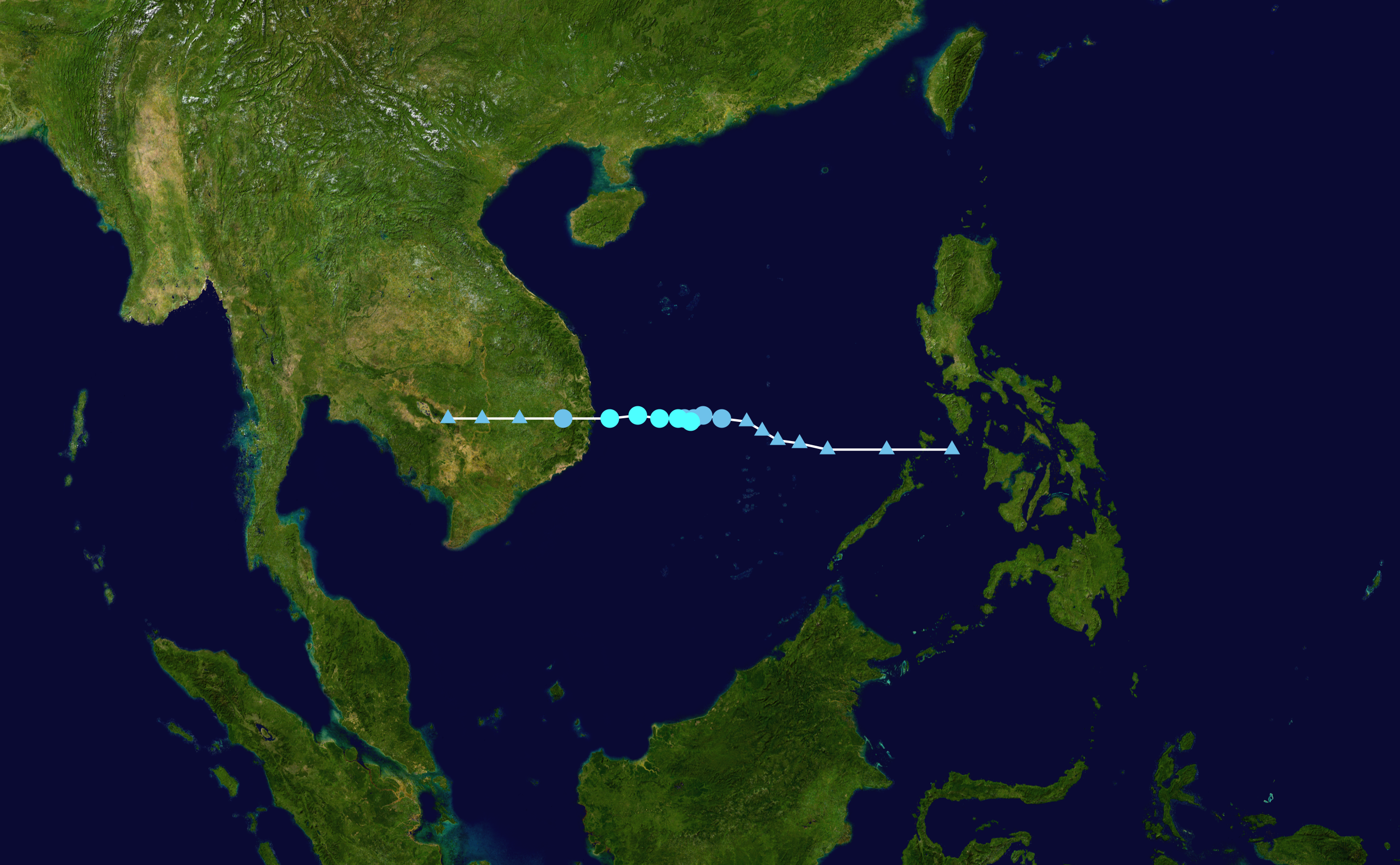
- Duration: November 9 – November 12
- Peak intensity: 95 km/h (60 mph) (10-min); 990 hPa (mbar)

Nell also hit southeast Asia.

=== Tropical Depression Susang ===
- Tropical depression (JMA)
- Duration: November 15 – November 17
- Peak intensity: 55 km/h (35 mph) (10-min); 1004 hPa (mbar)

=== Typhoon Owen (Uding) ===
- Very strong typhoon (JMA)
- Category 5 super typhoon (SSHWS)
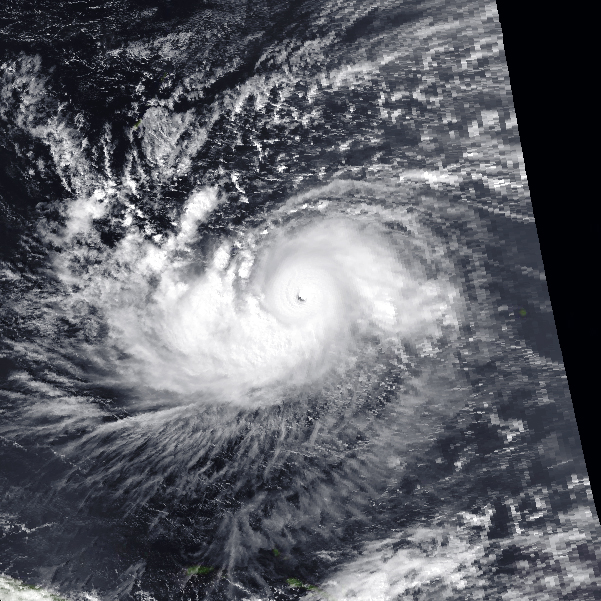
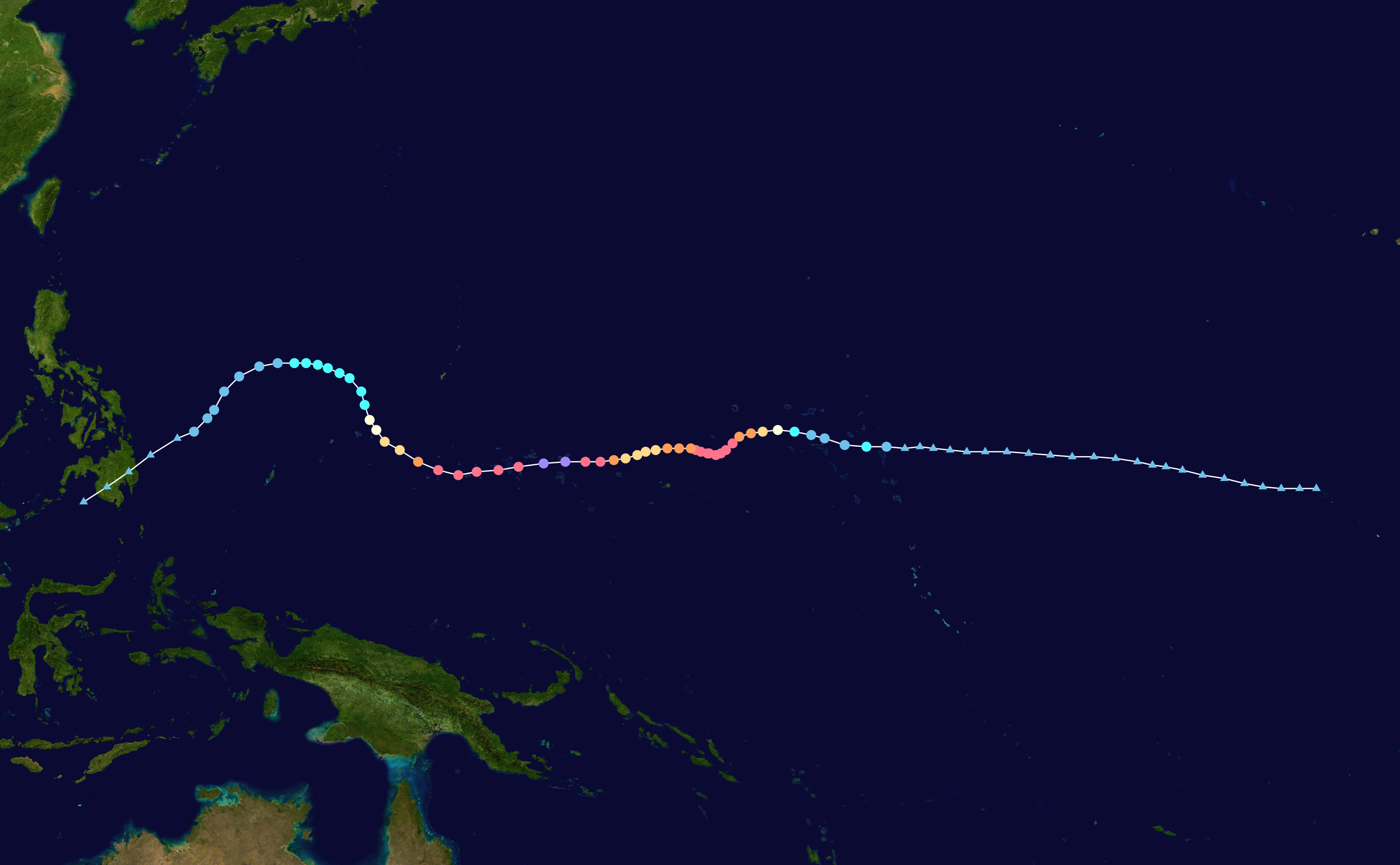
- Duration: November 20 – December 4
- Peak intensity: 175 km/h (110 mph) (10-min); 925 hPa (mbar)

As Super Typhoon Owen crossed the Marshall Islands and Caroline Islands in mid to late November, it caused extreme damage to the many islands. Some islands lost 95%-99% of the dwellings, as well as 80-90% crops being destroyed. Through all of the damage, Owen only killed 2 people.

=== Typhoon Page (Tering) ===
- Violent typhoon (JMA)
- Category 5 super typhoon (SSHWS)
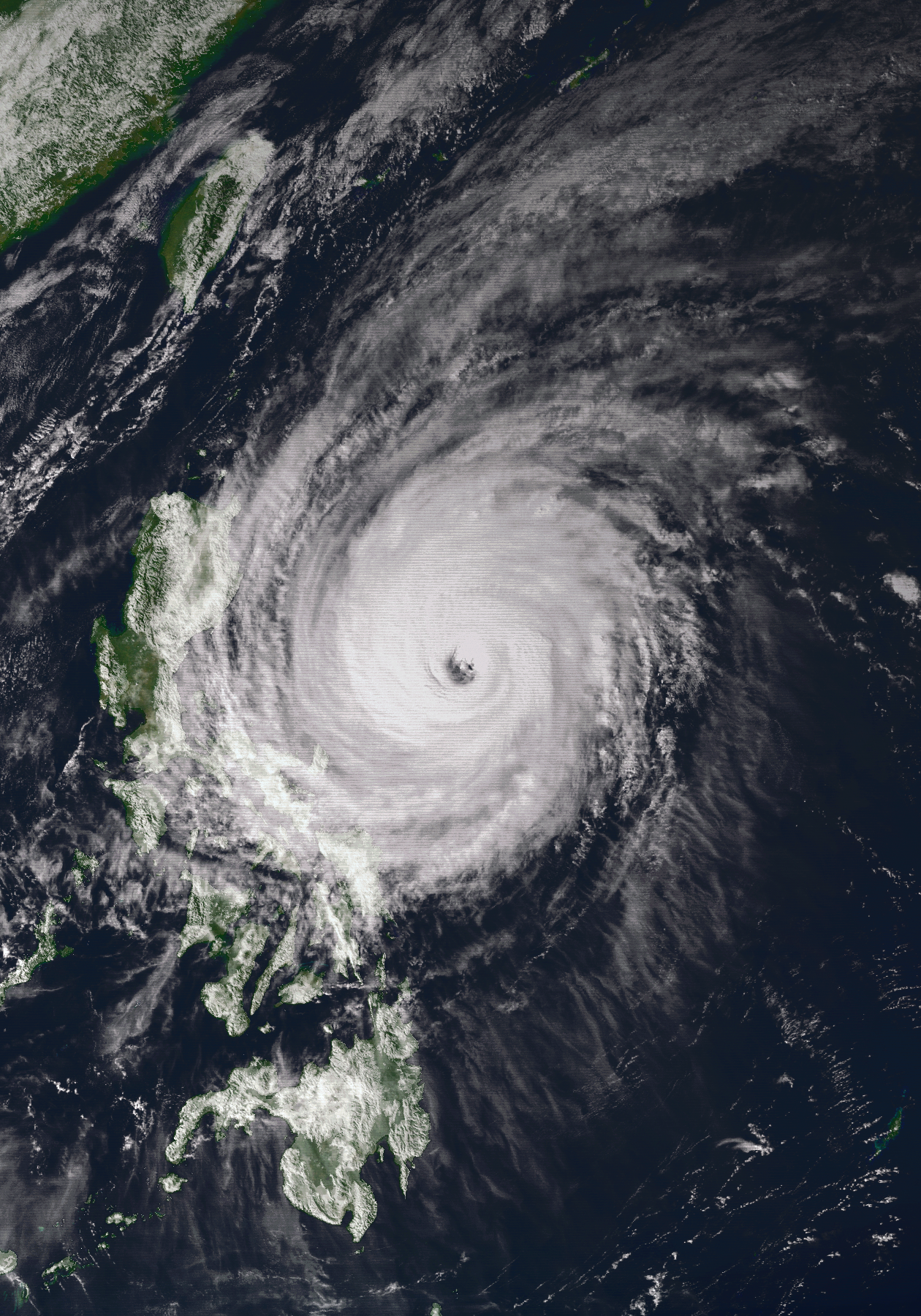
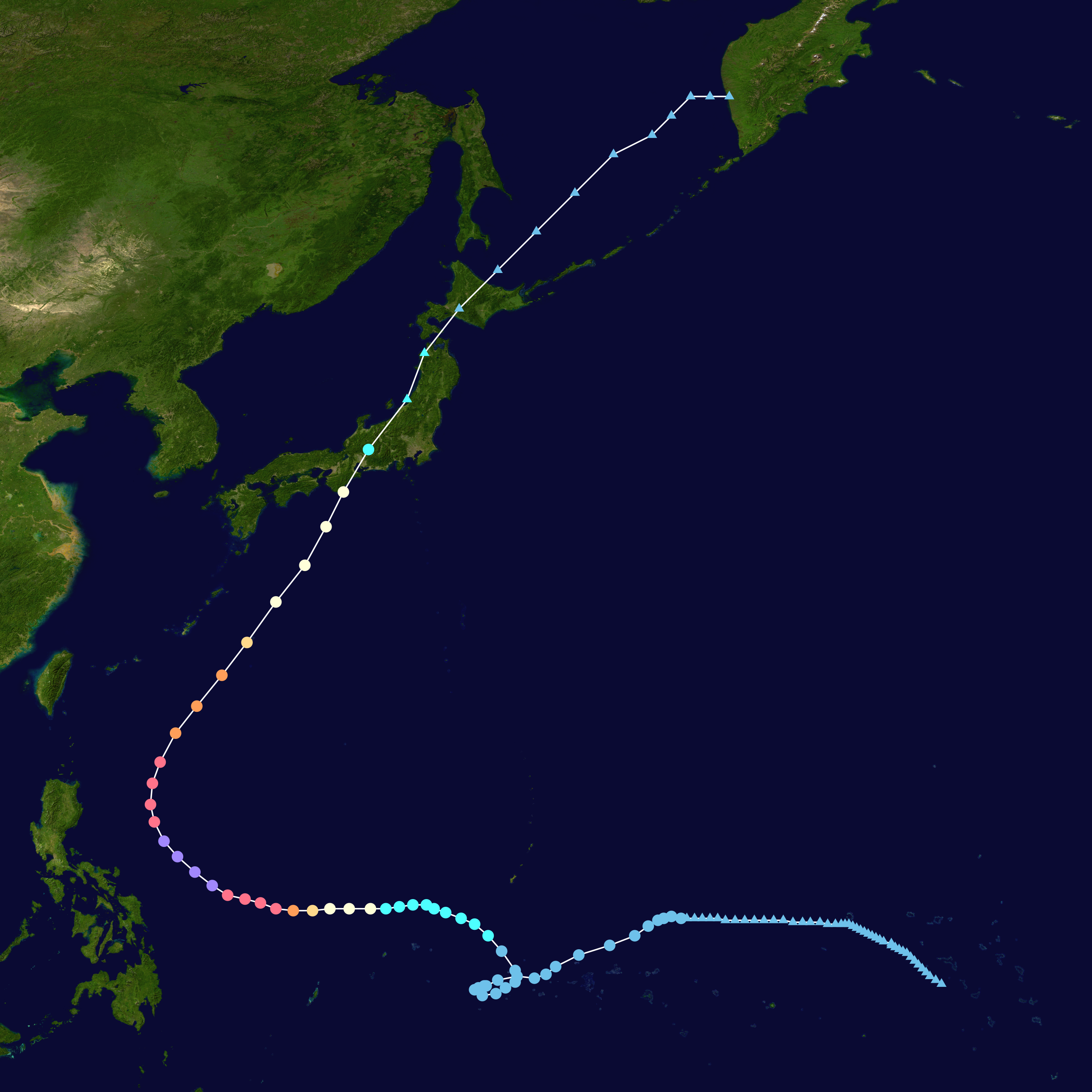
- Duration: November 21 – November 28
- Peak intensity: 195 km/h (120 mph) (10-min); 910 hPa (mbar)

Super Typhoon Page formed on November 21 as a tropical depression. From there, it tracked slowly westward, making a cyclonic loop. Page continued westward, and strengthened into a Category 5 typhoon. It then accelerated northeastward, making landfall in Japan on November 30 as a Category 1 typhoon. Page dissipated over northeast Japan on December 3.

=== Typhoon Russ ===
- Very strong typhoon (JMA)
- Category 4 typhoon (SSHWS)
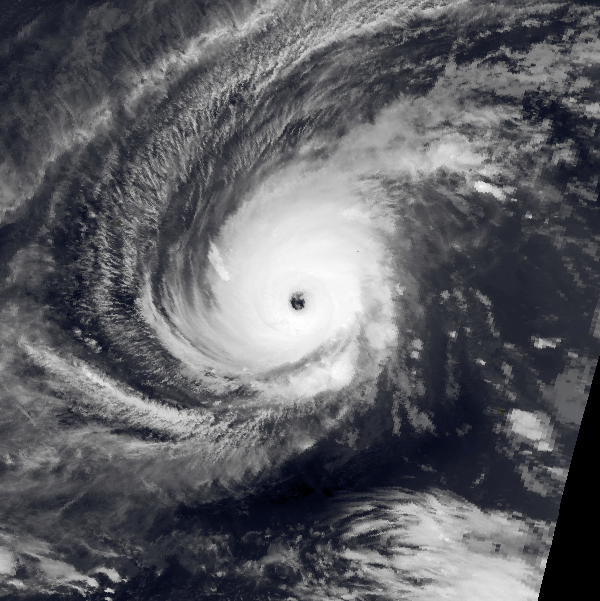
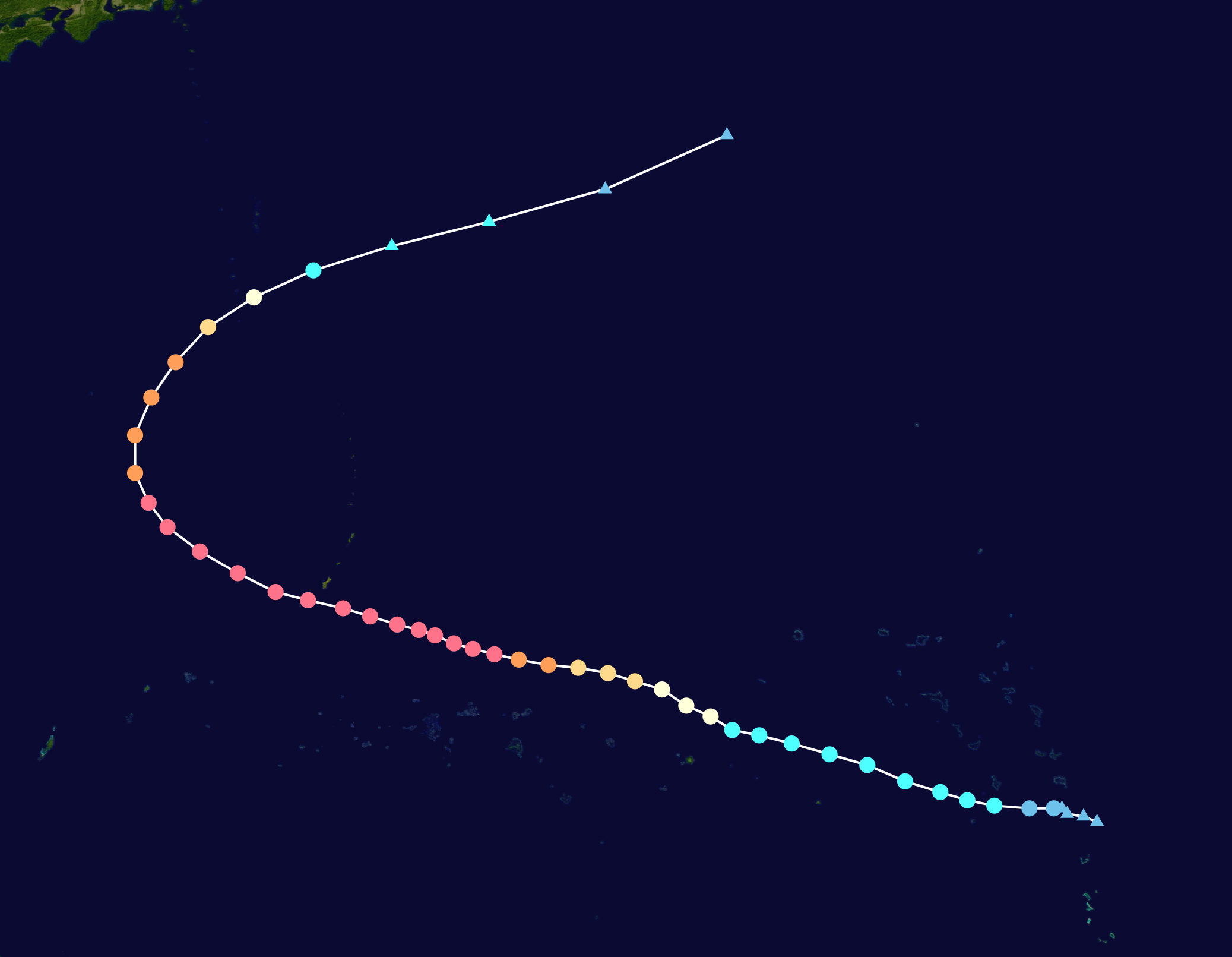
- Duration: December 13 – December 23
- Peak intensity: 185 km/h (115 mph) (10-min); 915 hPa (mbar)

The final storm of the season, Russ, formed on December 13. The typhoon brought heavy damage to Guam when it passed near the island on December 20. Damage estimates ranged as high as $120 million (1990 USD), but nobody perished in the storm.

=== Other systems ===
In addition to the storms listed above, the China Meteorological Agency also monitored three other tropical depressions.

- May 20–23, 55 km/h (35 mph) 1000 mbar (hPa; 29.59 inHg
- May 24–28, 55 km/h (35 mph) 1000 mbar (hPa; 29.59 inHg
- July 20–23, 55 km/h (35 mph) 1000 mbar (hPa; 29.59 inHg

== Storm names ==
During the season 30 named tropical cyclones developed in the Western Pacific and were named by the Joint Typhoon Warning Center, when it was determined that they had become tropical storms. These names were contributed to a revised list which started on mid-1989.

Koryn	Lewis	Marian	Nathan	Ofelia	Percy	Robyn	Steve	Tasha	Vernon	Winona	Yancy	Zola	Abe	Becky
Cecil	Dot	Ed	Flo	Gene	Hattie	Ira	Jeana	Kyle	Lola	Mike	Nell	Owen	Page	Russ

=== Philippines ===
Akang	Bising	Klaring	Deling	Emang
Gading	Heling	Iliang	Loleng	Miding
Norming	Oyang	Pasing	Ruping	Susang
Tering	Uding	Weling (unused)	Yaning (unused)	
Auxiliary list
				Aning (unused)
Bidang (unused)	Katring (unused)	Delang (unused)	Esang (unused)	Garding (unused)

The Philippine Atmospheric, Geophysical and Astronomical Services Administration uses its own naming scheme for tropical cyclones in their area of responsibility. PAGASA assigns names to tropical depressions that form within their area of responsibility and any tropical cyclone that might move into their area of responsibility. Should the list of names for a given year prove to be insufficient, names are taken from an auxiliary list, the first 10 of which are published each year before the season starts. Names not retired from this list will be used again in the 1994 season. This is the same list used for the 1986 season. PAGASA uses its own naming scheme that starts in the Filipino alphabet, with names of Filipino female names ending with "ng" (A, B, K, D, etc.). Names that were not assigned/going to use are marked in gray.

=== Retirement ===
Due to the severity of damage and loss of life caused by Mike, the name was retired and was replaced with Manny and was first used in the 1993 season. PAGASA also retired the name Ruping for similar reasons and was replaced with Ritang for the 1994 season.

== Season effects ==
This table summarizes all the systems that developed within or moved into the North Pacific Ocean, to the west of the International Date Line during 1990. The tables also provide an overview of a systems intensity, duration, land areas affected and any deaths or damages associated with the system.

Name	Dates	Peak intensity			Areas affected	Damage (USD)	Deaths	Ref(s).
Name	Dates	Category	Wind speed	Pressure	Areas affected	Damage (USD)	Deaths	Ref(s).
Koryn	January 12 – 16	Severe tropical storm	100 km/h (65 mph)	980 hPa (28.94 inHg)	Caroline Islands, Mariana Islands	None	None	
Lewis	April 28 – May 4	Tropical storm	65 km/h (40 mph)	998 hPa (29.47 inHg)	Caroline Islands	None	None	
Marian	May 14 – 19	Typhoon	130 km/h (80 mph)	965 hPa (28.50 inHg)	Philippines, Taiwan	$10 million	None	
TD	May 20 – 23	Tropical depression	Not specified	1004 hPa (29.65 inHg)	Philippines	None	None	
TD	May 27 – 28	Tropical depression	Not specified	1006 hPa (29.71 inHg)	South China	None	None	
TD	May 31 – June 1	Tropical depression	Not specified	1004 hPa (29.65 inHg)	None	None	None	
04W	June 13 – 15	Tropical depression	55 km/h (35 mph)	1002 hPa (29.59 inHg)	None	None	None	
Nathan (Akang)	June 13 – 19	Severe tropical storm	100 km/h (65 mph)	980 hPa (28.94 inHg)	Philippines, South China, Vietnam	$346,000	12	
Ofelia (Bising)	June 16 – 25	Typhoon	120 km/h (75 mph)	970 hPa (28.65 inHg)	Philippines, Taiwan, East China, Korean Peninsula	$207 million	96	
Percy (Klaring)	June 20 – 30	Typhoon	150 km/h (90 mph)	950 hPa (28.05 inHg)	Caroline Islands, Philippines, China, Taiwan	$426 million	27	
TD	July 1 – 2	Tropical depression	Not specified	1006 hPa (29.71 inHg)	Philippines	None	None	
Robyn (Deling)	July 4 – 12	Tropical storm	85 km/h (50 mph)	992 hPa (29.29 inHg)	Philippines, Taiwan, Ryukyu Islands, South Korea	None	None	
TD	July 16 – 17	Tropical depression	Not specified	1008 hPa (29.77 inHg)	None	None	None	
TD	July 21 – 23	Tropical depression	Not specified	1002 hPa (29.59 inHg)	Vietnam	Minimal	None	
Tasha (Emang)	July 22 – August 1	Severe tropical storm	100 km/h (65 mph)	980 hPa (28.94 inHg)	Philippines, South China, Vietnam	$71.2 million	108	
Steve	July 23 – August 2	Typhoon	155 km/h (100 mph)	940 hPa (27.76 inHg)	Mariana Islands	None	None	
Vernon	July 28 – August 9	Typhoon	140 km/h (85 mph)	955 hPa (28.20 inHg)	None	None	None	
Winona	August 4 – 11	Severe tropical storm	110 km/h (70 mph)	975 hPa (28.79 inHg)	Japan	$60.3 million	1	
Yancy (Gading)	August 11 – 22	Typhoon	150 km/h (90 mph)	950 hPa (28.05 inHg)	Caroline Islands, Mariana Islands, Taiwan, China	$384 million	284	
Aka	August 13 – 15	Tropical storm	75 km/h (45 mph)	994 hPa (29.35 inHg)	Marshall Islands	None	None	
Zola	August 16 – 23	Typhoon	140 km/h (85 mph)	960 hPa (28.35 inHg)	Mariana Islands, Japan	$104 million	6	
Abe (Iliang)	August 24 – September 1	Typhoon	140 km/h (85 mph)	955 hPa (28.20 inHg)	Caroline Islands, Mariana Islands, Ryukyu Islands, Taiwan, East China, Korean Peninsula	$748 million	195	
Becky (Heling)	August 24 – 30	Typhoon	130 km/h (80 mph)	965 hPa (28.50 inHg)	Philippines, South China, Vietnam, Laos, Thailand, Burma	Unknown	32	
Cecil	September 2 – 4	Tropical storm	85 km/h (50 mph)	1002 hPa (29.59 inHg)	Taiwan, East China	Unknown	42	
Dot (Loleng)	September 3 – 10	Typhoon	140 km/h (85 mph)	960 hPa (28.35 inHg)	Mariana Islands, Philippines, China, Taiwan	$243 million	81	
Ed (Miding)	September 9 – 20	Typhoon	130 km/h (80 mph)	965 hPa (28.50 inHg)	Mariana Islands, Philippines, Vietnam, South China	Unknown	18	
Flo (Norming)	September 12 – 20	Violent typhoon	220 km/h (140 mph)	890 hPa (26.28 inHg)	Caroline Islands, Mariana Islands, Japan	$918 million	40	
TD	September 21 – 22	Tropical depression	Not specified	1008 hPa (29.77 inHg)	Philippines	None	None	
Gene (Oyang)	September 22 – 30	Typhoon	150 km/h (90 mph)	950 hPa (28.05 inHg)	Japan	$158 million	6	
Hattie (Pasing)	September 30 – October 8	Typhoon	150 km/h (90 mph)	950 hPa (28.05 inHg)	Japan	$9.9 million	3	
Ira	October 1 – 3	Tropical storm	65 km/h (40 mph)	996 hPa (29.41 inHg)	Vietnam, Cambodia, Thailand, Myanmar	None	24	
Jeana	October 12 – 14	Tropical storm	85 km/h (50 mph)	1002 hPa (29.59 inHg)	Vietnam, Cambodia	None	None	
Kyle	October 15 – 22	Typhoon	140 km/h (85 mph)	955 hPa (28.20 inHg)	Mariana Islands	None	None	
Lola	October 16 – 19	Tropical storm	65 km/h (40 mph)	998 hPa (29.47 inHg)	Vietnam, Cambodia, Thailand, Myanmar	$2.1 million	23	
Mike (Ruping)	November 6 – 18	Very strong typhoon	185 km/h (115 mph)	915 hPa (27.02 inHg)	Caroline Islands, Philippines, Vietnam, South China	$448 million	816	
Nell	November 9 – 12	Severe tropical storm	95 km/h (60 mph)	990 hPa (29.23 inHg)	Vietnam, Cambodia, Thailand	None	Unknown	
Susang	November 15 – 17	Tropical depression	Not specified	1004 hPa (29.65 inHg)	Philippines	None	None	
TD	November 16 – 18	Tropical depression	Not specified	1004 hPa (29.65 inHg)	Caroline Islands	None	None	
Owen (Uding)	November 20 – December 4	Very strong typhoon	175 km/h (110 mph)	925 hPa (27.32 inHg)	Marshall Islands, Caroline Islands	None	2	
Page (Tering)	November 21 – 30	Violent typhoon	195 km/h (120 mph)	910 hPa (26.87 inHg)	Caroline Islands, Philippines, Japan	$33 million	4	
Russ	December 13 – 23	Very strong typhoon	185 km/h (115 mph)	915 hPa (27.02 inHg)	Marshall Islands, Mariana Islands, Caroline Islands	$120 million	None	
Season aggregates
41 systems	January 12 – December 23, 1990		220 km/h (140 mph)	890 hPa (26.28 inHg)		$3.94 billion	1,780	

== See also ==
- 1990 Pacific hurricane season
- 1990 Atlantic hurricane season
- 1990 North Indian Ocean cyclone season
- South-West Indian Ocean cyclone season: 1989–90, 1990–91
- Australian region cyclone season: 1989–90, 1990–91
- South Pacific cyclone season: 1989–90, 1990–91
