= 1989 North Indian Ocean cyclone season =

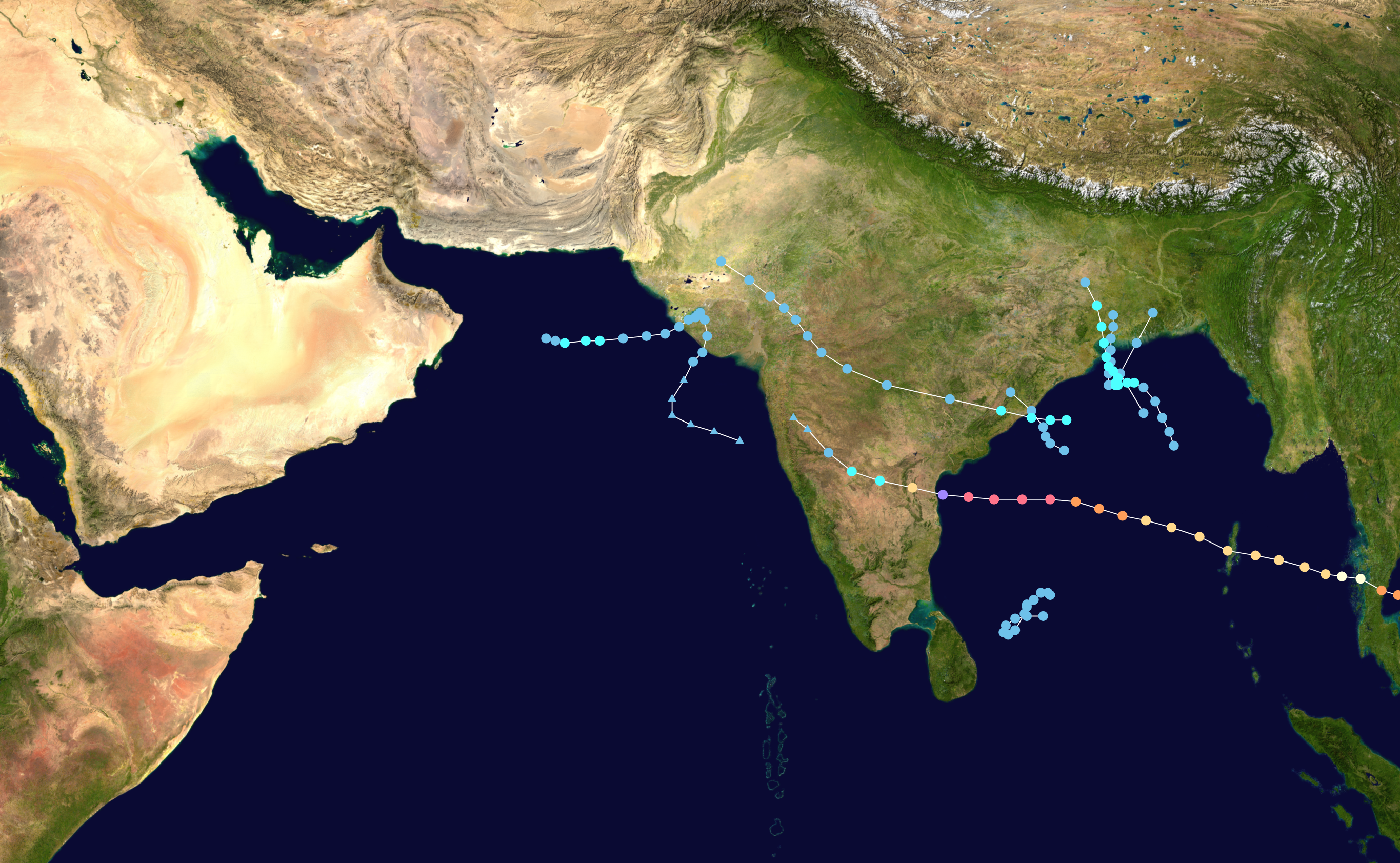
- Season summary map

Seasonal boundaries
- First system formed: May 23, 1989
- Last system dissipated: November 10, 1989

Strongest storm
- Name: Gay
  - Maximum winds: 230 km/h (145 mph) (3-minute sustained)
  - Lowest pressure: 930 hPa (mbar)

Seasonal statistics
- Depressions: 10
- Deep depressions: 7
- Cyclonic storms: 3
- Severe cyclonic storms: 2
- Very severe cyclonic storms: 1
- Super cyclonic storms: 1
- Total fatalities: 1,785 total
- Total damage: $25.27 million (1989 USD)

Related articles
- 1989 Atlantic hurricane season; 1989 Pacific hurricane season; 1989 Pacific typhoon season

The 1989 North Indian Ocean cyclone season was a below-average season in annual cycle of tropical cyclone formation. Despite this, the season had the third highest Accumulated Cyclone Energy in the basin on record behind only 2019 and 2023. The season has no official bounds but cyclones tend to form between April and December. These dates conventionally delimit the period of each year when most tropical cyclones form in the northern Indian Ocean. There are two main seas in the North Indian Ocean—the Bay of Bengal to the east of the Indian subcontinent and the Arabian Sea to the west of India. The official Regional Specialized Meteorological Centre in this basin is the India Meteorological Department (IMD), while the Joint Typhoon Warning Center (JTWC) releases unofficial advisories. An average of five tropical cyclones form in the North Indian Ocean every season with peaks in May and November. Cyclones occurring between the meridians 45°E and 100°E are included in the season by the IMD.

Throughout the season, the IMD monitored ten depressions, three of which became cyclonic storms. The strongest storm of the year was Super Cyclonic Storm Gay. Crossing the Malay Peninsula into the Bay of Bengal on November 4, Gay became one of the most powerful systems on record in the basin, attaining an estimated pressure of 930 mbar (hPa; 27.46 inHg). Collectively, the storms were responsible for at least 1,785 fatalities, 1,445 of which were due to the disastrous flooding triggered by the July Cyclonic Storm, and more than $25 million in damage.

== Systems ==
=== Severe Cyclonic Storm BOB 01 ===
- Severe cyclonic storm (IMD)
- Tropical storm (SSHWS)
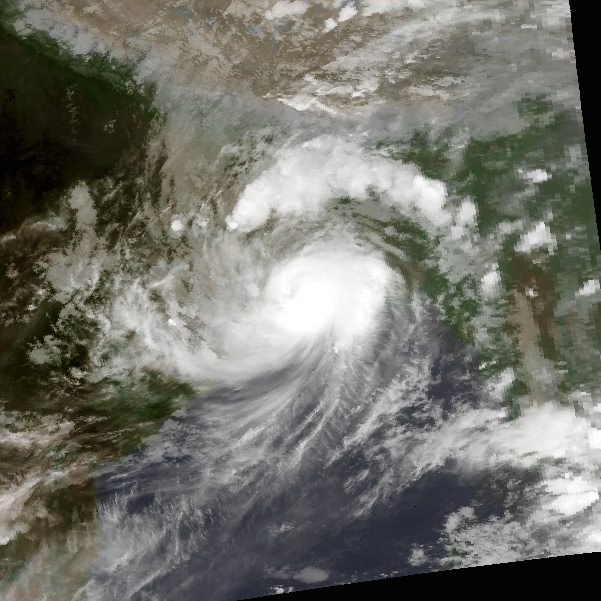
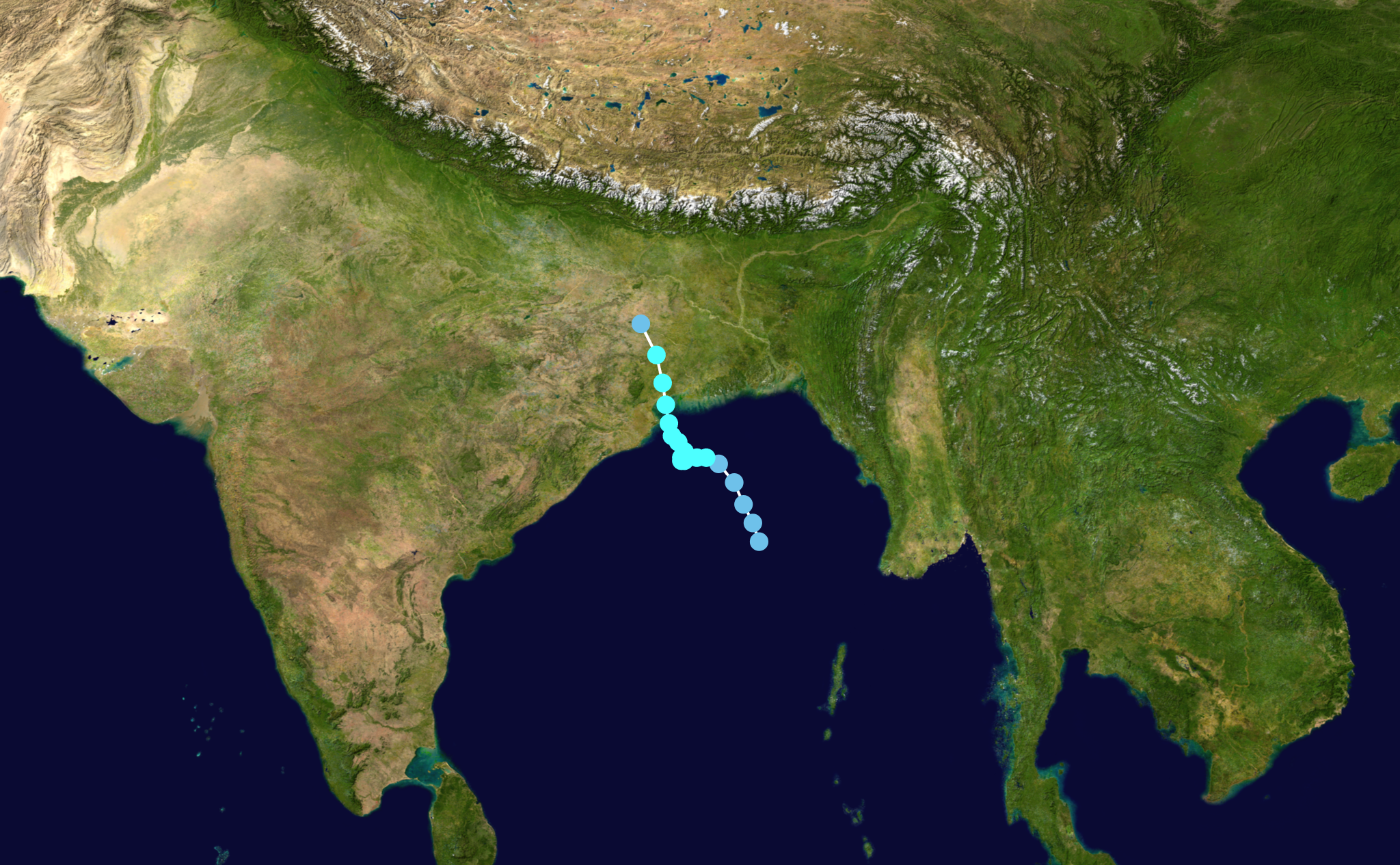
- Duration: May 23 – May 27
- Peak intensity: 100 km/h (65 mph) (1-min); 984 hPa (mbar)

In mid-May, a monsoon trough situated over the Bay of Bengal began showing signs of cyclonic development. By May 20, synoptic data indicated the presence of a weak circulation; however, the system remained disorganized. Following a dramatic increase in convection and organization, the JTWC issued a Tropical Cyclone Formation Alert on May 23 and subsequently began monitoring the system as a tropical depression hours later. Initially, the depression tracked slowly towards the north-northwest before abruptly turning westward and slowing due to weak mid-level steering currents. During this time, the storm gradually intensified and was limited by northwesterly wind shear. By May 26, the storm turned northward and accelerated. Later that day, 01B attained its peak intensity with winds of 100 km/h (60 mph) shortly before making landfall in eastern India. The system quickly weakened once inland and was last noted on May 27 as a dissipating low.

Striking India on May 26, the storm brought wind gusts up to 130 km/h (80 mph) and torrential rains, amounting to 210 mm (8.3 in), which caused widespread damage. The hardest hit area was Midnapore where more than 10,000 homes were destroyed. At least 17 people were killed in the district alone and more than 50,000 were left homeless. Communications across Orissa were severely disrupted as broadcast stations, government buildings, and hundreds of telephone poles were destroyed. Further inland, heavy rains from the storm triggered several landslides that killed at least two people in Darjeeling Hills. Throughout eastern India, 61 people were killed and more than 500,000 were left homeless by the storm.

In nearby Bangladesh, strong winds produced by the storm destroyed 500 homes across 11 villages. Areas devastated by a tornado a month prior were severely affected by the cyclone. In Tangail, a powerful tornado spawned by the storm destroyed 2,000 homes and killed 10 people. At least 60 people perished and 2,000 others were injured across the country. Offshore, 150 fishermen went missing during the storm and were feared dead. In the wake of the storm, widespread search and rescue missions took place in cities flattened by the cyclone.

=== Deep Depression ARB 01 ===
- Deep depression (IMD)
- Tropical storm (SSHWS)
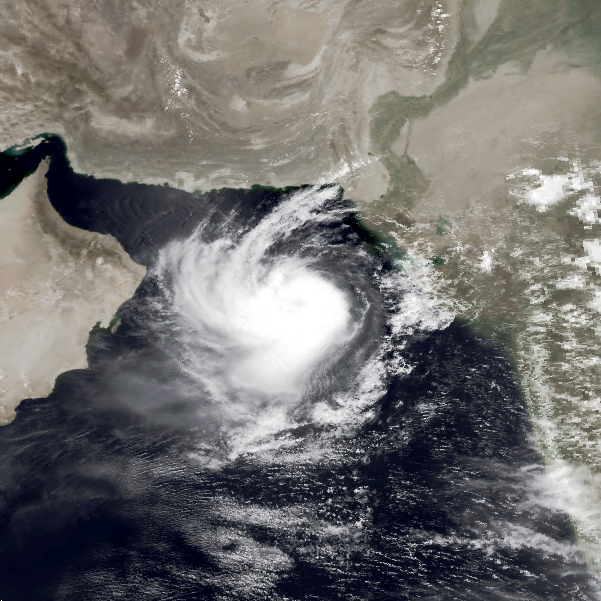
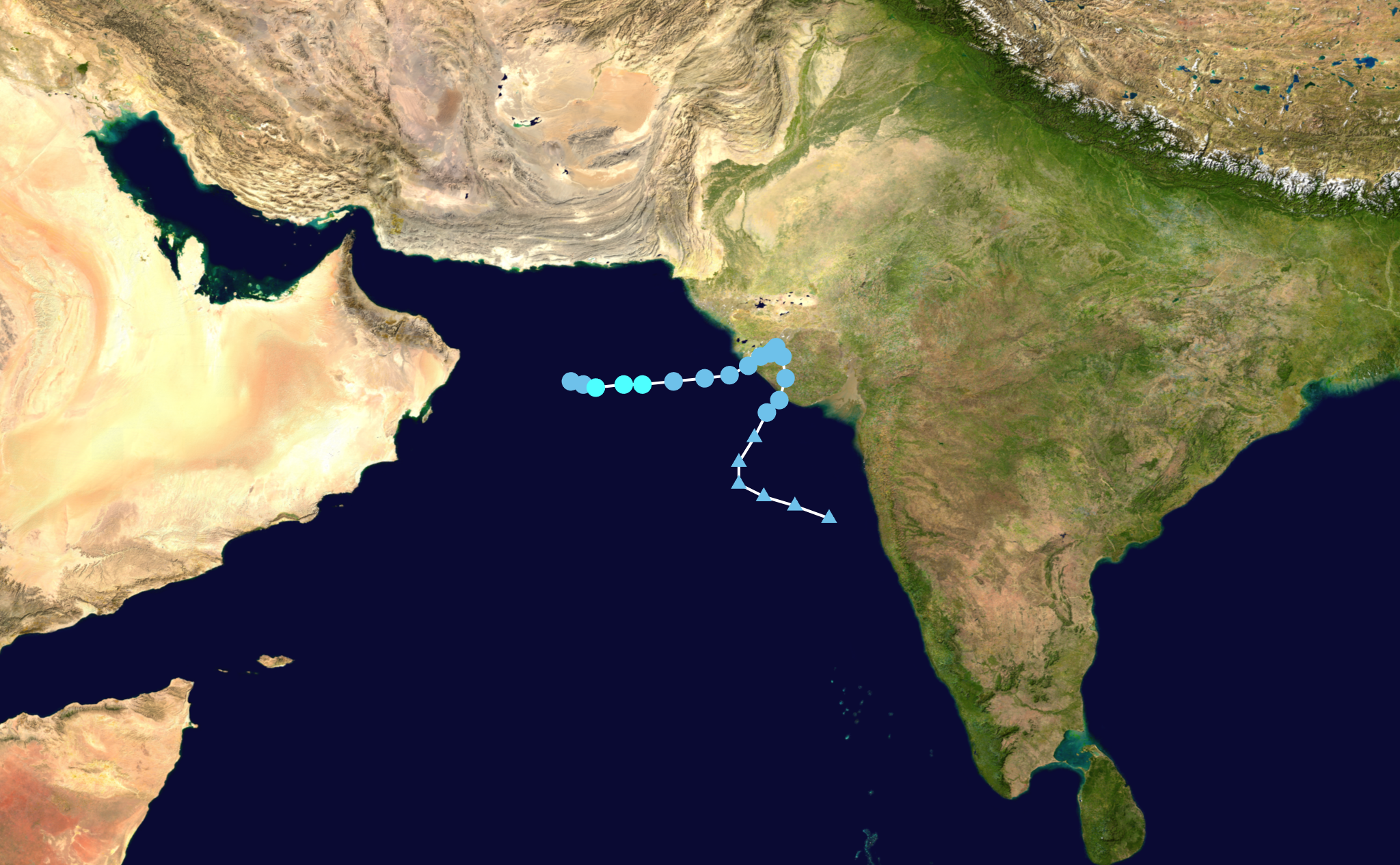
- Duration: June 7 – June 13
- Peak intensity: 55 km/h (35 mph) (3-min); 996 hPa (mbar)

On June 7, small area of low pressure developed off the west coast of India. Over the following two days, convection associated with the low gradually organized and by June 9, satellite intensity estimates from the JTWC reached 55 km/h (35 mph). A TCFA was subsequently issued for the system before it made landfall in Gujarat early on June 10. Although overland, the low maintained significant convection as it turned westward and through its re-emergence into the Arabian Sea on June 11. Once back over water, convection rapidly spread westward in response to an anticyclone over the Arabian Peninsula and Afghanistan. Early on June 12, the cyclone was estimated to have attained tropical storm status based on a ship report near the center of 65 km/h (40 mph) sustained winds and a surface pressure of 998 mbar (hPa; 29.47 inHg). Later that day, strong wind shear stemming from the anticyclone displaced convection from the tropical storm by more than 110 km (70 mi), prompting the final advisory from the JTWC. The remnants of the system were last noted on June 13, dissipating over the Arabian Sea.

=== Deep Depression BOB 02 ===
- Deep depression (IMD)
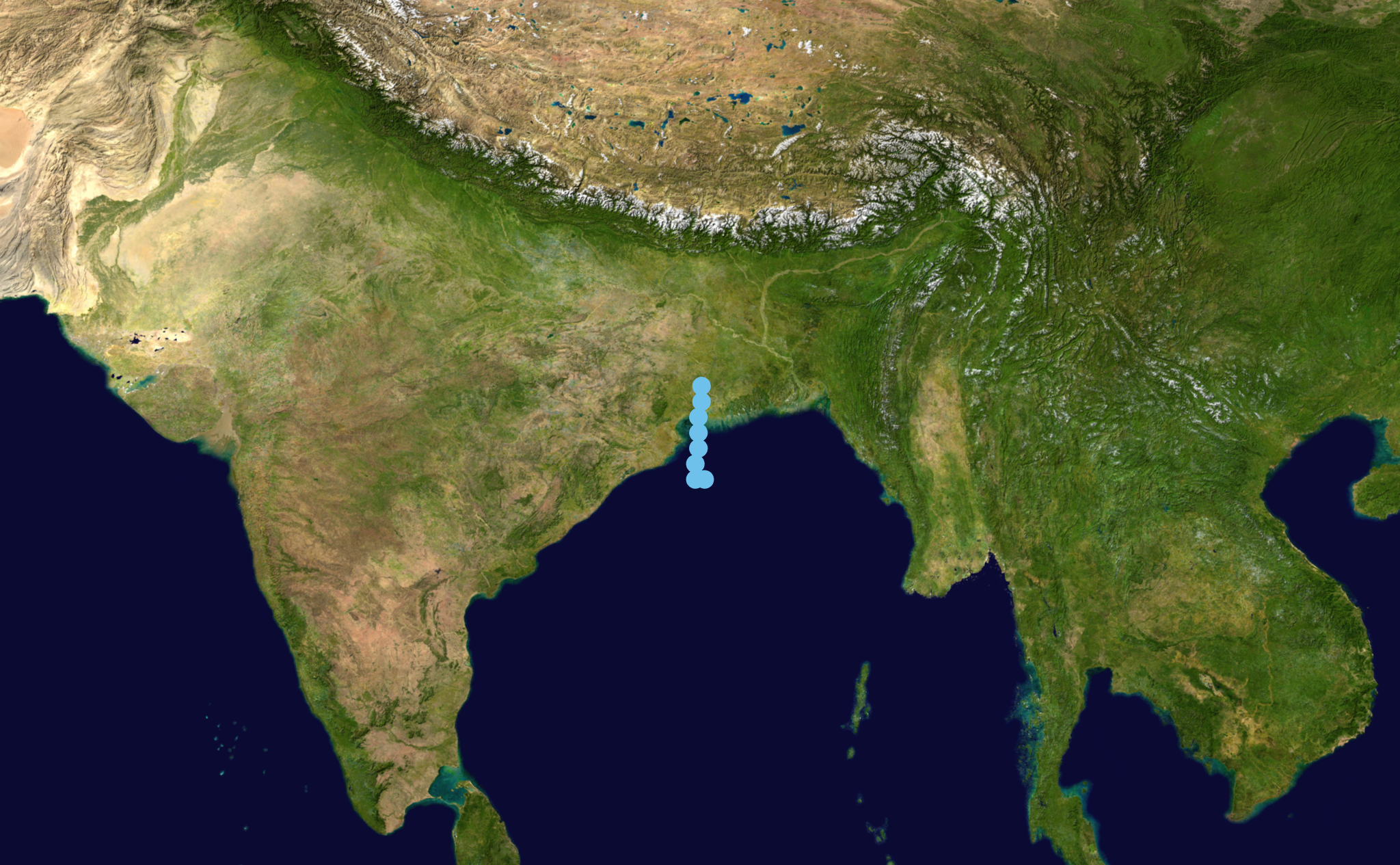
- Duration: June 12 – June 14
- Peak intensity: 55 km/h (35 mph) (3-min);

On June 12, a tropical depression formed in the northern Bay of Bengal. It moved northward before making landfall near Orissa, India at deep depression status.

=== Cyclonic Storm BOB 04 ===
- Cyclonic storm (IMD)
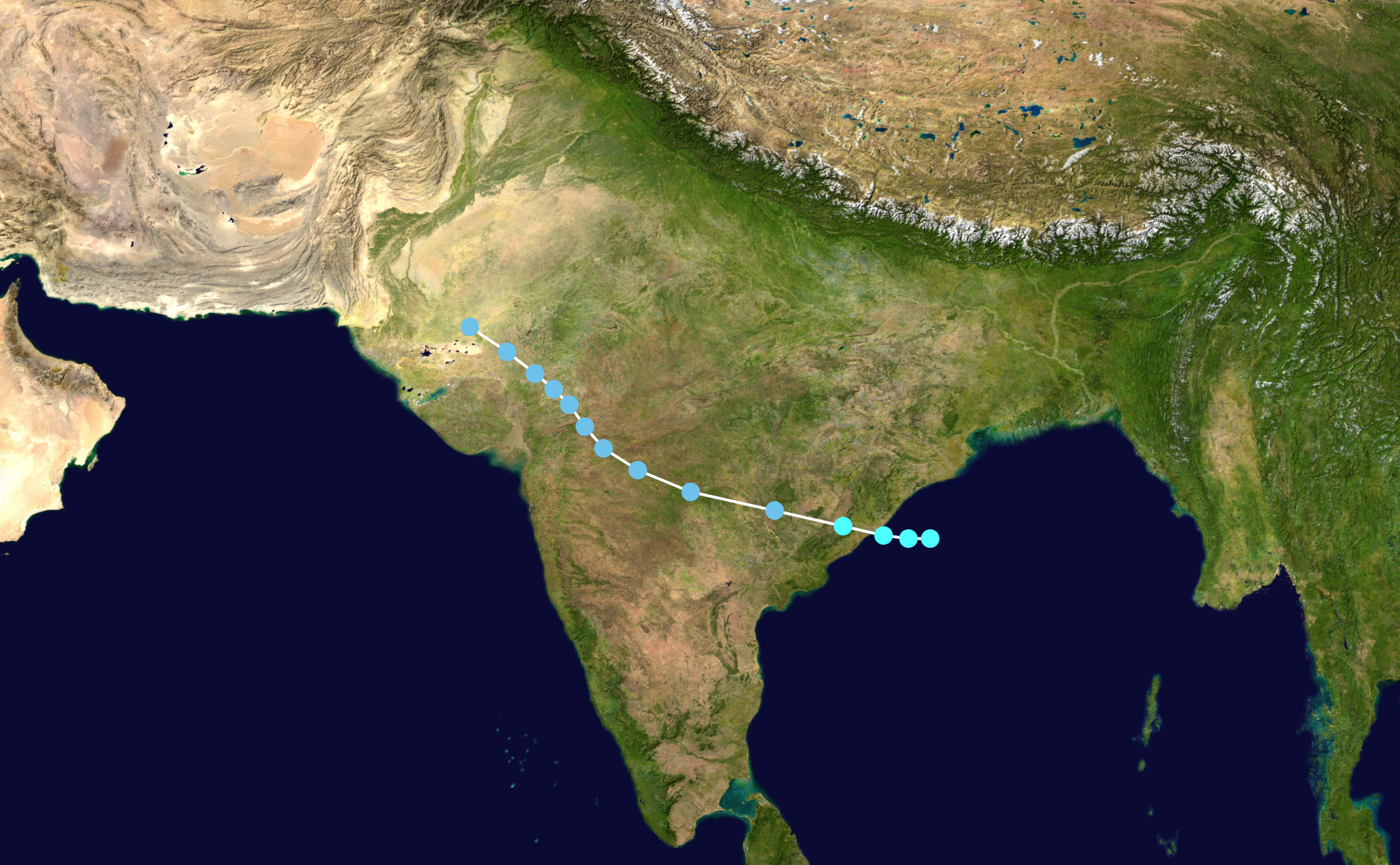
- Duration: July 21 – July 25
- Peak intensity: 85 km/h (50 mph) (3-min);

On July 22, the IMD began monitoring a depression over the Bay of Bengal. Tracking west-northwest, the system intensified into a cyclonic storm later that day before making landfall in Andhra Pradesh, just north of Vishakhapatnam. Once onshore the storm accelerated towards the northwest and weakened. By July 24, the remnants of the cyclone were located over the state of Maharashtra. The system was last noted the following day over Gujarat and moving into Pakistan.

Across Andhra Pradesh, Orissa, and Uttar Pradesh heavy rains produced by the storm triggered flash flooding and mudslides that killed at least 414 people. According to Chief Minister Nandamuri Taraka Rama Rao, approximately 70,000 homes were destroyed in Andhra Pradesh. While over Maharashtra, the storm produced torrential rainfall, reaching 280 mm (11 in) in 24 hours in Bombay, which caused deadly flash flooding and mudslides. Most of the railway tracks in metropolitan Bombay were left underwater, paralyzing the city and forcing businesses to close for several days. The city's stock exchange remained open, though only sparse trading was observed. Flood waters isolated 46 villages in the region, prompting the deployment of the Indian Army for rescue missions. At least 500 people were killed throughout Maharashtra, more than 200 of which took place in the Raigad district. An unknown number of people were killed after a bridge collapsed with two train carriages on it. Additionally, 75 others were reported missing in the district according to local police. Offshore, 500 fishermen went missing in connection to the storm and are believed to have died.

Flooding rains extended into Pakistan by July 26. Flash floods in the slums outside Karachi killed at least 16 people and washed away 500 huts. An estimated 20,000 people were left homeless in the city. Communication and transportation throughout Karachi was reportedly paralyzed as well due to widespread power outages. Further north in Hyderabad, six others were killed by the storm. Throughout the country, at least 31 people were killed.

=== Deep Depression BOB 05 ===
- Deep depression (IMD)
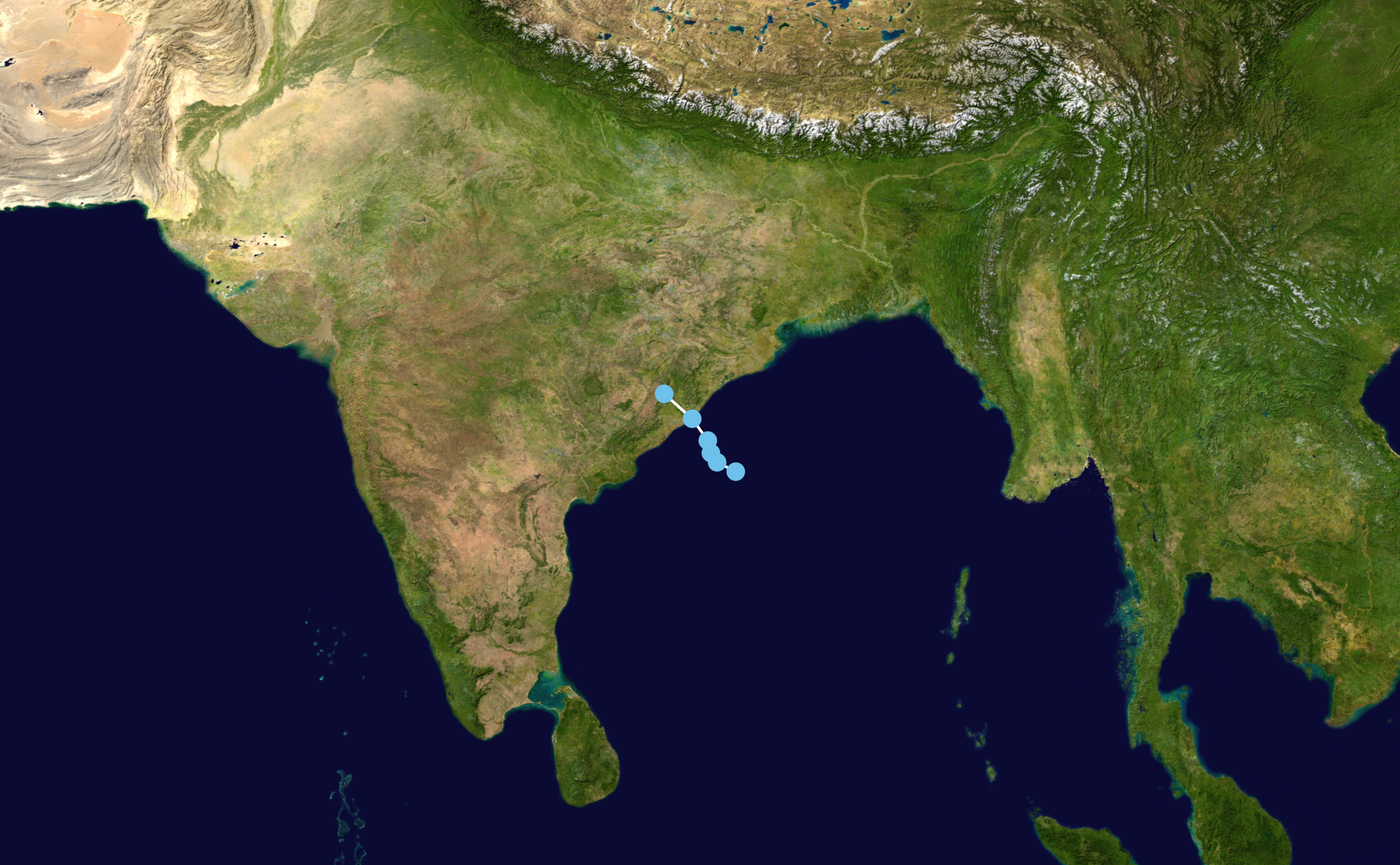
- Duration: August 16 – August 17
- Peak intensity: 55 km/h (35 mph) (3-min);

On August 16, a tropical depression formed in the Bay of Bengal. It moved northward before making landfall near Andhra Pradesh on August 17.

=== Depression BOB 06 ===
- Depression (IMD)
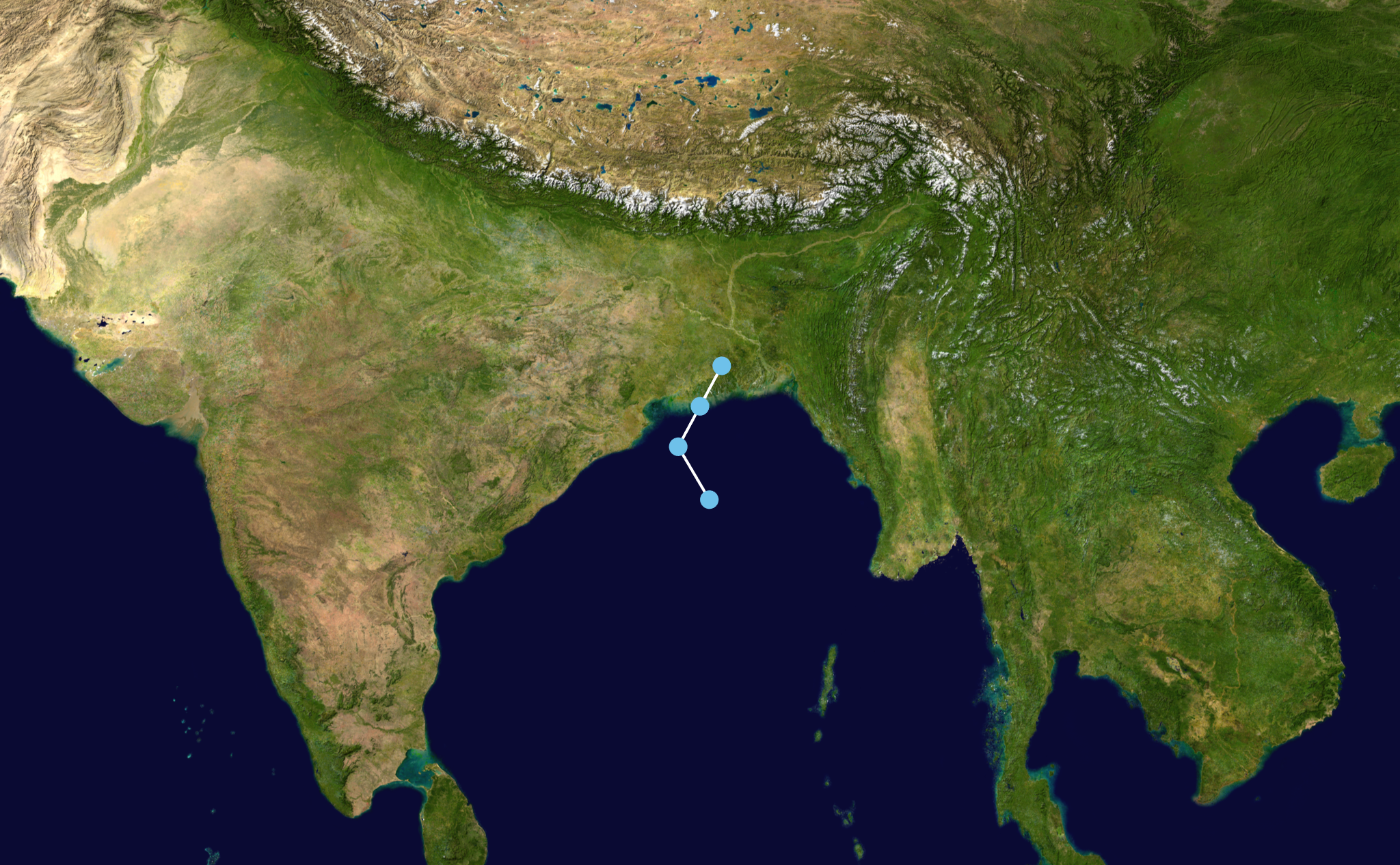
- Duration: October 17 – October 18
- Peak intensity: 45 km/h (30 mph) (3-min);

Through October 17-18, a weak depression existed in the Bay of Bengal, making landfall in Bangladesh. Across the country, heavy rains and high winds, estimated at 60 to 70 km/h (37 to 43 mph), caused significant damage. At least 100 people were injured and 1,000 homes were damaged or destroyed, mainly in the Chandpur District. Following the storm, the Bangladesh Red Crescent Society dispatched four medical teams and relief materials to the affected regions.

=== Super Cyclonic Storm BOB 07 (Gay) ===
- Super cyclonic storm (IMD)
- Category 5 tropical cyclone (SSHWS)
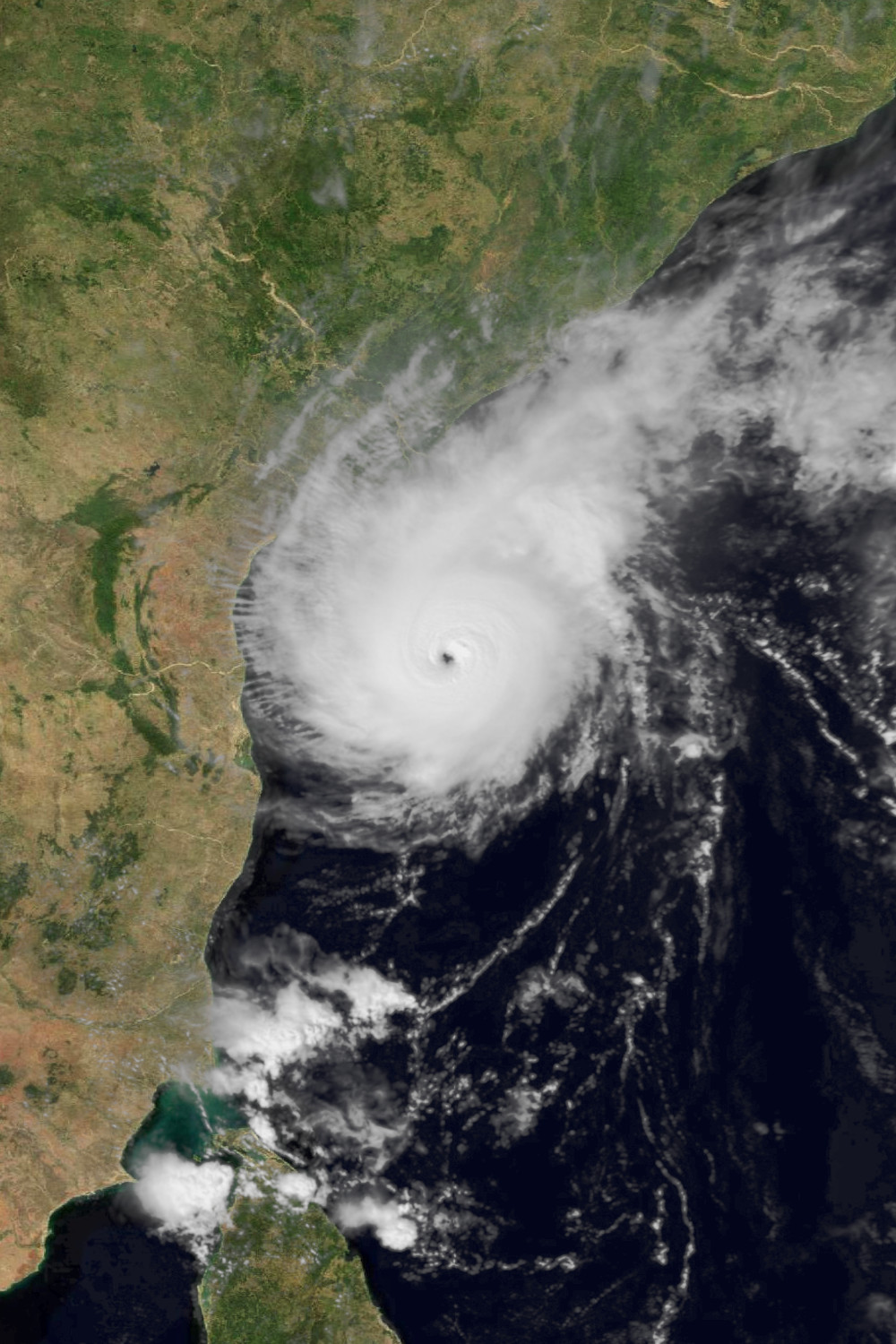
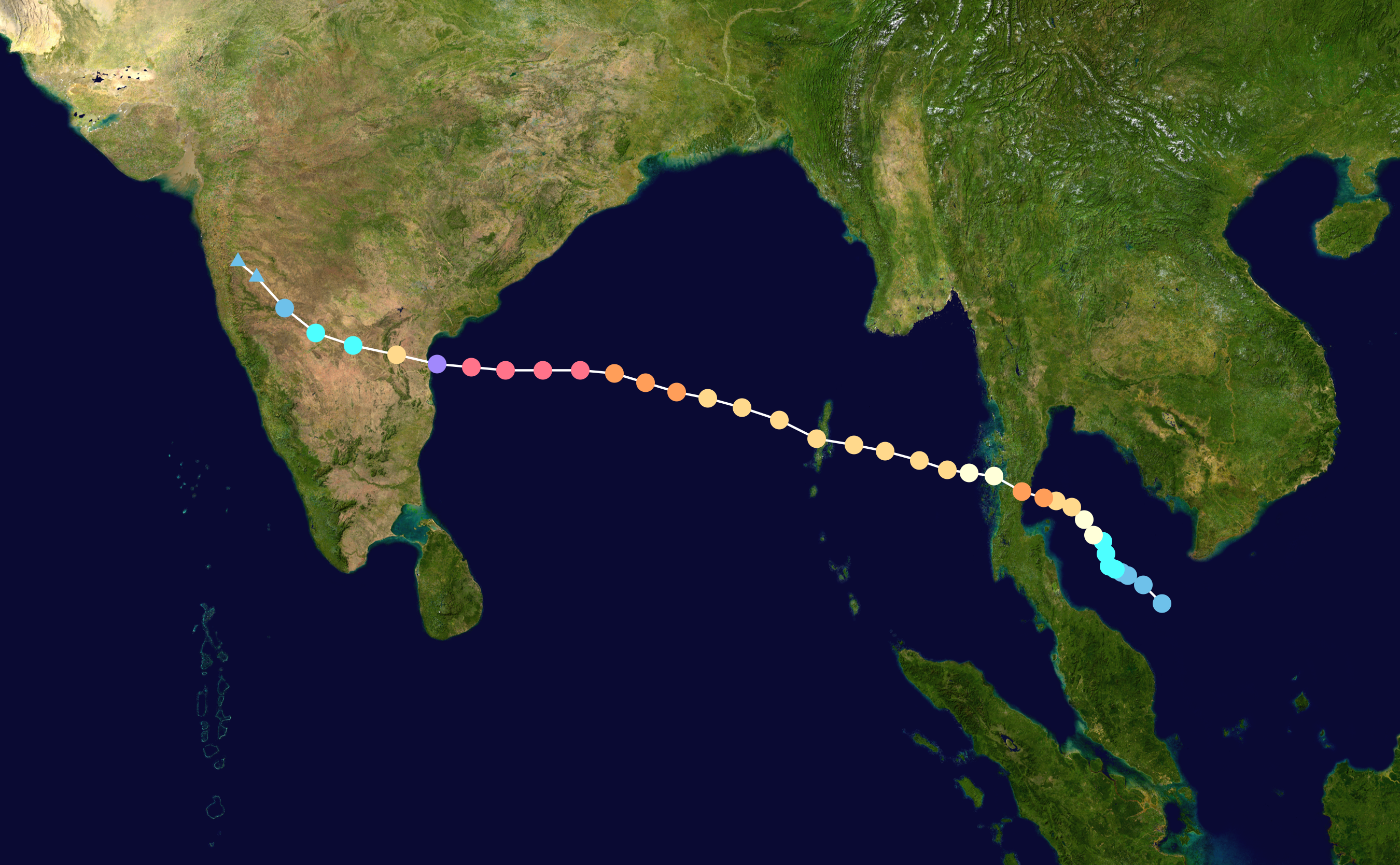
- Duration: November 4 (entered basin) – November 10
- Peak intensity: 230 km/h (145 mph) (3-min); 930 hPa (mbar)

On November 2, a tropical depression, later named Gay, developed in the Gulf of Thailand and favorable atmospheric conditions allowed the system to undergo rapid intensification. By November 3, Gay had intensified to a Category 3-equivalent typhoon before striking Thailand. Crossing the Kra Isthmus in approximately six hours, the system emerged into the Bay of Bengal as a Category 1-equivalent cyclone and assumed a west-northwesterly track towards India. For the next four days, the storm gradually reorganized before reaching a small area favorable for more significant intensification late on November 6. Hours before making landfall in India, Gay attained its peak intensity as a Category 5-equivalent cyclone with winds estimated at 260 km/h (160 mph). Additionally, the IMD estimated that the storm had three-minute sustained winds of 240 km/h (150 mph), classifying Gay as a modern-day Super Cyclonic Storm. The powerful storm soon made landfall near Kavali, India, in Andhra Pradesh before rapidly weakening onshore. The system eventually dissipated over Maharashtra on November 10.

In Thailand, the storm caused extensive damage both onshore and off, killing 833 people and inflicting approximately ฿11 billion (US$497 million) in damage. Striking India as a powerful cyclone, Gay damaged or destroyed about 20,000 homes in Andhra Pradesh, leaving 100,000 people homeless. In that country, 69 deaths and ₹410 million (US$25.3 million) in damage were attributed to Gay.

=== Deep Depression BOB 09 ===
- Deep depression (IMD)
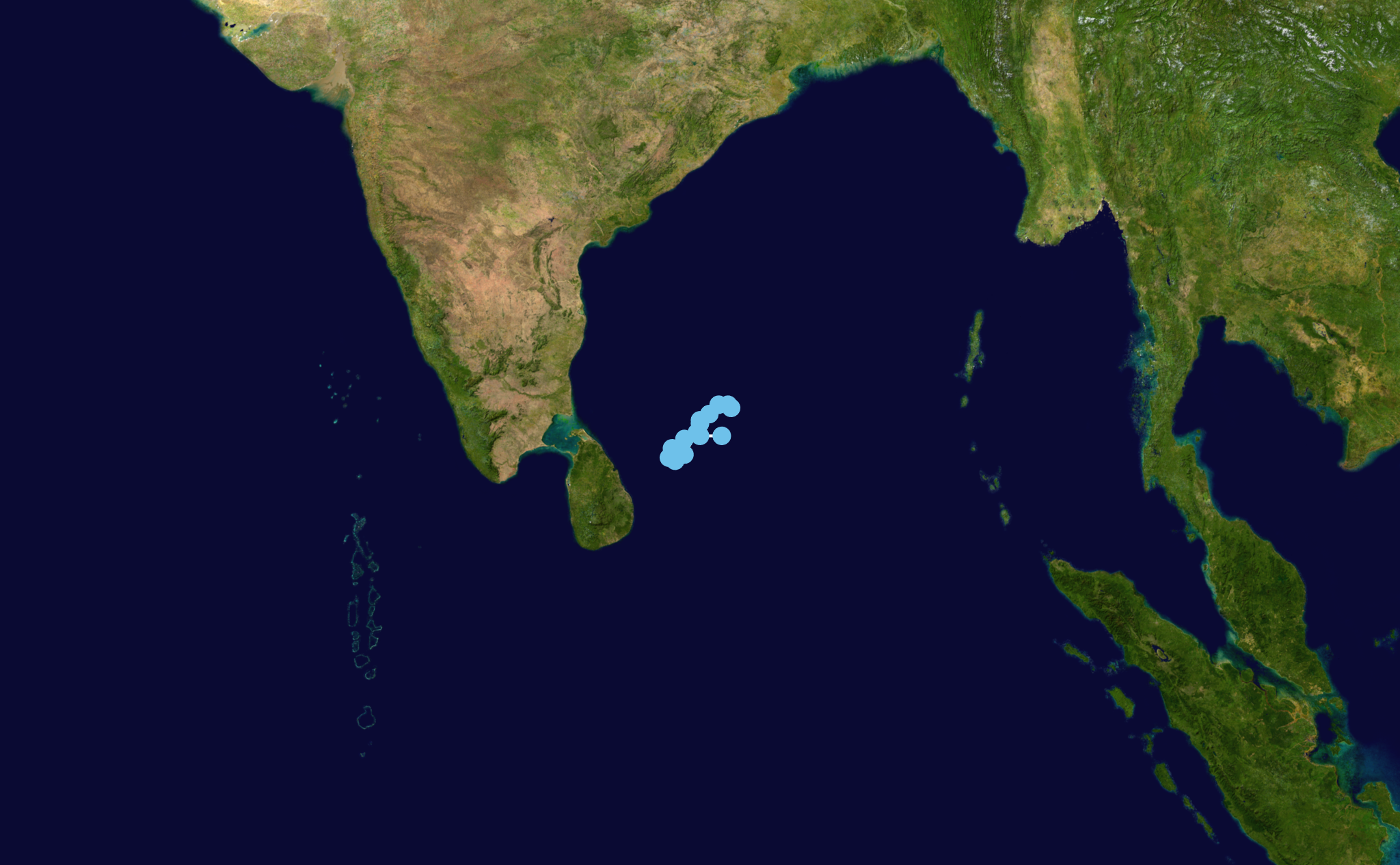
- Duration: November 16 – November 20
- Peak intensity: 55 km/h (35 mph) (3-min);

The last storm of the season was a slow moving depression that formed over the Bay of Bengal, northeast of Sri Lanka. It meandered in the same general area for four days before dissipating.

=== Other systems ===
- A depression formed in the Bay of Bengal on June 20, with the designation BOB 03. It dissipated after only a few hours.
- Brief depression formed over the Bay of Bengal before dissipating just north of Sri Lanka the same day. It was designated as BOB 08.

== See also ==
- North Indian Ocean tropical cyclone
- 1989 Atlantic hurricane season
- 1989 Pacific hurricane season
- 1989 Pacific typhoon season
- Australian cyclone seasons: 1988–89, 1989–90
- South Pacific cyclone seasons: 1988–89, 1989–90
- South-West Indian Ocean cyclone seasons: 1988–89, 1989–90
