= Cyclone Alibera =

South-West Indian tropical cyclone in 1989

Tropical Cyclone Alibera
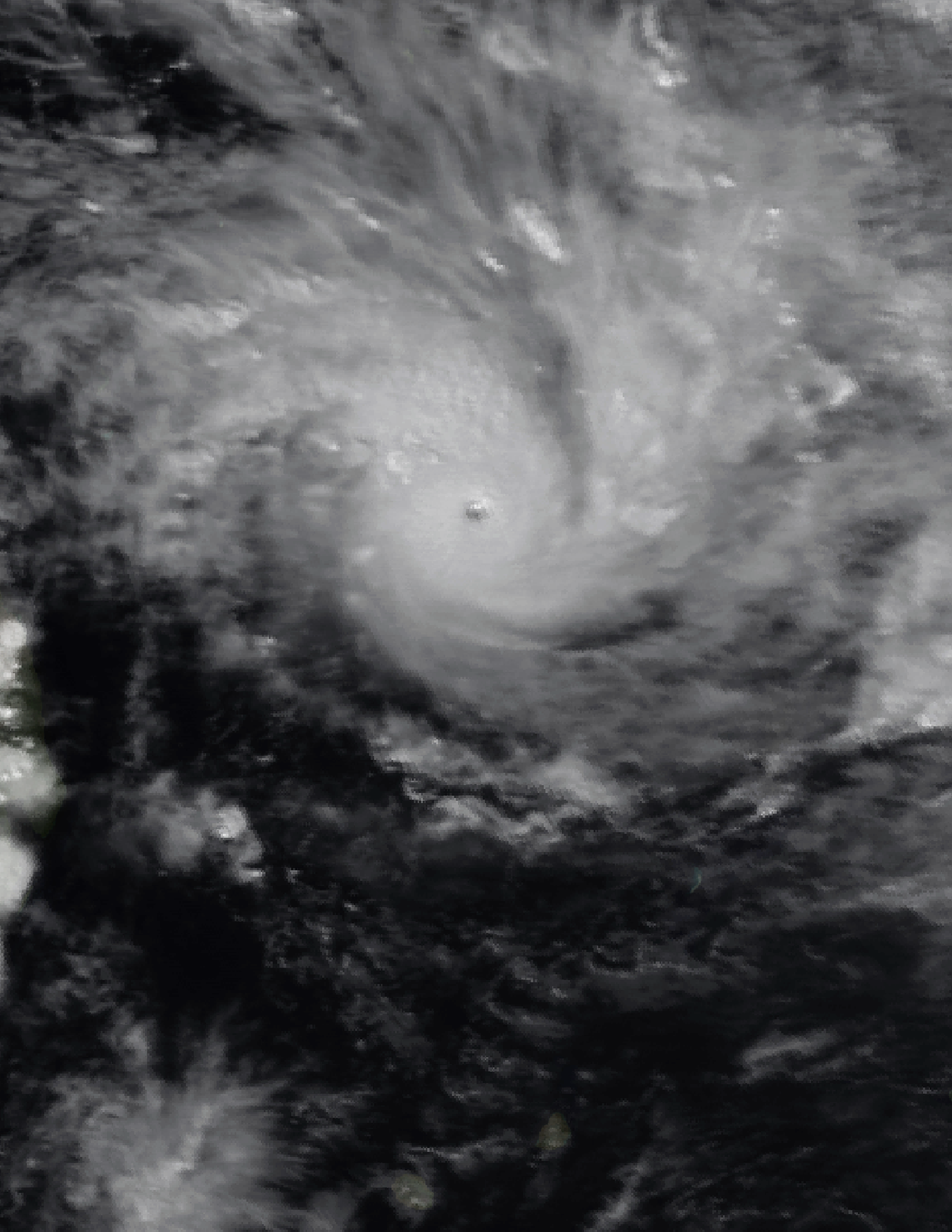
- Satellite image of Cyclone Alibera near peak intensity

Meteorological history
- Formed: December 16, 1989
- Dissipated: January 5, 1990

Tropical cyclone
- 10-minute sustained (MFR)
- Highest winds: 140 km/h (85 mph)
- Lowest pressure: 954 hPa (mbar); 28.17 inHg

Category 4-equivalent tropical cyclone
- 1-minute sustained (SSHWS/JTWC)
- Highest winds: 250 km/h (155 mph)

Overall effects
- Fatalities: 46 overall
- Areas affected: Madagascar
- IBTrACS
- Part of the 1989–90 South-West Indian Ocean cyclone season

Tropical Cyclone Alibera was the third longest-lasting tropical cyclone on record in the south-west Indian Ocean, with a duration of 22 days. It formed on December 16, 1989, well to the northeast of Madagascar. For several days, it meandered southwestward while gradually intensifying. On December 20, Alibera intensified to tropical cyclone status with 10‑minute maximum sustained winds of 120 km/h (75 mph), or the equivalent of a minimal hurricane. That day, the Météo-France office in Réunion (MFR) estimated 10‑minute winds of 140 km/h (87 mph), while the Joint Typhoon Warning Center (JTWC), an unofficial warning agency for the region, estimated peak 1‑minute winds of 250 km/h (160 mph). After drifting erratically for several days, the storm began a steady southwest motion on December 29 as a greatly weakened system. On January 1, Alibera struck southeastern Madagascar near Mananjary, having re-intensified to just below tropical cyclone status. It weakened over land but again restrengthened upon reaching open waters on January 3. The storm turned to the southeast, then to the southwest, and finally back to the southeast, dissipating on January 5.

Early in its duration, Alibera produced gusty winds in the Seychelles. Upon moving ashore in Madagascar, the cyclone lashed coastal cities with heavy rainfall and up to 250-km/h (150-mph) wind gusts. In Mananjary, nearly every building was damaged or destroyed, and locals considered it the worst storm since 1925. Across the region, the cyclone destroyed large areas of crops, thousands of houses, and several roads and bridges. Alibera killed 46 people and left 55,346 people homeless. After the storm, the Malagasy government requested international assistance.

== Meteorological history ==
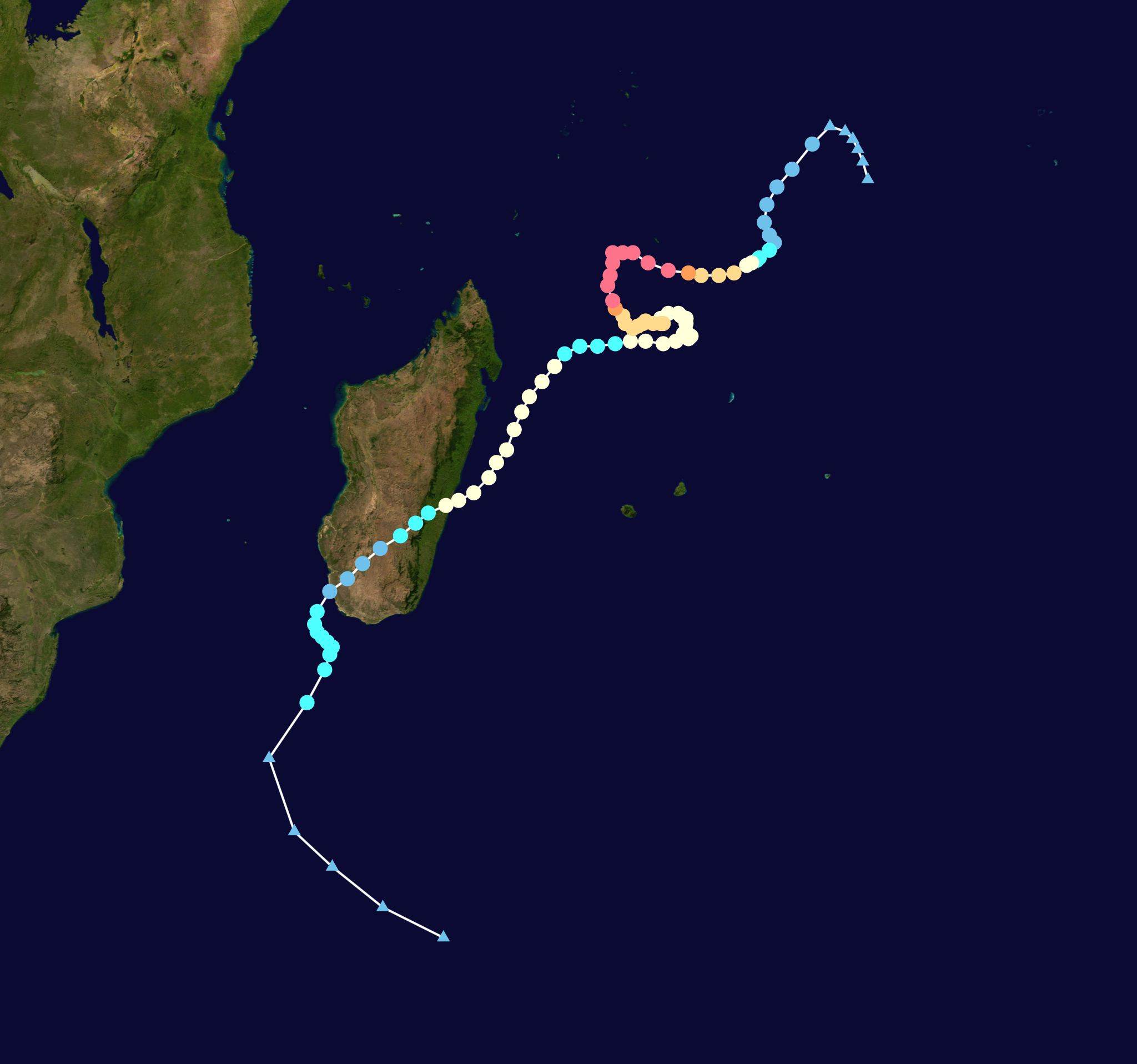
Map plotting the storm's track and intensity, according to the Saffir–Simpson scale Map key Saffir–Simpson scale Tropical depression (≤38 mph, ≤62 km/h) Tropical storm (39–73 mph, 63–118 km/h) Category 1 (74–95 mph, 119–153 km/h) Category 2 (96–110 mph, 154–177 km/h) Category 3 (111–129 mph, 178–208 km/h) Category 4 (130–156 mph, 209–251 km/h) Category 5 (≥157 mph, ≥252 km/h) Unknown Storm type Tropical cyclone Subtropical cyclone Extratropical cyclone, remnant low, tropical disturbance, or monsoon depression

The first named storm of the season, Tropical Cyclone Alibera, formed on December 16 about halfway between Tromelin Island and Diego Garcia as a tropical disturbance. It originated from the Intertropical Convergence Zone and initially consisted of a spiral area of thunderstorms. The system moved erratically, first to the southwest, then to the southeast, and later curving back to the west, steered by a ridge to the southeast. On December 18, the Météo-France office in Réunion (MFR) estimated that the system attained winds of 65 km/h (40 mph), making it a moderate tropical storm. The MFR is the official Regional Specialized Meteorological Center for the basin. As a result, the Mauritius Meteorological Service named the storm Alibera. Also on December 18, the Joint Typhoon Warning Center (JTWC), a joint United States Navy and Air Force task force issuing cyclone warnings for the region, assessed that the storm had winds equivalent to a minimal hurricane in a post-storm analysis. While the storm was active, however, the JTWC did not begin advisories until the following day.

Alibera quickly intensified, attaining tropical cyclone status on December 20 while southwest of Agaléga. Although the MFR estimated 10‑minute winds of 140 km/h (87 mph) that day, the JTWC assessed that the storm was vastly stronger, estimating peak 1‑minute winds of 250 km/h (160 mph). This is equivalent to a super typhoon, which made Alibera tied for the strongest cyclone in the southern hemisphere that season, along with Cyclone Alex in the Australian basin. On December 21, Alibera turned sharply to the south and slowly weakened. On the next day, the storm curved to an eastward drift as a downgraded severe tropical storm, its path influenced by ridges to the east and west. It maintained its intensity for the next several days, turning back to the south on December 24 and slowly recurving to the west. However, the movement was erratic, and the storm executed four small loops. Although the MFR had forecasting difficulties during this time, the storm remained far enough to the north of the Mascarene Islands to limit rainfall warnings.

On December 29, Alibera began a steady track to the southwest after the ridge weakened, and briefly deteriorated to minimal tropical storm status. However, it re-intensified to just shy of tropical cyclone status on January 1. Shortly thereafter, Alibera made landfall north of Mananjary in southeastern Madagascar, at 3 a.m. local time on New Year's Day, with 10‑minute winds of 115 km/h (71 mph). The storm quickly weakened over land, but again restrengthened upon reaching the Mozambique Channel on January 3. This was short-lived, as Alibera weakened back to tropical depression status by January 5. The storm moved to the southeast, turned to the southwest, and finally back to the southeast before dissipating on January 7, having been swept into the westerlies.

Alibera was the second longest-lasting tropical cyclone in the basin since the start of satellite imagery by the time it had dissipated, with a duration of 22 days. Cyclone Georgette in 1968 lasted longer at 24 days. After Alibera, the only storm to approach Alibera's duration until Cyclone Freddy, was Cyclone Leon–Eline in 2000, which lasted 21 days in the basin (29 days overall).

== Impact and aftermath ==
Before Alibera affected Madagascar, it produced winds of tropical cyclone force in the Seychelles. On Tromelin Island, Alibera produced sustained winds of 83 km/h (52 mph) with gusts to 124 km/h (77 mph).

In Mananjary where the cyclone moved ashore, Alibera produced gusts of 250 km/h (160 mph). There, nearly every building was damaged or destroyed, including hospitals, government offices, and schools. About 80% of houses were destroyed. The cyclone shut down the city's water system, disrupted access to the ocean, cut communications, and blocked or damaged most roads. There were 15 deaths in Mananjary alone. The storm damage in Mananjary prevented ships from delivering supplies. Residents in the region considered the storm to be the worst since 1925.

Elsewhere in southern Madagascar, the cyclone damaged about 70% of the buildings in Nosy Varika and 15% of Ivohibe. In the former town, many schools and houses were destroyed, leaving thousands homeless, and 4,230 houses were destroyed in Vohipeno. Strong winds damaged walls and roofs in several other towns in Fianarantsoa Province. The offshore island of Île Sainte-Marie sustained heavy damage. Across Fianarantsoa Province, Alibera destroyed 33,065 ha (81,710 acres) of rice, corn, coffee, bananas, and vegetables, although most of the damage was to the rice crop. The cyclone also wrecked about 10,000 ha (25,000 acres) of cotton and tobacco fields in Ihosy, and downed many trees along its path. Areas in southeastern Madagascar experienced heavy rainfall, which flooded rivers and canals in Fianarantsoa Province. Across the region, 23 roads were cut or damaged, totaling 19.5 km (12.1 mi) of roads in need of repairs. This included a 500 m (1,600 ft) portion of a mountain road that was destroyed, as well as a damaged section of Route nationale 7. In Vohipeno, the floods destroyed 13 bridges, and a bridge was damaged in Ifanadiana. The cyclone also cut a portion of the Fianarantsoa-Côte Est railway, thus disrupting regional economic activity. Across Madagascar, Alibera killed 46 people and left 55,346 homeless.

On January 18, the Malagasy government issued an appeal to the international community for assistance. The Office of the United Nations Disaster Relief Coordinator provided $15,000 (USD) in emergency funding to purchase immediate supplies. The United States sent $20,000 to rebuild schools and hospitals. Other countries donated $135,000 in supplies or cash, including $82,000 from Japan and $23,000 from the United Kingdom. In Mananjary, the local government provided 300 kg (660 lb) of rice to affected families, while the national government provided other relief goods to the city after roads were cleared. After the storm, a school in Farafangana housed 900 locals who were left homeless. Existing food supplies were sufficient to feed affected residents after the storm passed.

== See also ==
- Cyclone Gretelle – Powerful cyclone that struck a similar part of Madagascar in 1997
