= 1990 North Indian Ocean cyclone season =

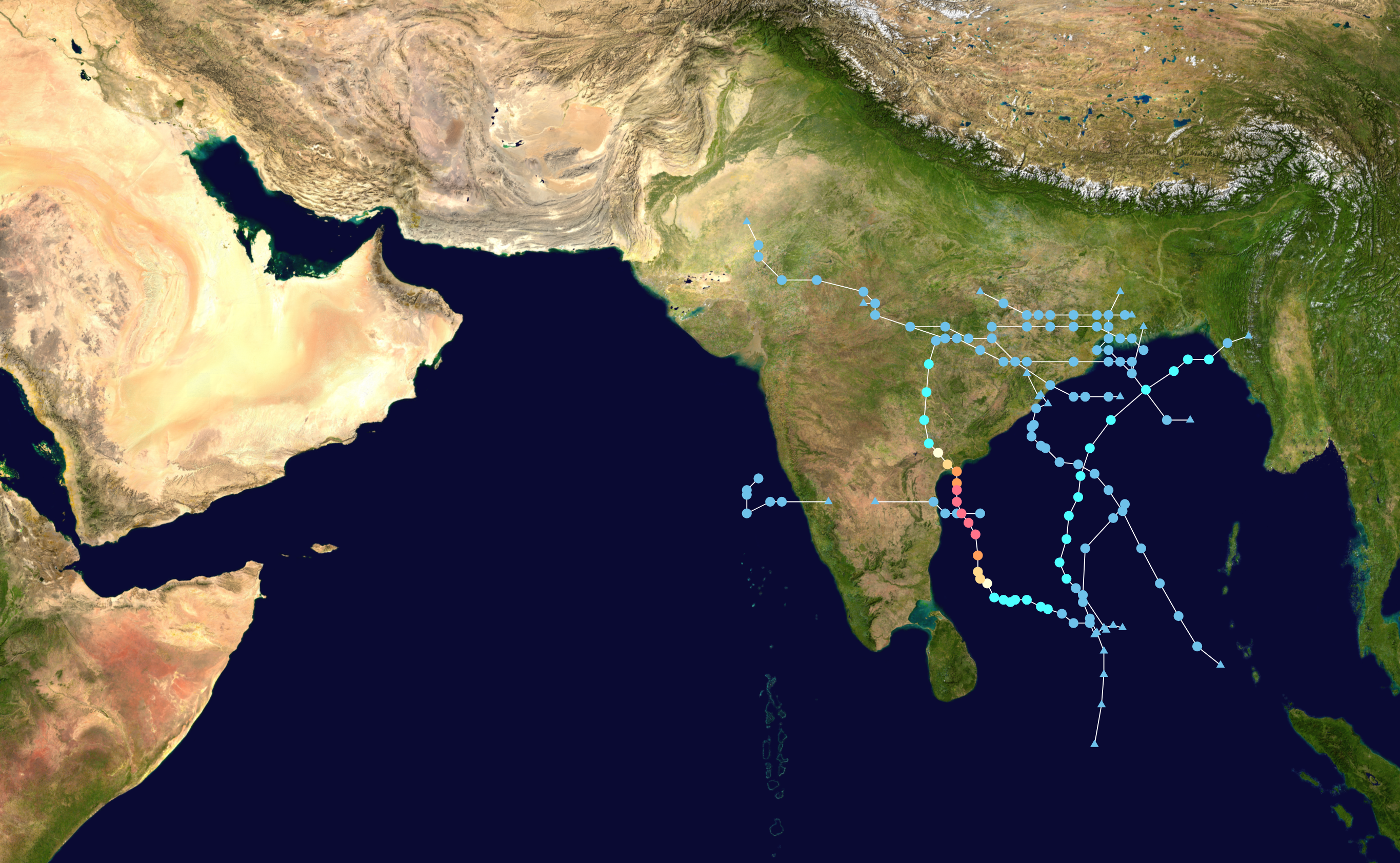
- Season summary map

Seasonal boundaries
- First system formed: April 18, 1990
- Last system dissipated: December 19, 1990

Strongest storm
- Name: BOB 01
  - Maximum winds: 235 km/h (145 mph) (3-minute sustained)
  - Lowest pressure: 920 hPa (mbar)

Seasonal statistics
- Depressions: 11 official, 1 unofficial
- Deep depressions: 6
- Cyclonic storms: 2
- Severe cyclonic storms: 2
- Very severe cyclonic storms: 1
- Super cyclonic storms: 1
- Total fatalities: 1,577 total
- Total damage: $600 million (1990 USD)

Related articles
- 1990 Atlantic hurricane season; 1990 Pacific hurricane season; 1990 Pacific typhoon season

The 1990 North Indian Ocean cyclone season featured a below average total of eleven depressions and one of the most intense tropical cyclones in the basin on record. During the season the systems were primarily monitored by the India Meteorological Department, while other warning centres such as the United States Joint Typhoon Warning Center also monitored the area. During the season, there were at least 1,577 deaths, while the systems caused over US$693 million in damages. The most significant system was the 1990 Andhra Pradesh cyclone, which was the most intense, damaging, and the deadliest system of the season.

== Season summary ==
The 1990 season was a below-average season which featured a total of twelve cyclonic disturbances were recorded during the year, by the India Meteorological Department (IMD) and Joint Typhoon Warning Center (JTWC). (Note: On average sixteen cyclonic disturbances and Six tropical cyclones develop during the year.) (Note: The India Meteorological Department is the official Regional Specialized Meteorological Center for the North Indian Ocean.) (Note: The Joint Typhoon Warning Center is a joint United States Navy – United States Air Force task force that issues tropical cyclone warnings for the North Indian Ocean and other regions.) This included ten systems in the Bay of Bengal and two systems over the Arabian Sea and Bangladesh. Two of the disturbances developed further over the Bay of Bengal and became cyclonic storms, while for the fifth year in a row there were no cyclonic storms over the Arabian Sea. The first disturbance of the season was briefly monitored by the JTWC between April 18 – 19, before the second system of the season developed over the Bay of Bengal during May 4. The system subsequently intensified further and became the strongest tropical cyclone of the season, before it made landfall in southern Andhra Pradesh during May 9. After the system was last noted on May 11, a land depression was monitored over Bangladesh during May 15, while four other systems including the remnant depression of Typhoon Becky were monitored by the IMD during the monsoon season. After the monsoon had withdrawn from India, two deep depressions and a depression were monitored as they impacted the Bay of Bengal, India and Bangladesh, while a depression was monitored over the Arabian Sea. The second and final Cyclonic Storm of the year developed over the Bay of Bengal and affected Bangladesh and Myanmar (Burma) during December.

The Andhra Pradesh cyclone of May caused considerable damage to properties and was responsible for 967 deaths. However, the cyclone warnings issued by the IMD were greatly appreciated by the Public and Government, as they helped to restrict the death to under 1000 people and prompted the state governments to evacuate a large population from coastal areas. The other cyclonic storm of the year caused some damage to properties and deaths in Bangladesh and Myanmar, while the ten depressions all brought rain to the region with two causing over 200 deaths each. During the year a strong south-west monsoon was observed, which produced heavy rain and lead to flooding in India, Bangladesh and Myanmar.

== Systems ==
=== Super Cyclonic Storm BOB 01/02B ===
- Super cyclonic storm (IMD)
- Category 4 tropical cyclone (SSHWS)
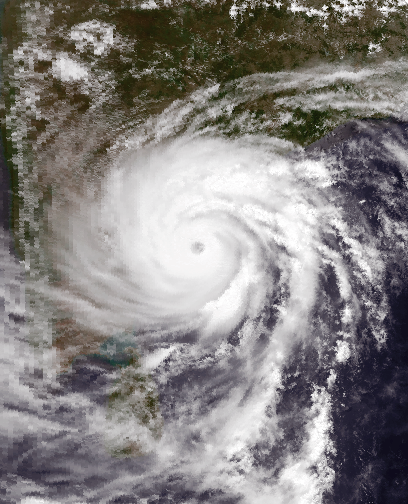
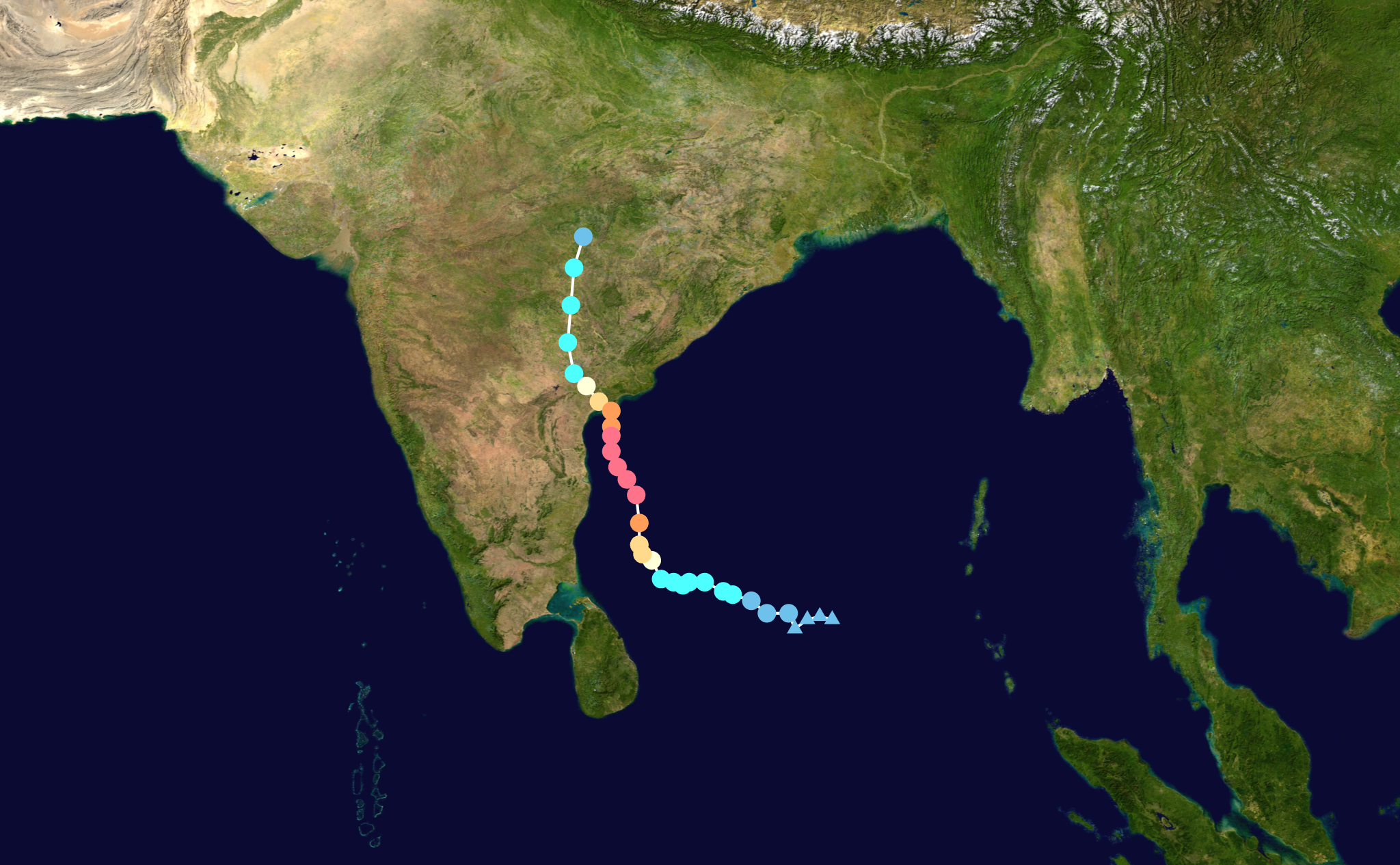
- Duration: May 4 – May 10
- Peak intensity: 235 km/h (145 mph) (3-min); 920 hPa (mbar)

On May 4, the IMD reported that a tropical depression had developed over the Bay of Bengal, about 600 km (375 mi) to the southeast of Chennai, India. During that day the system gradually developed further as it moved westwards under the influence of the subtropical ridge of high pressure. The depression subsequently became a cyclonic storm early on May 5, before the JTWC initiated advisories on the system and designated it as Tropical Cyclone 02B later that day. The system subsequently started to move north-westwards because of a weakness in the subtropical ridge, as it continued to intensify and became a very severe cyclonic storm during May 6. Over the next couple of days the system rapidly intensified before the JTWC reported early on May 8, that the system had peaked with 1-minute sustained windspeeds of 230 km/h (145 mph), which made the system equivalent to a category 4 hurricane on the Saffir–Simpson hurricane wind scale. At around the same time the IMD reported that the cyclone had peaked as a Super Cyclonic Storm with 3-minute sustained wind speeds of 235 km/h (145 mph). The system subsequently started to weaken and had become a very severe cyclonic storm, by the time it made landfall in southern Andhra Pradesh during May 9. The system subsequently moved north-westwards and gradually weakened further, before it was last noted during May 11.

Massive evacuation efforts were placed for this cyclone, resulting in 150,000 people leaving the coastline. Strong flooding still caused 510 human fatalities, but the effect on agriculture was substantial. More than 100,000 animals were killed, and crop damage was estimated at $600 million (1990 USD). This was the worst Indian cyclone since 1977.

=== Deep Depression BOB 07/03B ===
- Deep depression (IMD)
- Tropical depression (SSHWS)
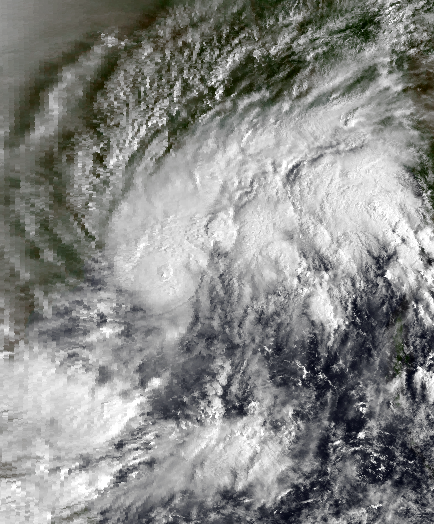
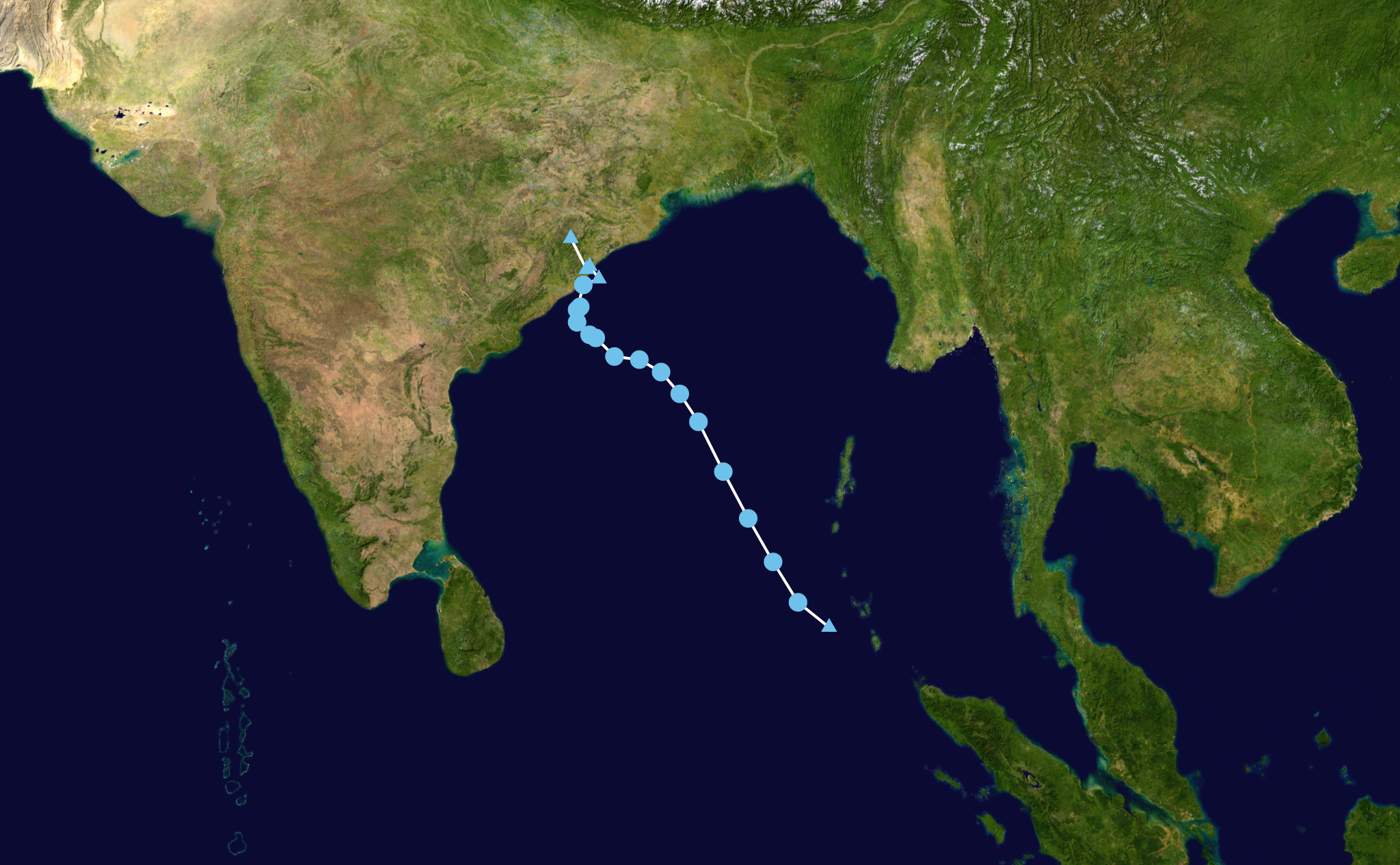
- Duration: October 31 – November 4
- Peak intensity: 55 km/h (35 mph) (3-min); 1001 hPa (mbar)

During October 31, the IMD reported that a depression had developed, out of an area of low pressure over the southern Bay of Bengal. The depression subsequently moved towards the northwest and developed into a Deep Depression during November 1, before the JTWC initiated advisories on the system and designated it as Tropical Cyclone 03B early the next day. The system continued to move towards the northwest along the western subtropical ridge of high pressure, before it made landfall on southern Odisha during November 3. The system subsequently dissipated over land during November 4. The system caused heavy rainfall over Southern Odisha, which led to flash flooding, dams and reservoirs overflowing and over US$110 million worth damage to property and crops. 250 deaths were also recorded in conjunction with this system.

=== Severe Cyclonic Storm BOB 09/04B ===
- Severe cyclonic storm (IMD)
- Tropical storm (SSHWS)
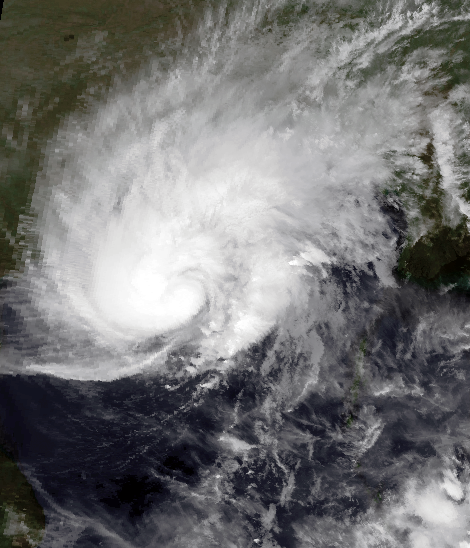
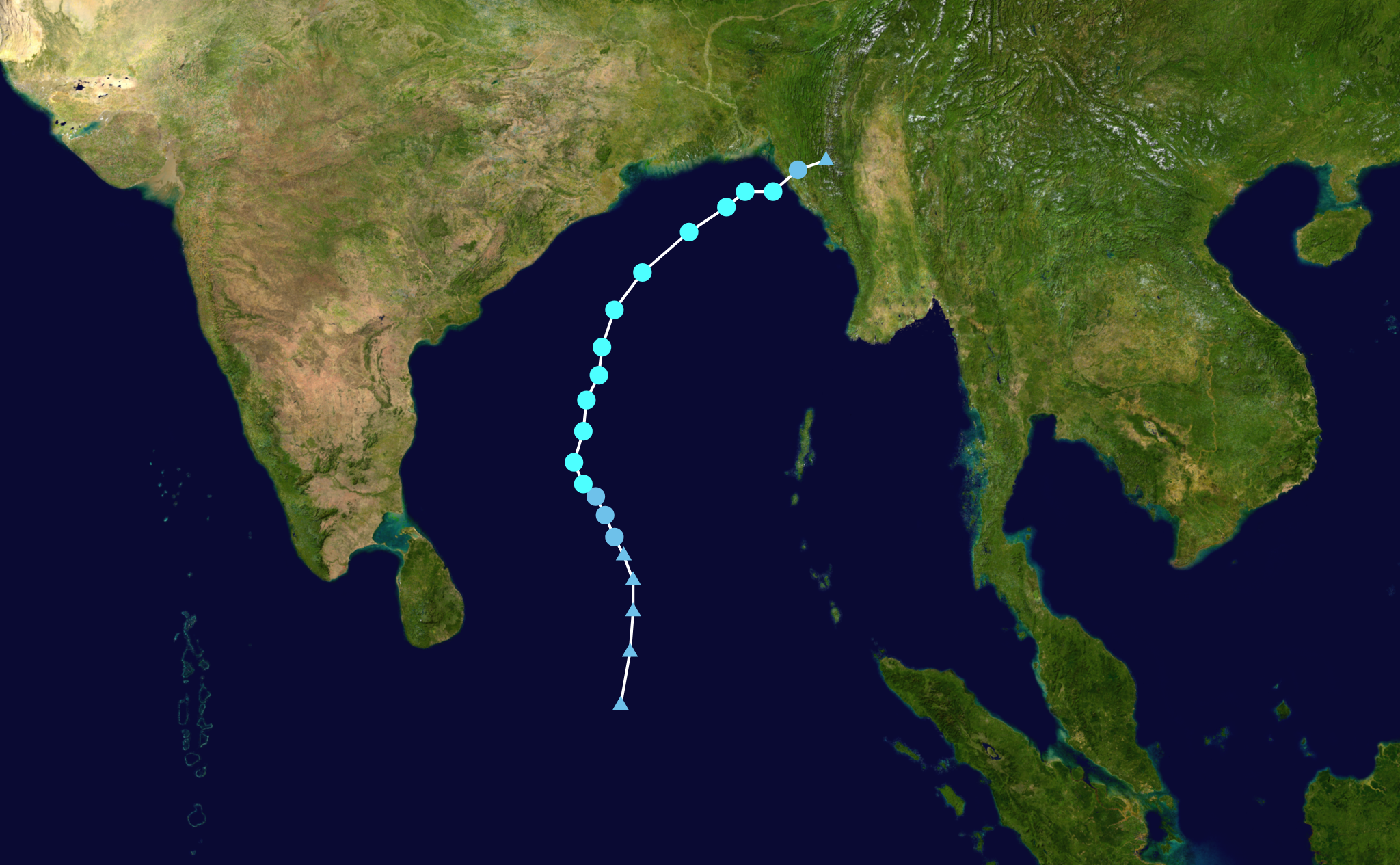
- Duration: December 14 – December 19
- Peak intensity: 100 km/h (65 mph) (3-min);

On December 14, the IMD reported that a depression had developed within the Intertropical Convergence Zone over the southern Bay of Bengal. Over the next day the system moved north-westwards and gradually developed into a cyclonic storm, as the JTWC initiated advisories on the depression and assigned it the designation Tropical Cyclone 04B. The system subsequently continued to intensify, as it recurved and moved through a break in the subtropical ridge of high pressure. Late on December 16, the JTWC reported that the cyclone had peaked as a tropical storm, with 1-minute wind speeds of 85 km/h (55 mph). Early on December 17, the IMD reported that the system had peaked as a Severe Cyclonic Storm with 3-minute wind speeds of 100 km/h (60 mph). The system subsequently started to weaken later that day, as it encountered increasing upper-level wind shear associated with the mid-latitude westerlies. During the next day the system weakened into a Cyclonic Storm, before it degenerated into a depression. The system subsequently made landfall on Bangladesh near Cox's Bazar, before it was last noted over Myanmar by the JTWC during December 19. The system caused some deaths and damages in both Bangladesh and Myanmar.

=== Other systems ===
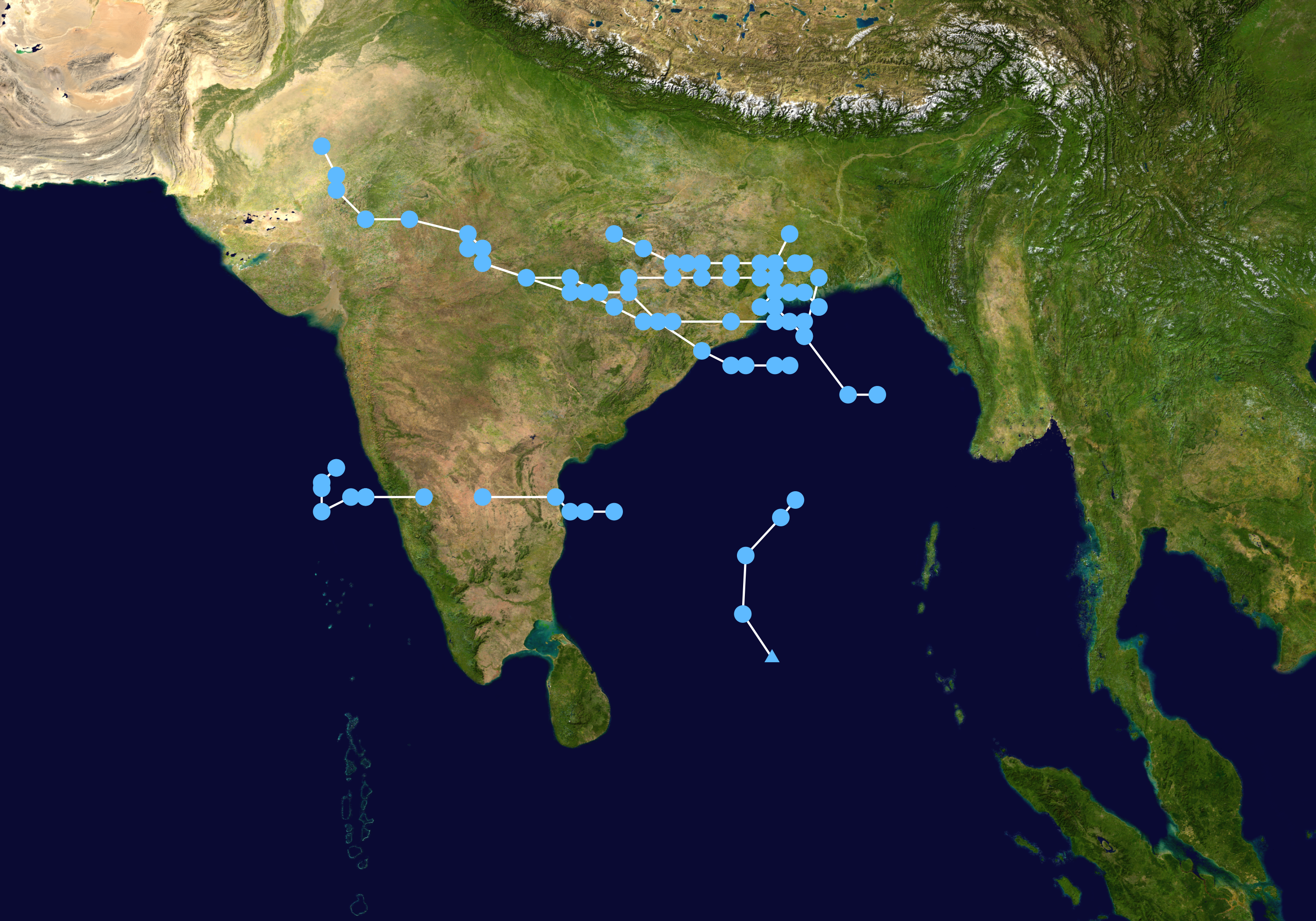
Track summary of tropical depressions

On April 17, an area of atmospheric convection developed within the Bay of Bengal to the east of Sri Lanka. During that day the system started to rapidly organise itself as it moved northwards, which prompted the JTWC to issue a Tropical Cyclone Formation Alert on the system. The JTWC subsequently initiated advisories on the system and assigned it the designation Tropical Cyclone 01B. Strong upper-level westerlies inhibited development of the depression and brought about the rapid dissipation of the system while it was located over water during April 18. A land depression was monitored over Bangladesh by the IMD during May 15. During the onset phase of the south-west monsoon on June 13, the IMD reported that a depression had developed had formed over the north-western Bay of Bengal. Over the next day the system moved north-westwards and made landfall on the Indian state of Odisha early on June 14. The system subsequently intensified into a Deep Depression while located over land near Jamshedpur, before as it moved north-westwards it weakened and dissipated over Madhya Pradesh during June 15.

On August 14, the IMD reported that a depression had developed out of a pre existing disturbance, that was embedded within the monsoon trough over the Bay of Bengal. Over the next day the system moved towards the northwest and made landfall on the coast of northern Andhra Pradesh and southern Odisha during August 15. The depression subsequently continued to move west-northwest as a land depression, before it dissipated over Madhya Pradesh during August 17. Early on August 20, the IMD reported that a Depression had developed over the northern Bay of Bengal and was embedded within a deep easterly flow of an anticyclone. The system subsequently moved north-westward and made landfall near Paradip on Odisha during the next day. After landfall the system continued to move north-westwards as a land depression, before it dissipated over Rajasthan during August 25. On September 1, the remnants of Typhoon Becky crossed the coast of Bangladesh, and moved into the Indian state of West Bengal as an area of low pressure. Over the next couple of days the system moved westwards, before the IMD reported that it had developed into a Depression during September 3. Over the next couple of days the system remained weak before it rapidly dissipated during September 5.

During the withdrawal phase of the south-west monsoon on October 7, the IMD reported that a depression had developed over the northern Bay of Bengal. During that day the system moved north-westwards and made landfall on the coast of Odisha and West Bengal as a Deep Depression. The system subsequently came under the influence of a westerly trough of low pressure and recurved towards the northeast, before it dissipated over West Bengal during October 9. 370 deaths were recorded in Bangladesh in association with this system, while a storm surge affected Chittagong and caused extensive damage to two offshore islands. A search and rescue operation was launched after 350 boats and trawlers failed to return to port and 5000 fishermen failed to return to port after the system. On November 14, the IMD reported that a depression had developed out of a pre existing disturbance, that was located over the south-west Bay of Bengal near the Tamil Nadu Coast. During that day the system moved westwards and made landfall on the Northern Tamil Nadu and Southern Andhra Pradesh coasts before it rapidly weakened into an area of low pressure. The remnants subsequently crossed the Indian Peninsular and emerged into the Arabian Sea during November 16, before they intensified into a Deep Depression during November 17. The system subsequently recurved towards the northeast, before the system dissipated over the sea during November 18.

== Season effects ==
Name	Dates	Peak intensity			Areas affected	Damage (USD)	Deaths	Ref(s).
Name	Dates	Category	Wind speed	Pressure	Areas affected	Damage (USD)	Deaths	Ref(s).
01B	April 17–18	Depression	45 km/h (30 mph)	1,004 hPa (29.65 inHg)	None	None	None	
BOB 01/02B	May 4–11	Super cyclonic storm	235 km/h (145 mph)	920 hPa (27.17 inHg)	Tamil Nadu, Andrah Pradesh	$580 million	957	
Land	May 15	Land Depression	45 km/h (30 mph)	Not specified	Bangladesh	Unknown	Unknown	
BOB 02	June 13–15	Deep Depression	55 km/h (35 mph)	990 hPa (29.23 inHg)	Odisha, Jharkhand, Madhya Pradesh	Unknown	Unknown	
BOB 03	August 14–17	Depression	45 km/h (30 mph)	993 hPa (29.32 inHg)	Andhra Pradesh, Odisha, Madhya Pradesh	Unknown	Unknown	
BOB 04	August 20–24	Depression	45 km/h (30 mph)	986 hPa (29.12 inHg)	Odisha, Rajasthan	Unknown	Unknown	
BOB 05	September 3–5	Depression	45 km/h (30 mph)	986 hPa (29.12 inHg)	Bangladesh, West Bengal	Unknown	Unknown	
BOB 06	October 6–9	Deep Depression	55 km/h (35 mph)	998 hPa (29.47 inHg)	Odisha, West Bengal, Bangladesh	Extensive	370	
BOB 07/03B	October 31 – November 4	Deep Depression	55 km/h (35 mph)	1,001 hPa (29.56 inHg)	Odisha	$113 million	250	
BOB 08	November 14	Depression	45 km/h (30 mph)	1,008 hPa (29.77 inHg)	Tamil Nadu, Andhra Pradesh	Unknown	Unknown	
ARB 01	November 16–18	Deep Depression	55 km/h (35 mph)	1,007 hPa (29.74 inHg)	None	Unknown	Unknown	
BOB 09/04B	December 14–19	Severe cyclonic storm	100 km/h (60 mph)	Not specified	Bangladesh, Myanmar	Unknown	Unknown	
Season aggregates
12 systems	April 17 – December 18		235 km/h (145 mph)	920 hPa (27.17 inHg)		$693 million	1577	

== See also ==
- North Indian Ocean tropical cyclone
- 1990 Atlantic hurricane season
- 1990 Pacific hurricane season
- 1990 Pacific typhoon season
- South-West Indian Ocean cyclone season: 1989–90, 1990–91
- Australian region cyclone season: 1989–90, 1990–91
- South Pacific cyclone season: 1989–90, 1990–91
