= 1990 Andhra Pradesh cyclone =

Category 4 North Indian tropical cyclone in 1990

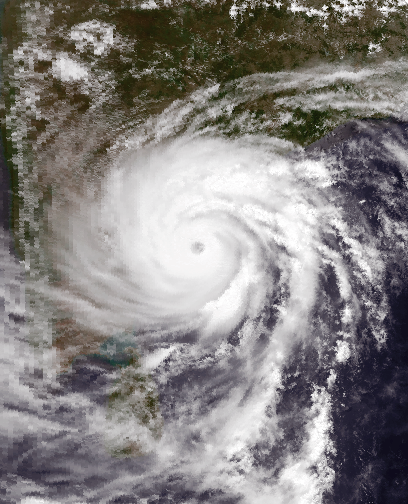
- 1990 Andhra Pradesh cyclone on May 8

Meteorological history
- Formed: 4 May 1990
- Dissipated: 10 May 1990

Super cyclonic storm
- 3-minute sustained (IMD)
- Highest winds: 235 km/h (145 mph)
- Lowest pressure: 920 hPa (mbar); 27.17 inHg

Category 4-equivalent tropical cyclone
- 1-minute sustained (SSHWS/JTWC)
- Highest winds: 230 km/h (145 mph)
- Lowest pressure: 916 hPa (mbar); 27.05 inHg

Overall effects
- Fatalities: 967
- Areas affected: India
- IBTrACS
- Part of the 1990 North Indian Ocean cyclone season

The 1990 Andhra Pradesh cyclone was the worst disaster to affect Southern India since the 1977 Andhra Pradesh cyclone. The system was first noted as a depression on 4 May 1990, while it was located over the Bay of Bengal about 600 km (375 mi) to the southeast of Chennai, India. During the next day the depression intensified into a cyclonic storm and started to intensify rapidly, becoming a super cyclonic storm early on 8 May. The cyclone weakened slightly before it made landfall on India about 300 km (190 mi) to the north of Madras in the Tamil Nadu state as a very severe cyclonic storm with winds of 165 km/h (105 mph). While over land the cyclone gradually dissipated. The cyclone had a severe impact on India, with over 967 people reported to have been killed. Over 100,000 animals also died in the cyclone with the total cost of damages to crops estimated at over $600 million (1990 USD).

== Meteorological history ==
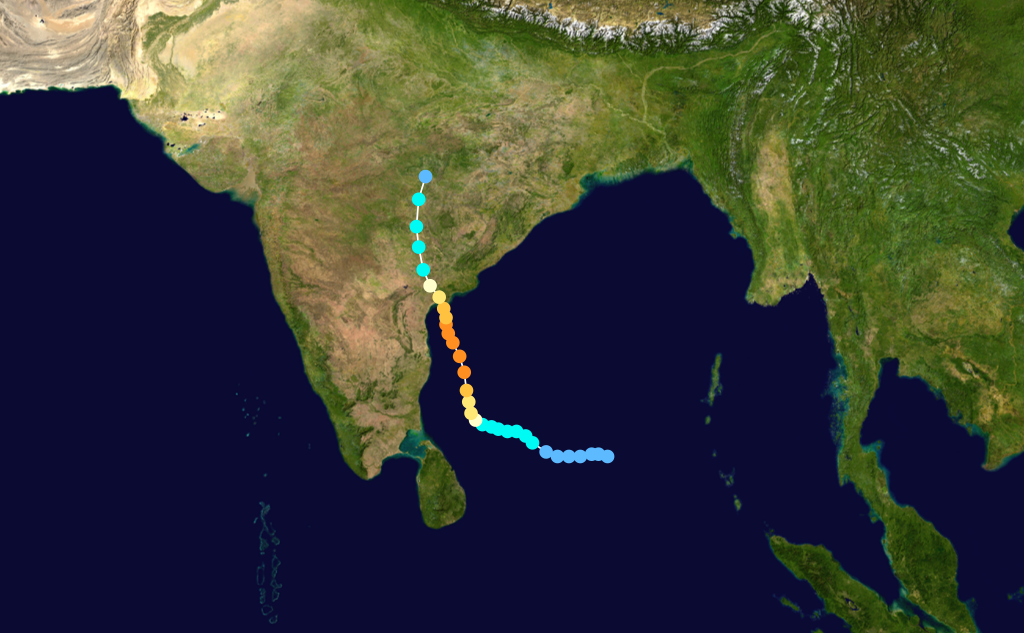
Map plotting the storm's track and intensity, according to the Saffir–Simpson scale Map key Saffir–Simpson scale Tropical depression (≤38 mph, ≤62 km/h) Tropical storm (39–73 mph, 63–118 km/h) Category 1 (74–95 mph, 119–153 km/h) Category 2 (96–110 mph, 154–177 km/h) Category 3 (111–129 mph, 178–208 km/h) Category 4 (130–156 mph, 209–251 km/h) Category 5 (≥157 mph, ≥252 km/h) Unknown Storm type Tropical cyclone Subtropical cyclone Extratropical cyclone, remnant low, tropical disturbance, or monsoon depression

On 4 May 1990, the India Meteorological Department (IMD) reported that a depression had developed over the Bay of Bengal about 600 km (375 mi) to the southeast of Chennai, India. During that day the system gradually developed further and became the subject of a Tropical Cyclone Formation Alert, by the Joint Typhoon Warning Center as it moved westwards under the influence of the subtropical ridge of high pressure. The depression subsequently intensified into a cyclonic storm early the next day, before the JTWC initiated advisories on the system and designated it as Tropical Cyclone 02B later that day. At this stage the JTWC only expected the cyclone to intensify marginally before it weakened as it made landfall in Southern India within 72 hours. During 6 May, the system started to move more towards the north-west because of a weakness in the subtropical ridge, as it continued to intensify and became a Very Severe Cyclonic Storm. This turn towards the northwest turned out to be more northerly than had been expected, which as a result allowed the system to stay offshore for longer than had been expected by the JTWC.

Over the next couple of days the system rapidly intensified before the JTWC reported early on 8 May, that the system had peaked with 1-minute sustained windspeeds of 230 km/h (145 mph), which made the system equivalent to a category 4 hurricane on the Saffir–Simpson hurricane wind scale. At around the same time the IMD also reported that the cyclone had peaked as a Super Cyclonic Storm, with 3-minute sustained wind speeds of 235 km/h (145 mph) and an estimated central pressure of 920 hPa (27.17 inHg). By this time the system was located about 150 km (95 mi) to the northeast of Madras and was moving northwards slowly. Later that day as the ship Visvamohini moved through the systems eye region, it measured a central pressure of 912 hPa (26.93 inHg), which the IMD reported would be one of the lowest central pressures ever measured in the Bay of Bengal if it was correct. The system subsequently weakened and had become a Very Severe Cyclonic Storm by the time it made landfall during 9 May, near the mouth of the Krishna River in southern Andhra Pradesh. The system subsequently moved north-westwards and gradually weakened further, before it was last noted during 11 May, by both the IMD and JTWC.

== Preparations and impact ==
=== Preparations ===
As a result of timely warnings issued by the IMD, the Indian government was able to launch an evacuation campaign and order that all fisherman return to shore. This led to more than 150,000 people being evacuated to relief camps which had been set up on higher ground. Due to the thorough preparations, there was fewer deaths than in the 1977 Andhra Pradesh cyclone.

=== Impact ===
On Edurumondi Island over 7,000 people were left stranded after they refused to evacuate. The island itself was reported to have experienced the full brunt of the system. However, all of the residents reportedly sought protection within a shelter provided by the government. The cyclone had a significant effect on India, with storm surge tides as high as 4.9 meters (16 ft) above normal. Consequently, over 100 villages were submerged in water and destroyed. At least 967 people were killed by the cyclone; most of the deaths occurred when houses made mostly out of mud and straw collapsed. Other people were killed when electrical wires were knocked down and while some people were carried away by flooded rivers. The storm left at least 3 million people homeless, while over 100,000 farm animals were killed. At least 435,000 acres (1,760 km^{2}) of rice paddies were destroyed along with huge tracts of mango and banana trees. The total damage to crops and property was estimated at over $600 million (1990 USD). The cyclone was described as the worst disaster in southern India since the 1977 storm. Sea water contaminated fresh drinking wells, prompting warnings about outbreaks of Cholera and Typhoid as many people were drinking and cooking with water from the drains which was causing stomach disorders.

==== Tamil Nadu ====
Overall the cyclone only caused minor damage to Tamil Nadu with the worst affected area being the district of Chengalpattu, where one of the old shrines of Kasiviswanathar Temple collapsed as high waves hit the coast. A large number of huts were also washed away by the waves, while six deaths were reported in the state.

== Aftermath ==
On 11 May, two days after the cyclone had hit, the Indian Government launched a massive relief and rescue operation. The Indian Army and Naval helicopters took surveys of areas affected by the cyclone, and also dropped food packets. Although the Indian Government did not request international assistance, the Red Cross provided food, oil, medicines and water tanks for the affected families; the Commission on Inter-Church Aid, Refugee and World Service (CICARWS) at the World Council of Churches issued an appeal for $262,000 (1990 USD) so they could provide immediate needs with World Vision providing $160,000 (1990 USD) for food blankets and utensils.

== See also ==
- 1990 North Indian Ocean cyclone season
- 1977 Andhra Pradesh cyclone
