= Timeline of the 1990–91 South Pacific cyclone season =

Timeline of the 1990-91 South Pacific cyclone season
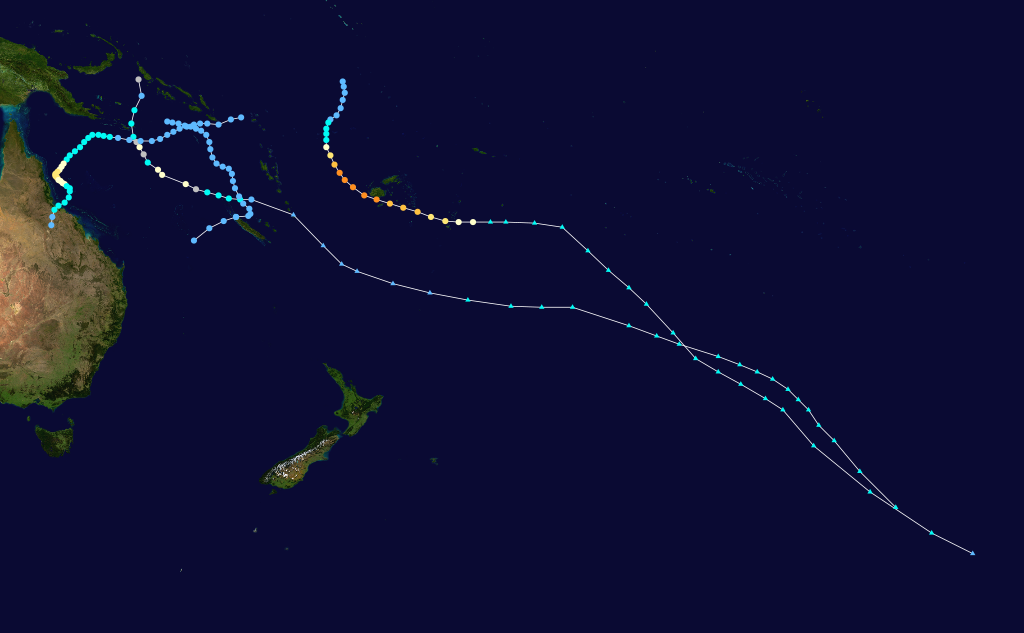
- Season summary map

Season boundaries
- First system formed: November 23, 1990
- Last system dissipated: May 19, 1991

Longest lasting system
- Name: Sina
- Duration: 11 days
Storm articles
- Cyclone Sina
- Cyclone Joy

The 1990–91 South Pacific cyclone season was a below-average season; only two tropical cyclones occurred within the South Pacific to the east of 160°E. (Note: An average season has nine tropical cyclones, about half of which become severe tropical cyclones.) The season officially ran from November 1, 1990, to April 30, 1991, but the first disturbance of the season formed on November 23 and the last dissipated on May 19. (Note: TCWC Nadi warned on systems in the South Pacific, which is located from the equator to 25°S and from 160°E to 120°W. TCWC Wellington warns on systems from 25°S to 40°S and from 160°E to 120°W) This is the period of the year when most tropical cyclones form within the South Pacific Ocean. During the season, no one was killed from tropical disturbances within the South Pacific. However, six people were killed by Cyclone Joy when it made landfall on Australia. The only tropical cyclone to cause any damage while within this basin was Sina, which caused at least $18.5 million (1991 USD) worth of damage to Fiji and Tonga. As a result of the impacts of both Joy and Sina, the names were retired from the tropical cyclone naming lists.

Within the South Pacific, tropical cyclones were monitored by the Tropical Cyclone Warning Centers (TCWC) at the Fiji Meteorological Service in Nadi and by the Meteorological Service of New Zealand Limited in Wellington. Tropical cyclones that moved to the west of 160°E were monitored as a part of the Australian region by the Australian Bureau of Meteorology. Both the United States Joint Typhoon Warning Center (JTWC) and the Naval Western Oceanography Center (NWOC) issued unofficial warnings within the southern Pacific. The JTWC issued warnings between 160°E and the International Date Line, while the NWOC issued warnings for tropical cyclones forming between the International Date Line and the coasts of the Americas. Both the JTWC and the NWOC-designated tropical cyclones with a number and a P suffix with numbers assigned in numerical order to tropical cyclones developing within the whole of the Southern Hemisphere. TCWC Nadi and TCWC Wellington both use the Australian Tropical Cyclone Intensity Scale, and measure windspeeds over ten minutes, while the JTWC and the NWOC measured sustained winds over one minute and use the Saffir–Simpson Hurricane Scale.

This timeline includes information from post-storm reviews by TCWC Nadi, TCWC Wellington, the JTWC, and the NWOC. It documents tropical cyclone formations, strengthenings, weakenings, landfalls, extratropical transitions, and dissipations during the season. Reports among warning centers often differ; therefore, information from all three agencies has been included.

== Seasonal summary ==
As a result of the South Pacific Convergence Zone being both weaker and located further to the north than in previous seasons and the Madden–Julian oscillations being weaker and less regular defined than in previous tropical cyclone seasons. As a result, only three tropical cyclones occurred within the South Pacific basin between 160°E and 120°W, which made the season one of the least active on record. The first tropical cyclone was first noted as a shallow depression on November 20 before it was named Sina on November 24 after it had intensified into a tropical cyclone. After peaking as a category three severe tropical cyclone on the Australian tropical cyclone intensity scale, Sina affected Fiji, Tonga, Niue and the Southern Cook Islands with total damage estimated at over 18.5 million before it was last noted on December 4, as it was absorbed by an advancing trough of low pressure near 50°S. During December 15, the precursor tropical low to Cyclone Joy developed near the Solomon Islands. Over the next two days the system moved westwards, before it moved into the Australian region during December 17. The system was subsequently named Joy on December 19, before it made landfall on Queensland during December 26.

The basin then remained quiet until March when three significant tropical depressions including 15 and 16P were observed within the Coral Sea/Australian region, which did not develop into tropical cyclones but were subject to gale warnings. 15P was first noted on March 3, while it was located about 900 km (560 mi) to the east of the Solomon Islands and over the next couple of days subsequently moved south-westwards and out of the South Pacific basin during the next day. 16P was first noted on March 14, while located about 300 km (185 mi) to the southeast of Honiara in the Solomon Islands. (Note: The figures for maximum sustained winds and position estimates are rounded to the nearest 5 units (miles, or kilometers), following the convention used in the Fiji Meteorological Service's operational products for each storm. All other units are rounded to the nearest digit.) Over the next couple of days the system moved towards the south-east before the JTWC designated the system 16P and initiated advisories on it during March 18 after it had moved into the South Pacific basin. Over the next couple of days the system, moved towards the south-southeast before it turned towards the southwest and passed over New Caledonia on March 20, before it was last noted during the next day moving out of the basin. The final tropical cyclone of the season, Lisa, moved into the Southern Pacific on May 11 at its peak intensity of 110 km/h (75 mph). During the next day as the storm moved towards the subtropical jet, Lisa rapidly weakened into a tropical depression before passing over Anatom Island without causing any significant damage. After the season both the names Sina and Joy were retired from the naming lists for the region, while it was determined that a weak gale force tropical cyclone had affected Tonga between December 14–17.

== Timeline ==
=== November ===
November 1

- 0000 UTC, (1200 FST) – The 1990–91 South Pacific cyclone season officially begins. (Note: UTC stands for Coordinated Universal Time.) (Note: FST stands for Fiji Standard Time, which is equivalent to UTC+12.) (Note: The figures for maximum sustained winds and position estimates are rounded to the nearest 5 units (knots, miles, or kilometers), following the convention used in the Fiji Meteorological Service's operational products for each storm. All other units are rounded to the nearest digit.)

November 24

- 07:15 UTC, (19:15 FST) – TCWC Nadi initiates advisories on a tropical depression, that has developed to the northwest of the Fijian dependency of Rotuma.
- 12:00 UTC, (0000 FST, November 25) – The JTWC designates the tropical depression to the northwest of Rotuma, as Tropical Cyclone 03P with 1-minute sustained wind speeds equivalent to a tropical storm.
- 1910 UTC, (0710 FST, November 25) – TCWC Nadi reports that Tropical Depression 03P, has intensified into a category 1 tropical cyclone and names it Sina.

November 25

- 1800 UTC, (0600 FST, November 26) – TCWC Nadi reports that Tropical Cyclone Sina, has intensified into a category 2 tropical cyclone.

November 26

- 0000 UTC, (1200 FST) – TCWC Nadi reports that Tropical Cyclone Sina (03P) has become a category 3 severe tropical cyclone.
- 0000 UTC, (1200 FST) – The JTWC reports that Tropical Cyclone Sina, has become equivalent to a category 1 tropical cyclone on the SSHWS.
- 0600 UTC, (1800 FST) – The JTWC reports that Tropical Cyclone Sina has intensified further and has become a category 2 hurricane on the SSHWS.

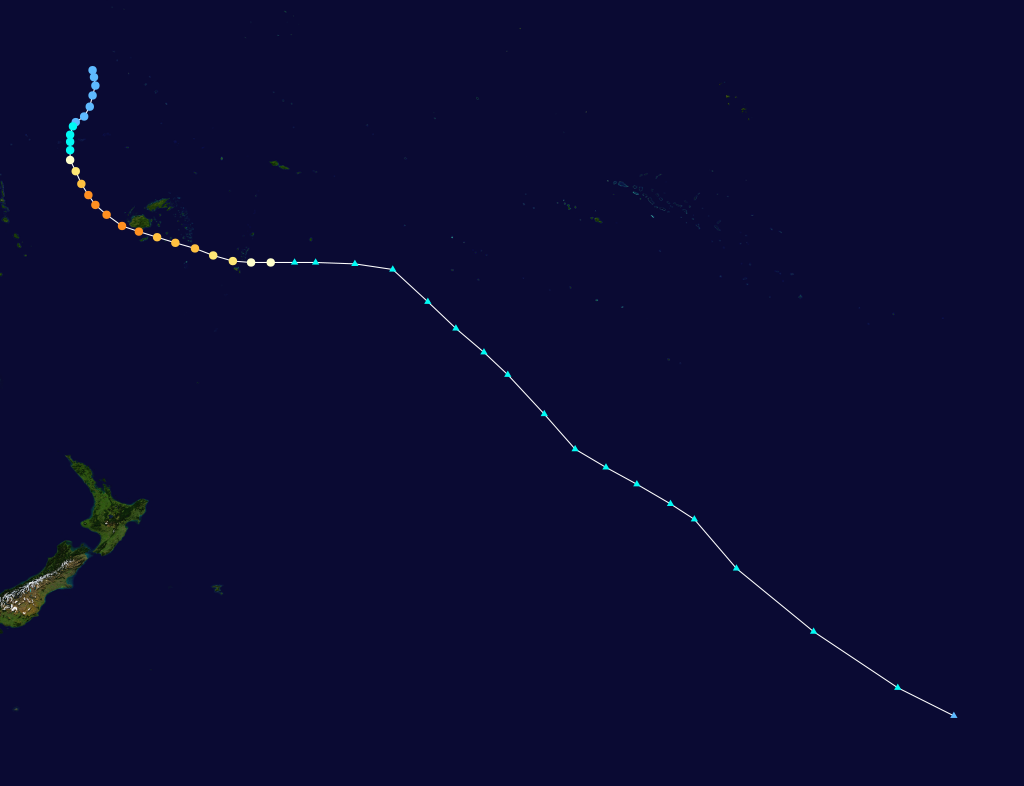
Track map of Severe Tropical Cyclone Sina

- 1200 UTC, (0000 FST, November 27) – The JTWC reports that Tropical Cyclone Sina has intensified further and become equivalent to a category 3 tropical cyclone on the SSHWS.
- 1800 UTC, (0600 FST, November 27) – TCWC Nadi reports that Severe Tropical Cyclone Sina, has reached its peak intensity with 10-minute sustained winds of 140 km/h (85 mph).
- 1800 UTC, (0600 FST, November 27) – The JTWC reports that Tropical Cyclone Sina has intensified further and become equivalent to a category 4 hurricane on the SSHWS.

November 27

- 00:00 UTC, (12:00 FST) – The JTWC reports that Tropical Cyclone Sina has reached its peak intensity, with 1-minute sustained wind speeds of 230 km/h (145 mph).

November 28

- 00:00 UTC, (12:00 FST) – The JTWC issues its final advisory on Tropical Cyclone Sina and transfers the warning responsibility to the NWOC, as the system weakens and becomes equivalent to a category 3 tropical cyclone on the SSHWS.
- 12:00 UTC, (00:00 FST, November 29) – The NWOC issues its first advisory on Tropical Cyclone Sina.
- 18:00 UTC, (06:00 FST, November 29) – The NWOC reports that Tropical Cyclone Sina has weakened and become equivalent to a category 2 tropical cyclone on the SSHWS.

November 29

- 00:00 UTC, (12:00 FST) – TCWC Nadi reports that Severe Tropical Cyclone Sina, has weakened into a category 2 tropical cyclone.
- 06:00 UTC, (18:00 FST) – The NWOC reports that Tropical Cyclone Sina has weakened and become equivalent to a category 1 tropical cyclone on the SSHWS.
- 12:00 UTC, (00:00 FST, November 30) – The NWOC reports that Tropical Cyclone Sina (03P) has degenerated, into an extratropical cyclone and issues its final warning.

November 30

- 19:15 UTC, (07:15 FST, December 1) – TCWC Nadi issues its final advisory on Tropical Cyclone Sina, and passes the primary warning responsibility for the system to TCWC Wellington, as the system moves below 25°S.

=== December ===
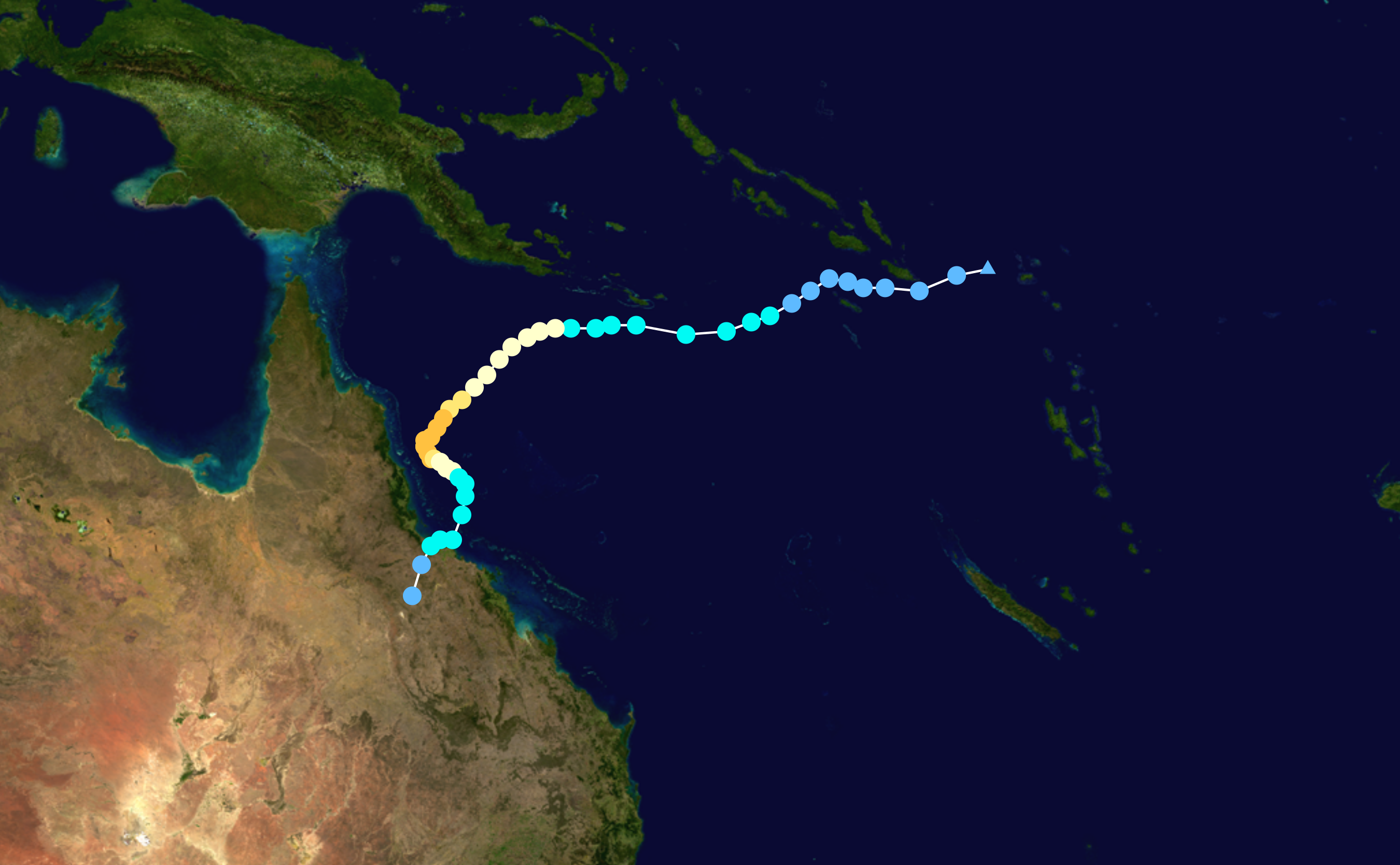
Track map of Severe Tropical Cyclone Joy (06P)

December 1

- 0000 UTC (1200 FST) - TCWC Wellington reports that Tropical Cyclone Sina, has degenerated into an extratropical cyclone.

December 4

- 1800 UTC (0600 FST, December 5) – The extratropical remnants of Tropical Cyclone Sina are last noted by TCWC Wellington, as they are absorbed by a trough of low pressure.

December 15

- 1800 UTC, (0600 FST December 16) – The JTWC reports that Tropical Depression 06P has formed 535 km (330 mi) southeast of Honiara in the Solomon Islands.

December 17

- 0000 UTC, (1200 FST) – TCWC Nadi designates Tropical Depression 06P as a tropical depression.
- 1200 UTC, (0000 FST December 18) –TCWC Nadi and the JTWC report that Tropical Depression 06P has moved into the Australian region, where it is later named as Joy.

=== January and February ===
- There were no tropical disturbances reported within the South Pacific Ocean during January and February 1991.

=== March ===
March 15

- 1800 UTC, (0600 FST March 16) – Tropical Depression 16P moves into the South Pacific from the Australian region.

March 21

- 0000 UTC, (1200 FST) – The JTWC reports that Tropical Depression 16P has dissipated.

=== April ===
April 30

- 1200 UTC, (0000 FST, May 1) – The 1990–91 South Pacific cyclone season officially ends.

=== May ===
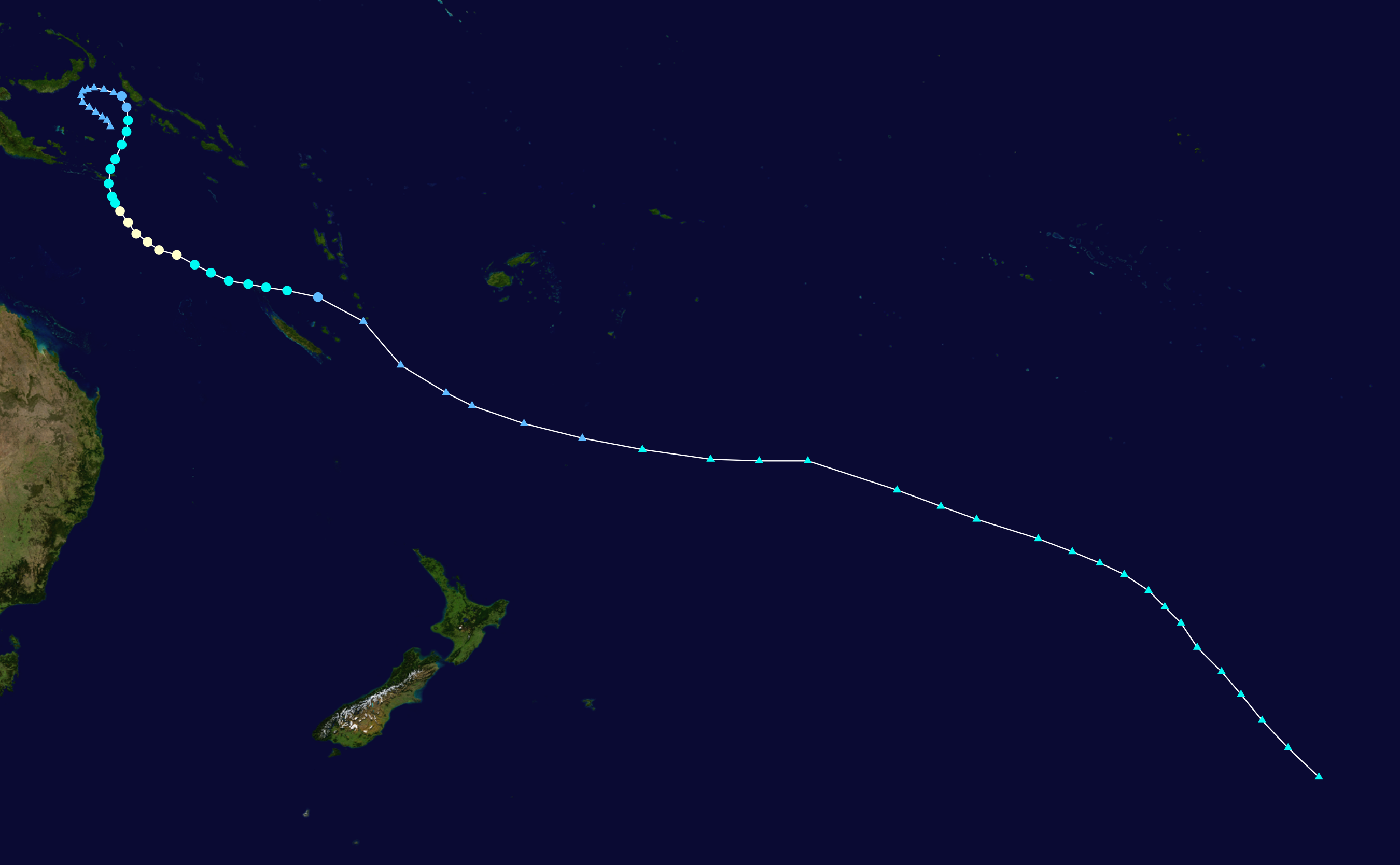
Track map of Tropical Cyclone Lisa (21P)

May 11

- 1200 UTC, (0000 FST, May 12) – TCWC Nadi reports that Tropical Cyclone Lisa (21P) has moved into the South Pacific from the Australian region, while at its peak intensity as a category 2 tropical cyclone with 10-minute sustained wind speeds of 110 km/h (70 mph).

May 12

- 1200 UTC, (12:00 FST), May 13) – TCWC Nadi issues its final advisory on Tropical Cyclone Lisa as it weakens into a depression.
- 1200 UTC, (00:00 FST, May 13) – The JTWC reports that Tropical Storm Lisa (21P) has weakened into a tropical depression.
- 1800 UTC, (0600 FST, May 13) – Depression Lisa (21P) passes over Anatom Island, Vanuatu.
- 1800 UTC, (06:00 FST, May 13) – TCWC Nadi reports that Depression Lisa (21P) has weakened into an extratropical cyclone.

May 19

- 0000 UTC, (1200 FST) – The extratropical remnants of Tropical Cyclone Lisa are last noted by TCWC Wellington as they dissipate.
