= Tropical cyclones in 1990 =

Year boundaries
- First system: Baomavo
- Formed: January 2, 1990
- Last system: Joy
- Dissipated: December 27, 1990

Strongest system
- Name: Flo
- Lowest pressure: 890 mbar (hPa); 26.2817 inHg

Longest lasting system
- Name: Trudy
- Duration: 17 days

Year statistics
- Total systems: 124
- Named systems: 92
- Total fatalities: 3,383 total
- Total damage: $6.3 billion (1990 USD)
Related articles
- 1990 Atlantic hurricane season
- 1990 Pacific hurricane season
- 1990 Pacific typhoon season
- 1990 North Indian Ocean cyclone season
- 1990–91 South-West Indian Ocean cyclone season
- 1990–91 South-West Indian Ocean cyclone season
- 1990–91 Australian region cyclone season
- 1990–91 Australian region cyclone season
- 1990–91 South Pacific cyclone season
- 1990–91 South Pacific cyclone season

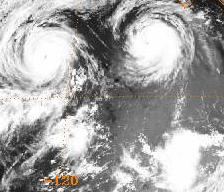
Visible image of Tropical Depression Eleven-E on the bottom right, hurricanes Hernan on the left and Iselle on the center in July 25 south of Mexico as seen by GOES-7.

During 1990, tropical cyclones formed within seven different tropical cyclone basins, located within various parts of the Atlantic, Pacific and Indian Oceans. During the year, a total of 124 systems formed with 92 of these developing further and were named by the responsible warning center. The strongest tropical cyclone of the year was Typhoon Flo. The deadliest tropical cyclone was the 1990 Andhra Pradesh cyclone, while the costliest was also Typhoon Flo. Four Category 5 tropical cyclones formed in 1990, which all formed in the Western Pacific.

Tropical cyclone activity in each basin is under the authority of an RSMC. The National Hurricane Center (NHC) is responsible for tropical cyclones in the North Atlantic and East Pacific. The Central Pacific Hurricane Center (CPHC) is responsible for tropical cyclones in the Central Pacific. Both the NHC and CPHC are subdivisions of the National Weather Service. Activity in the West Pacific is monitored by the Japan Meteorological Agency (JMA). Systems in the North Indian Ocean are monitored by the India Meteorological Department (IMD). The Météo-France located in Réunion (MFR) monitors tropical activity in the South-West Indian Ocean. The Australian region is monitored by five TCWCs that are under the coordination of the Australian Bureau of Meteorology (BOM). Similarly, the South Pacific is monitored by both the Fiji Meteorological Service (FMS) and the Meteorological Service of New Zealand Limited. Other, unofficial agencies that provide additional guidance in tropical cyclone monitoring include the Philippine Atmospheric, Geophysical and Astronomical Services Administration (PAGASA) and the Joint Typhoon Warning Center (JTWC).

== Global conditions and hydrological summary ==
The traditional nino 3.4 Index values, between June 1988 and May 1992.

1990 saw a gradually increasing, neutral Nino 3.4 region value, with global average sea surface temperatures being 0.28 °C (0.50 °F) above average.

== Summary ==
=== North Atlantic Ocean ===
The Atlantic hurricane season officially began on June 1, but activity in 1990 began six days earlier with the formation of Tropical Depression One on May 24. It was an above average season in which 16 tropical depressions formed. Fourteen depressions attained tropical storm status, and eight of them attained hurricane status. There was only one tropical cyclone to reach major hurricane status (Category 3 or higher on the Saffir–Simpson Hurricane Scale), which was slightly below the 1950–2005 average of two. The season featured no landfalling tropical storms in the United States, which was unusual. This was only the sixth such occurrence known, the other seasons being 1853, 1862, 1864, 1922, and 1962. However, Tropical Storm Marco was the only tropical cyclone to make landfall in the United States at tropical cyclone status, but it hit with wind speeds of 35 mph (56 km/h), which is below tropical storm status. Overall, the storms of the season caused 171 deaths and approximately $153 million in damage.< Hurricane Nana dissipated on October 21, over a month before the official end of the season on November 30. Hurricane Diana was a notable Category 2 hurricane in August, which affected many parts of Central America and Mexico, which caused 139 deaths and $90 million in damage. Hurricane Klaus was another notable hurricane that reached Category 1 status in October, which affected portions of the Lesser Antilles, the Greater Antilles, and the Bahamas. The remnants of Klaus brought heavy rain to Florida, which worsened the flooding caused by Tropical Storm Marco. Both Klaus and Diana got their names retired, and will never again be used for a tropical cyclone.

No tropical cyclogenesis occurred in June, while little tropical cyclogenesis occurred in July. The second tropical cyclone of the season did not form until July 22. After that, tropical activity suddenly spiked, and from late-July to mid-August, there was a period of above-average activity. Reduction in activity occurred in mid-August, then resumed on August 24 with the formation of Hurricane Gustav. August was relatively active in terms of tropical activity, but only two named storms formed in September, which both attained hurricane status. In October, activity was above-average, with four named storms forming. After an active October, no tropical cyclogenesis occurred in November.

The season had an accumulated cyclone energy (ACE) rating of 97, which is slightly above the mean value of 96.1. ACE is a measure of the power of a tropical cyclone multiplied by the amount of time the cyclone existed. It is only calculated for tropical cyclones that have wind speeds of at least 39 mph (63 km/h), which is the wind speed for storms to attain tropical storm status.

=== Eastern and Central Pacific Ocean ===
The Pacific hurricane season was very active in terms of the amount of tropical cyclones and the accumulated cyclone energy (ACE). All tropical cyclones in the basin formed from westward-moving African tropical waves. There were 27 tropical depression, and 21 of those attained at least tropical storm status. A record breaking 16 of those tropical cyclones reached hurricane strength, tied with 1992, 2014, and 2015, and 6 of those hurricanes attained major hurricane strength (Category 3 or above). Only 6 tropical cyclones did not attain hurricane strength. This was twice the average amount in terms of the amount of tropical cyclones reaching hurricane intensity. The season started earlier with Hurricane Alma forming on May 12. Tropical cyclogenesis increased in June, with tropical storms and hurricanes Boris, Cristina, Douglas, and Elida. In July, tropical activity remained above-average, with hurricanes Fausto, Genevieve, Hernan and Iselle forming, with Hernan and Iselle both attaining hurricane strength. In August, seven tropical cyclones formed, which is above-average, higher than the mean of 4.6 tropical storms in August. Tropical cyclones Aka, Diana (Diana crossed over from the Atlantic to the Pacific), Julio, Kenna and Lowell formed. Tropical depressions Two-C and Twelve-E also formed in August. The final three months featured the strongest hurricanes of the season, with hurricanes Trudy, Odile, and Marie, all being Category 4 hurricanes. Hurricane Trudy was the most intense hurricane of the season. The final storm, Hurricane Vance, dissipated on October 31, marking the end of tropical activity in the Pacific.

All tropical cyclones, with the exception of hurricanes Marie and Polo, developed between 5 and 15 degrees north of the equator, which is the typical area most favorable for tropical cyclone development. Most tropical cyclones moved in a westward or northwestward track, and dissipated in colder waters. One crossed the International date line before transitioning to a remnant low.

The accumulated cyclone energy (ACE) for the season measured at 249.5 units (Eastern and Central Pacific combined), calculated by Colorado State University and using data from the National Hurricane Center, which is the fourth highest ACE reading recorded in a Pacific hurricane season.

=== Western Pacific Ocean ===
The Pacific typhoon season was very active in terms of the number of tropical depressions, tropical storms and typhoons that formed. The season featured 41 tropical cyclones, 31 of which intensified into named storms. 19 of those storms intensified into typhoons, and 4 intensified into super typhoons.

The season started off on January 12 with the development of Severe Tropical Storm Koryn. There was no tropical activity until 3 months later, when Tropical Storm Lewis formed on April 26. May was slightly above-average with 3 tropical cyclones, with Typhoon Marian, which formed on May 14, and CMA Tropical Depressions 4 and 5, which formed on May 20 and 24, which is above the 1981-2010 average of 2 tropical cyclones in May. In June, Tropical Depression 04W and Severe Tropical Storm Nathan, with Nathan bring some impact to the Philippines and China. Typhoon Ofelia was a moderately strong typhoon that formed on June 16 and brought severe impacts to the Philippines, Taiwan and China before dissipating in Korea on June 25. Ofelia caused 96 deaths and $207 million in damage. Typhoon Percy was another strong typhoon which brought severe impacts to similar areas where Ofelia brushed through. Percy formed on June 20 and reached its peak intensity on June 24 with 150 km/h (93 mph) winds. Percy caused 27 deaths and $426 million in damage. Overall, June was an above-average month.

In July, typhoons Steve, Vernon, tropical storms Robyn and Tasha, and CMA Tropical Depression 11 formed. July was a less impactful month, with Robyn, CMA Tropical Depression 11 and Tasha making landfall below typhoon status. Impacts in July include Robyn dropping 244 mm (9.6 in) of rain in Vladivostok, Russia, CMA 11 bringing heavy rain to much of Vietnam and causing minimal damage, and Tasha bringing widespread flooding and damage in southern China, causing 108 deaths. Overall, July saw several tropical cyclones which caused some damage. The first tropical cyclone in August was Severe Tropical Storm Winona, which was named so on August 7 and reached peak intensity of 110 km/h (70 mph) on August 8, before making landfall in Japan. Typhoon Yancywas a powerful typhoon that killed 12 people in the Philippines after a landslide destroyed a dormitory, while in China, damage was more severe with 216 deaths. An additional 20 people died in Taiwan. Central Pacific Tropical Storm Aka crossed into the basin on August 13. The JTWC downgraded Aka to a tropical depression due to high wind shear and loss of convection, until it dissipated on August 15, south of Wake Island. Typhoon Zola originated from a cutoff of Yancy's large area of convection. By August 18, Zola upgraded to a tropical storm, further intensifying to a typhoon the next day, eventually reaching peak intensity on August 21 with 140 km/h (85 mph) winds. Zola made landfall in Japan, causing $104 million in damage and 6 fatalities due to high winds and heavy rainfall. Typhoon Abe was a powerful and devastating typhoon that originated on August 23 from an intense monsoon surge. Abe did not form quickly between August 24-27 due to the surge initially not having the conducive environment for cyclone formation. On August 30, Abe peaked with winds of 140 km/h (85 mph), before crossing the Ryukyu Islands and the East China Sea, eventually making landfall in the Chinese provinces of Zhejiang and Jiangsu, then crossing the middle portion of South Korea as a tropical storm, before dissipating on September 1. 12 people were killed in Manila due to heavy monsoon rains, with landslides causing an additional 32 deaths in Benguet, Nueva Viscaya, and Nueva Ecija. In Taiwan, 1 death and 6 injuries were caused by flooding, with 51 additional deaths and 250 injuries near Shanghai.

== Systems ==
=== January ===
Tropical cyclones formed in January 1990
Storm name	Dates active	Max wind km/h (mph)	Pressure (hPa)	Areas affected	Damage (USD)	Deaths	Refs
Baomavo	January 2–9	150 (95)	941	None	None	None	
Rosita	January 4–17	85 (50)	988	None	None	None	
Sam	January 11–21	130 (80)	966	Western Australia	Unknown	None	
Koryn	January 12–17	100 (65)	980	Caroline Islands, Mariana Islands	None	None	
Coral Sea	January 20–25	75 (45)	Unknown	New Caledonia	None	None	
Tina	January 25–28	95 (60)	976	Western Australia	Minimal	None	
Nancy	January 26–February 4	110 (70)	975	Queensland, New South Wales, New Zealand	Unknown	Unknown	
Ofa	January 27–February 10	185 (115)	925	Polynesia	$187 million	8	
Cereza	January 31–February 11	95 (60)	976	Mauritius	Unknown	None	

=== February ===
Tropical cyclones formed in February 1990
Storm name	Dates active	Max wind km/h (mph)	Pressure (hPa)	Areas affected	Damage (USD)	Deaths	Refs
Dety	February 2–11	135 (85)	954	None	None	None	
Samoa	February 6–9	65 (40)	Unknown	Polynesia	None	None	
Peni	February 12–18	120 (75)	970	Cook Islands	Unknown	Unknown	
Vincent	February 25–March 6	130 (80)	965	Western Australia	Unknown	Unknown	
Greg	February 28–March 5	75 (45)	990	Northern Territory, Queensland	None	None	

=== March ===
Tropical cyclones formed in March 1990
Storm name	Dates active	Max wind km/h (mph)	Pressure (hPa)	Areas affected	Damage (USD)	Deaths	Refs
Edisoana	March 1–8	135 (85)	954	Rodrigues	Unknown	Unknown	
Hilda	March 4–7	110 (70)	970	None	None	None	
Walter	March 4–13	95 (60)	985	None	None	None	
Gregoara	March 13–27	170 (105)	927	Cocos Islands	Unknown	None	
Alex	March 14–26	220 (140)	927	None	None	None	
Ivor	March 15–26	125 (80)	965	Queensland	Minimal	Unknown	
Rae	March 16–24	95 (60)	985	Tuvalu, Fiji, Tonga	$26.2 million	3	

=== April ===
Tropical cyclones formed in April 1990
Storm name	Dates active	Max wind km/h (mph)	Pressure (hPa)	Areas affected	Damage (USD)	Deaths	Refs
Hanta	April 11–14	65 (40)	990	Madagascar	Unknown	Unknown	
Bessi	April 13–18	85 (50)	990	None	None	None	
01B	April 17–18	45 (30)	1004	None	None	None	
Lewis	April 26–May 3	65 (40)	998	Caroline Islands	None	None	

=== May ===
Tropical cyclones formed in May 1990
Storm name	Dates active	Max wind km/h (mph)	Pressure (hPa)	Areas affected	Damage (USD)	Deaths	Refs
BOB 02B	May 4–10	235 (145)	920	India	$600 million	510	
Ikonjo	May 11–21	80 (50)	976	Seychelles	Unknown	None	
Alma	May 12-18	140 (85)	979	None	None	None	
Marian	May 14-19	130 (80)	965	Philippines, Taiwan	$10 million	None	
Land	May 15	45 (30)	Unknown	Bangladesh	Unknown	Unknown	
TD	May 20-23	Unknown	1000	None	None	None	
One	May 24-26	45 (30)	1007	Cuba, Florida	None	None	
TD	May 24-28	55 (35)	1000	China	None	None	

=== June ===
Typhoon Percy

Tropical cyclones formed in June 1990
Storm name	Dates active	Max wind km/h (mph)	Pressure (hPa)	Areas affected	Damage (USD)	Deaths	Refs
Boris	June 2 - 8	150 (90)	977	Baja California Peninsula	None	None	
Cristina	June 8 - 16	100 (65)	994	None	None	None	
BOB 02	June 13 - 15	55 (35)	990	Odisha, Jharkhand, Madhya Pradesh	Unknown	Unknown	
04W	June 13 - 16	55 (35)	1002	None	None	None	
Nathan (Akang)	June 14 - 19	100 (65)	980	Philippines, South China, Vietnam	$346,000	12	
Ofelia (Bising)	June 16 - 25	120 (75)	970	Philippines, Taiwan, China	$207 million	96	
Douglas	June 19 - 23	100 (65)	992	Mexico, Central America	Minimal	1	
Percy (Klaring)	June 20 - 30	215 (130)	950	Caroline Islands, Philippines, South China, Taiwan	27	$426 million	
Elida	June 26 - July 2	130 (80)	990	Revillagigedo Island	None	None	
Six-E	June 29 - July 3	55 (35)	1007	None	None	None	

=== July ===
Tropical cyclones formed in July 1990
Storm name	Dates active	Max wind km/h (mph)	Pressure (hPa)	Areas affected	Damage (USD)	Deaths	Refs
TD	July 1 - 2	Unknown	1006	Philippines	None	None	
Robyn (Deling)	July 4 - 12	85 (50)	992	Taiwan, Ryukyu Islands, South Korea	None	None	
Fausto	July 6 - 12	140 (85)	979	None	None	None	
Genevieve	July 10 - 18	165 (105)	970	None	None	None	
TD	July 16 - 17	Unknown	1008	Philippines	None	None	
Hernan	July 19 - 31	250 (155)	928	None	None	None	
Iselle	July 20 - 30	195 (120)	958	None	None	None	
TD	July 21 - 23	Unknown	1002	Vietnam	Minimal	None	
Arthur	July 22 - 27	110 (70)	995	Greater Antilles, Windward Islands, Venezuela, Grenada, Jamaica, Hispaniola, Puerto Rico	Minimal	None	
Tasha (Emang)	July 22 - August 1	100 (65)	980	Philippines, South China, Vietnam	$71.2 million	108	
Steve	July 23 - August 2	155 (100)	940	Mariana Islands	None	None	
Bertha	July 24 - August 2	130 (80)	973	Bahamas, East Coast of the United States, Bermuda, Atlantic Canada	$3.91 million	9	
Vernon	July 28 - August 9	140 (85)	955	None	None	None	
Cesar	July 31 - August 7	85 (50)	100	None	None	None	

=== August ===
Tropical cyclones formed in August 1990
Storm name	Dates active	Max wind km/h (mph)	Pressure (hPa)	Areas affected	Damage (USD)	Deaths	Refs
Edouard	August 2–11	75 (45)	1003	Portugal	None	None	
Diana	August 4–9	155 (100)	980	Costa Rica, Nicaragua, Honduras, Belize, Yucatán Peninsula, Mainland Mexico	$90.7 million	139	
Winona	August 4–11	110 (70)	975	Japan	$60.3 million	1	
Aka	August 7–15	100 (65)	991	Hawaiian Islands, Marshall Islands	None	None	
Two-C	August 10–13	55 (35)	1000	None	None	None	
Fran	August 11–15	65 (40)	1007	Greater Antilles, Windward Islands, Venezuela	Minimal	None	
Yancy (Gading)	August 11–22	150 (90)	950	Caroline Islands, Mariana Islands, Taiwan, China	$384 million	284	
Twelve-E	August 16–19	55 (35)	1009	None	None	None	
Zola	August 16–23	140 (85)	960	Marshall Islands, Japan	$104 million	6	
Julio	August 17–24	185 (115)	960	None	None	None	
Kenna	August 21–30	120 (75)	980	None	None	None	
Lowell	August 23–September 1	120 (75)	986	None	None	None	
Abe (Iliang)	August 24–September 1	140 (85)	955	Caroline Islands, Mariana Islands, Ryukyu Islands, Taiwan, East China, Korean Peninsula	$748 million	195	
Becky (Heling)	August 24–30	130 (80)	965	Philippines, South China, Vietnam, Laos, Thailand, Burma	Unknown	32	
Gustav	August 24–September 3	195 (120)	956	Lesser Antilles	None	None	
Hortense	August 25–31	100 (65)	993	None	None	None	

=== September ===
Tropical cyclones formed in September 1990
Storm name	Dates active	Max wind km/h (mph)	Pressure (hPa)	Areas affected	Damage (USD)	Deaths	Refs
Cecil	September 3-4	85 (50)	1002	Eastern China	Unknown	43	

=== October ===
Tropical cyclones formed in October 1990
Storm name	Dates active	Max wind km/h (mph)	Pressure (hPa)	Areas affected	Damage (USD)	Deaths	Refs

=== November ===
Tropical cyclones formed in November 1990
Storm name	Dates active	Max wind km/h (mph)	Pressure (hPa)	Areas affected	Damage (USD)	Deaths	Refs
Mike	November 6–18	185 (115)	915	Caroline Islands, Philippines, Vietnam, China	$448 million	816	
Nell	November 9–12	95 (60)	990				
Susang	November 15–17	55 (35)	1004				
Owen	November 20–December 4	175 (110)	925			2	
Sina	November 20–December 4	140 (85)	960	Fiji, Tonga, Niue, Southern Cook Islands	$18.5 million	None	
Page	November 21–December 3	195 (120)	910	Japan	$33 million	4	

=== December ===
Tropical cyclones formed in December 1990
Storm name	Dates active	Max wind km/h (mph)	Pressure (hPa)	Areas affected	Damage (USD)	Deaths	Refs
Laurence	December 8–12	65 (40)	992	None	None	None	
Russ	December 13–23	185 (115)	915	Marshall Islands, Mariana Islands, Caroline Islands	$120 million	None	
BOB 09	December 14–19	100 (60)	Not specified	Bangladesh, Myanmar	Unknown	Unknown	
Joy	December 15–27	165 (105)	940	Queensland	$234 million	6	

== Global effects ==
Season name	Areas affected	Systems formed	Named storms	Damage (USD)	Deaths
1990 Atlantic hurricane season					
1990 Pacific hurricane season					
1990 Pacific typhoon season ^{3}					
1990 North Indian Ocean cyclone season					
1989–90 South-West Indian Ocean cyclone season ^{2}					
1990–91 South-West Indian Ocean cyclone season ^{3}					
1989–90 Australian region cyclone season ^{2}					
1990–91 Australian region cyclone season ^{3}					
1989–90 South Pacific cyclone season ^{2}					
1990–91 South Pacific cyclone season ^{3}					
Worldwide	(See above)	(Note: The sum of the number of systems and fatalities in each basin will not equal the number shown as the total. This is because when systems move between basins, it creates a discrepancy in the actual number of systems and fatalities.)		$X billion	XXX

== See also ==
- Tropical cyclones by year
- List of earthquakes in 1990
- Tornadoes of 1990

== Notes ==
^{1} Only systems that formed either on or after January 1, 1990 are counted in the seasonal totals.

^{2} Only systems that formed either before or on December 31, 1990 are counted in the seasonal totals.

^{3} The wind speeds for this tropical cyclone basin are based on the IMD scale which uses 3-minute sustained winds.

^{4} The wind speeds for the Atlantic, Eastern and Central Pacific tropical cyclone basin are based on the Saffir–Simpson scale which uses 1-minute sustained winds.

^{5}The wind speeds for this tropical cyclone are based on Météo-France which uses gust winds.
