= 1990–91 South Pacific cyclone season =

Tropical cyclone season

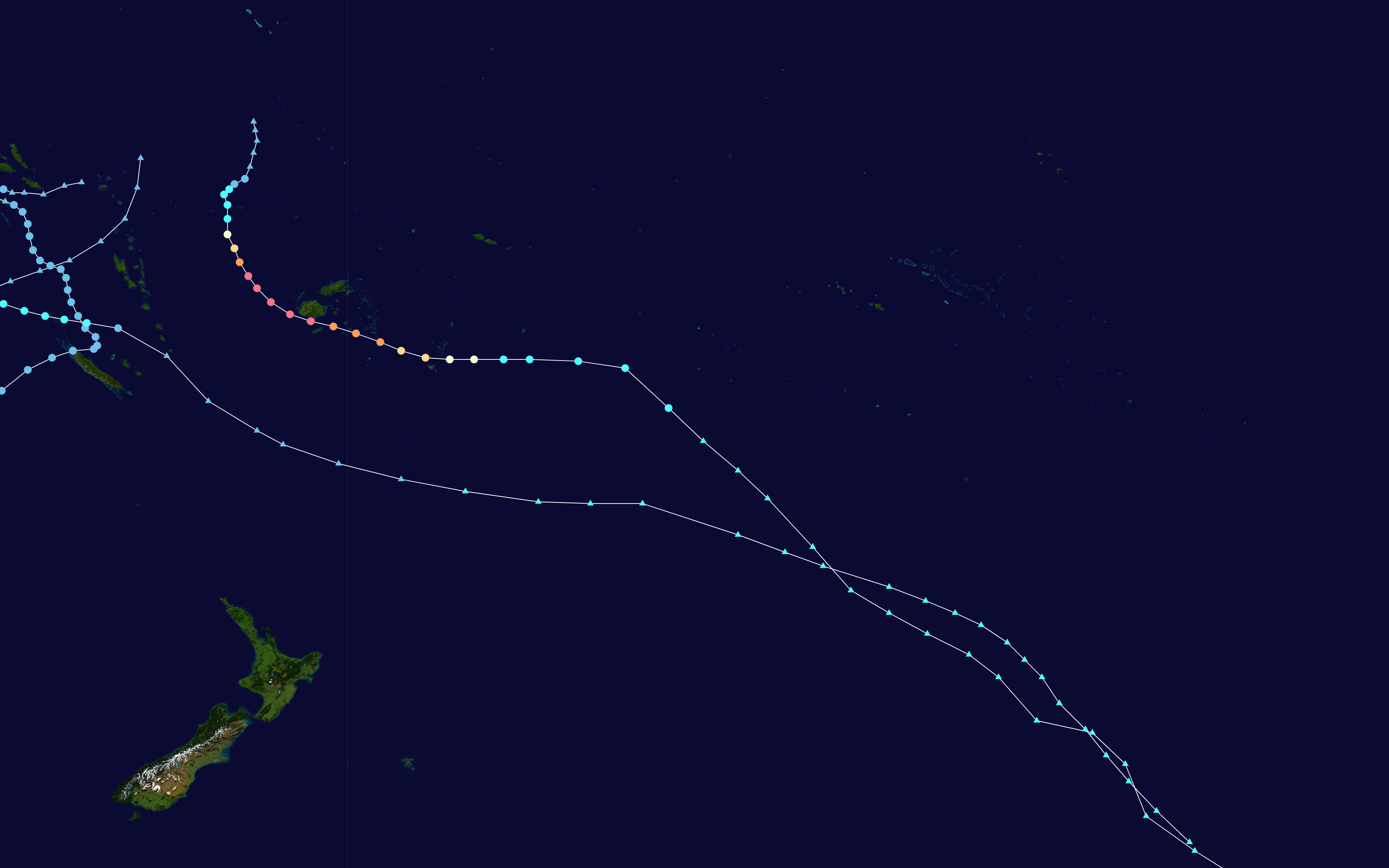
- Season summary map

Seasonal boundaries
- First system formed: November 23, 1990
- Last system dissipated: May 19, 1991

Strongest storm
- Name: Sina
  - Maximum winds: 140 km/h (85 mph) (10-minute sustained)
  - Lowest pressure: 960 hPa (mbar)

Seasonal statistics
- Total depressions: 5
- Tropical cyclones: 2 (record low, tied with 2025–26)
- Severe tropical cyclones: 1
- Total fatalities: None reported
- Total damage: $18.5 million (1991 USD)

Related articles
- Timeline of the 1990–91 South Pacific cyclone season; 1990–91 South-West Indian Ocean cyclone season; 1990–91 Australian region cyclone season

The 1990–91 South Pacific cyclone season was the least active South Pacific cyclone season on record, tied with the 2025-26 season, with only two tropical cyclones occurring within the South Pacific basin to the east of 160°E. The season officially ran from November 1, 1990, to April 30, 1991, with the first disturbance of the season forming on November 23, 1990, while the final disturbance dissipated on May 19, 1991. During the season there were no deaths recorded from any of the tropical cyclones while they were within the basin. However, six people were killed by Cyclone Joy, when it made landfall on Australia. As a result of the impacts caused by Joy and Sina, the names were retired from the tropical cyclone naming lists.

During the season, tropical cyclones were monitored by the Fiji Meteorological Service and the New Zealand MetService, while other meteorological services such as the Australian Bureau of Meteorology, Meteo France as well as the United States Joint Typhoon Warning Center and Naval Western Oceanography Center (NWOC) also monitored the basin. The JTWC issued warnings between 160°E and the International Date Line, while the NWOC issued warnings for tropical cyclones forming between the International Date Line and the coasts of the Americas. Both the JTWC and the NWOC designated tropical cyclones with a number and either a P suffix with numbers assigned in order to tropical cyclones developing within the whole of the Southern Hemisphere. The FMS, MetService and the BoM all used the Australian Tropical Cyclone Intensity Scale and estimate wind speeds over a ten-minute period, while the JTWC estimated sustained winds over a one-minute period, which are subsequently compared to the Saffir–Simpson hurricane wind scale (SSHWS).

== Seasonal summary ==
As a result of the South Pacific Convergence Zone being both weaker and located further to the north than in previous seasons and the Madden–Julian oscillations being weaker and less regular defined than in previous tropical cyclone seasons. As a result, only three tropical cyclones occurred within the South Pacific basin between 160°E and 120°W, which made the season one of the least active on record. The first tropical cyclone was first noted as a shallow depression on November 20 before it was named Sina on November 24 after it had intensified into a tropical cyclone. After peaking as a category three severe tropical cyclone on the Australian tropical cyclone intensity scale, Sina affected Fiji, Tonga, Niue and the Southern Cook Islands with total damage estimated at over 18.5 million before it was last noted on December 4, as it was absorbed by an advancing trough of low pressure near 50°S. During December 15, the precursor tropical low to Cyclone Joy developed near the Solomon Islands. Over the next two days, the system moved westwards before it moved into the Australian region during December 17. The system was subsequently named Joy on December 19, before it made landfall on Queensland during December 26.

The basin then remained quiet until March when three significant tropical depressions including 15 and 16P were observed within the Coral Sea/Australian region, which did not develop into tropical cyclones but were subject to gale warnings. 15P was first noted on March 3, while it was located about 900 km (560 mi) to the east of the Solomon Islands and over the next couple of days subsequently moved south-westwards and out of the South Pacific basin during the next day. 16P was first noted on March 14, while located about 300 km (185 mi) to the southeast of Honiara in the Solomon Islands. (Note: The figures for maximum sustained winds and position estimates are rounded to the nearest 5 units (miles, or kilometers), following the convention used in the Fiji Meteorological Service's operational products for each storm. All other units are rounded to the nearest digit.) Over the next couple of days the system moved towards the south-east before the JTWC designated the system 16P and initiated advisories on it during March 18, after it had moved into the South Pacific basin. Over the next couple of days the system, moved towards the south-southeast, before it turned towards the southwest and passed over New Caledonia on March 20, before it was last noted during the next day moving out of the basin. The final tropical cyclone of the season, Lisa, moved into the Southern Pacific on May 11 at its peak intensity of 110 km/h (75 mph). During the next day as the storm moved towards the subtropical jet, Lisa rapidly weakened into a tropical depression before passing over Anatom Island without causing any significant damage. After the season both the names Sina and Joy were retired from the naming lists for the region, while it was determined that a weak gale force tropical cyclone had affected Tonga between December 14–17.

== Systems ==
=== Severe Tropical Cyclone Sina ===
- Category 3 severe tropical cyclone (Australian scale)
- Category 4 tropical cyclone (SSHWS)
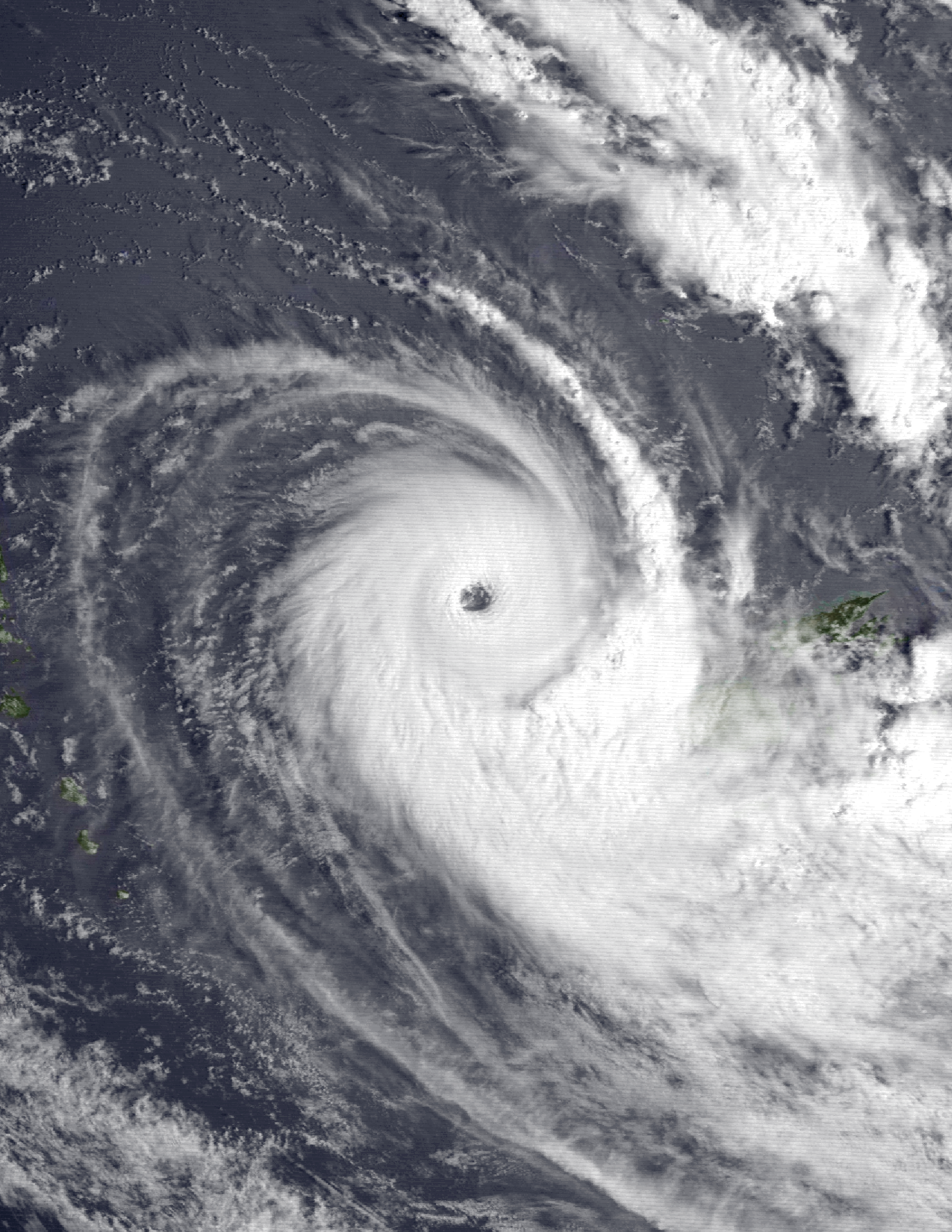
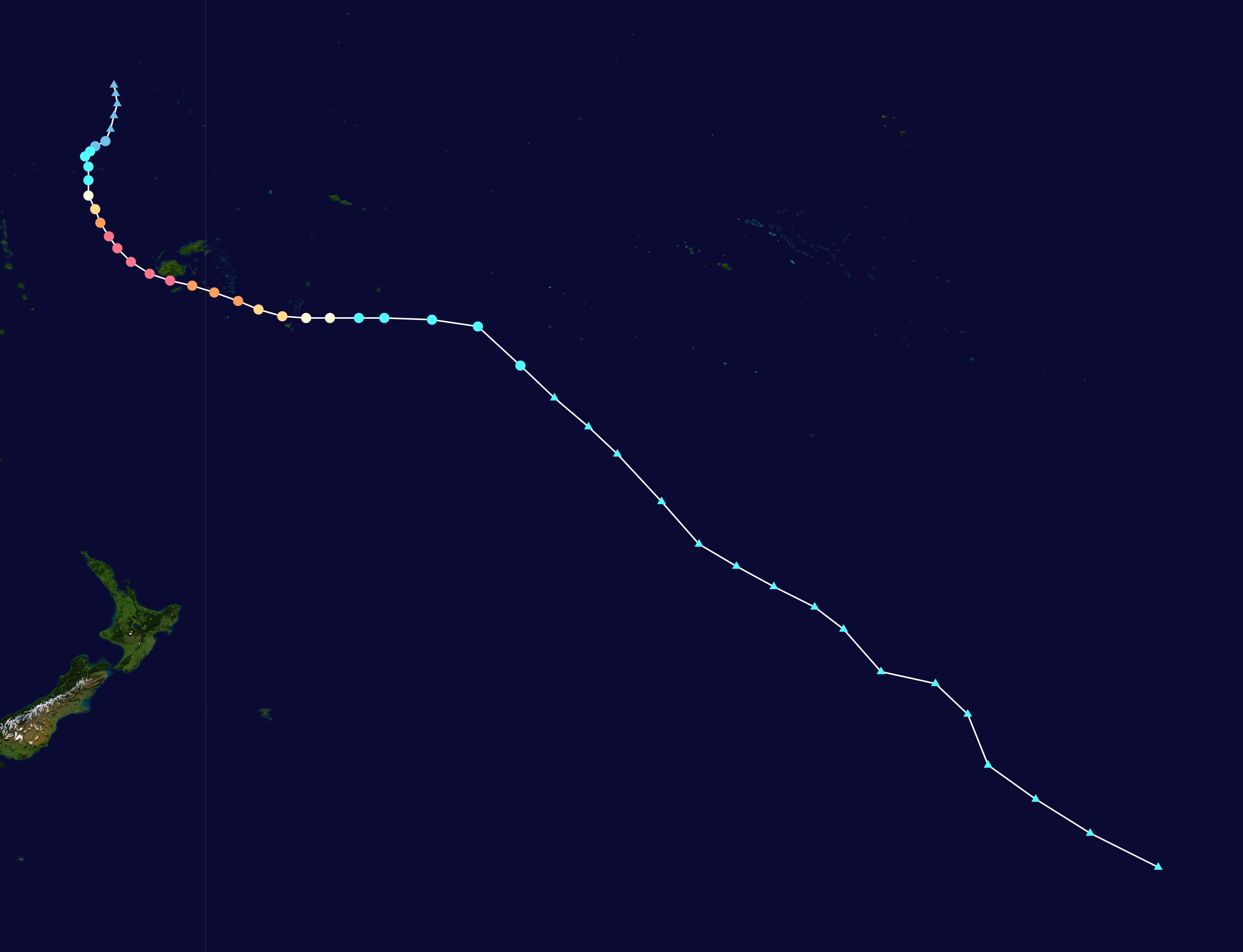
- Duration: November 20 – December 4
- Peak intensity: 140 km/h (85 mph) (10-min); 960 hPa (mbar)

On November 20, the FMS started to monitor a shallow tropical depression that had developed within the South Pacific Convergence Zone to the west of Wallis Island. Over the next three days the system moved towards the west-northwest and the Fijian dependency of Rotuma, before the JTWC initiated advisories and classified the depression as Tropical Cyclone 03P during November 24. The FMS subsequently named the system Sina after the depression had developed into a category 1 tropical cyclone on the Australian scale, while it was located about 425 km (265 mi) to the northwest of Rotuma. During the next day the cyclone continued to intensify and developed an eye as it moved erratically towards the west-southwest and performed a small clockwise loop. During that day Sina's eye became very distinct on satellite imagery, as it intensified and the upper level steering flow which resulted in Sina moving erratically towards the southeast and Fiji. Later that day, the FMS reported that the system had peaked as a category 3 severe tropical cyclone, with 10-minute sustained wind speeds of 140 km/h (85 mph).

The JTWC subsequently reported early the next day that Sina had peaked with 1-minute sustained wind speeds of 140 km/h (85 mph), which made it equivalent to a category 4 hurricane on the SSHWS. Sina remained at its peak intensity for most of that day, before it started to gradually weaken as it passed about 40 km (25 mi) to the south of Viti Levu before it passed over the island groups of Vatulele and Moala and the Southern Lau Islands during November 28. Early on November 29, Sina weakened into a category two tropical cyclone on the Australian scale just before it passed to the north of Tongatapu in Tonga. During that day the system moved eastwards towards the Southern Cook Islands and gradually weakened further. Early the next day, the system passed about 160 km (100 mi) to the south of Niue, before it recurved sharply towards the south-southeast later that day as it approached the Southern Cook Islands. The system subsequently rapidly weakened and transitioned into an extratropical cyclone under the influence of strong vertical wind shear and cooler sea surface temperatures. Over the next couple of days Sina's extratropical remnants maintained a southeastward track, before it was absorbed by an advancing trough of low pressure near 50°S on December 4.

The cyclone caused over US$18.5 million in damages as it affected Fiji, Tonga, Niue and the Southern Cook Islands. Ahead of the system affecting Fiji, hundreds of holidaymakers were evacuated from Fiji's outer island resorts to hotels on the mainland. High winds and heavy rain forced the closure of several local airports and the main Nadi International Airport. As Sina moved through the archipelago, the system destroyed or damaged houses and other building structures, while bringing down electric and telephone lines and uprooting trees. The system also washed away a railway bridge on Vanua Levu that was used to take sugar cane to Labasa's mills, growers had no choice but to go through the village of Korowiri. However, the workers refused to go into their fields unless they had police protection to go through the village, after Methodists from the local church attacked a group of growers for working on Sundays in defiance of Fiji's Sunday Observance Decree. Within Tonga only minor damage to weak structures, trees, banana plantations, electric and telephone lines was recorded. Within both Niue and the Southern Cook Islands, only minor damage to crops and structures was reported.

=== Tropical Depression Joy ===
- Tropical depression (Australian scale)
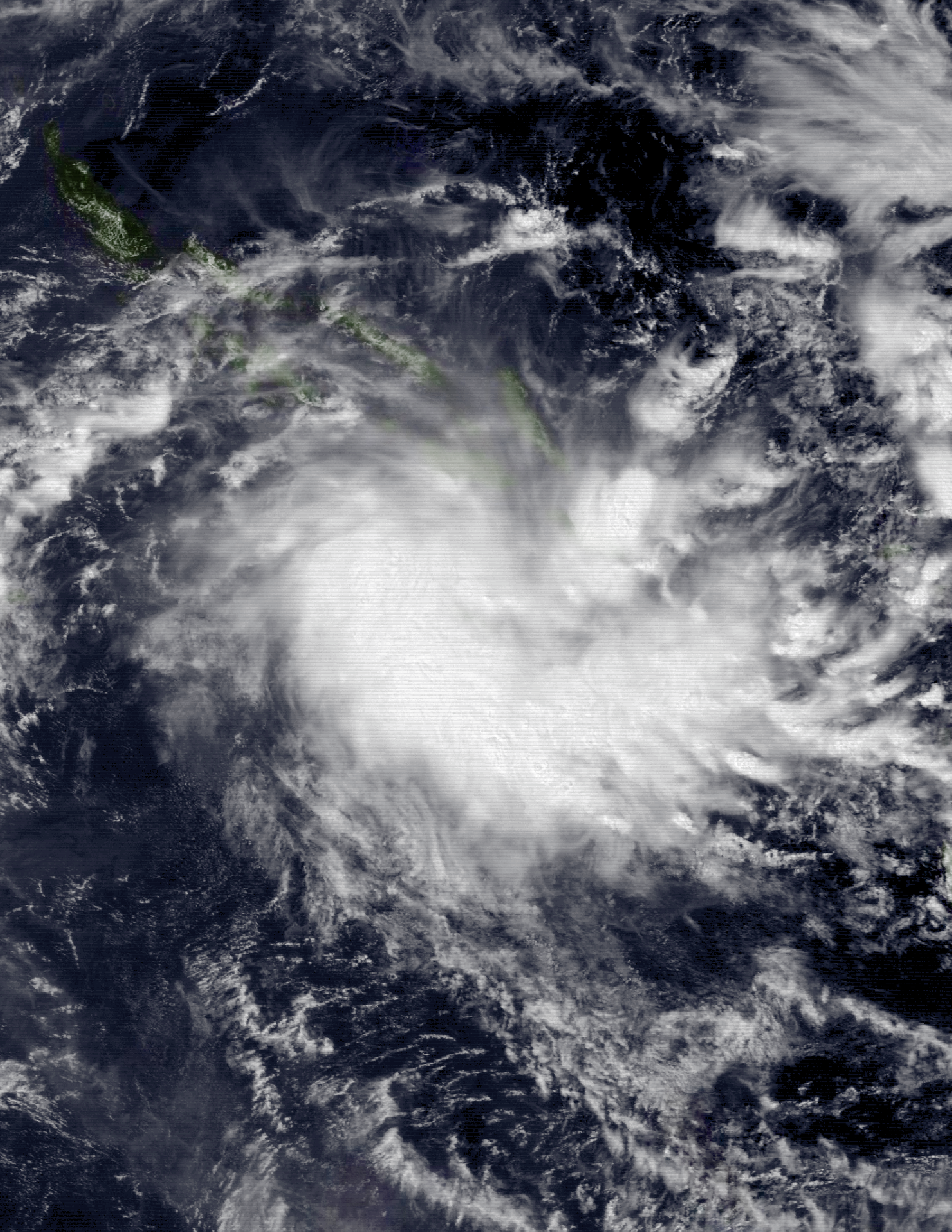
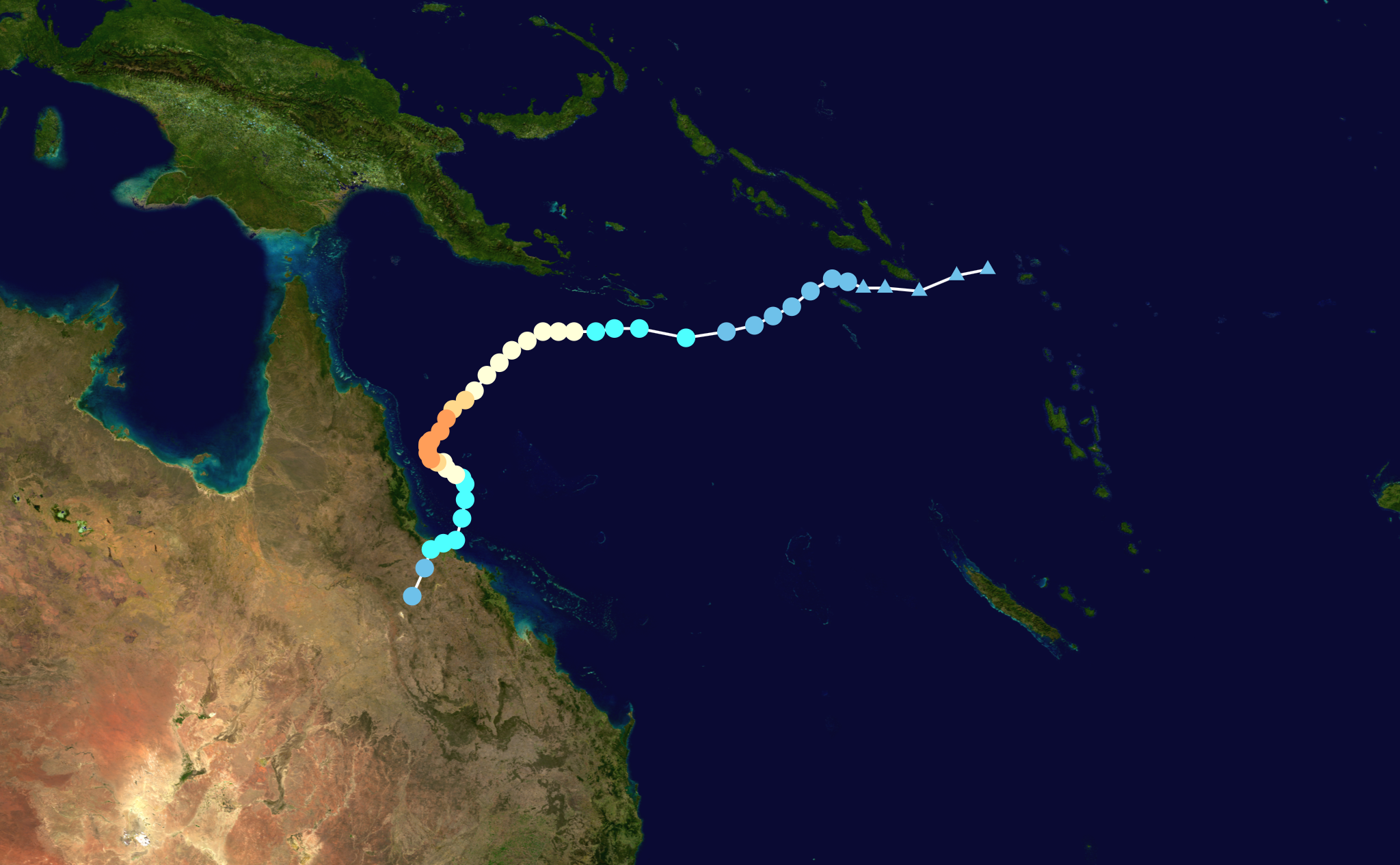
- Duration: December 17 – December 17 (exited basin)
- Peak intensity: 45 km/h (30 mph) (10-min); 1001 hPa (mbar)

On December 15, in response to the formation of Typhoon Russ, in the North-Western Pacific Ocean, a tropical low developed about 500 km (310 mi) to the south-east of Honiara in the Solomon Islands. Over the next two days the system moved westwards before it moved into the Australian basin during December 17, where it was later named Joy.

=== Tropical Cyclone Lisa ===
- Category 2 tropical cyclone (Australian scale)
- Tropical storm (SSHWS)
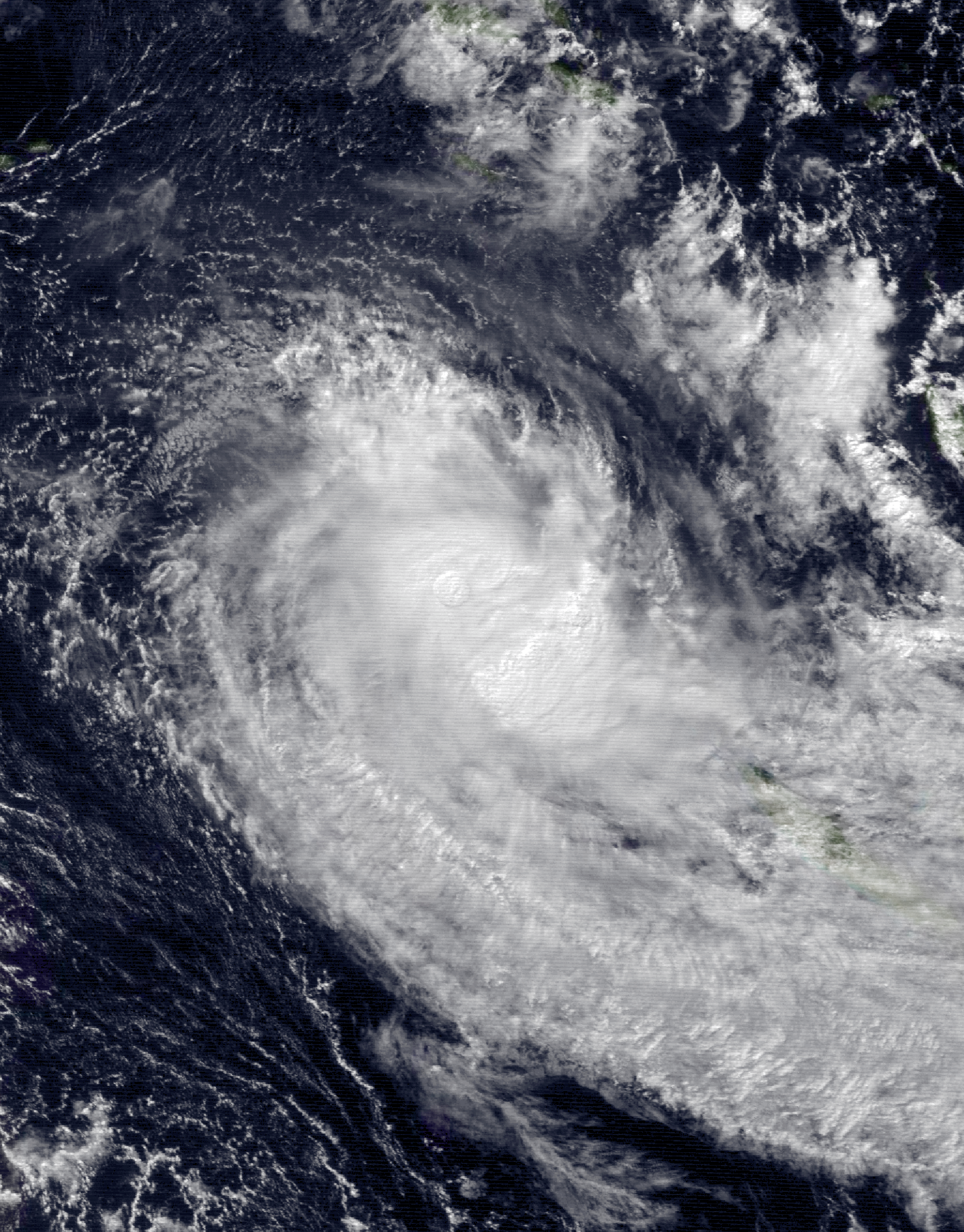
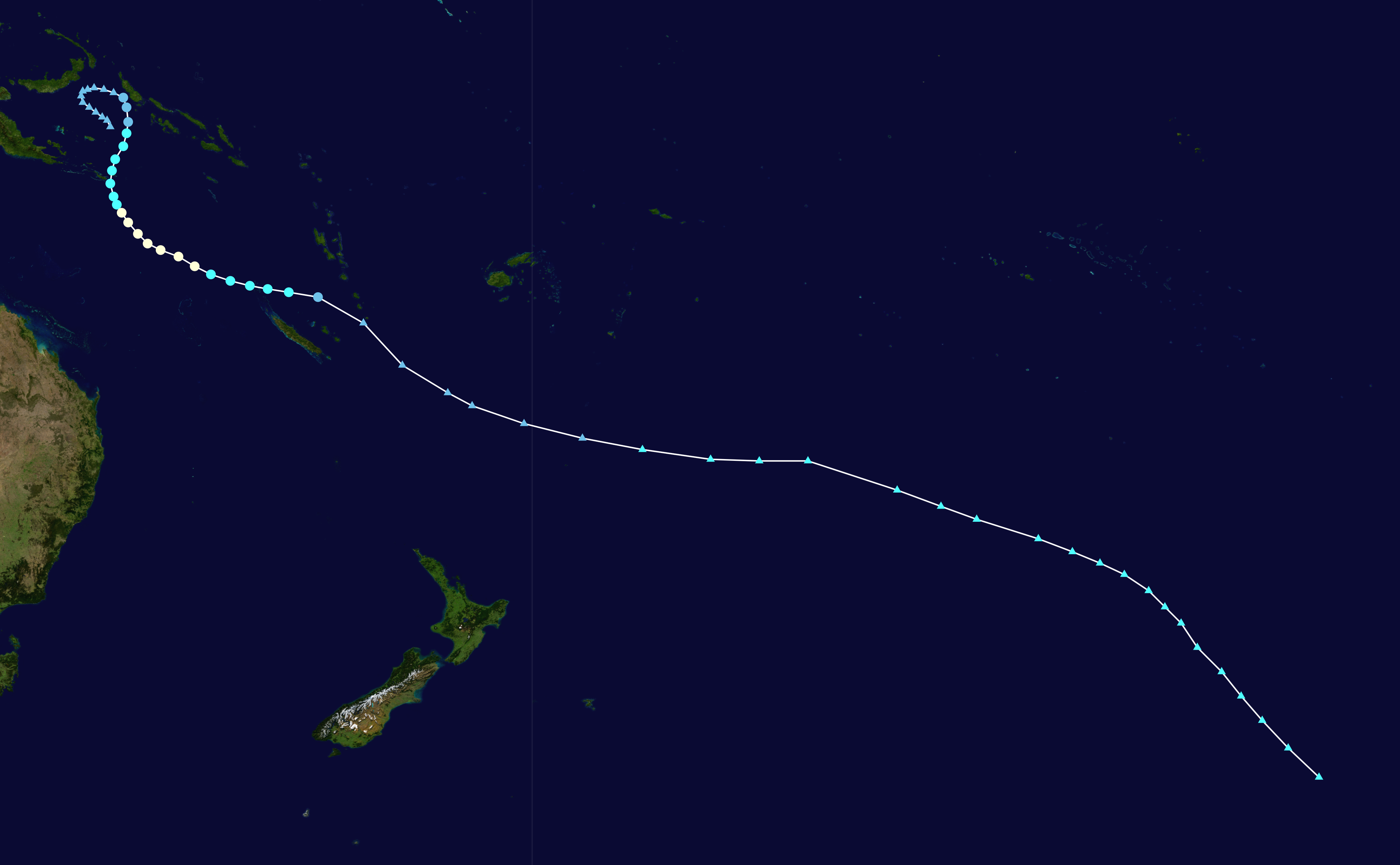
- Duration: May 11 (Entered basin) – May 13
- Peak intensity: 110 km/h (70 mph) (10-min); 975 hPa (mbar)

Tropical Cyclone Lisa moved into the South Pacific from the Australian region during May 11, while it was a Category 2 tropical cyclone with sustained wind speeds of 110 km/h (75 mph). Over the next couple of days, Lisa moved south-eastwards and passed in between the Vanuatuan islands of Tanna and Anatom as it gradually weakened and lost its tropical cyclone characteristics. Lisa's remnants subsequently started to deepen during May 14, under the influence of an upper level mid latitude trough and reached a secondary peak intensity of 100 km/h (65 mph). Over the next few days the system continued to move towards the southeast while slowly weakening, until it dissipated about 2,600 km (1,615 mi) to the east of Wellington, New Zealand. There were no reports of any significant damage associated with Lisa in Papua New Guinea, Vanuatu or the Solomon Islands.

=== Other systems ===
A weak gale force tropical cyclone affected Tonga between December 14–17. During March, three significant tropical depressions including 15P and 16P were observed within the Coral Sea/Australian region, which did not become tropical cyclones on the Australian scale but were subject to gale warnings. 15P was first noted on March 3, while it was located about 900 km (560 mi) to the east of the Solomon Islands and over the next couple of days subsequently moved south-westwards and out of the South Pacific basin during the next day. 16P was first noted on March 14, while located about 300 km (185 mi) to the southeast of Honiara in the Solomon Islands. Over the next couple of days the system moved towards the south-east before the JTWC designated the system 16P and initiated advisories on it during March 18 after it had moved into the South Pacific basin. Over the next couple of days the system moved towards the south-southeast before it turned towards the southwest and passed over New Caledonia on March 20, before it was last noted during the next day as it moved back into the Australian region.

== Season effects ==
This table lists all the storms that developed in the South Pacific to the east of longitude 160°E during the 1990–91 season. It includes their intensity on the Australian tropical cyclone intensity scale, duration, name, landfalls, deaths, and damages. All data is taken from the warning centers from the region unless otherwise noted.

1990–91 South Pacific cyclone season
Name	Dates active	Peak intensity			Areas affected	Damage (US$)	Deaths	Refs
Name	Dates active	Category	Wind speed	Pressure	Areas affected	Damage (US$)	Deaths	Refs
Sina	November 23 – December 4	Category 3 severe tropical cyclone	140 km/h (85 mph)	960 hPa (28.35 inHg)	Fiji, Tonga, Niue, Southern Cook Islands	$18.5 million	None	
Joy	December 15 – 17	Tropical depression	45 km/h (30 mph)	998 hPa (29.47 inHg)	Solomon Islands	Unknown	None	
15P	March 3 – 4	Tropical disturbance	Unknown	Unknown	Solomon Islands	None	None	
16P	March 15 – 21	Tropical depression	Unknown	1000 hPa (29.53 inHg)	New Caledonia	None	None	
Lisa	May 11 – 19	Category 2 tropical cyclone	110 km/h (70 mph)	975 hPa (28.79 inHg)	Solomon Islands, Vanuatu	None	None	
Season aggregates
5 systems	November 23, 1990 – May 19, 1991		140 km/h (85 mph)	960 hPa (28.35 inHg)		$18.5 million		

== See also ==
- List of off-season South Pacific tropical cyclones
- Tropical cyclones in 1990 and 1991
- Atlantic hurricane seasons: 1990, 1991
- Pacific hurricane seasons: 1990, 1991
- Pacific typhoon seasons: 1990, 1991
- North Indian Ocean cyclone seasons: 1990, 1991
