= Cyclone Sina =

South Pacific cyclone in 1990

Severe Tropical Cyclone Sina
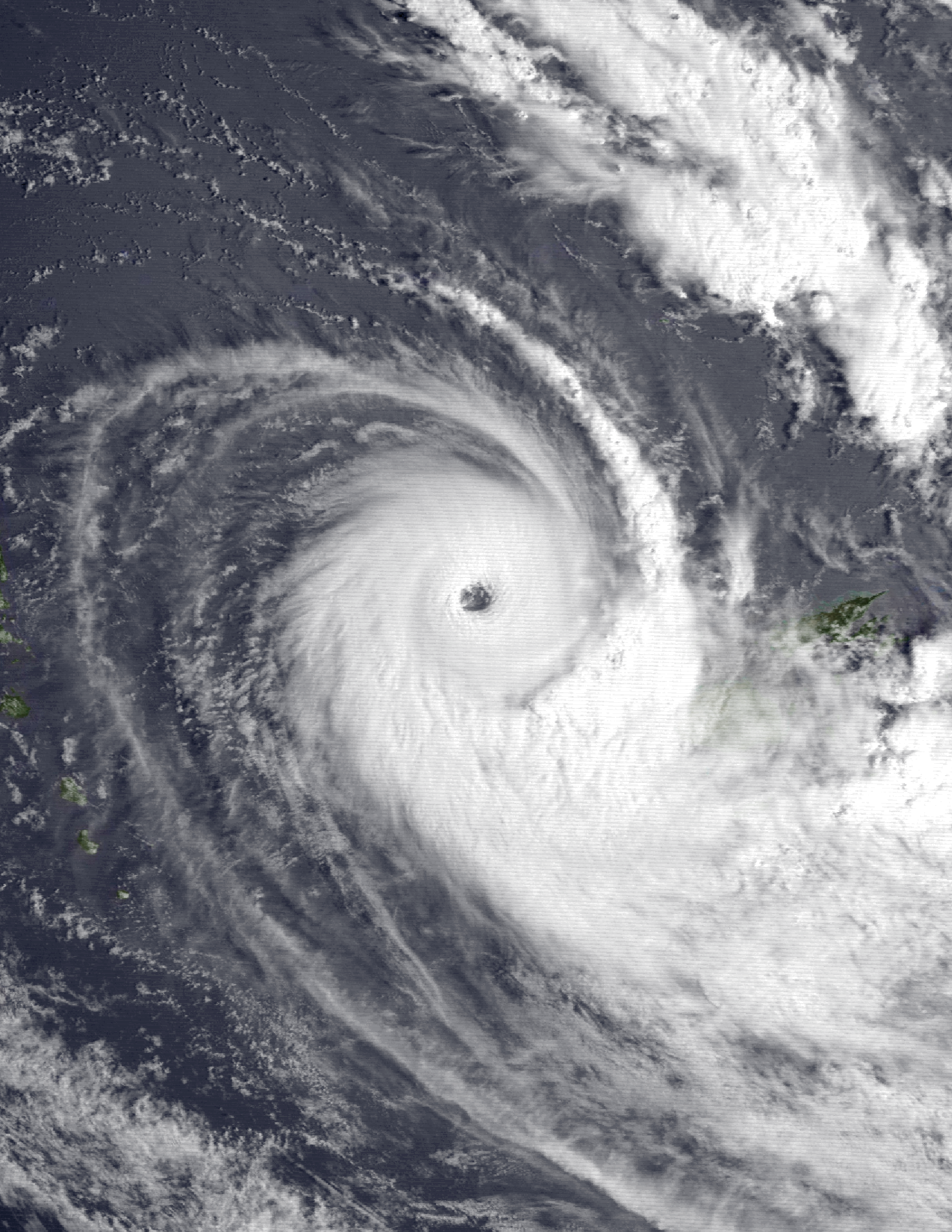
- Cyclone Sina approaching Fiji on November 26

Meteorological history
- Formed: November 20, 1990
- Extratropical: December 1, 1990
- Dissipated: December 4, 1990

Category 3 severe tropical cyclone
- 10-minute sustained (FMS)
- Highest winds: 140 km/h (85 mph)
- Lowest pressure: 960 hPa (mbar); 28.35 inHg

Category 4-equivalent tropical cyclone
- 1-minute sustained (SSHWS/JTWC)
- Highest winds: 230 km/h (145 mph)
- Lowest pressure: 916 hPa (mbar); 27.05 inHg

Overall effects
- Fatalities: None
- Damage: $18.5 million (1990 USD)
- Areas affected: Fiji; Tonga; Niue; Cook Islands
- IBTrACS
- Part of the 1990–91 South Pacific cyclone season

Severe Tropical Cyclone Sina was the only named tropical cyclone to develop within the South Pacific basin during the 1990–91 season. The system was first noted as a shallow depression within the South Pacific Convergence Zone to the west of Wallis Island. Over the next three days the system moved towards the west-northwest, before it was named Sina during November 24, after it had developed into a tropical cyclone. Over the next couple of days the system intensified further and developed an eye feature as it erratically moved towards Fiji. Sina subsequently peaked in intensity during November 26, before the system passed through the Fijian Islands over the next two days as it started to gradually weaken. Sina subsequently passed just to the north of Tongatapu in Tonga during November 29, before it passed about 160 km (100 mi) to the south of Niue and near the Southern Cook Islands during the next day. The system subsequently rapidly weakened and became an extratropical cyclone during December 1, before they were absorbed by an advancing trough of low pressure near 50°S on December 4.

The cyclone caused no deaths and over $18.5 million in damages, as it affected Fiji, Tonga, Niue and the Southern Cook Islands. Ahead of the system affecting Fiji, hundreds of people were evacuated from Fiji's outer island resorts to hotels on the mainland. High winds and heavy rain forced the closure of several local airports and the main Nadi International Airport. As Sina moved through the archipelago, the system destroyed or damaged houses and other building structures, while bringing down electric and telephone lines and uprooting trees. The system also washed away a railway bridge on Vanua Levu that was used to take sugar cane to Labasa's mills, leaving growers no choice but to go through the village of Korowiri. However, the workers refused to go into their fields unless they had police protection to go through the village, after Methodists from the local church attacked a group of growers for working on Sundays in defiance of Fiji's Sunday Observance Decree. Within Tonga only minor damage to weak structures, trees, banana plantations, electric and telephone lines was recorded. Within both Niue and the Southern Cook Islands only minor damage to crops and structures was reported.

== Meteorological history ==
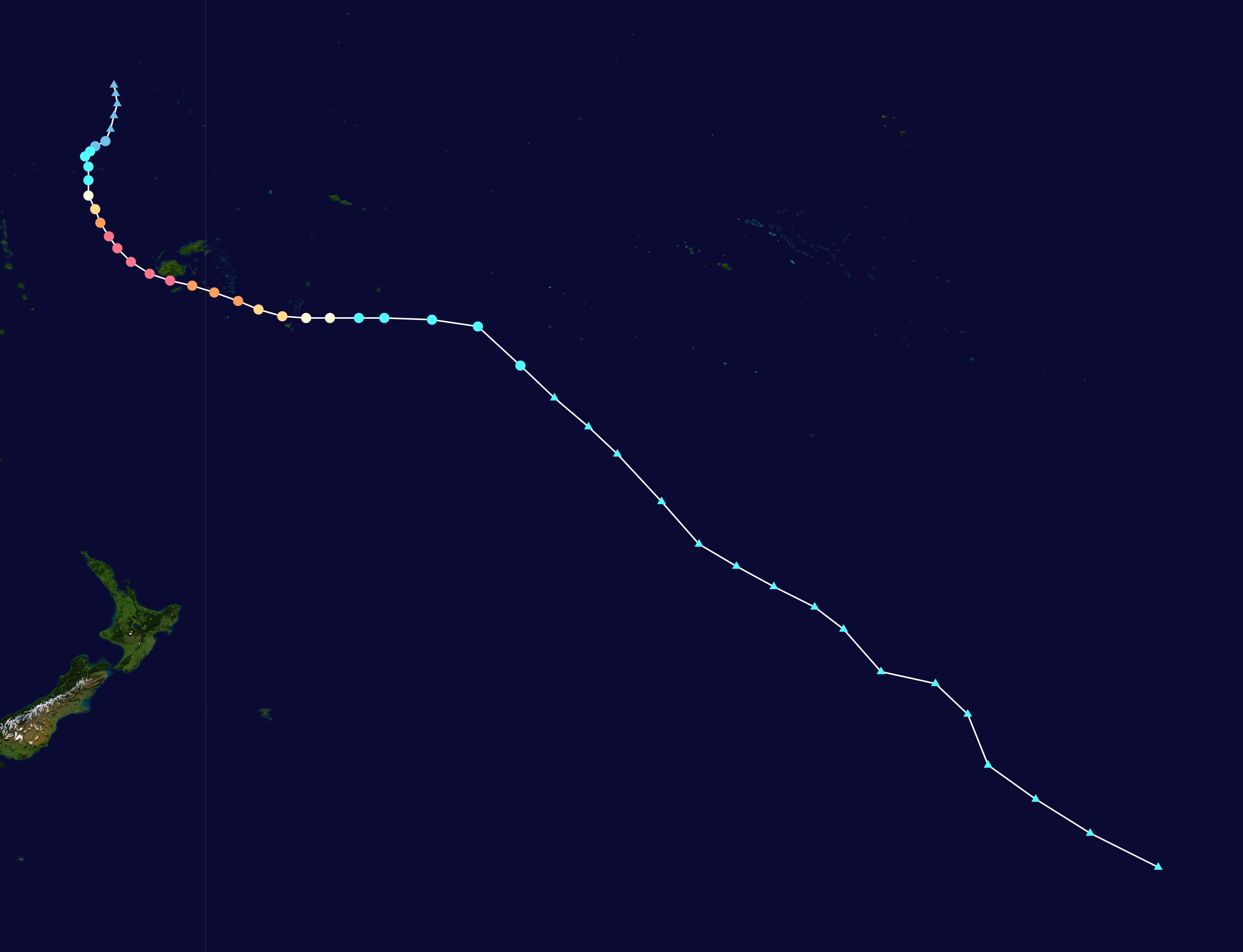
Map plotting the storm's track and intensity, according to the Saffir–Simpson scale Map key Saffir–Simpson scale Tropical depression (≤38 mph, ≤62 km/h) Tropical storm (39–73 mph, 63–118 km/h) Category 1 (74–95 mph, 119–153 km/h) Category 2 (96–110 mph, 154–177 km/h) Category 3 (111–129 mph, 178–208 km/h) Category 4 (130–156 mph, 209–251 km/h) Category 5 (≥157 mph, ≥252 km/h) Unknown Storm type Tropical cyclone Subtropical cyclone Extratropical cyclone, remnant low, tropical disturbance, or monsoon depression

On November 20, the Fiji Meteorological Service (FMS) started to monitor a Tropical Depression that had developed within the South Pacific Convergence Zone to the west of Wallis Island. Over the next two days, the system moved towards the west-northwest and the Fijian dependency of Rotuma, before the Depression's chances of developing further increased on November 23, as upper outflow over the system became established. During the following day, the United States Joint Typhoon Warning Center (JTWC) classified the system as Tropical Cyclone 03P and initiated advisories after atmospheric convection surrounding the system had organized further. Later that day, the FMS named the system Sina after the depression had developed into a category 1 tropical cyclone on the Australian tropical cyclone intensity scale, while it was located about 425 km (265 mi) to the northwest of Rotuma. During November 25, the cyclone continued to intensify and developed an eye as it moved erratically towards the west-southwest and performed a small clockwise loop. Early on November 26, the FMS reported that Sina had become a Category 3 Severe Tropical Cyclone. At around this time, the JTWC reported that Sina intensified into a Category 1 tropical cyclone on the Saffir-Simpson hurricane wind scale (SSHWS).

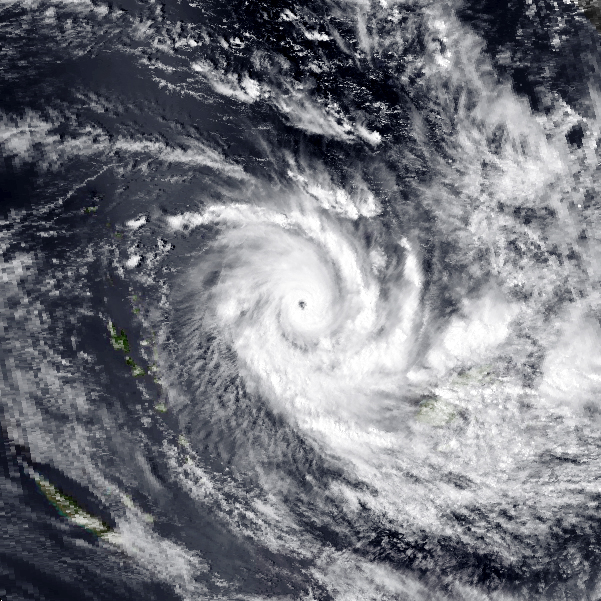
Sina intensifying on November 26

During that day, Sina's eye became very distinct on satellite imagery. As the system intensified and came under the influence of a changeable upper level steering flow which resulted in Sina moving erratically towards the southeast and Fiji. Later that day the FMS reported that the system had peaked as a category 3 severe tropical cyclone, with 10-minute sustained windspeeds of 75 kn (140 km/h; 85 mph). The JTWC subsequently reported early the next day that Sina had peaked with 1-minute sustained wind speeds of 125 kn (230 km/h; 145 mph), which made it equivalent to a category 4 hurricane on the SSHWS. During that day, Sina remained at its peak intensity as it moved towards the east-southeast and started to be observed on the Nadi radar. Later that day, as the system started to gradually weaken, it passed about 40 km (25 mi) to the south of Viti Levu before it passed over the island groups of Vatulele and Moala and the Southern Lau Islands during November 28. During that day, the system moved across the 180th meridian, which prompted the JTWC to issue its final warning on Sina and pass the responsibility for warning the United States Government to the Naval Western Oceanography Center.

Early on November 29, Sina weakened into a category two tropical cyclone on the Australian scale just before it passed to the north of Tongatapu in Tonga. During that day, as the system moved eastwards towards the Southern Cook Islands and gradually weakened further, the NWOC issued its final advisory on Sina while estimating that it was equivalent to a category one hurricane on the SSHWS. Early on November 30, the system passed about 160 km (100 mi) to the south of Niue, before it recurved sharply towards the south-southeast later that day as it approached the Southern Cook Islands. The system subsequently started to rapidly weaken under the influence of strong vertical wind shear and cooler sea surface temperatures. The FMS subsequently passed the primary warning responsibility for Sina to the New Zealand Meteorological Service as the cyclone crossed 25°S, who quickly reported that the system had lost its tropical characteristics and had become an extratropical depression. Over the next couple of days, Sina's extratropical remnants maintained a south-eastward track before they were absorbed by an advancing trough of low pressure near 50°S on December 4.

== Preparations, impact and aftermath ==
Cyclone Sina affected Fiji, Tonga, Niue, and the Southern Cook Islands and was responsible for damages totaling over $18.5 million. The system had initially appeared to threaten the Solomon Islands and Vanuatu as it performed a small clockwise loop and moved erratically towards the west-southwest during November 25. After this usage of the name, Sina was retired from the tropical cyclone naming lists for the region.

=== Fiji ===
Late on November 25, the FMS issued a tropical cyclone alert for Fiji, while the system was located about 665 km (415 mi) to the northwest of the country. During the next day, a gale-force wind warning was issued for the western half of Viti Levu, the Yasawa and Mamanuca island groups, which was later upgraded to a storm warning while a gale warning was also issued for the rest of Viti Levu. These storm warnings were briefly dropped early on November 27, when the storm appeared to be moving away from the country, but as Sina came within range of the Nadi radar, it became apparent that southern Fiji would be directly hit by the system. As a result, hurricane warnings were issued for Vatulele, Kadavu and smaller nearby islands, while storm warnings were re-issued for the western half of Viti Levu and the Mamanuca island group. Over the next day as the cyclone approached, hurricane, storm and gale warnings were revised to cover various islands within the Koro and Southern Lau island groups, before all warnings were cancelled on November 28, as Sina moved away from Fiji.

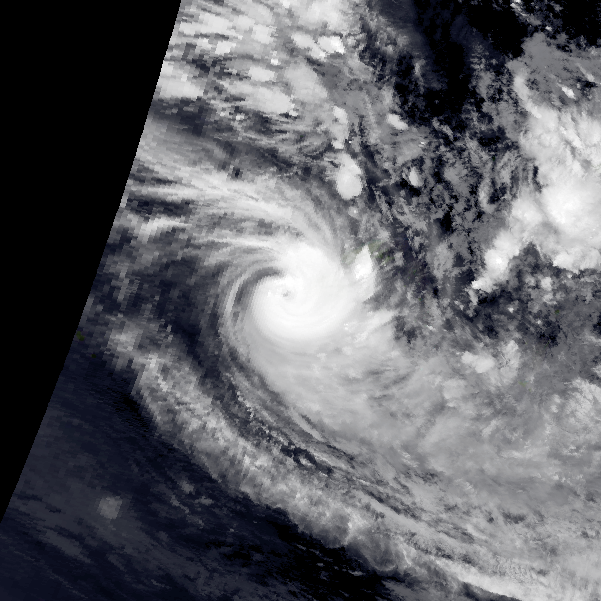
Sina passing to the south of Fiji on November 27

Ahead of Sina affecting the Fijian islands, from November 27 until November 29, with wind gusts of up to 175 km/h (110 mph), hundreds of people were evacuated from Fiji's outer island resorts to hotels on the mainland. As the cyclone affected Fiji high winds and heavy rain forced the closure of several local airports and the Nadi International Airport for around 20 hours. As the cyclone moved towards the east-southeast between November 27–28, it passed near to or over the south-western coast of Viti Levu, Vatulele, Bequa, Northern Kadavu and various islands within the Moala and Southern Lau island groups and caused some coastal erosion. As it moved through the archipelago, the system destroyed or damaged houses and other building structures, while bringing down electric and telephone lines and uprooting trees. The system also severely affected crops and vegetation including sugar cane and pine forests, however the extent of the damage was limited by the fact that many of the crops had already been harvested.

On December 7, the Australian Government via the international development bureau and Air Pacific provided emergency shelter materials, including tarpaulins, plastic sheeting and rope, after an appeal for international assistance was made by the Fijian government. After the cyclone damaged resorts were quickly repaired, while the Fijian government launched an international advertisement campaign for the islands with discounted airfares. Overall Sina caused over $F26 million ($US18.5 million) worth of damage to the Fijian islands, with most of the damage accounted for by losses to agriculture, sugar cane, and pine forests. After Cyclone Sina had washed away a railway bridge on Vanua Levu that was used to take sugar cane to Labasa's mills, growers had no choice but to go through the village of Korowiri. However, the workers refused to go into their fields unless they had police protection to go through the village, after Methodists from the local church attacked a group of growers for working on Sundays in defiance of Fiji's Sunday Observance Decree. As a result, sugar cane that had been damaged by Sina was left rotting in Fiji's fields until the Fiji Sugar Corporation ordered that a temporary bridge be built to bypass the village.

=== Tonga ===
Late on November 27, as Sina affected the Fijian island of Viti Levu, the FMS issued a tropical cyclone alert for the Tongatapu, Haʻapai and Vavaʻu groups of islands. During the next day, the alert for Vavaʻu was cancelled, while gale and storm-force wind warnings were issued for the Haʻapai and the Tongatapu island groups. The system subsequently moved in between the Tongatapu and Haʻapai groups of islands, where sustained wind speeds of up to 96 km/h (60 mph) and wind gusts of up to 139 km/h (86 mph) were recorded at the Nukuʻalofa weather station. Parts of the Tongan capital city, Nukuʻalofa, were left without power after electric lines were brought down, while several homes were partially damaged after the roofs lost their iron. Overall, only minor damage to weak structures, trees, banana plantations, power and telephone lines was recorded within the island nation.

=== Other island nations ===
During November 29, strong wind warnings were issued for Niue as the island experienced marginal gale-force winds from the system, as it passed about 185 km (115 mi) to the south of the island. High seas salt spray and waves caused some damage to crops and the island's wharf. They also washed away two temporary roads that were installed after Cyclone Ofa had affected the island earlier in the year.

Early on November 30, as the system moved towards the east-southeast, a gale warning was issued for the Cook Islands of Rarotonga and Mangaia, while issuing strong wind warnings and tropical cyclone alerts for the rest of the Southern Islands. The warnings were subsequently maintained until later that day, as Sina spared the Cook Islands its major effects and re-curved sharply towards the south-southeast. Only minor damage to shallow rooted crops and weak structures was reported, after high seas and gale-force winds buffeted the northern side of Rarotonga.

== See also ==
- Cyclone Evan
