= Cyclone Joy =

Category 4 Australian region cyclone in 1990

Severe Tropical Cyclone Joy
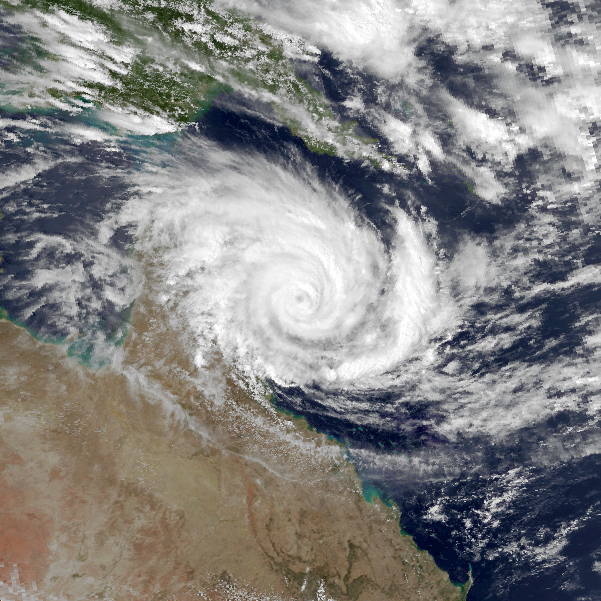
- Cyclone Joy approaching Australia on 22 December

Meteorological history
- Formed: 15 December 1990
- Dissipated: 27 December 1990

Category 4 severe tropical cyclone
- 10-minute sustained (BOM)
- Highest winds: 175 km/h (110 mph)
- Lowest pressure: 940 hPa (mbar); 27.76 inHg

Category 3-equivalent tropical cyclone
- 1-minute sustained (SSHWS/JTWC)
- Highest winds: 185 km/h (115 mph)
- Lowest pressure: 954 hPa (mbar); 28.17 inHg

Overall effects
- Fatalities: 6
- Damage: $234 million (1990 USD)
- Areas affected: Queensland
- IBTrACS
- Part of the 1990–91 South Pacific and Australian region cyclone seasons

Severe Tropical Cyclone Joy struck Australia in late 1990, causing the third highest floods on record in Rockhampton, Queensland. This cyclone began as a weak tropical low near the Solomon Islands, and initially moved westward. On 18 December, it was named Joy, becoming the 2nd named storm of the 1990–91 Australian region cyclone season. After turning southwest, Joy developed a well-defined eye and strengthened to maximum sustained winds of 165 km/h (103 mph) while approaching Cairns in Far North Queensland. Brushing the city with strong winds, the cyclone soon weakened and turned southeast. Joy later curved back southwest, making landfall near Townsville, Queensland on 26 December. It dissipated the next day; remnant moisture continued as torrential rainfall over Queensland for two weeks.

While drifting offshore northeastern Australia, the cyclone produced wind gusts as high as 124 km/h (77 mph) in Cairns, strong enough to cause power outages. In Mackay, a tornado spawned by Joy damaged 40 homes, while torrential rainfall just south of the city peaked at over 2 metres (6.6 ft). 110 inches of rain was recorded in the Upper Pioneer Valley for the duration of the event. Most storm-associated damage was wrought by severe flooding, which persisted for weeks in hardest-hit locations. Rains significantly increased water levels on 10 rivers, among them the Fitzroy River, which discharged about 18 trillion litres (4.8×10^{12} US gallons) of freshwater into Keppel Bay over 25 days. In turn, the Great Barrier Reef suffered biological damage from coral bleaching and decreased salinity. The Fitzroy River rose to a 9.30-metre (30.5 ft) peak at Rockhampton, forcing thousands to evacuate homes; some stranded individuals could only obtain food by helicopter. Elsewhere in Australia, storm moisture alleviated drought conditions and diminished fires near Sydney. Overall, Joy killed six people and caused A$300 million in damage ($234 million USD). (Note: All damage totals are listed in 1990 values of their respective currencies.) Afterwards, the Queensland government issued a disaster declaration for about 30% of the state, and the name Joy was retired from the list of tropical cyclone names.

== Meteorological history ==
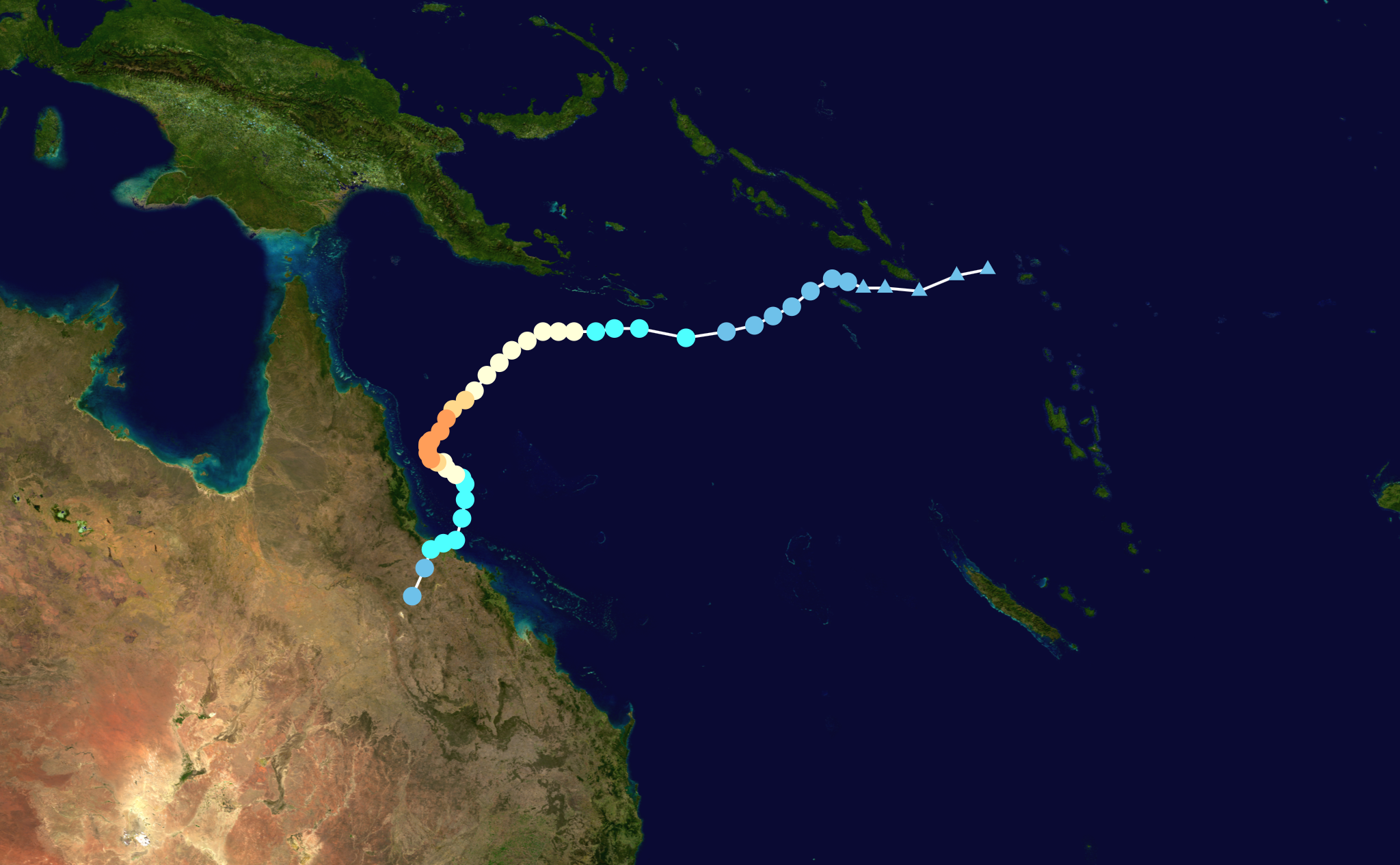
Map plotting the storm's track and intensity, according to the Saffir–Simpson scale Map key Saffir–Simpson scale Tropical depression (≤38 mph, ≤62 km/h) Tropical storm (39–73 mph, 63–118 km/h) Category 1 (74–95 mph, 119–153 km/h) Category 2 (96–110 mph, 154–177 km/h) Category 3 (111–129 mph, 178–208 km/h) Category 4 (130–156 mph, 209–251 km/h) Category 5 (≥157 mph, ≥252 km/h) Unknown Storm type Tropical cyclone Subtropical cyclone Extratropical cyclone, remnant low, tropical disturbance, or monsoon depression

In mid-December, a monsoon trough persisted along the west Pacific Ocean, spawning a pair of tropical disturbances both north and south of the equator. In the northwestern Pacific Ocean, the system became Typhoon Russ. On 15 December, a tropical low formed east of the Solomon Islands. During the next few days, the system passed south of the country while slowly organizing. On 18 December, the Australia Bureau of Meteorology began tracking it, naming the system "Joy" after it upgraded the low to tropical cyclone status. A meteorologist from Darwin later apologised that the name was used so close to Christmas, although "Joy" was predetermined by a rotating list of list of tropical cyclone names. Also on 18 December, the Joint Typhoon Warning Center (JTWC) (Note: The Joint Typhoon Warning Center is a joint United States Navy – United States Air Force task force that issues tropical cyclone warnings for the western Pacific Ocean and other regions.) began issuing warnings on the storm, labeling it as Tropical Cyclone 06P. With a ridge to the south, Joy continued generally west-southwestward.

While in its origins, Joy was experiencing upper-level wind shear, but as it approached the jet stream while turning to the southwest, conditions became more favourable for intensification. The storm quickly intensified, reaching the equivalent of a minimal hurricane on 21 December. At 00:00 UTC on 23 December, the Bureau estimated Joy reached peak 10-minute sustained winds of 165 km/h (103 mph), which made the system a category 4 severe tropical cyclone on the Australian tropical cyclone intensity scale. Around the same time, the JTWC also estimated the same peak winds, but sustained over one minute. Joy developed an eye about 50 km (31 mi) in diameter with concentric eyewalls. The storm began moving slowly off the northeast coast of Australia, passing within 100 km (62 mi) of Cairns, and the motion shifted to a southeast drift. A building high pressure area to the south caused the change in movement, and there were initial concerns the storm would loop to the west and affect Cairns again. Drier air caused Joy to weaken gradually from its peak to the equivalent of a strong tropical storm. At 06:00 UTC on 26 December, after turning back to the southwest, the storm made landfall near Townsville, Queensland, with winds estimated at 95 km/h (59 mph). That day, the JTWC discontinued advisories, and on 27 December, Joy dissipated inland over Queensland. A remnant system persisted into early January, producing continued rainfall across Queensland.

== Preparations ==
Before Joy struck Australia, residents evacuated from resorts on Fitzroy and Green islands by boat or plane. Officials set up evacuation centres on the mainland and put the Australian Army on standby. The military evacuated its fleet of Blackhawk helicopters inland from RAAF Base Townsville. A man required rescue from Hope Island by helicopter in advance of the storm. The threat of the storm caused shopping malls and the airport near Cairns to close just before Christmas. Several flights were diverted or delayed, stranding about 1,000 travellers, many of whom spent Christmas in the airport. Road travel was banned in some areas of northeastern Queensland, and residents in Port Douglas were forced to evacuate. The Flood Warning Centre in Brisbane issued 192 flood warnings related to Cyclone Joy in December and January, beginning on 23 December. Most of the warnings were related to increased water levels along rivers.

== Impact ==
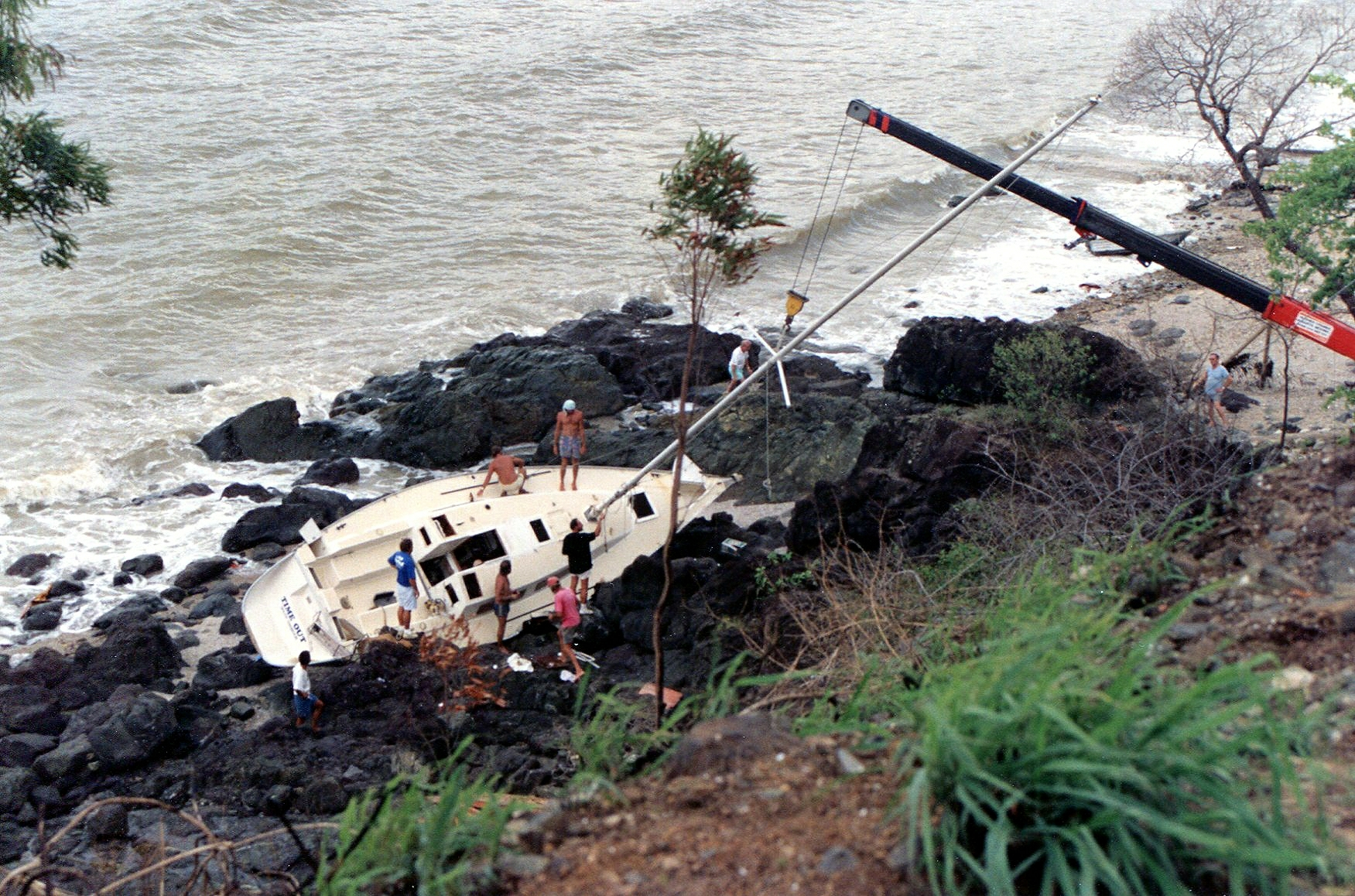
A yacht washed aground at Airlie Beach, Queensland, in the Whitsunday Region

Joy passed within 80 km (50 mi) of Green Island off the coast of Queensland, generating a wind gust of 180 km/h (110 mph). Heavy damage occurred on other islands, and one person drowned while surfing in Mackay. A boat became disabled during the storm, forcing its four occupants to ride out the storm for four days on Cockermouth Island until they were rescued by helicopter. Several boats were damaged in the Whitsunday Islands.

The storm and its remnants dropped heavy rainfall throughout Queensland for about two weeks, totaling over 2 m (6.6 ft) south of Mackay and over 1 m (3.3 ft) between Bowen and St. Lawrence. The highest daily total was 458 mm (18.0 in) about 30 km (19 mi) west of Sarina. Three day rainfall totals around when Joy made landfall included 831 mm (32.7 in) in Blue Mountain and 506 mm (19.9 in) in Waitara. Rainfall continued through the region through March 1991, resulting in the third largest flood in the region in over 100 years.

Overall, Cyclone Joy killed six people, including five in river flooding, and caused about A$300 million in damage ($234 million USD). (Note: The damage total was originally reported in 1990 Australian dollars. The exchange rate in 1990 was 1.281 Australian dollars to 1 United States dollar.) While stalling off the northeast Australia coast, Joy produced widespread gale force winds, with gusts to 124 km/h (77 mph) recorded at Cairns. After the winds knocked over trees, causing power and phone outages, storm damage cut the water supply and briefly isolated Cairns due to debris blocking roads. An outer rainband struck Mackay as the storm moved ashore, spawning a tornado that damaged 40 houses, destroyed two others, and damaged a caravan park. The windstorm was unexpected there, and damage in Mackay was estimated at A$10 million. Flooding from rainfall affected about 90% of the city, which restricted train travel, causing three trains to be canceled and stranding hundreds of travelers. In Port Douglas, Joy produced an inconsequential storm surge of 0.5 m (1.6 ft). In Innisfail, the cyclone ruined 90% of the town's crops, and over 20 houses sustained wind damage. Banana farmers in the Cairns region lost a combined total of 1.2 million bunches of the fruit. Collectively, crop damage totalled over A$70 million, mostly to sugar cane and banana. About 30,000 head of livestock were killed in the region.

Rain from Cyclone Joy caused rampant flooding across the region, significantly raising water levels along 10 rivers. The Fitzroy River alone swelled to inundate about 4,000 km^{2} (1,500 mi^{2}) of terrain. Heightened discharge caused extensive erosion along river channels that removed about 18 million tonnes (20,000,000 short tons) of soil and vegetation. In late December, the Pioneer River at Mackay peaked at 7.6 m (25 ft), safely within the confines of its levee system. The town of Giru endured flooding of streets and houses, which would reoccur several times through February. High water levels along the Tully River flooded a portion of the Bruce Highway. In the second week of January, the Herbert River peaked at 11.32 m (37.1 ft), causing residential flooding in Ingham. Elsewhere in Australia, moisture from the storm eased ongoing bushfires near Sydney.

At Rockhampton, the Fitzroy River rose to an initial peak of 9.15 m (30.0 ft), temporarily dropped, and rose to a final peak of 9.30 m (30.5 ft) in early January 1991, the third highest since records began in 1860, after floods in 1918 and 1954. Inflow from several tributaries ensured the Fitzroy River near Rockhampton remained over 8 m (26 ft) for 13 days. The river entered 350 houses in what was the city's most damaging flood since 1954. The town was isolated for about three weeks after flooding covered roads, railways, and the airport. Before the worst of the flooding, Acting Premier Tom Burns declared a state of disaster for Rockhampton, giving local police the authority to force individuals living in flood zones to leave their homes. Ultimately, over 1,000 people sought higher ground, staying mainly at the houses of friends or relatives, or at nearby schools. In an attempt to mitigate damage, 150 volunteers filled 43,000 sandbags to protect properties. Nearby, residents rescued about 100 dogs from an affected kennel.

Storm-related flooding damaged portions of the Great Barrier Reef through coral bleaching. Over 25 days, the Fitzroy River discharged about 18 trillion litres (4.8×10^{12} US gallons) of water into Keppel Bay, reaching the Great Barrier Reef in early January and causing a drop in salinity levels. On Great Keppel Island, about 85% of shallow-water reefs died. Reef damage also occurred in the Whitsunday Islands. The discharge from the Fitzroy River affected various islands and coral groups, depending on the offshore wind direction and ocean current. The water flow washed a group of freshwater turtles from the mainland to North West Island, though they were later returned to their native habitat. The influx of freshwater reduced commercial fishing productivity by 30%.

== Aftermath ==
Workers in Cairns had restored power and water supplies within a few days of Joy's passage. After the initial flooding from Joy ended, there was additional rainfall in February 1991 that caused flooding across the region. Residual flooding cost the coal industry about A$60 million due to loss of production and hindered exporting. While Rockhampton was still isolated by flooding, a helicopter airdropped food to hundreds of stranded families, after the town experienced food and water shortages. Transportation to Rockhampton was not normalised until 20 January, when the airport and incoming roads were reopened. The city of Rockhampton later created a flood plain management policy as a result of the effects from Joy. The floods helped fill the drainage basin of the Peter Faust Dam within a few weeks, speeding up a process which would have otherwise taken several years. Months after the storm, the Queensland National Parks and Wildlife Service collected reports on environmental impacts from the flooding; they included some beneficial aspects such as new locations for animal breeding, and alleviation of drought conditions. The Queensland government upgraded a portion of the Bruce Highway near Rockhampton to reduce flooding in similar storms.

Officials declared about a third of the state of Queensland as a disaster area following Cyclone Joy, directing state funds toward recovery efforts. The Queensland government provided monetary assistance to eligible families in the disaster zone and offered special loans to farmers affected by the storm. The federal government agreed to contribute 75% of overall relief costs. Following the cyclone's impacts in Australia, the name Joy was later retired by the World Meteorological Organization.

== See also ==
- List of retired Australian cyclone names
- Cyclone Justin—brought severe flooding to Queensland and Papua New Guinea
- Cyclone Aivu—caused considerable damage in areas near Ayr, Queensland
- Cyclone Ita—followed a similar path to Joy, and had a similar satellite presentation at peak intensity
