= 1991 Pacific typhoon season =

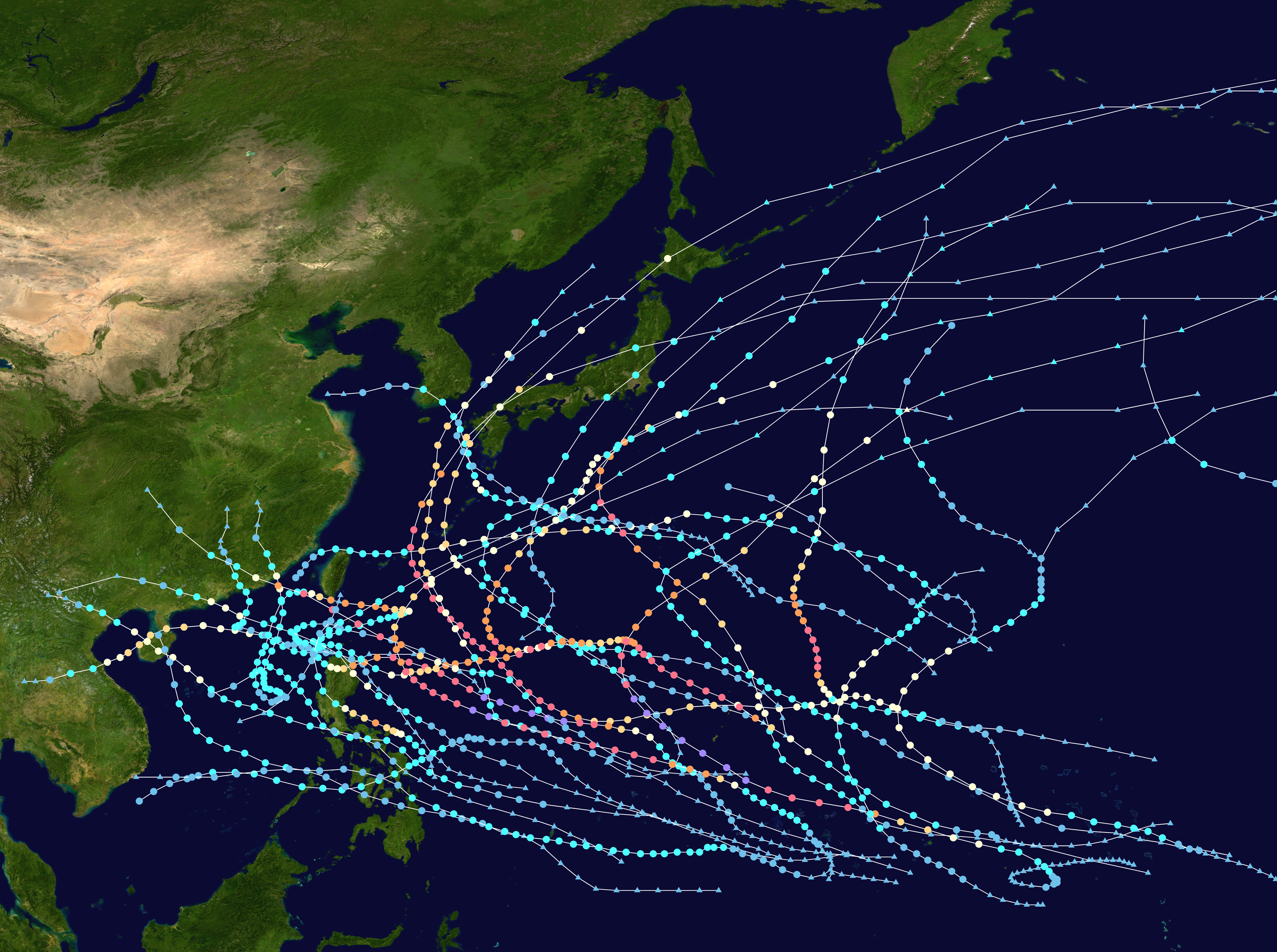
- Season summary map

Seasonal boundaries
- First system formed: March 5, 1991
- Last system dissipated: December 5, 1991

Strongest storm
- Name: Yuri
  - Maximum winds: 220 km/h (140 mph) (10-minute sustained)
  - Lowest pressure: 895 hPa (mbar)

Seasonal statistics
- Total depressions: 39
- Total storms: 30
- Typhoons: 17
- Very strong typhoons: 9
- Violent typhoons: 2
- ACE: 414.3 units
- Total fatalities: 5,964 total
- Total damage: $17.44 billion (1991 USD)

Related articles
- 1991 Atlantic hurricane season; 1991 Pacific hurricane season; 1991 North Indian Ocean cyclone season

The 1991 Pacific typhoon season was a slightly above-average season with 29 tropical storms, 17 typhoons and five super typhoons forming. It was quite a catastrophic season – Typhoon Yunya impacted the Philippines in mid June while in the same time experiencing a volcanic eruption, Typhoon Mireille severely impacting Japan, which became known for being the costliest typhoon on record until it was surpassed by Typhoon Doksuri in 2023, and Tropical Storm Thelma on November which became one of the deadliest storms to strike the Philippines, killing at least over 5,000 people. The season was deadliest since 1975.

It ran year-round in 1991, although most tropical cyclones tended to form in the northwestern Pacific Ocean between May and November 1991. These dates conventionally delimit the period of each year when most tropical cyclones form in the northwestern Pacific Ocean. However, the first named storm, Sharon, did not develop until. March 8. The last named storm, Zelda, dissipated on December 5.

The scope of this article is limited to the Pacific Ocean, north of the equator and west of the International Date Line. Storms that form east of the date line and north of the equator are called hurricanes; see 1991 Pacific hurricane season. Tropical Storms formed in the entire west pacific basin were assigned a name by the Joint Typhoon Warning Center. Tropical depressions in this basin have the "W" suffix added to their number. Tropical depressions that enter or form in the Philippine area of responsibility are assigned a name by the Philippine Atmospheric, Geophysical and Astronomical Services Administration or PAGASA. This can often result in the same storm having two names.

== Systems ==
Costliest known Pacific typhoon seasons
Rank	Total damages	Season
1	$38.54 billion	2019
2	$38.06 billion	2023
3	$30.59 billion	2018
4	$29.62 billion	2024
5	$26.45 billion	2013
6	$21.05 billion	2012
7	$18.77 billion	2004
8	$17.44 billion	1991
9	$17.18 billion	2000
10	$16.96 billion	2016

32 tropical cyclones formed this year in the Western Pacific, of which 30 became tropical storms. 17 storms reached typhoon intensity, of which 5 reached super typhoon strength.

=== Severe Tropical Storm Sharon (Auring) ===
- Severe tropical storm (JMA)
- Tropical storm (SSHWS)
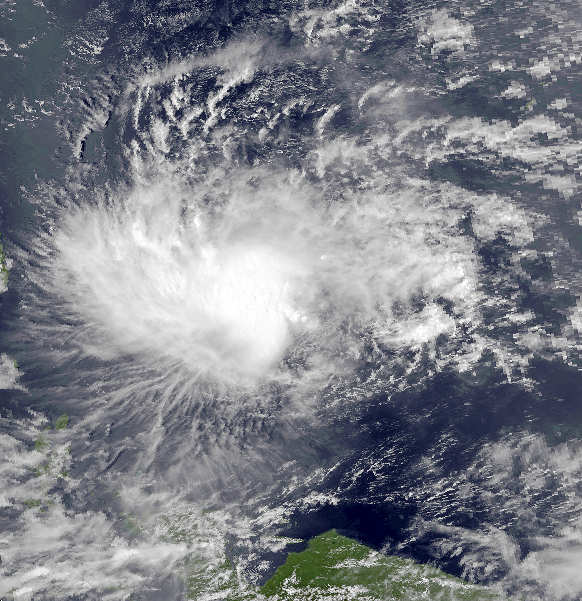
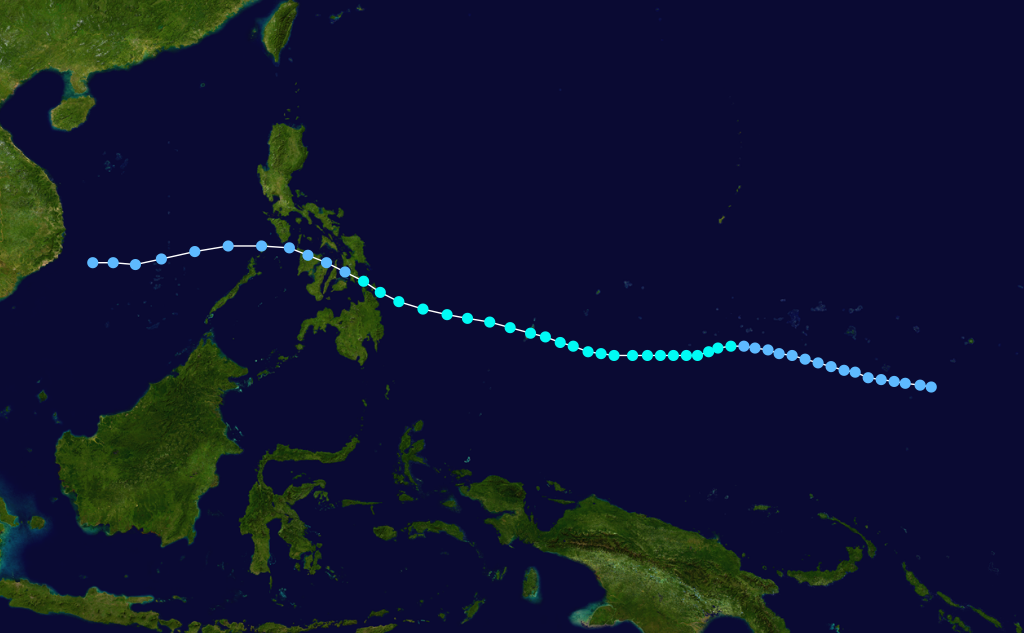
- Duration: March 5 – March 16
- Peak intensity: 95 km/h (60 mph) (10-min); 985 hPa (mbar)

Severe Tropical Storm Sharon existed between March 5 and March 16, 1991. Sharon hit the Philippines.

=== Typhoon Tim ===
- Typhoon (JMA)
- Category 1 typhoon (SSHWS)
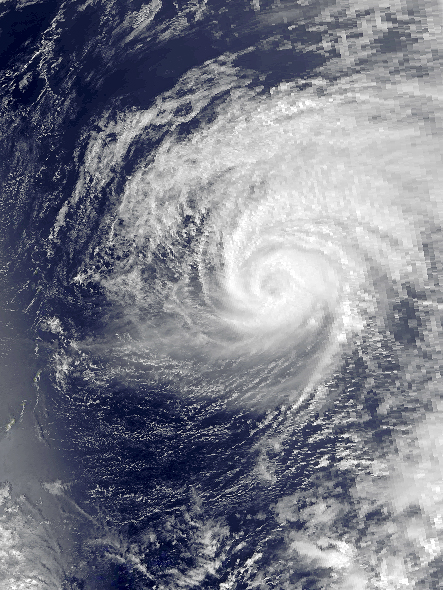
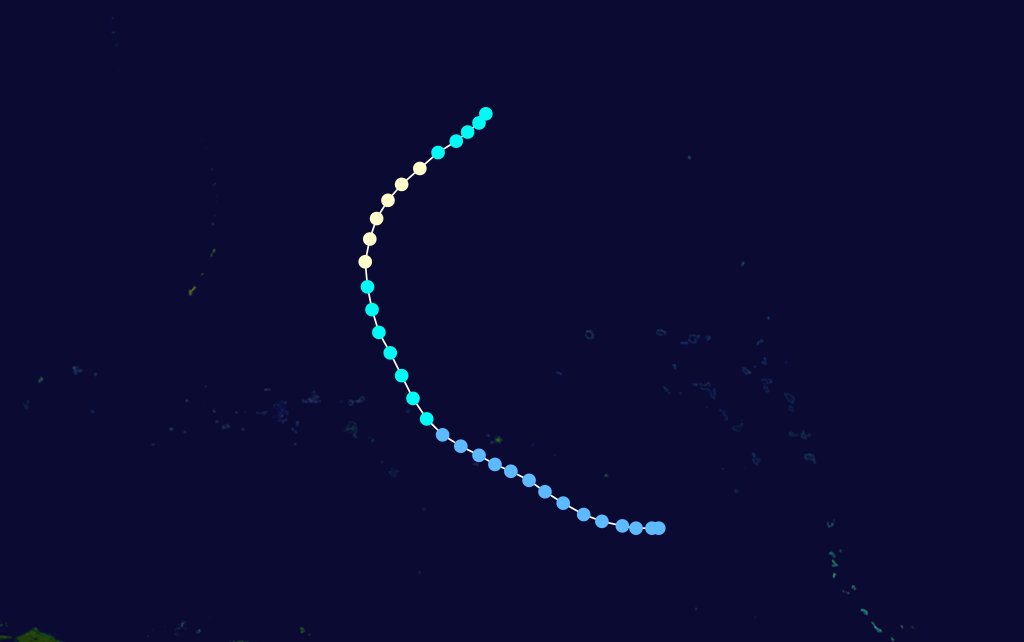
- Duration: March 20 – March 27
- Peak intensity: 120 km/h (75 mph) (10-min); 970 hPa (mbar)

On March 17, a cluster of thunderstorms grouped together which formed a low pressure area far east of the Mariana islands. The low pressure area rapidly intensified and became a tropical storm 4 days after formation. Favorable conditions allowed the system to continue to intensify into a Category 1 typhoon. High wind shear on March 25 caused the system to weakened, and it transitioned into an extratropical cyclone.

=== Tropical Storm Vanessa (Bebeng) ===
- Tropical storm (JMA)
- Tropical storm (SSHWS)
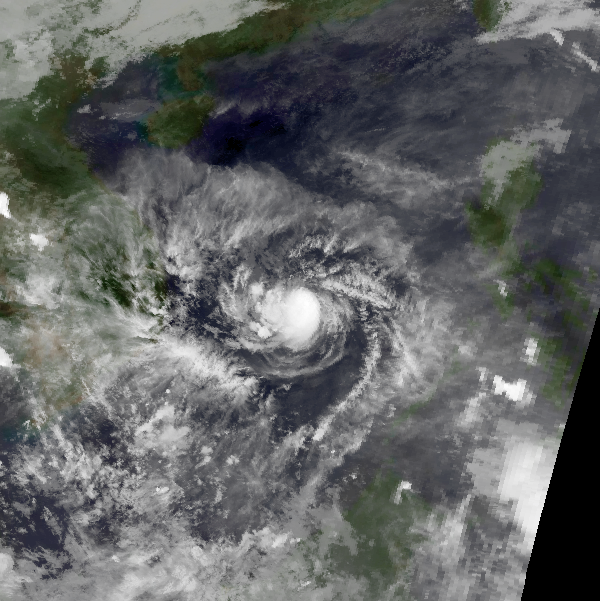
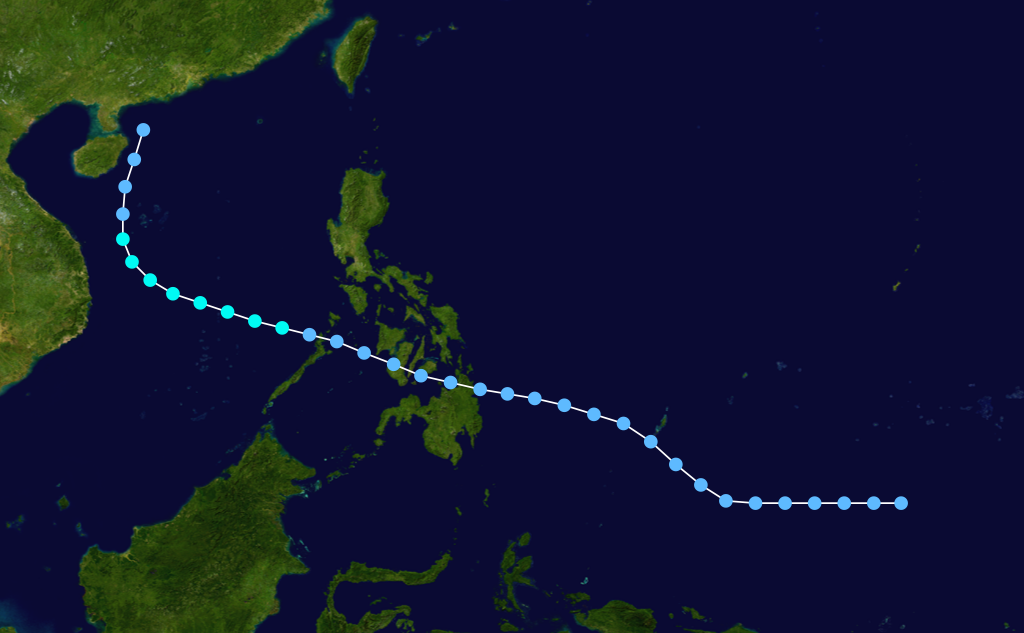
- Duration: April 23 – April 28
- Peak intensity: 85 km/h (50 mph) (10-min); 994 hPa (mbar)

Vanessa deepened over the South China Sea.

=== Typhoon Walt (Karing) ===
- Very strong typhoon (JMA)
- Category 5 super typhoon (SSHWS)
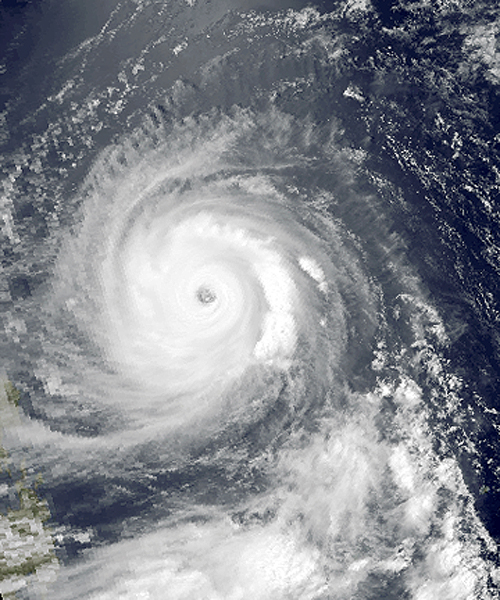
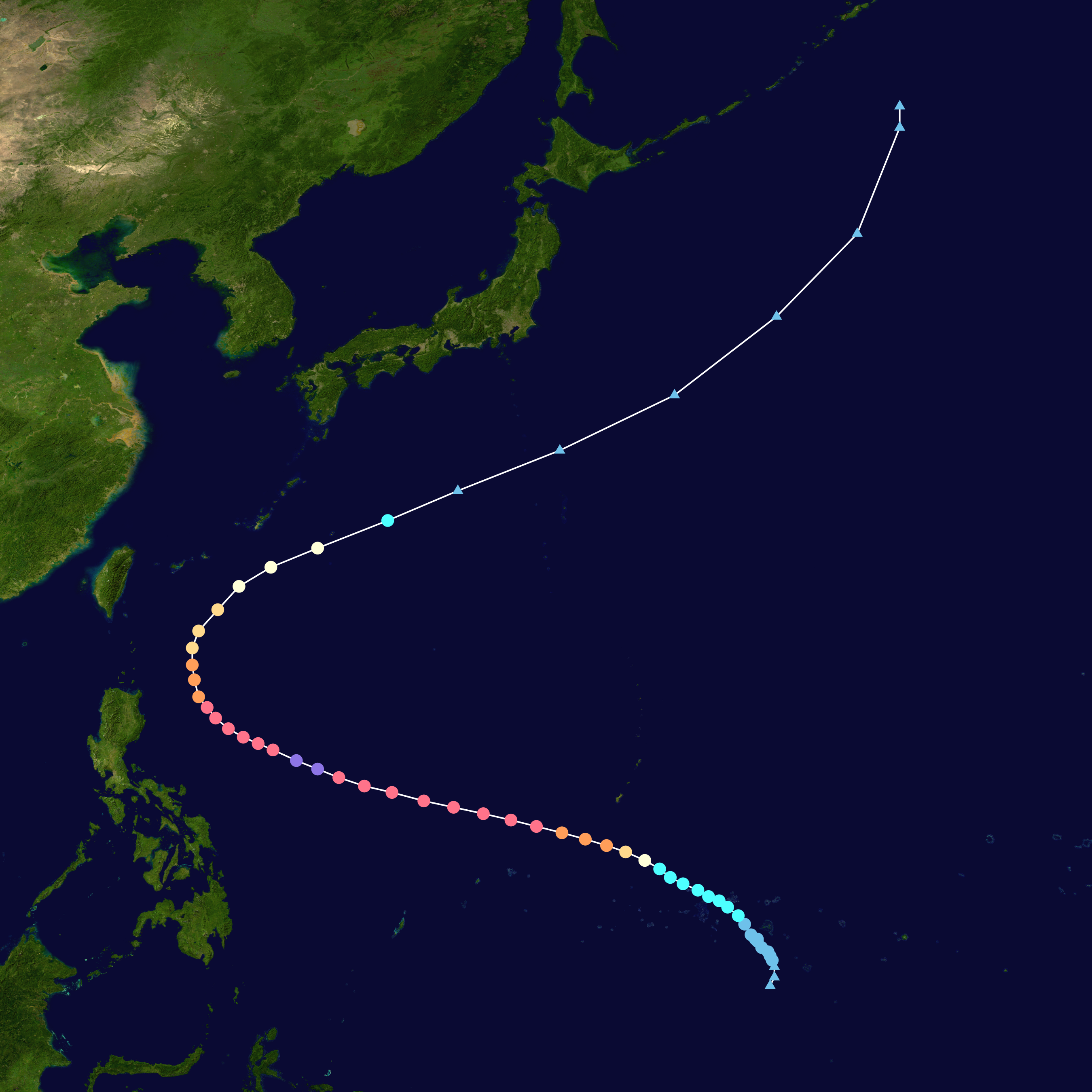
- Duration: May 5 – May 17
- Peak intensity: 185 km/h (115 mph) (10-min); 915 hPa (mbar)

On May 3 an area of disturbed area formed south east of the Mariana Islands. A day later the system strengthened into a tropical depression, and continued to intensify into typhoon status four days later. The system showed annular characteristics on May 11, showing an axisymmetric shape. Walt reached peak intensity on May 12, before showing a distinct eyewall replacement cycle lasting four hours from late May 13 to May 14. When the eyewall replacement cycle was over, a new, larger eye measuring 65 kilometers across formed. Walt soon turned north east, becoming extratropical on May 17, before merging with another extratropical cyclone north east of Japan.

=== Typhoon Yunya (Diding) ===
- Typhoon (JMA)
- Category 3 typhoon (SSHWS)
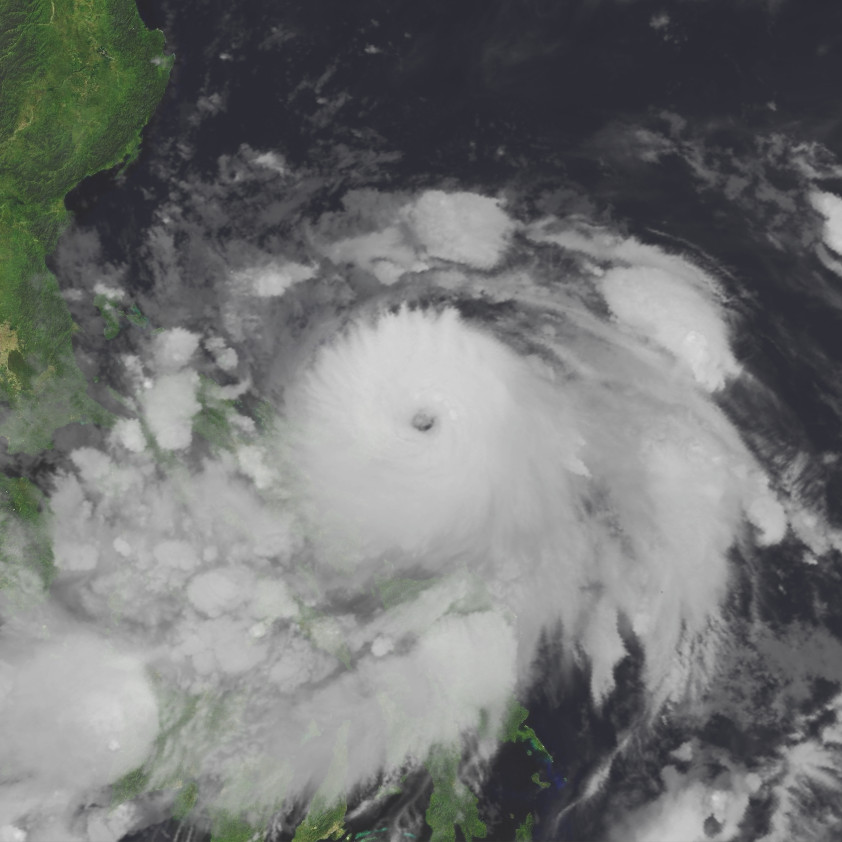
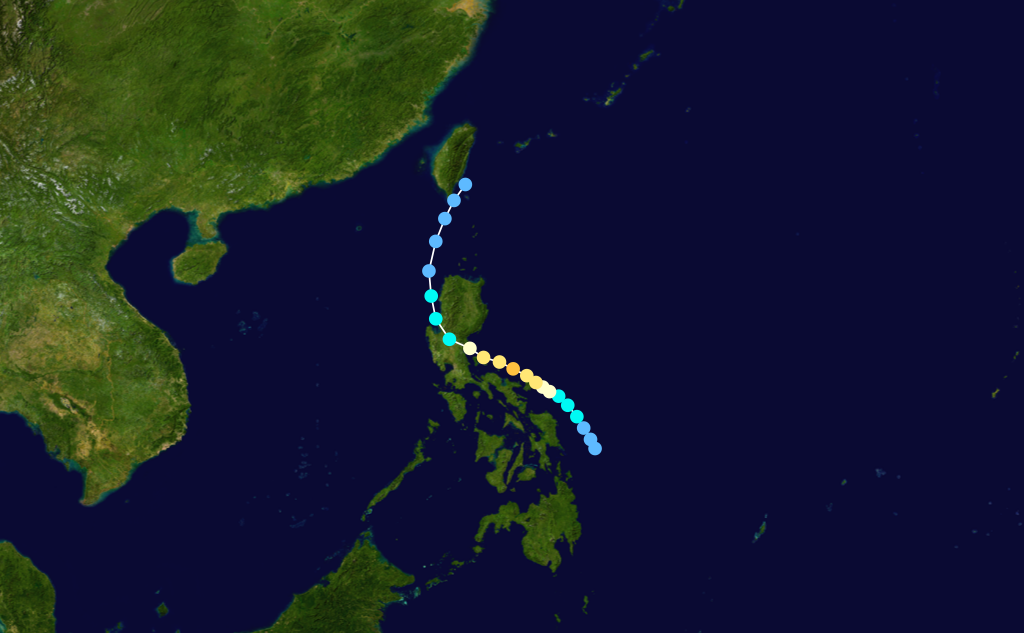
- Duration: June 12 – June 17
- Peak intensity: 150 km/h (90 mph) (10-min); 950 hPa (mbar)

After a month without any activity in the Western Pacific, a weak tropical depression (with winds of only 10 knots) developed just east of the Philippines and south of the Tropical Upper Tropospheric Trough on June 11. Located in an area of little wind shear, it headed southwestward, developing spiral-band outflow and becoming a tropical storm on the 12th. As a small central dense overcast (CDO) developed over Yunya, it rapidly developed, becoming a typhoon on the 13th as it paralleled the eastern Philippines. The mid-level ridge forced Yunya westward, where it briefly reached a peak intensity of 195 km/h (120 mph) winds on the 14th. Subsequently, the eastward building of the subtropical ridge produced unfavorable vertical wind shear that weakened Yunya to a minimal typhoon before hitting Dingalan, Luzon early on the 15th. Yunya left Luzon as a minimal tropical storm at Lingayen Gulf. It turned northward due to a break in the ridge, and dissipated on the 17th near southern Taiwan due to the vertical shear.

Yunya would likely have been an uneventful cyclone had it not struck Luzon on the same day as the climactic eruption of Mount Pinatubo. The ash cloud that normally would have been dispersed across the oceans was redistributed over Luzon by the cyclonic winds of the typhoon, greatly exacerbating the damage caused by the eruption. The water-laden ash fell over the evacuated Clark Air Base, as well as the rest of Luzon, resulting in downed power lines and the collapse of flat-roofed buildings. In some areas it was practically raining mud.

Yunya exited Luzon through Lingayen Gulf as a weak tropical storm and then turned north toward a break in the subtropical ridge. The system continued to weaken due to the strong vertical wind shear. It then brushed the southern coast of Taiwan as a tropical depression and finally dissipated before it could complete full recurvature into the mid-latitude westerlies. Yunya directly caused one death from the flooding and heavy rainfall it left.

=== Typhoon Zeke (Etang) ===
- Typhoon (JMA)
- Category 1 typhoon (SSHWS)
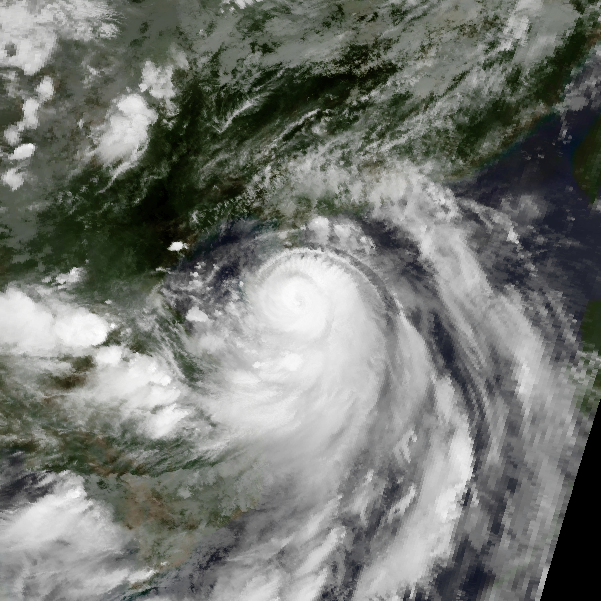
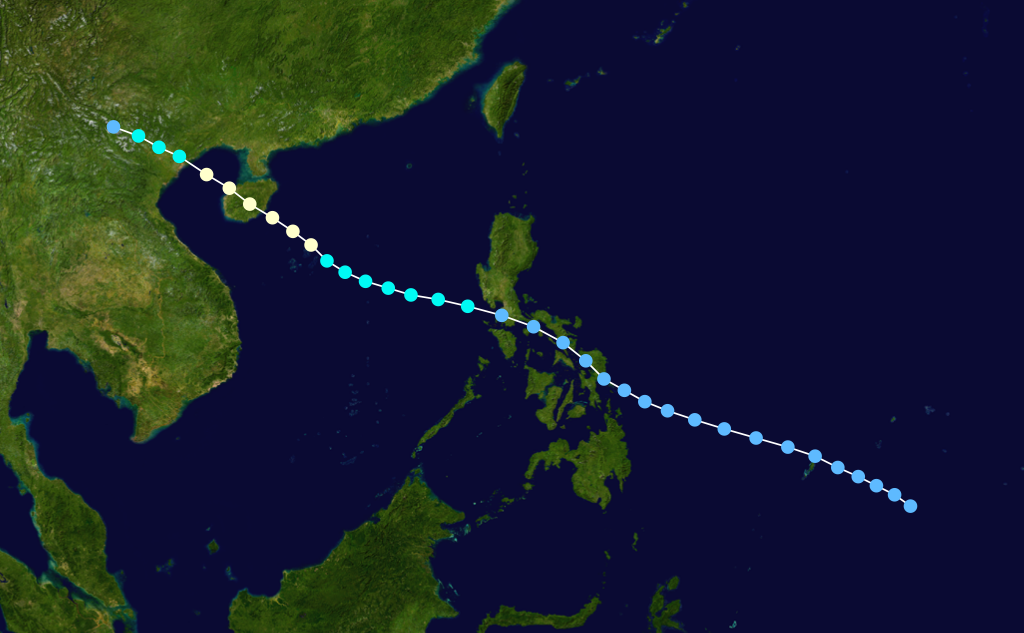
- Duration: July 9 – July 15
- Peak intensity: 120 km/h (75 mph) (10-min); 970 hPa (mbar)

At least 23 people were killed by Zeke on Hainan Island.

=== Typhoon Amy (Gening) ===
- Very strong typhoon (JMA)
- Category 4 typhoon (SSHWS)
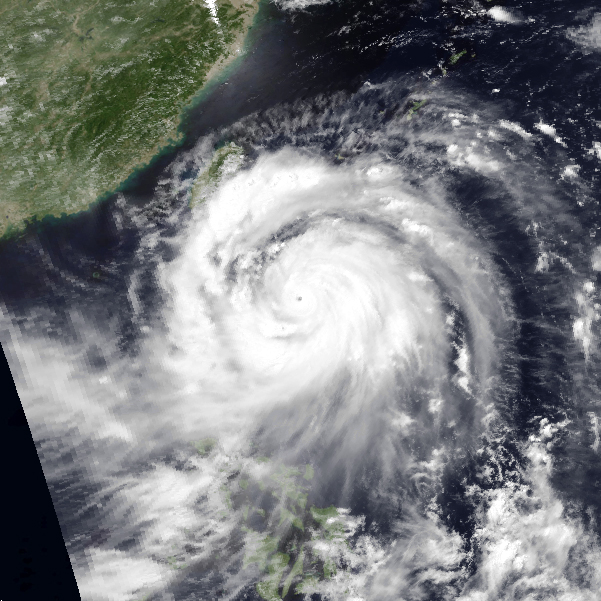
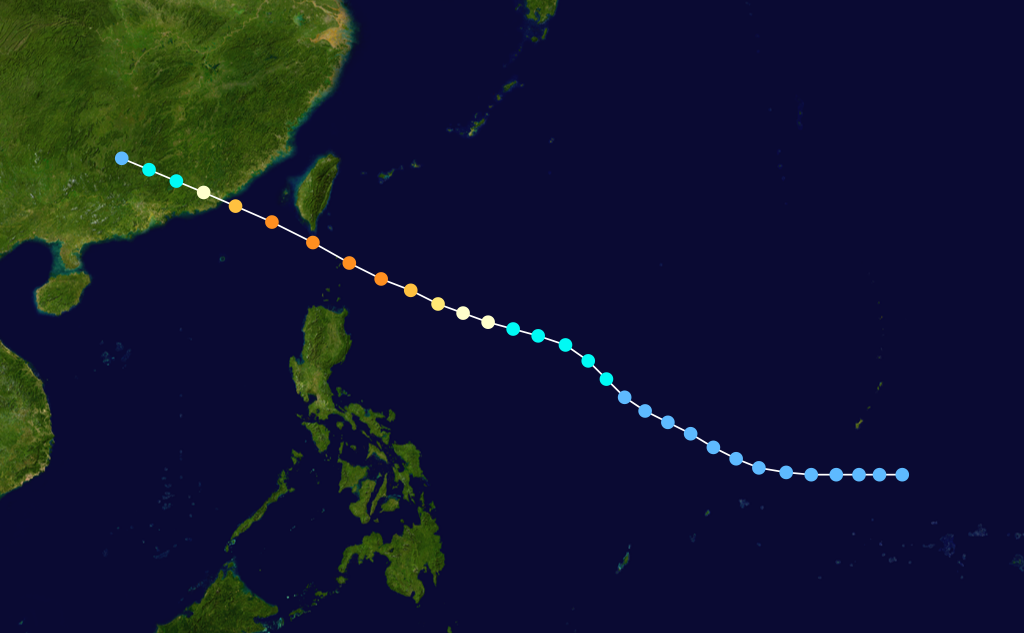
- Duration: July 14 – July 20
- Peak intensity: 175 km/h (110 mph) (10-min); 930 hPa (mbar)

145 mph Typhoon Amy, having developed on July 12 over the open Western Pacific, brushed southern Taiwan on the 18th. Its outflow became restricted, and Amy hit southern China on the 19th as a 120 mph typhoon. It caused heavy flooding, resulting in 99 casualties, 5000 people injured, and 15,000 people homeless. In addition, Amy caused the sinking of the freighter in a river, resulting in an additional 31 deaths.

=== Severe Tropical Storm Brendan (Helming) ===
- Severe tropical storm (JMA)
- Category 1 typhoon (SSHWS)
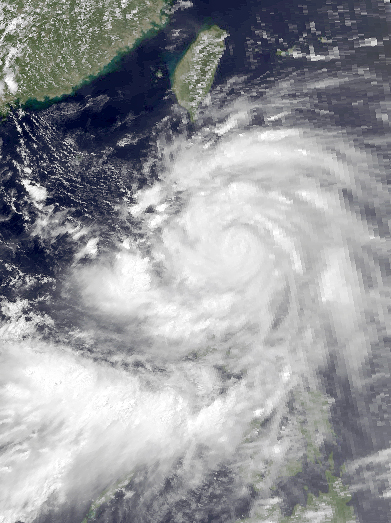
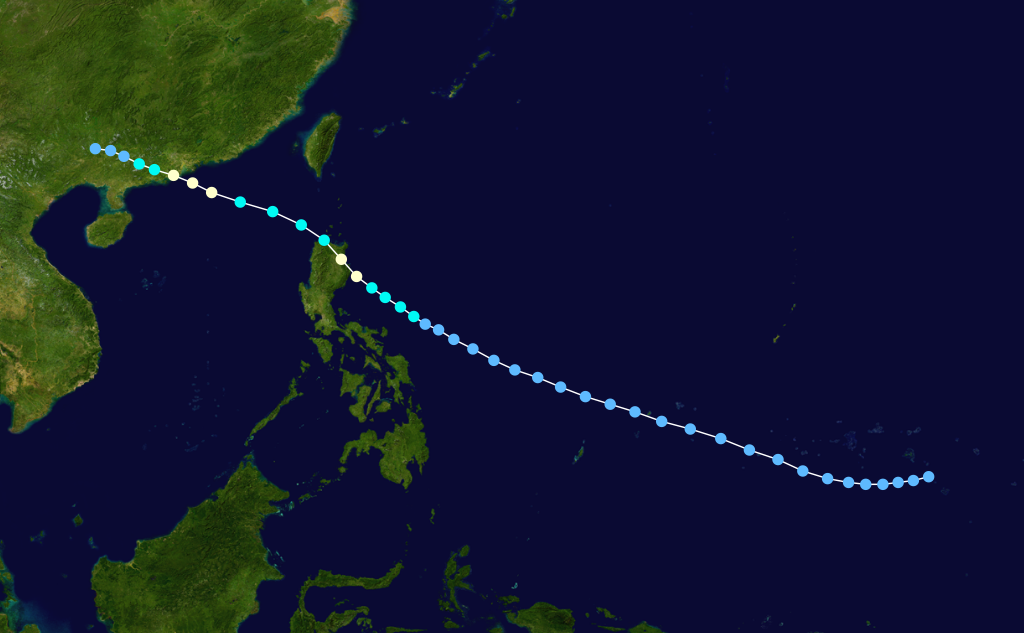
- Duration: July 19 – July 25
- Peak intensity: 110 km/h (70 mph) (10-min); 980 hPa (mbar)

Brendan was the third consecutive tropical cyclone to strike China during the month of July.

=== Typhoon Caitlin (Ising) ===
- Typhoon (JMA)
- Category 2 typhoon (SSHWS)
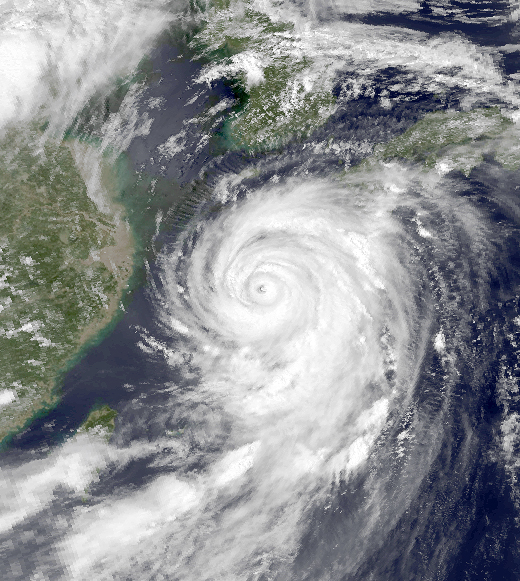
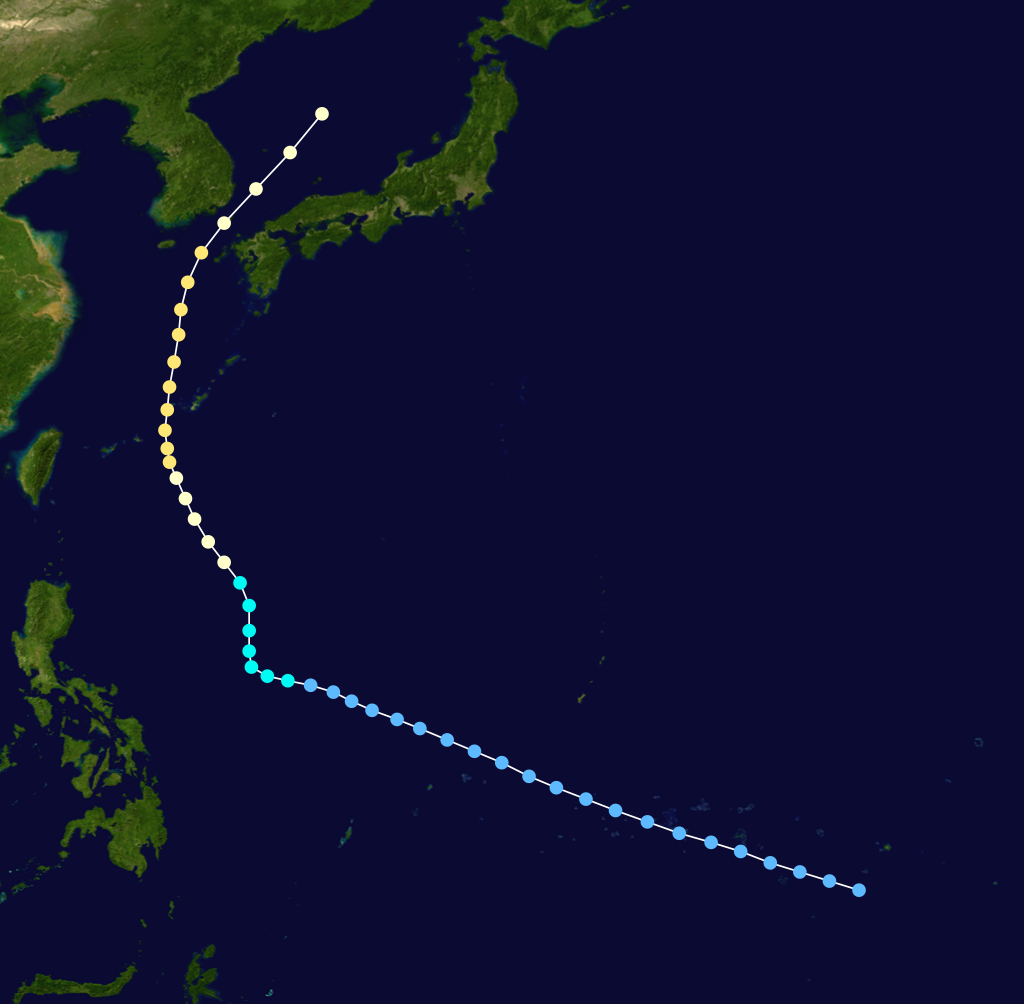
- Duration: July 21 – July 30
- Peak intensity: 150 km/h (90 mph) (10-min); 940 hPa (mbar)

Typhoon Caitlin developed from a disturbance in the eastern Caroline Islands. A tropical depression formed on July 23 as the system moved towards the northwest. Tropical Storm Caitlin was named on the 24th and was upgraded to a typhoon the next day. Typhoon Caitlin though several hundred miles away increased the monsoonal flow over the Philippines. Heavy rains caused landslides in the Mt. Pinatubo region killing 16 people. As Caitlin turned to the north the storm passed 60 miles (97 km) to the west of Kadena AB, Okinawa at peak intensity of 110 mph. The heavy rains from Caitlin helped to relieve the ongoing drought on the island, one death was reported. Typhoon Caitlin then began to accelerate northwards and passed through the Korea Strait before turning extratropical in the Sea of Japan. Heavy flooding in South Korea killed 2 people and caused $4 million in damage.

=== Tropical Depression Enrique ===
- Tropical depression (JMA)
- Tropical storm (SSHWS)
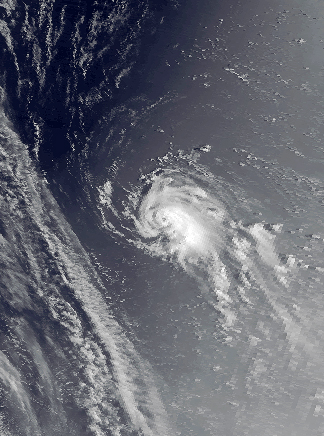
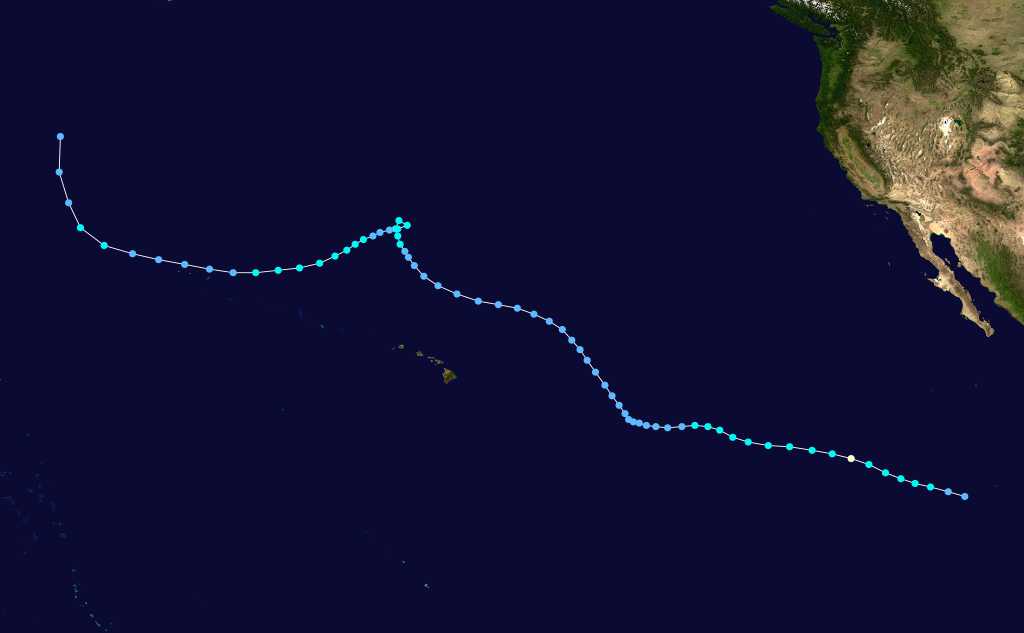
- Duration: July 31 (Entered basin) – August 1
- Peak intensity: 65 km/h (40 mph) (1-min); 1016 hPa (mbar)

Tropical Storm Enrique formed in the eastern Pacific basin, where it reached its peak intensity as a category 1 Hurricane, becoming Hurricane Enrique. Enrique lasted for several days drifting north of the Hawaiian Islands as a weak system. As Enrique approached the International Dateline, the system started to redevelop. Shortly after crossing the dateline, Enrique became a tropical storm again on August 1. It lasted for less than 24 hours before strong upper-level wind shear dissipated its convection, exposing the cyclone's circulation. No damages or casualties were caused by Enrique. It is one of only eight tropical cyclones to exist in all three tropical cyclone basins in the Pacific Ocean. The others are 1986's Georgette, 1994's Li and John, 1999's Dora, 2014's Genevieve, 2018's Hector and 2023's Dora.

=== Tropical Depression Doug ===
- Tropical depression (JMA)
- Tropical storm (SSHWS)
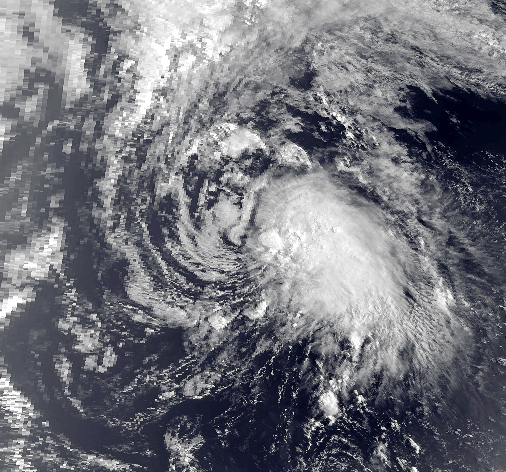
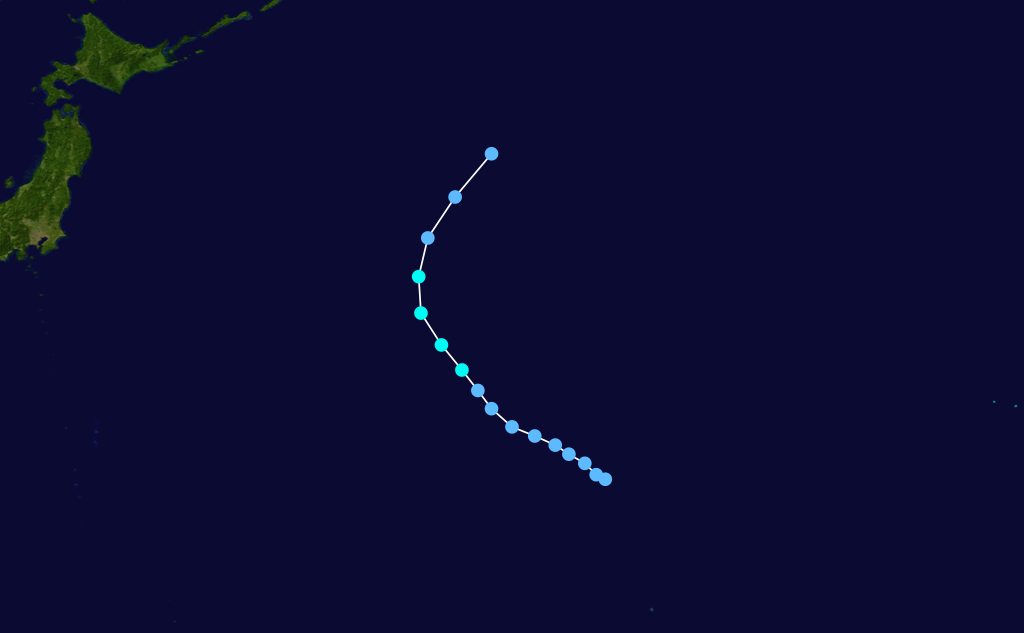
- Duration: August 7 – August 10
- Peak intensity: 65 km/h (40 mph) (1-min); 1000 hPa (mbar)

Doug was a tropical storm according to the JTWC.

=== Typhoon Ellie (Mameng) ===
- Typhoon (JMA)
- Category 2 typhoon (SSHWS)
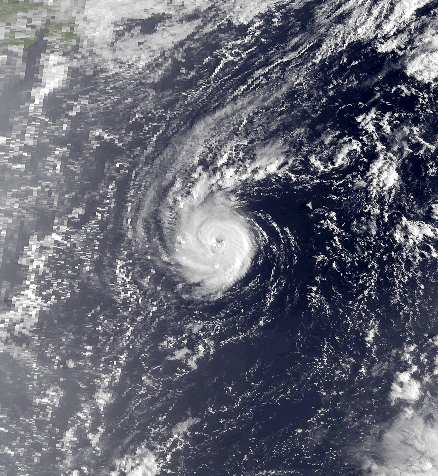
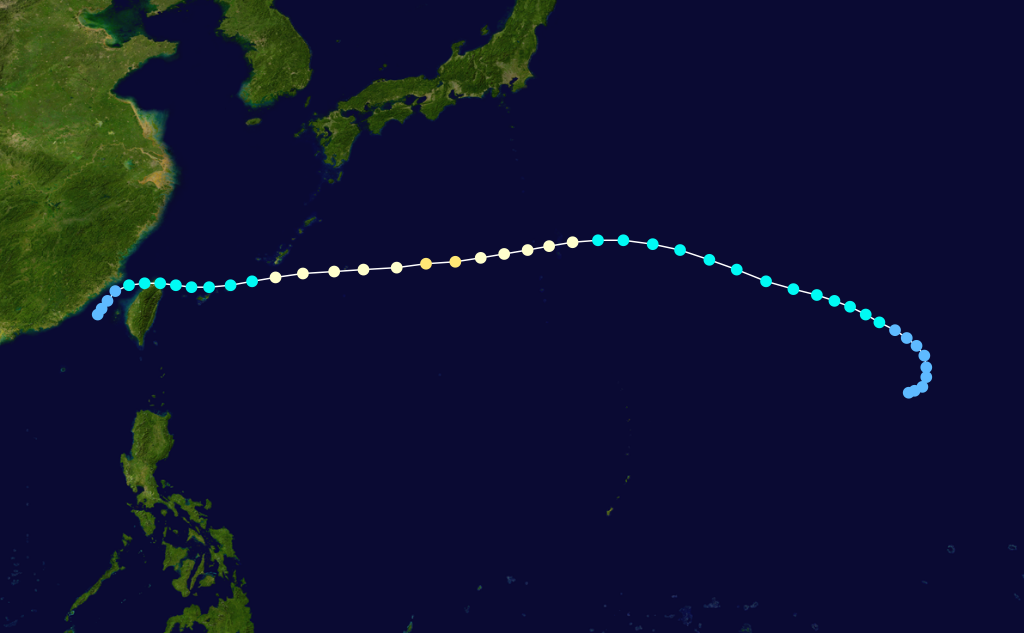
- Duration: August 10 – August 19
- Peak intensity: 130 km/h (80 mph) (10-min); 960 hPa (mbar)

Ellie was an unusually small typhoon which hit Taiwan as a tropical storm.

=== Typhoon Fred (Luding) ===
- Typhoon (JMA)
- Category 2 typhoon (SSHWS)
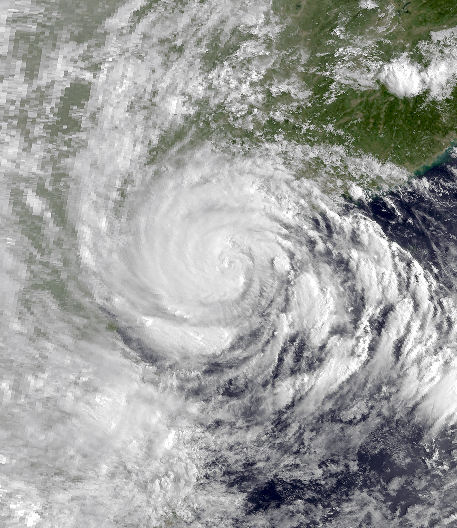
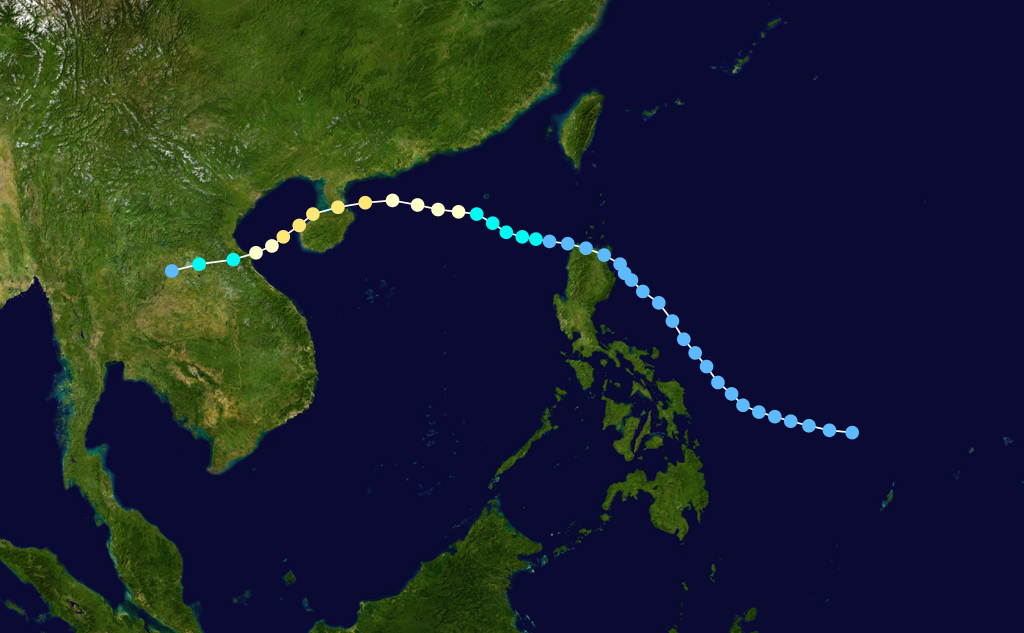
- Duration: August 11 – August 18
- Peak intensity: 140 km/h (85 mph) (10-min); 960 hPa (mbar)

Typhoon Fred organized from a monsoon trough situated to the east of the Central Philippines, a depression formed on August 11. The depression moved across northern Luzon Island, upon entering the South China Sea the depression was upgraded to Tropical Storm Fred. Fred reached typhoon intensity on August 14 as the storm moved south of Hong Kong. Fred reached peak intensity of 110 mph (180 km/h) shortly before moving across Hainan Island. Fred then turned to the southwest across the Gulf of Tonkin and made a final landfall in northern Vietnam before dissipating. The observed minimum atmospheric pressure value in Kỳ Anh (Hà Tĩnh) during the storm reached 976.9 hPa. As Fred moved south of Hong Kong the oil rig support barge DB29 sank with 195 people on board; 22 people on board the ship were killed. In Guangdong, 90,000 homes were damaged and 9,400 homes were destroyed. Losses in Hong Kong reached 350 million RMB (US$64.8 million). On Hainan Island heavy flooding and landslides from Fred's rains killed 16 people. Losses on Hainan Island reached 304 million RMB (US$56.3 million). Tropical storm Fred left 5 people dead and 16 injured in Vietnam.

=== Tropical Depression 13W ===
- Tropical depression (JMA)
- Tropical depression (SSHWS)
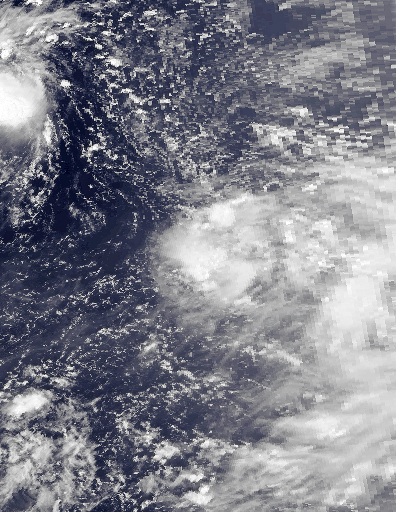
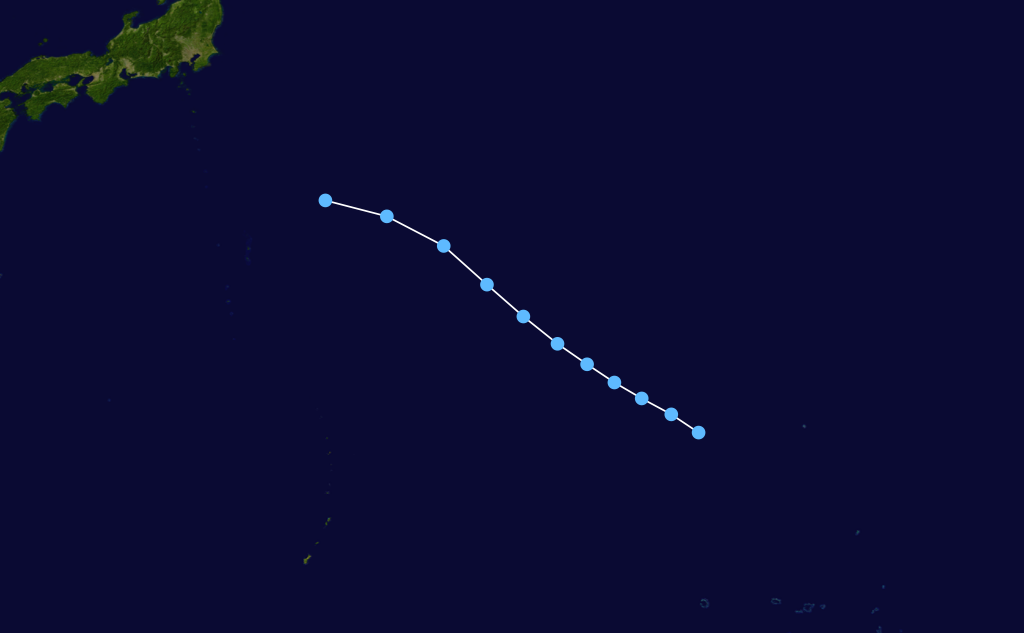
- Duration: August 11 – August 13
- Peak intensity: 45 km/h (30 mph) (1-min); 1002 hPa (mbar)

13W lasted two days.

=== Severe Tropical Storm Gladys ===
- Severe tropical storm (JMA)
- Category 1 typhoon (SSHWS)
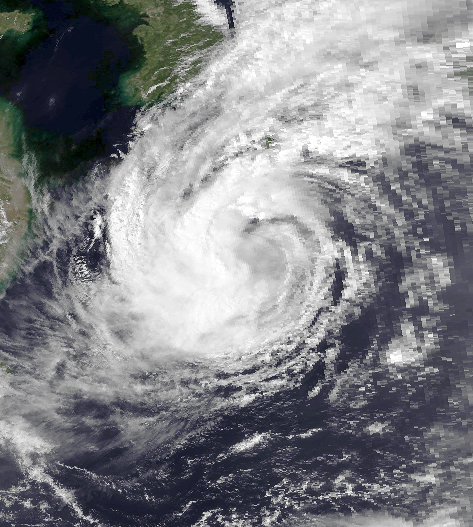
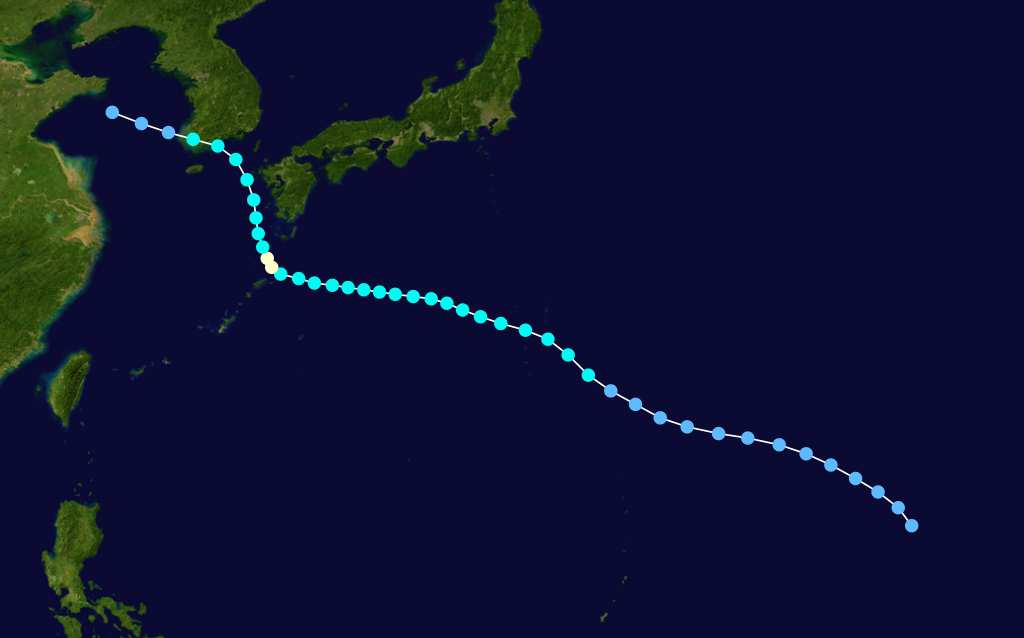
- Duration: August 15 – August 24
- Peak intensity: 110 km/h (70 mph) (10-min); 965 hPa (mbar)

Minimal typhoon Gladys brushed by southern Japan on August 22. It moved to the northwest, and hit the Korean Peninsula on the 23rd. It caused more than 20 million yen of damage in Japan, more than 270 million won of damage in South Korea, and in South Korea, it left 103 dead or missing and more than 20,000 homeless.

=== Tropical Storm 15W ===
- Tropical storm (JMA)
- Tropical depression (SSHWS)
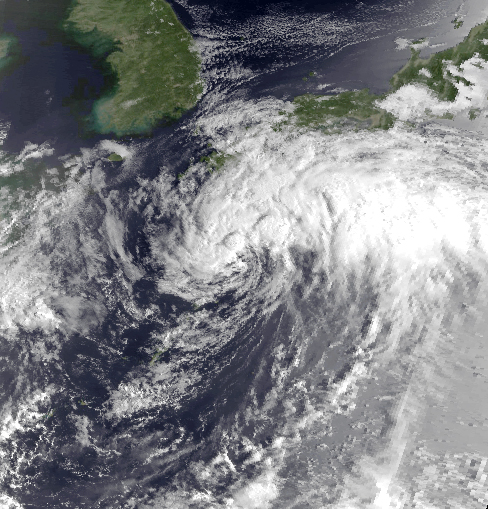
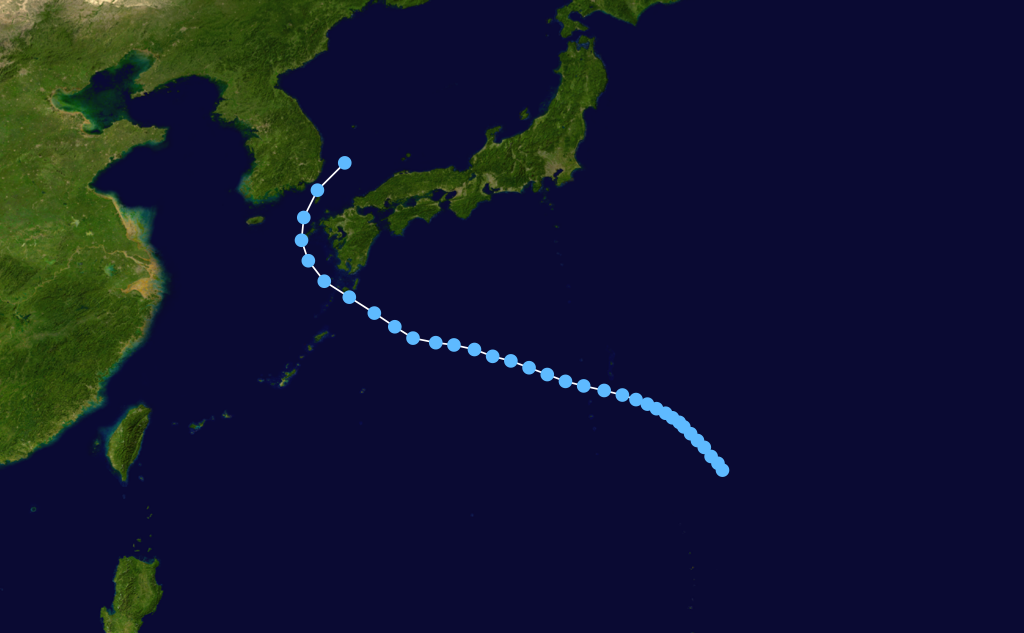
- Duration: August 26 – August 30
- Peak intensity: 65 km/h (40 mph) (10-min); 992 hPa (mbar)

15W was a long-lived depression that moved northwest.

=== Tropical Storm Harry ===
- Tropical storm (JMA)
- Tropical storm (SSHWS)
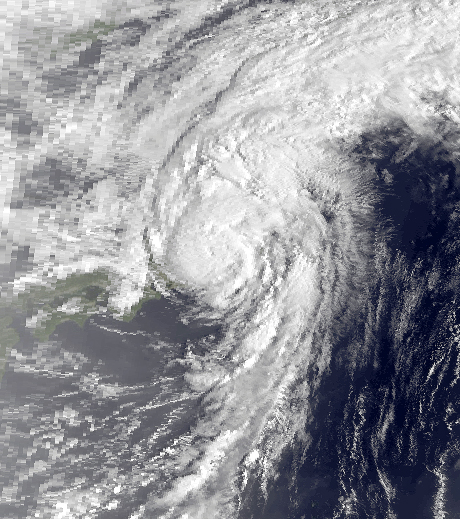
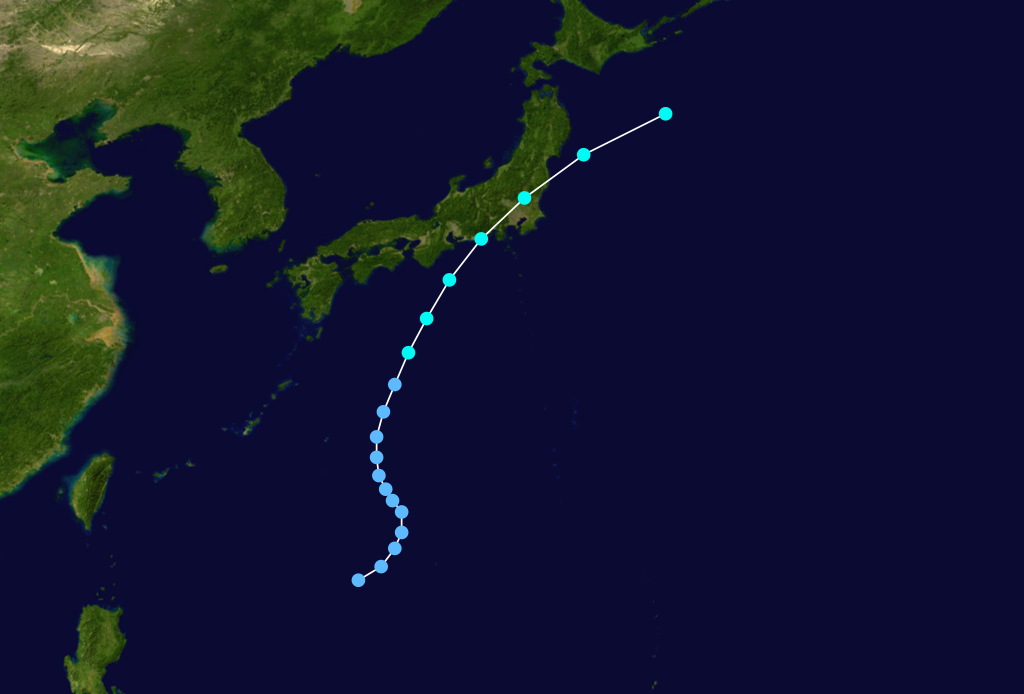
- Duration: August 28 – August 31
- Peak intensity: 75 km/h (45 mph) (10-min); 992 hPa (mbar)

Harry originally formed from a small cluster of thunderstorms in mid August.it moved over the Pacific Ocean and became better organized. On August 29, it was given the name “Harry”. It then moved north and made landfall on Japan a few days later. Harry then weakened because of the land and also because when it moved out to sea again, it moved over colder waters and dissipated on August 31.

=== Typhoon Ivy ===
- Very strong typhoon (JMA)
- Category 4 typhoon (SSHWS)
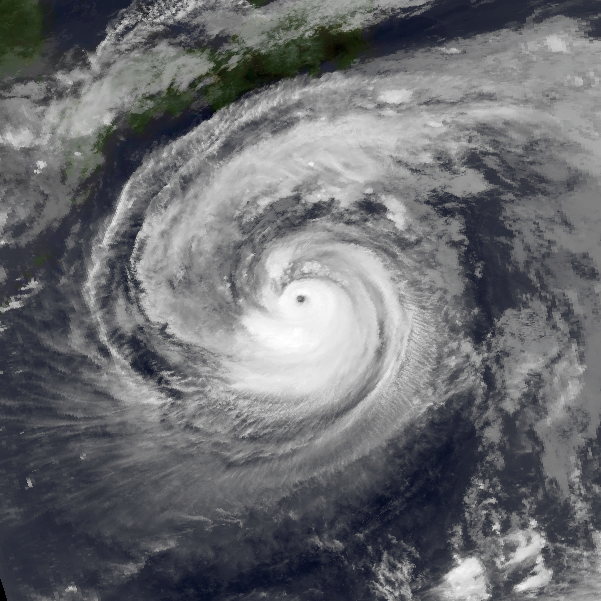
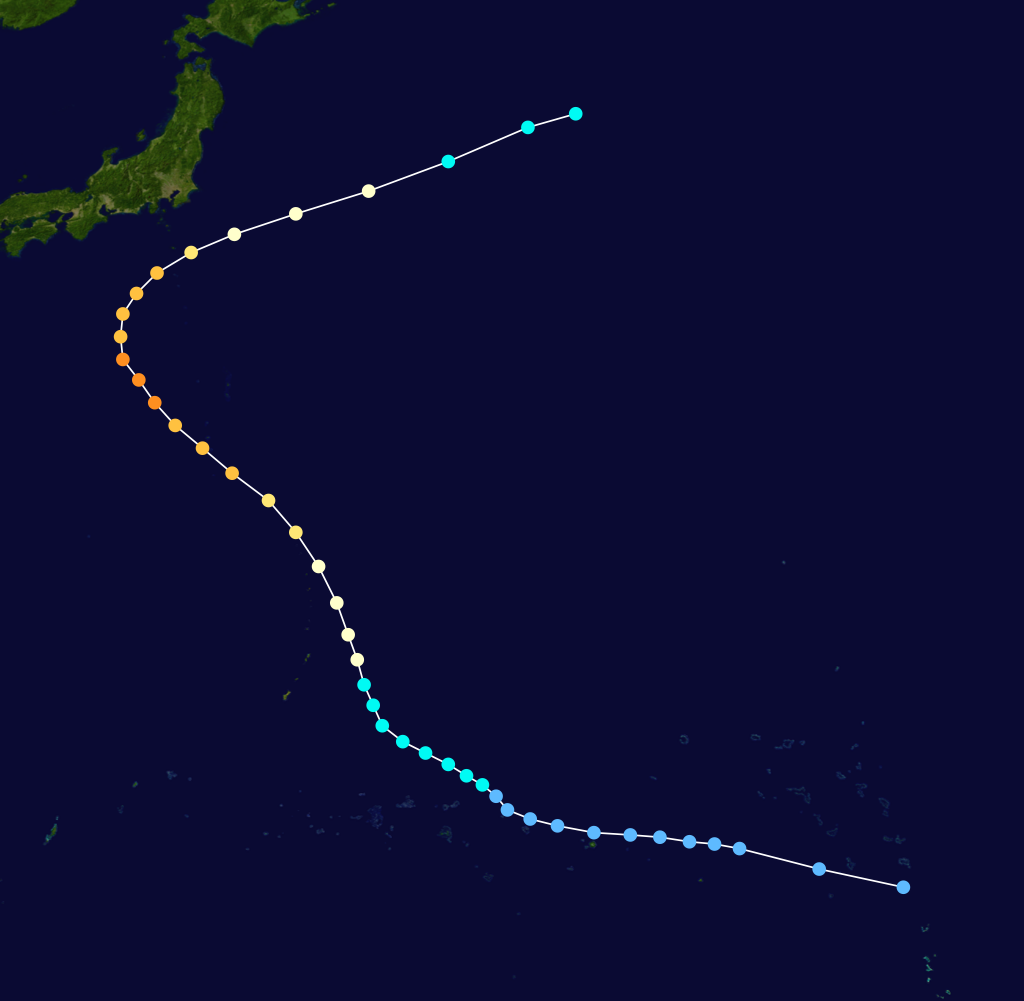
- Duration: September 2 – September 10
- Peak intensity: 175 km/h (110 mph) (10-min); 935 hPa (mbar)

Typhoon Ivy formed from a broad monsoon trough situated near Kosrae in the eastern Caroline Islands. A tropical depression formed on September 2 as the system moved towards the northwest, the next day the depression strengthened into Tropical Storm Ivy. Ivy began to rapidly intensify and reached typhoon strength as the storm passed 130 miles (210 km) east of Tinian and Saipan in the Northern Mariana Islands. On Saipan one drowning death was reported, but only minor damage was reported in the Northern Marianas. Typhoon Ivy continued on a northwesterly path and reached peak strength of 130 mph (210 km/h) on September 7 prior to recurving to the northeast. Ivy paralleled the southeastern Japan coastline and turned extratropical 600 miles (970 km) to the east of Tokyo. As Typhoon Ivy made its closest approach to Honshū, Tokyo and surrounding areas were buffeted by high winds and heavy rains. Over 200 landslides were reported and one person was killed with 4 others missing. Losses totaled to ¥1.6 billion (US$12 million).

=== Tropical Storm Joel ===
- Tropical storm (JMA)
- Tropical storm (SSHWS)
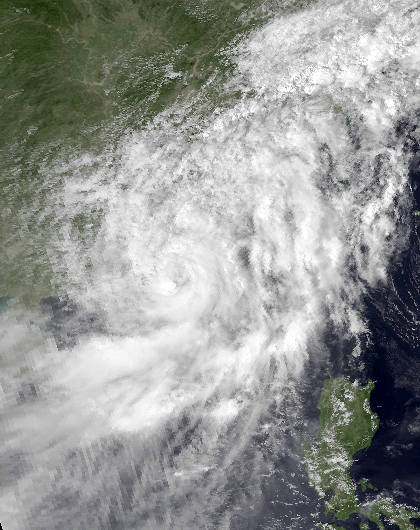
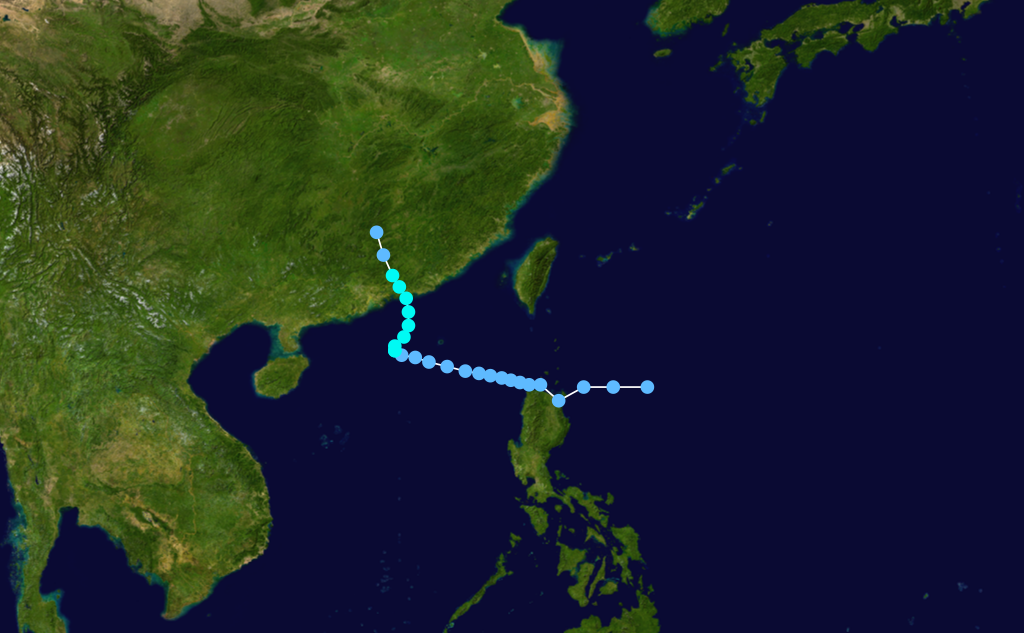
- Duration: September 3 – September 8
- Peak intensity: 85 km/h (50 mph) (10-min); 985 hPa (mbar)

Joel hit southern China. Joel killed five people and injured 75 people. 8,680 homes were flooded and 4,000 homes were destroyed. 78,000 hectares of farmland were affected. 130 bridges, 257 irrigation facilities and 70 hectares of fish ponds were damaged. Economic losses reached 400 million RMB (US$74.1 million).

=== Typhoon Kinna (Neneng) ===
- Typhoon (JMA)
- Category 2 typhoon (SSHWS)
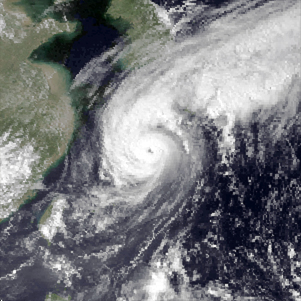
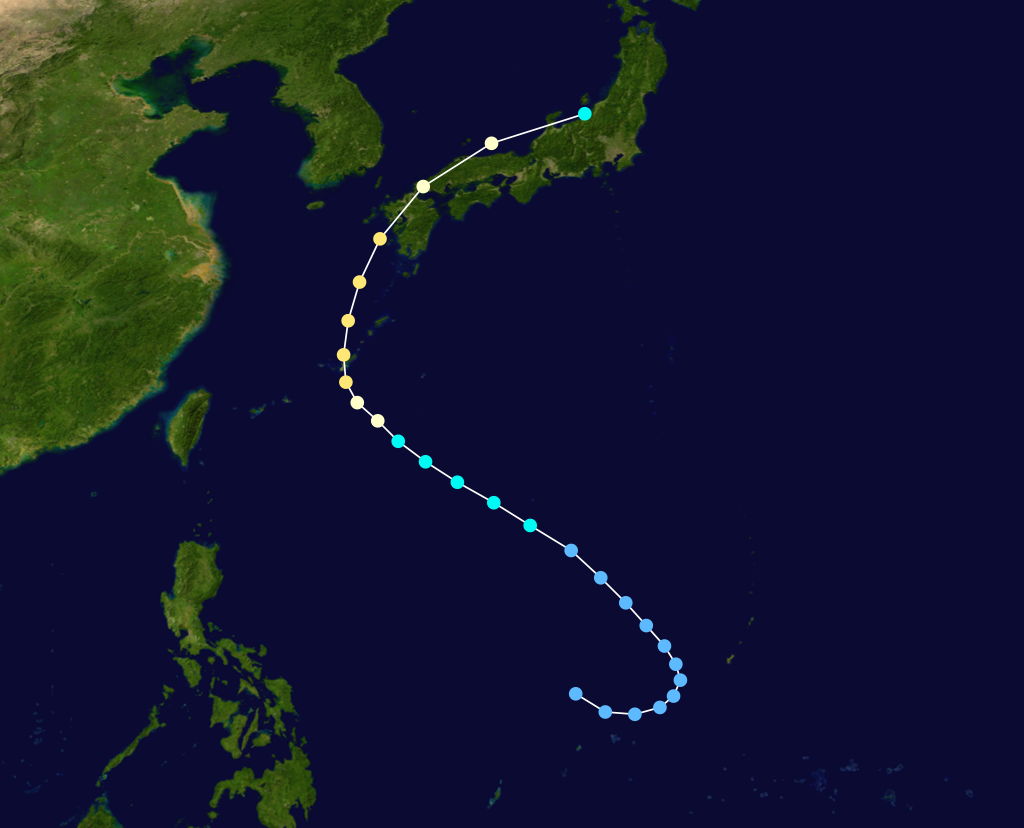
- Duration: September 10 – September 14
- Peak intensity: 150 km/h (90 mph) (10-min); 955 hPa (mbar)

Typhoon Kinna formed in a monsoon trough in the western Caroline Islands. A tropical depression began to organize on September 10 to the west of Guam, Tropical Storm Kinna was named later the same day. As Kinna moved towards the northwest the storm began to gather strength and reached typhoon intensity on September 12 just prior to turning north threatening Japan. On the 12th Typhoon Kinna made a direct landfall on southern Okinawa Island at peak strength of 105 mph (169 km/h). Kinna maintained peak intensity after recurving to the north-northeast and making landfall on Kyūshū Island. Typhoon Kinna's eyewall passed directly over Nagasaki and Sasebo cities on September 13, both cities reported wind gusts of 115 mph (185 km/h). Kinna continued moving across Japan and became extratropical near the northern coast of Honshū Island. On Okinawa Kinna dropped more than 8 inches (200 mm) of rain, in Japan most of the damage occurred near Nagasaki. Throughout Japan and Okinawa 9 deaths were attributable to Typhoon Kinna's passage.

=== Typhoon Mireille (Rosing) ===
- Very strong typhoon (JMA)
- Category 4 super typhoon (SSHWS)
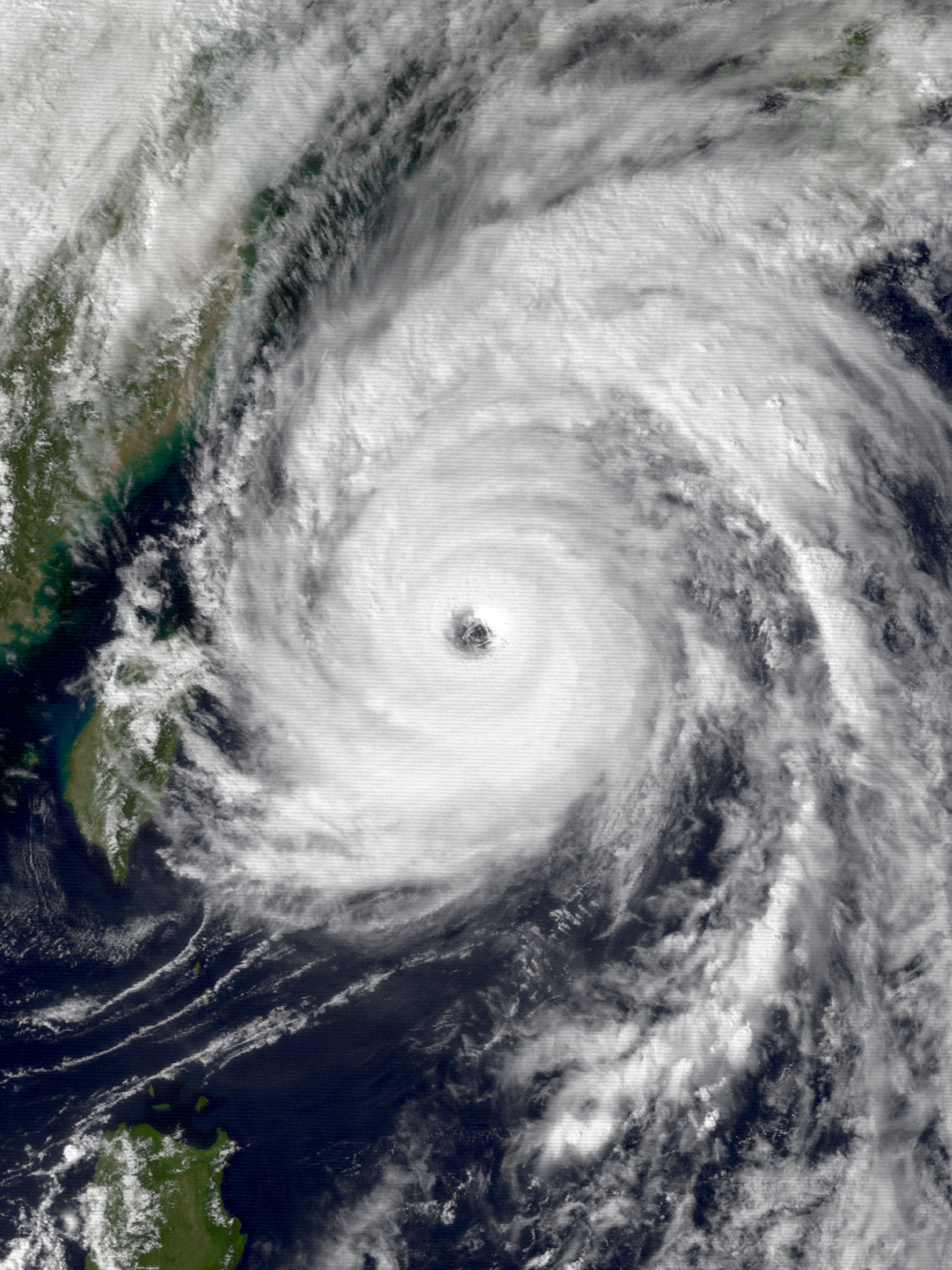
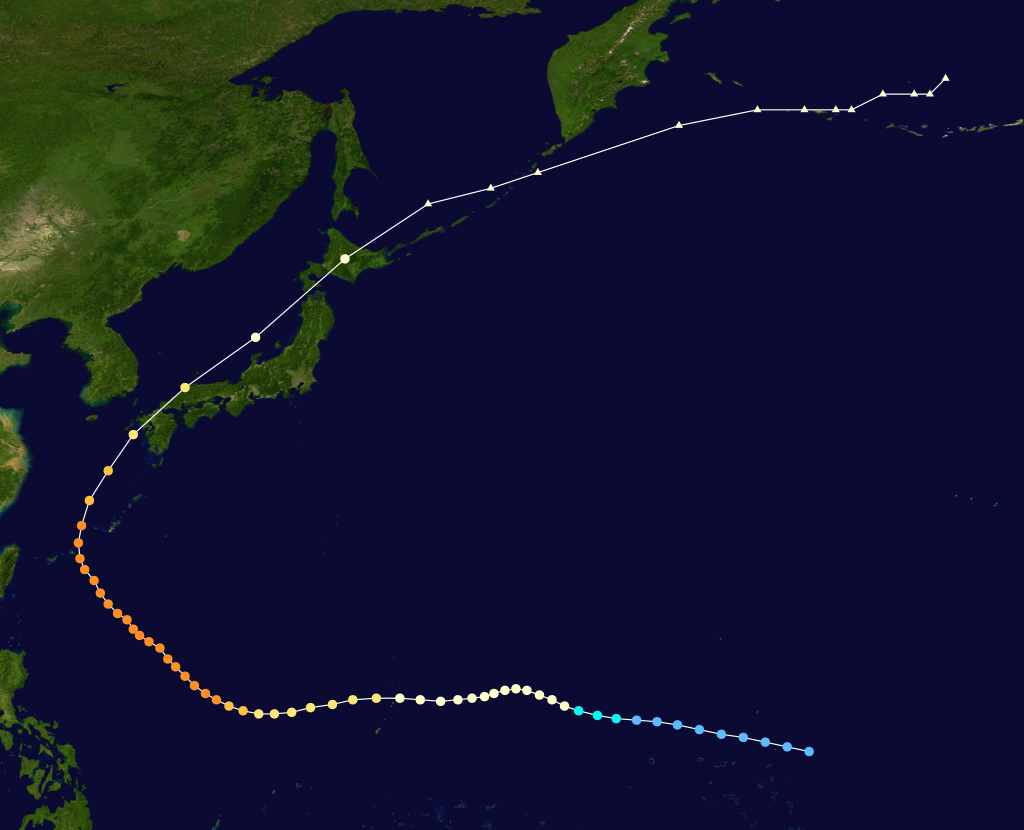
- Duration: September 13 – September 28
- Peak intensity: 185 km/h (115 mph) (10-min); 925 hPa (mbar)

On September 13, Tropical Depression 21W developed over the open Western Pacific. It tracked westward under the influence of the Subtropical Ridge, slowly organizing until becoming a tropical storm on the 15th. A small storm, Mireille rapidly became a typhoon on the 16th, but larger Tropical Storm Luke to its north and Typhoon Nat to its west kept Mireille a minimal typhoon. When the other two storms were far enough away, Mireille rapidly intensified, reaching super typhoon strength on the 22nd with a peak of 150 mph (240 km/h) winds. The storm recurved to the northeast, where it slowly weakened until hitting southwestern Japan on the 27th as a 105 mph (169 km/h) typhoon. Mireille continued to the northeast, and became extratropical later that day, after causing 52 casualties and heavy crop damage amounting to $3 billion (1991 USD). The name Mireille was retired after this season and was replaced by Melissa. The Panama flagged vessel MV "Darshan" loaded with cement clinker from Ube, Japan and intended to bound for Kuching, East Malaysia has grounded in the Eastern part of Hime-shima island "Princess Island".

=== Severe Tropical Storm Luke (Pepang) ===
- Severe tropical storm (JMA)
- Tropical storm (SSHWS)
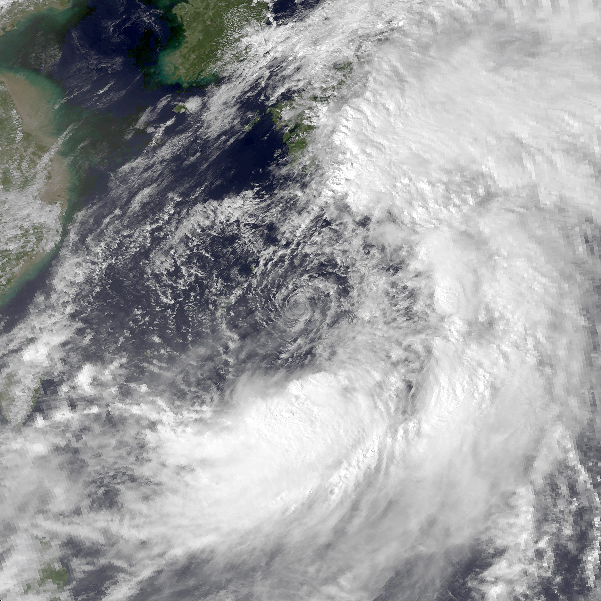
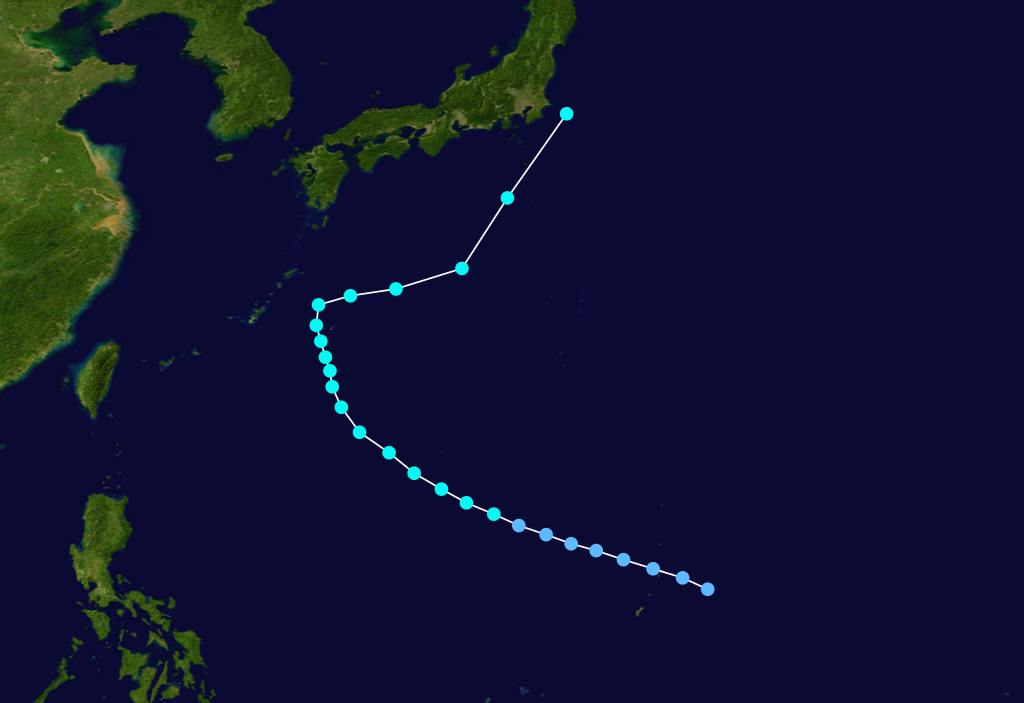
- Duration: September 14 – September 19
- Peak intensity: 100 km/h (65 mph) (10-min); 980 hPa (mbar)

Tropical Storm Luke formed from a disturbance that moved through the Northern Marianas and became a tropical depression on September 14 just to the west of the islands. The depression began to slowly intensify as it moved towards the west-northwest and Tropical Storm Luke was named on September 15. Luke reached peak intensity of 60 mph (97 km/h) prior to recurving to the northeast and weakening due to increased shear. Tropical Storm Luke then paralleled the southeastern Japan coastline, dropping heavy rains. The resulting flooding and landslides killed 8 people and left 10 others missing prior to Luke turning extratropical east of central Honshū Island.

=== Typhoon Nat (Oniang) ===
- Typhoon (JMA)
- Category 3 typhoon (SSHWS)
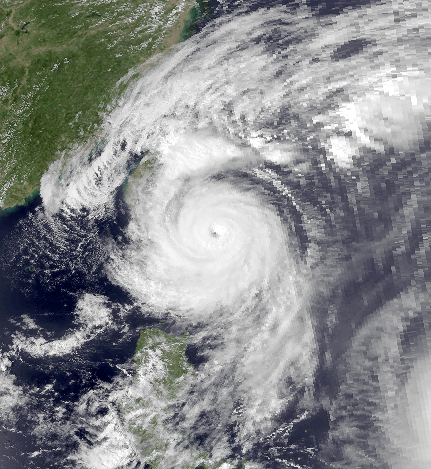
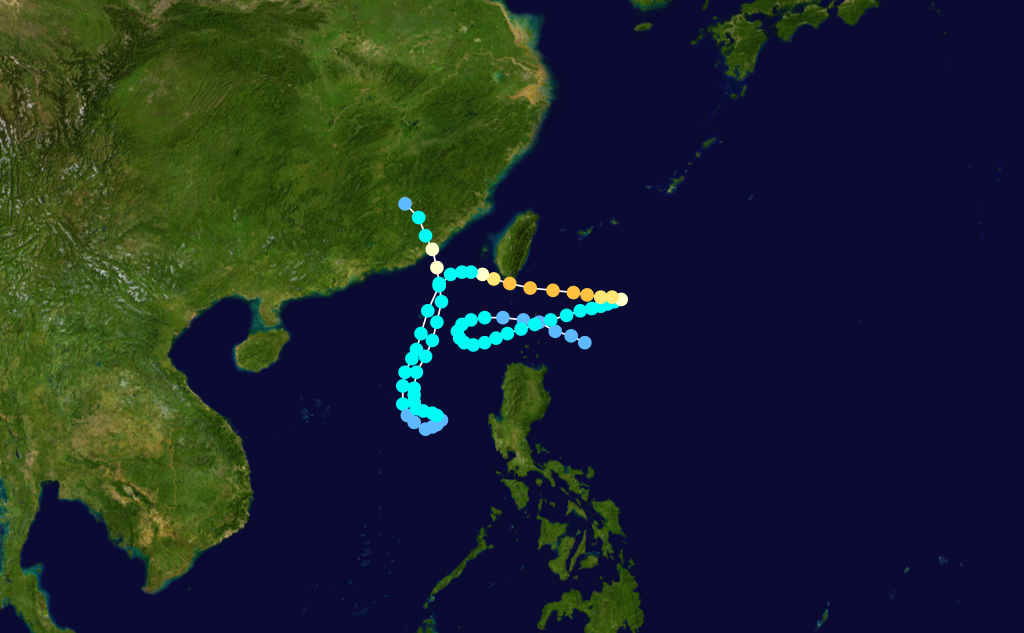
- Duration: September 14 – October 3
- Peak intensity: 150 km/h (90 mph) (10-min); 950 hPa (mbar)

Forming on September 14, Nat took an erratic track for over two weeks, making a Category 3 landfall in extreme southern Taiwan and a Category 1 landfall in southeastern China after interacting with Super Typhoon Mireille. Nat eventually dissipated over China on October 3. In Shantou, two people were killed, seven were reported missing, and 22 were injured. 500 homes were destroyed and 21,500 hectares of farmland were affected. Losses were at 90 million RMB (US$16.7 million).

=== Typhoon Orchid (Sendang) ===
- Very strong typhoon (JMA)
- Category 4 typhoon (SSHWS)
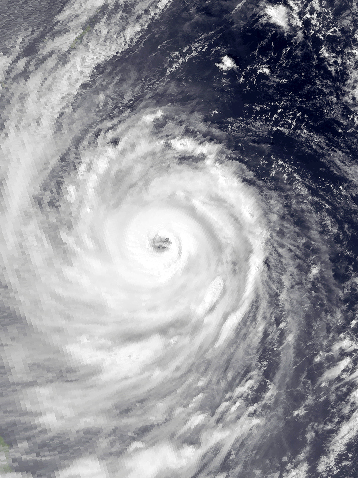
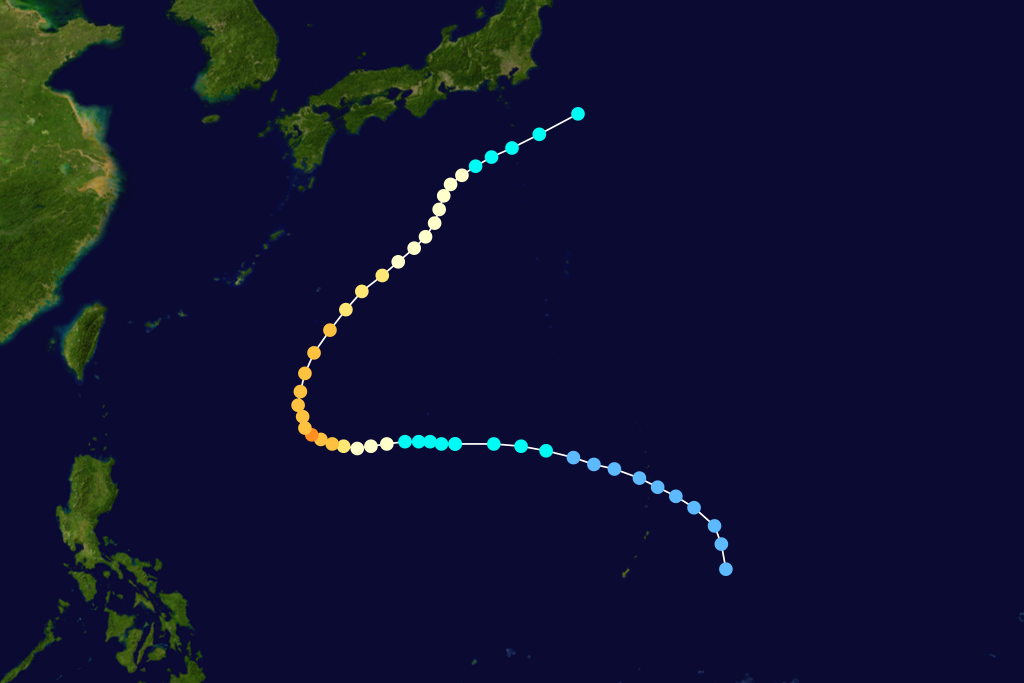
- Duration: October 3 – October 14
- Peak intensity: 175 km/h (110 mph) (10-min); 930 hPa (mbar)

Typhoon Orchid formed from a broad monsoon trough that moved through the Northern Marianas and became a tropical depression on October 4 to the west of the islands. The depression moved on a westerly path and strengthened into Tropical Storm Orchid later the same day. Orchid then began to rapidly intensify and reach peak strength on 130 mph (210 km/h) on October 7 prior to turning to the northeast and accelerating. Typhoon Orchid paralleled the southeast coast of Shikoku and Honshū Islands. As Orchid brushed the islands 96 landslides and heavy flooding were reported in and around the Tokyo region, one person was reported killed due to flooding. Though a great distance away the waves from Orchid and Typhoon Pat combined to produce tremendous waves resulting in the deaths of 2 people on Guam.

=== Typhoon Pat ===
- Very strong typhoon (JMA)
- Category 4 typhoon (SSHWS)
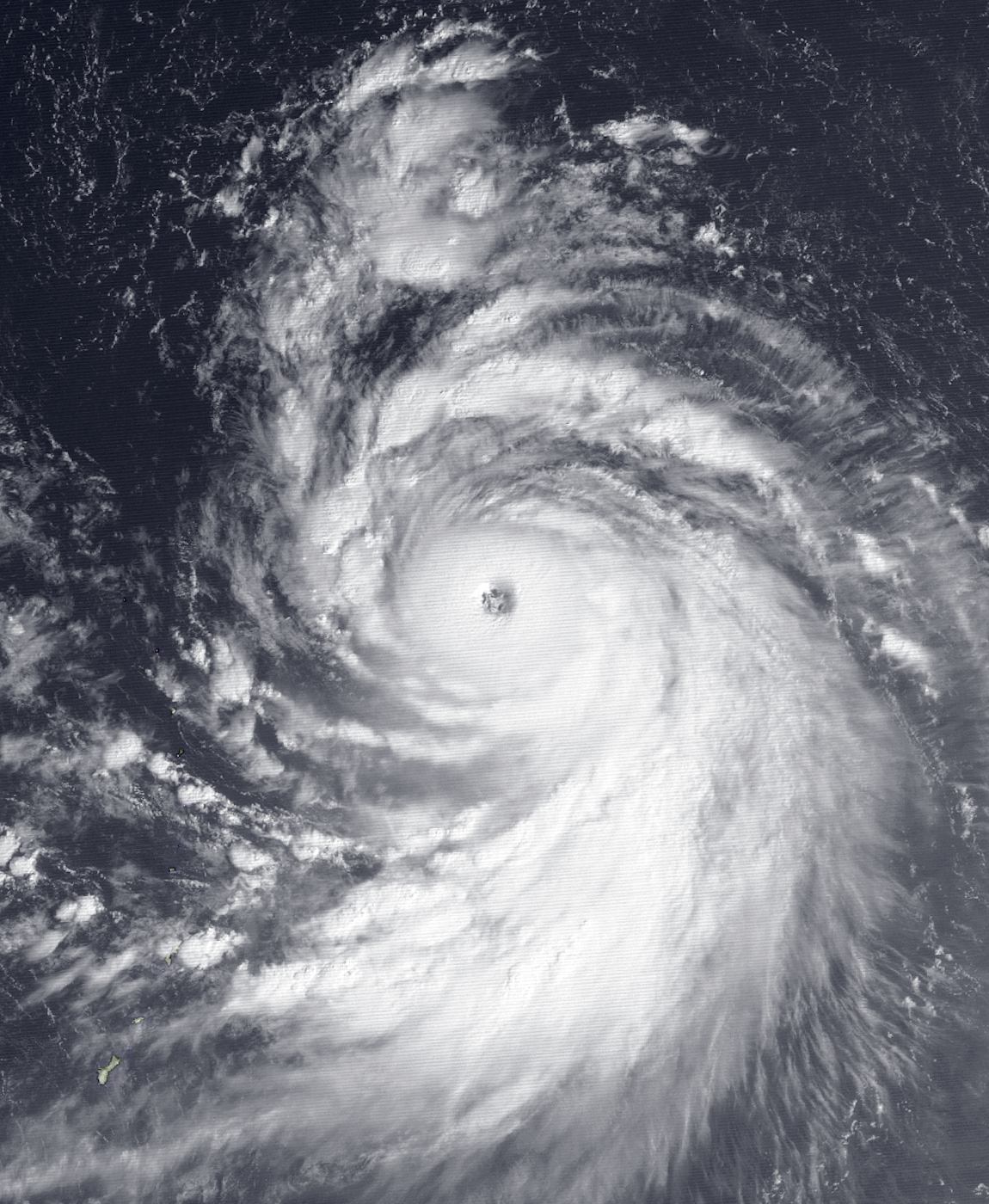
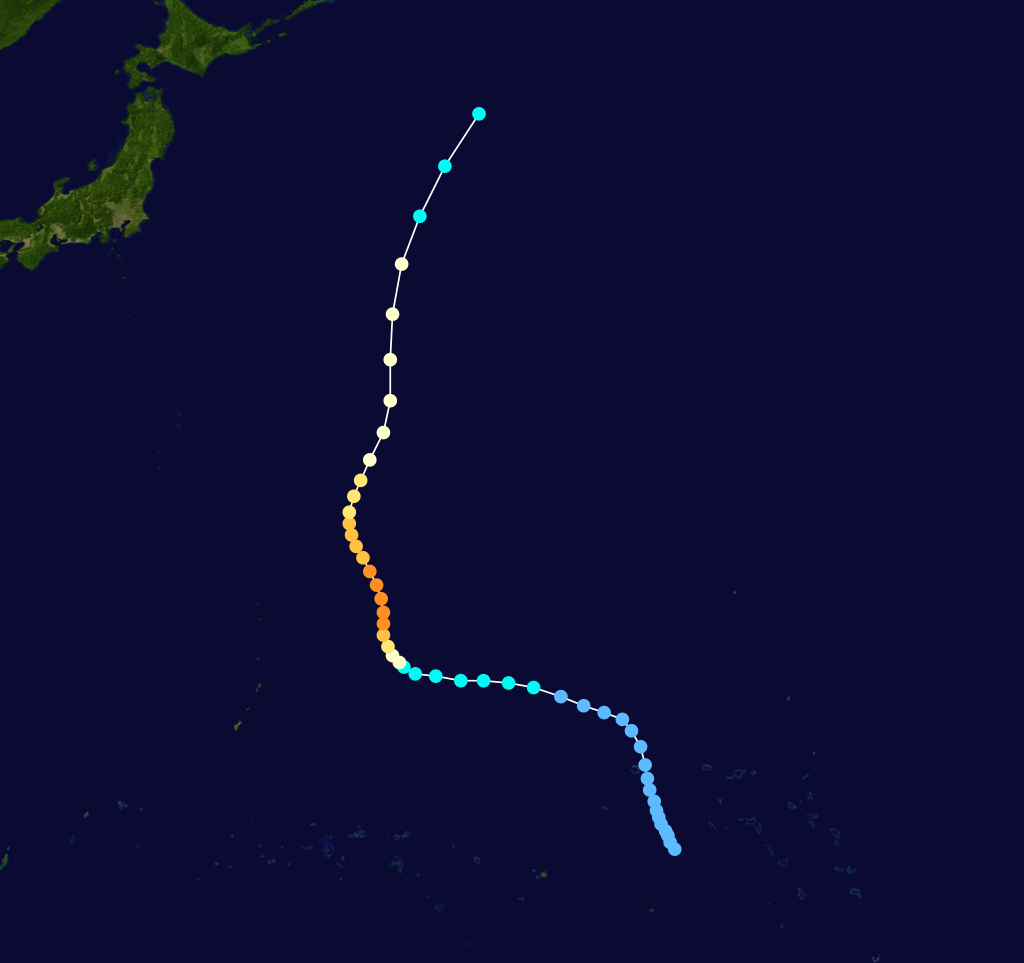
- Duration: October 4 – October 13
- Peak intensity: 175 km/h (110 mph) (10-min); 925 hPa (mbar)

Pat stayed at sea.

=== Typhoon Ruth (Trining) ===
- Violent typhoon (JMA)
- Category 5 super typhoon (SSHWS)
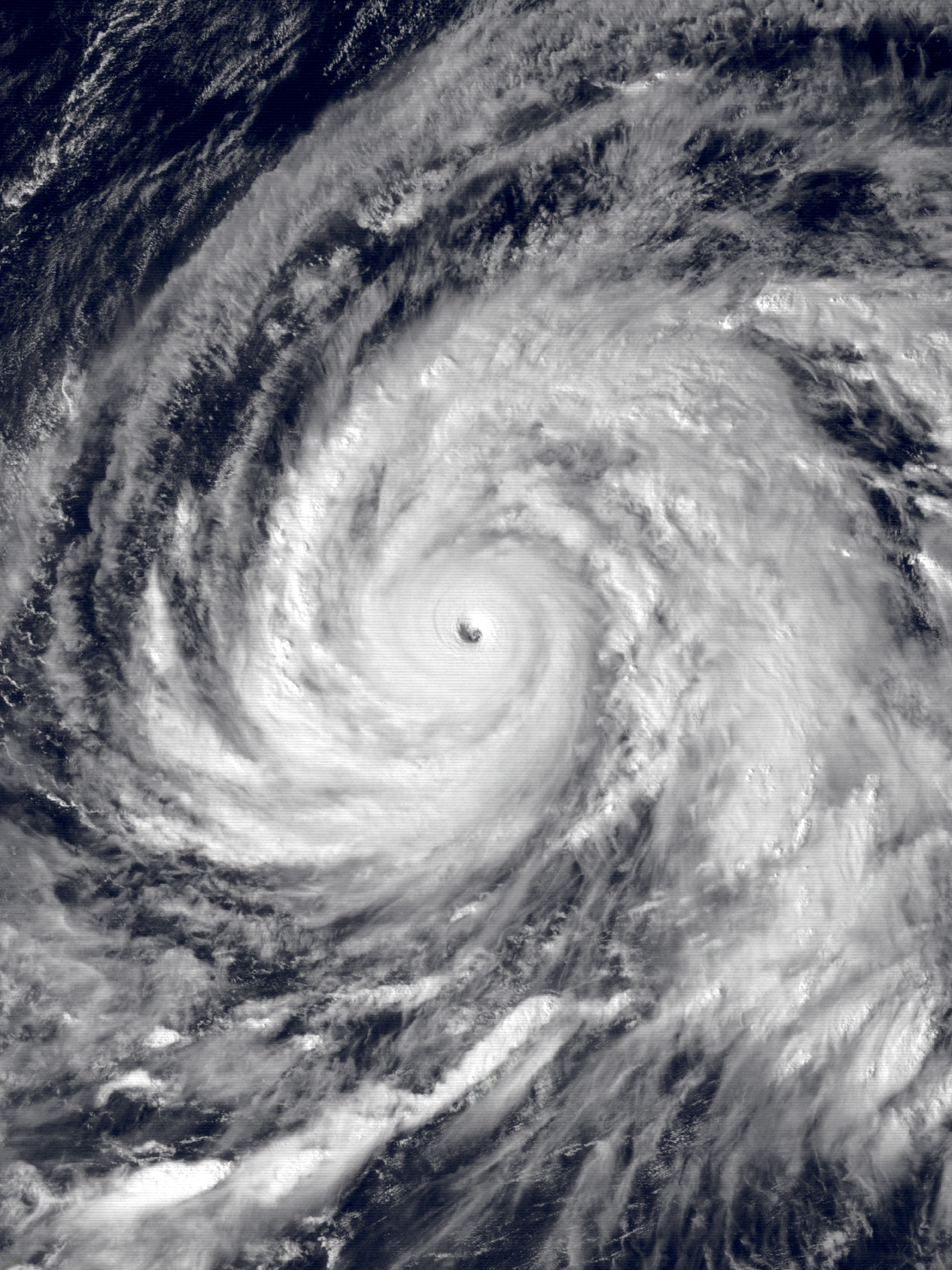
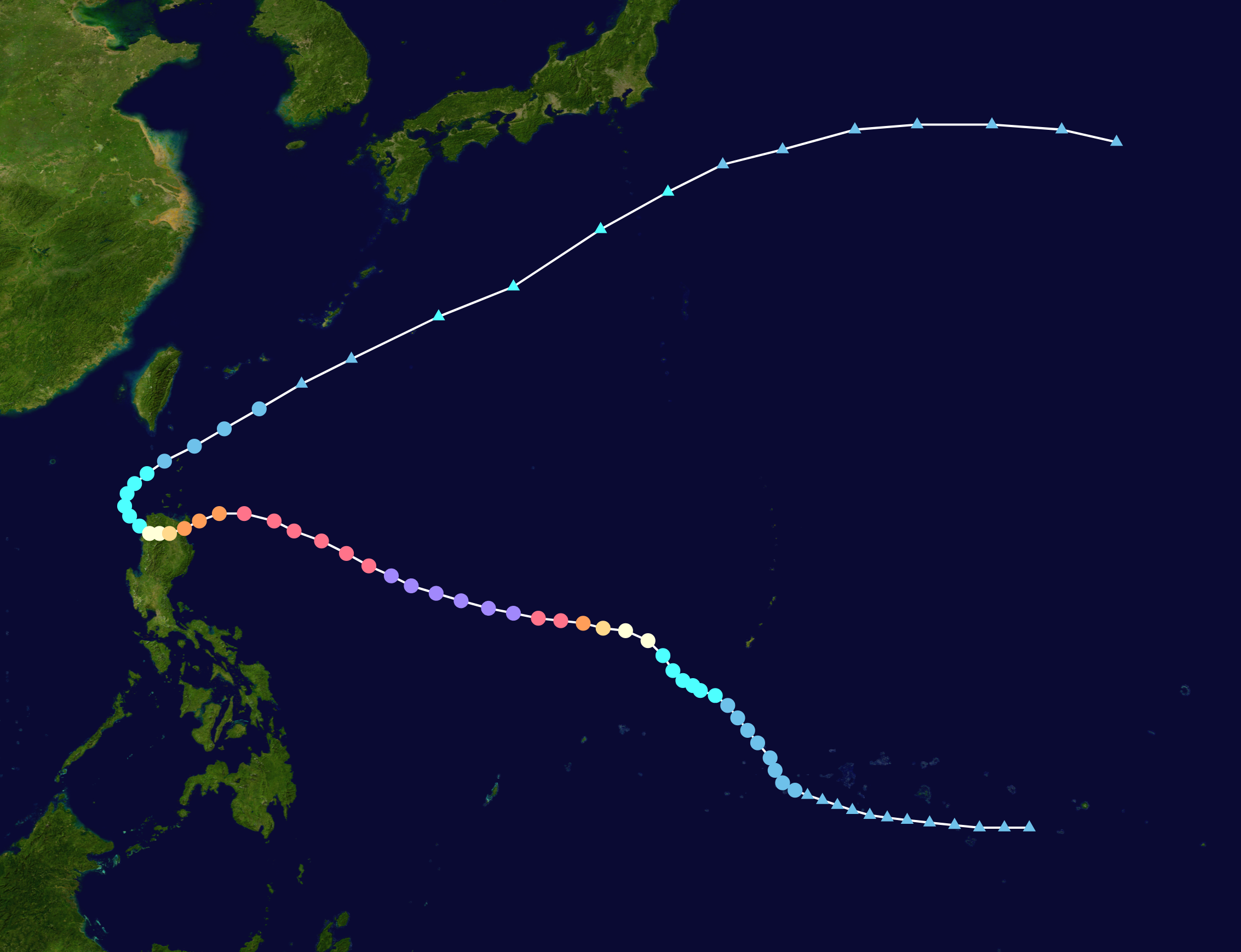
- Duration: October 19 – October 31
- Peak intensity: 215 km/h (130 mph) (10-min); 895 hPa (mbar)

Super Typhoon Ruth formed from a tropical disturbance the originated between Chuuk and Pohnpei, as the disturbance moved on a westerly path, a tropical depression formed on October 20. Tropical Storm Ruth was named on the 21st as the storm moved to the southwest of Guam and began to steadily intensity. Ruth reached typhoon strength on October 22 and became a super typhoon on the 24th as the storm reached peak intensity of 165 mph (266 km/h). Ruth began to slowly decline in strength as it neared the northern Philippines. Ruth made landfall on October 27 on northern Luzon Island with winds of 115 mph (185 km/h) before weakening to a tropical storm. Heavy flooding and numerous landslides were reported on Luzon Island as a result 12 people were killed. After departing Luzon Island Ruth recurved south of Taiwan and dissipated. Heavy seas caused the freighter Tung Lung to sink west of Taiwan, all 18 aboard were killed.

=== Typhoon Seth (Warling) ===
- Very strong typhoon (JMA)
- Category 4 super typhoon (SSHWS)
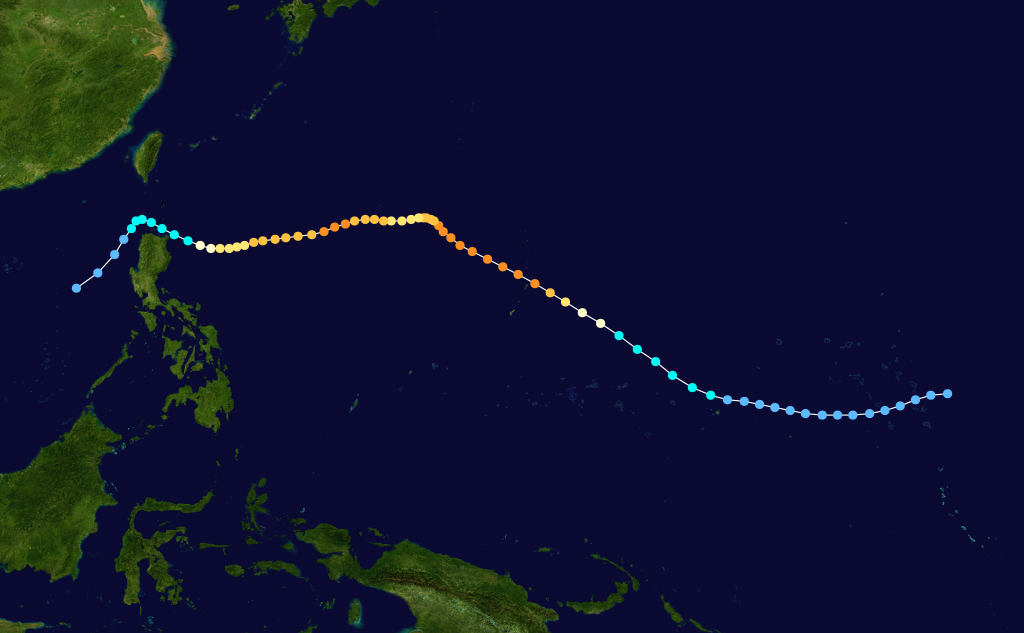
- Duration: November 1 – November 15
- Peak intensity: 185 km/h (115 mph) (10-min); 925 hPa (mbar)

A Category 4 Super Typhoon that affected the northern part of the Philippines. During most of Seth's early life, Seth remained a Tropical Storm, until it encountered warmer waters, where it began to reach its peak intensity on November 5. Seth peaked as a strong category 4 storm, but considerably weakened under typhoon strength when it made landfall in the Philippines as a Tropical Storm. After crossing through the Philippines near the end of its life, Seth stalled and dissipated about halfway between the Philippines and mainland Asia. Seth did feature a well defined eye, and struck the same area of the Philippines right after Super Typhoon Ruth did.

=== Tropical Storm Thelma (Uring) ===
- Tropical storm (JMA)
- Tropical storm (SSHWS)
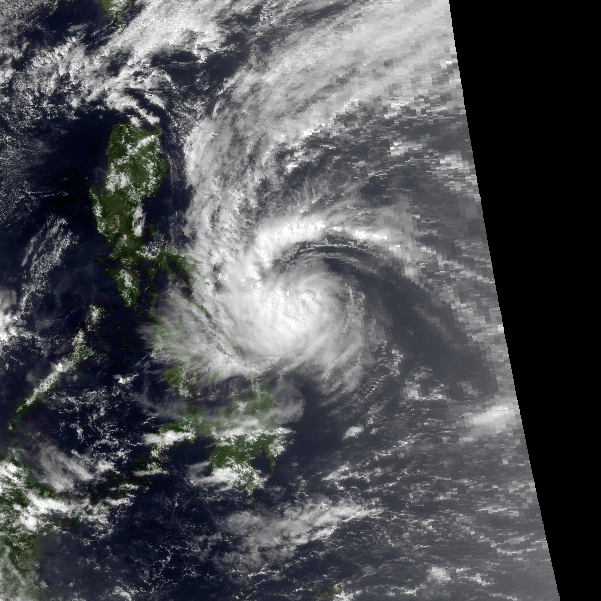
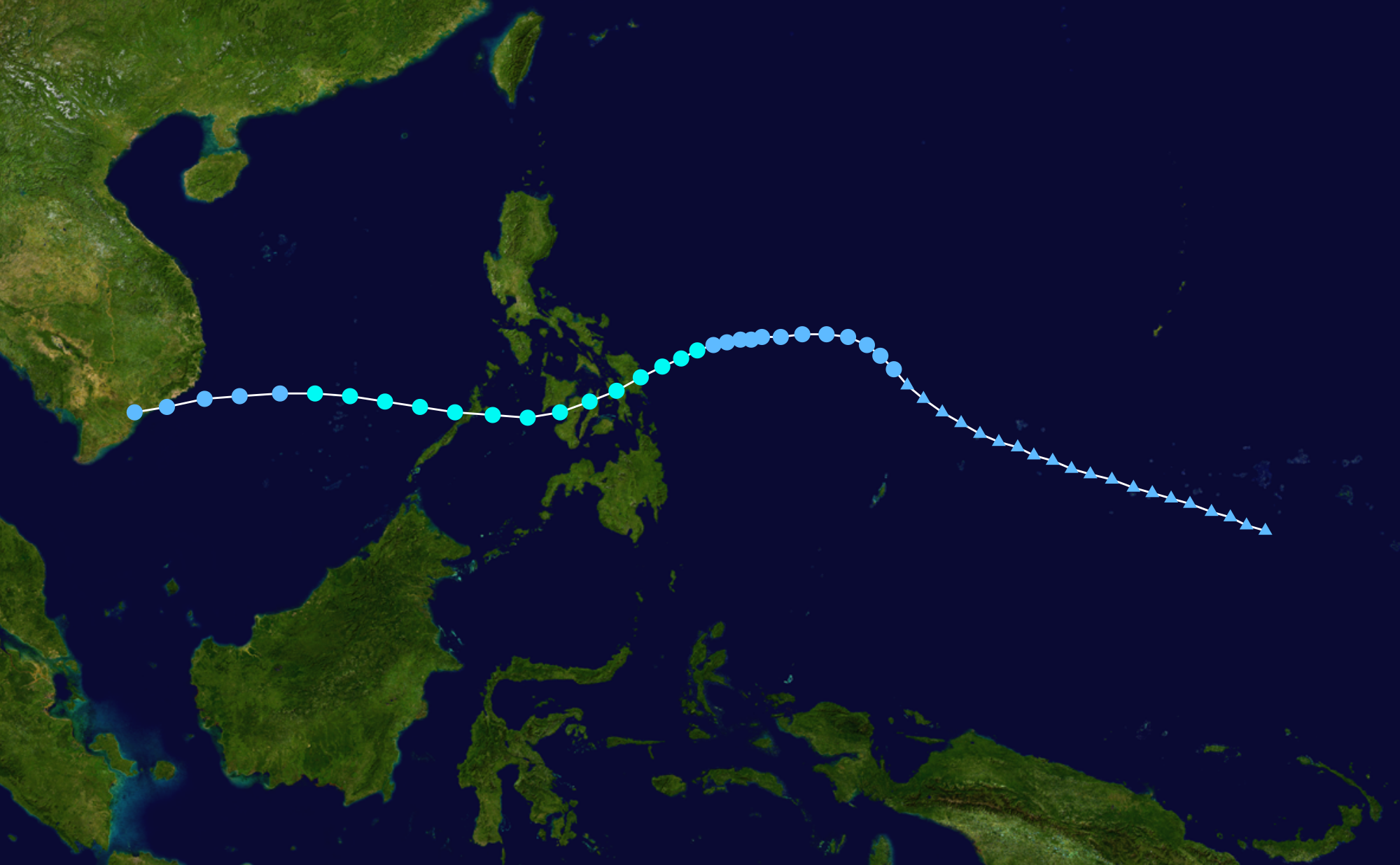
- Duration: November 1 – November 8
- Peak intensity: 75 km/h (45 mph) (10-min); 992 hPa (mbar)

50 mph (80 km/h) Tropical Storm Thelma hit the central Philippines on November 4. It slowly tracked across the Archipelago, bringing heavy flooding across the islands. Vertical shear weakened it as it continued westward, and it dissipated on November 8 just after hitting southern Vietnam. Thelma, though a weak storm, caused dam failures, landslides, and flash flooding, resulting in a horrendous death toll of 6,000 people. Due to the massive casualties, the name Thelma was retired and replaced with Teresa.

=== Severe Tropical Storm Verne ===
- Severe tropical storm (JMA)
- Tropical storm (SSHWS)
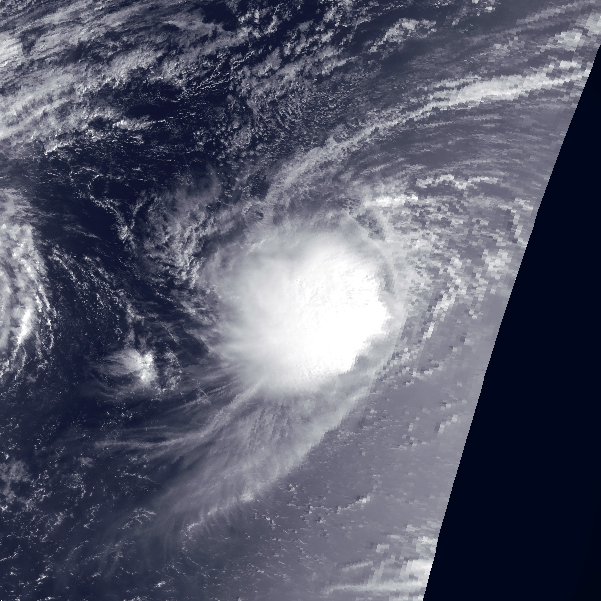
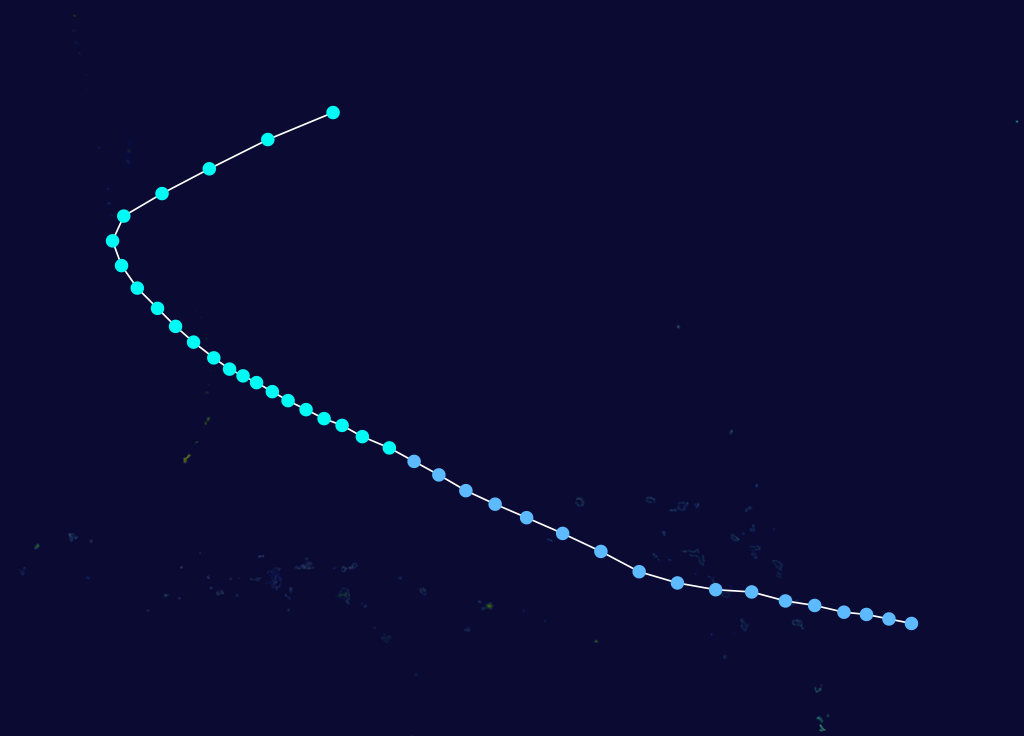
- Duration: November 5 – November 12
- Peak intensity: 100 km/h (65 mph) (10-min); 980 hPa (mbar)

Verne curved away from land.

=== Tropical Storm Wilda (Yayang) ===
- Tropical storm (JMA)
- Tropical storm (SSHWS)
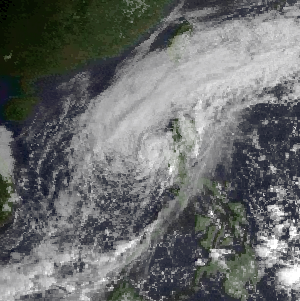
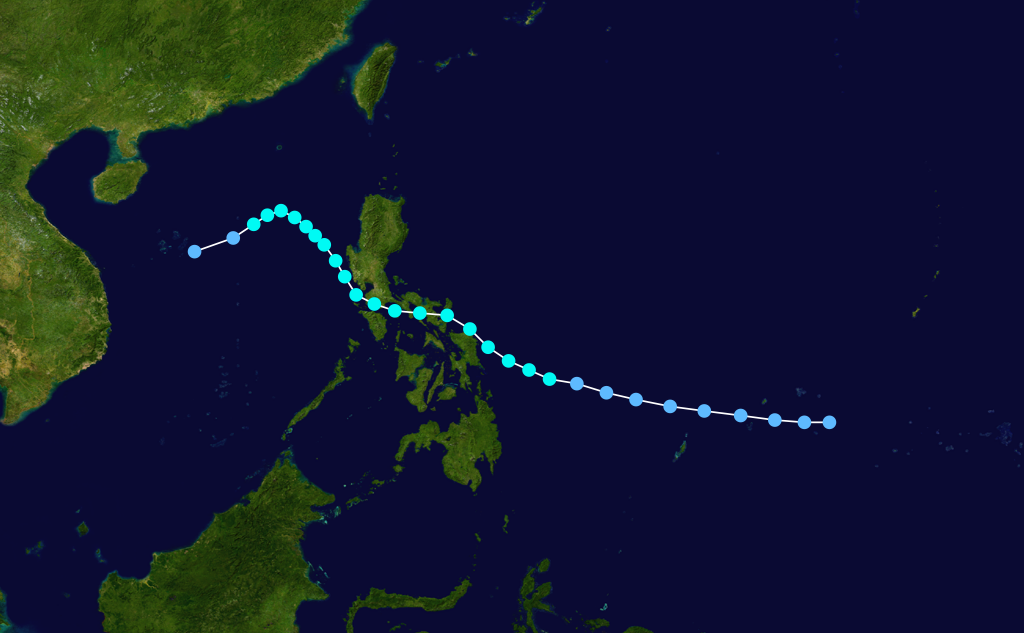
- Duration: November 14 – November 20
- Peak intensity: 85 km/h (50 mph) (10-min); 992 hPa (mbar)

Wilda hit the Philippines.

=== Typhoon Yuri ===
- Violent typhoon (JMA)
- Category 5 super typhoon (SSHWS)
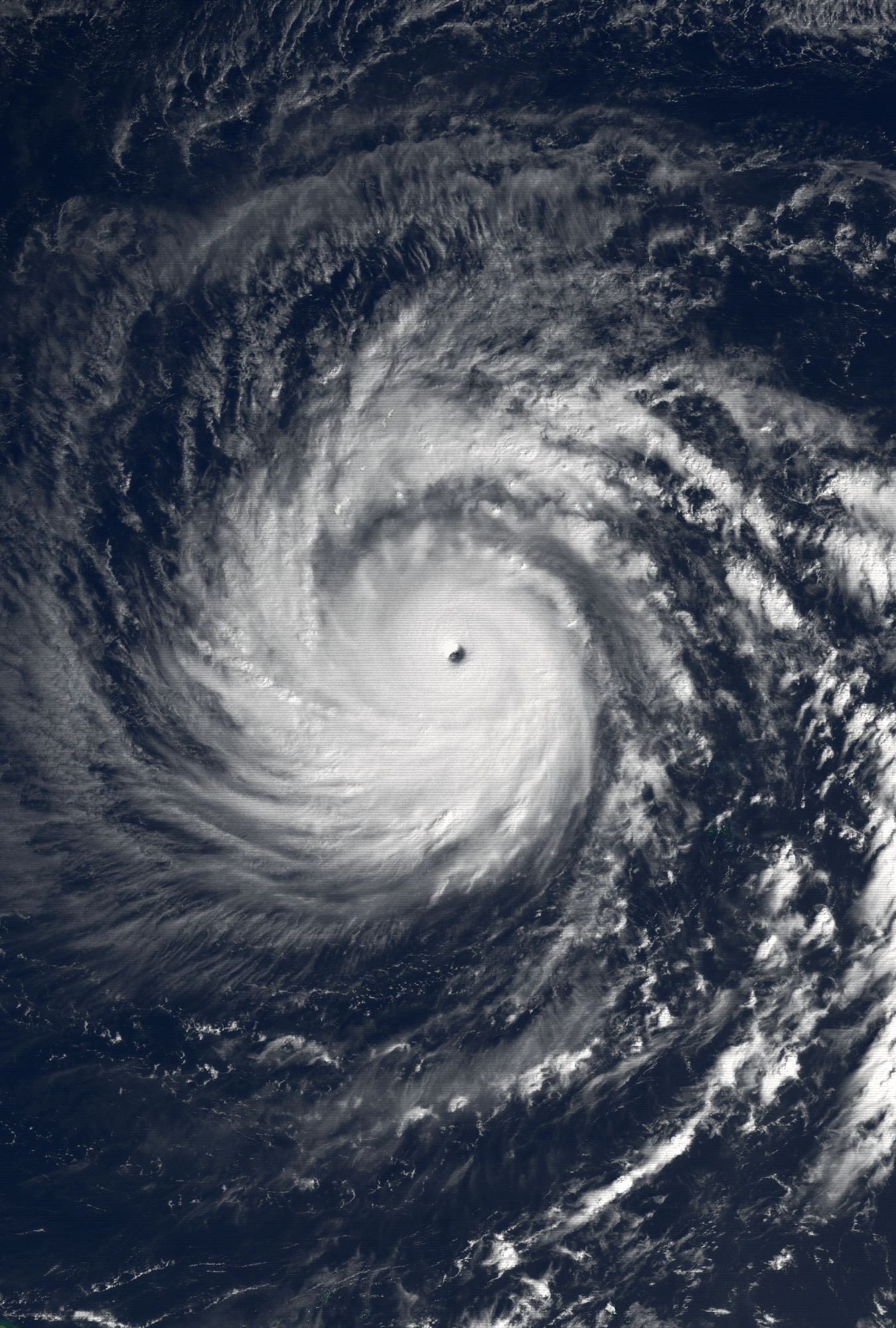
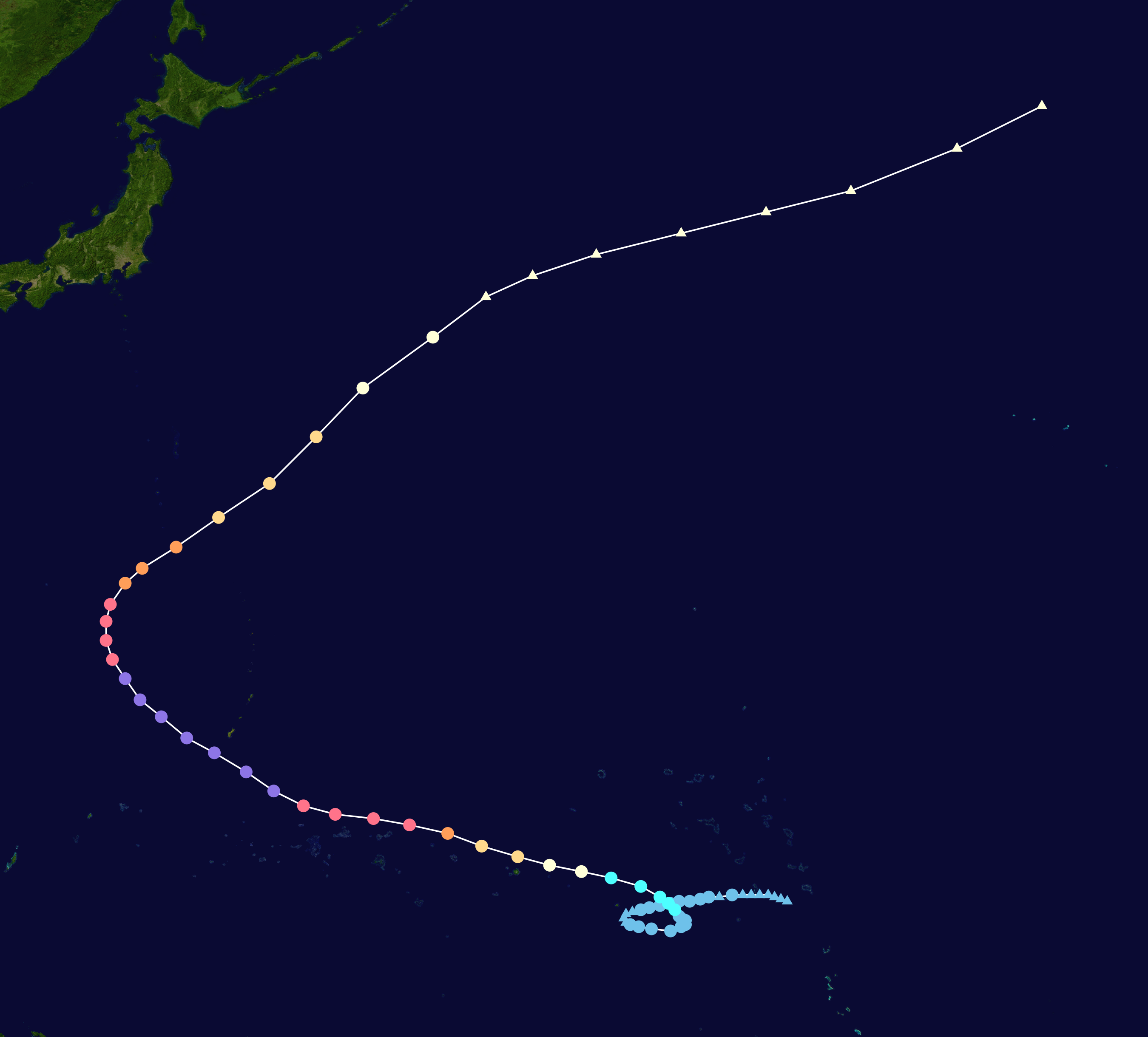
- Duration: November 22 – December 1
- Peak intensity: 220 km/h (140 mph) (10-min); 895 hPa (mbar)

Super Typhoon Yuri was the most powerful storm during the season, with winds reaching up to 120 knots (220 km/h), and a minimum recorded pressure of 895 mbar. This made Yuri the third most intense tropical cyclone on record at the end of 1991. Yuri caused $3 million (1991 USD) in damage to Pohnpei, including the loss of a radio tower. In Guam, the storm caused extensive beach erosion and destroyed between 60 and 350 buildings. There, damage totaled to $33 million (1991 USD). It is one of the most closely observed storms ever. Its eye was studied for research.

=== Severe Tropical Storm Zelda ===
- Severe tropical storm (JMA)
- Category 1 typhoon (SSHWS)
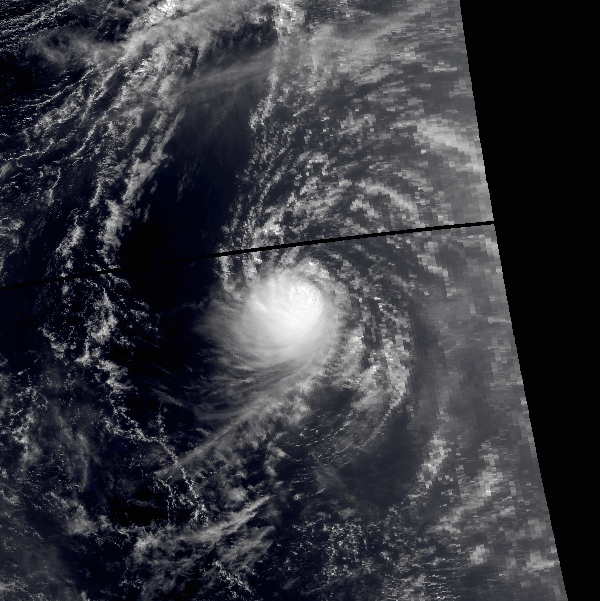
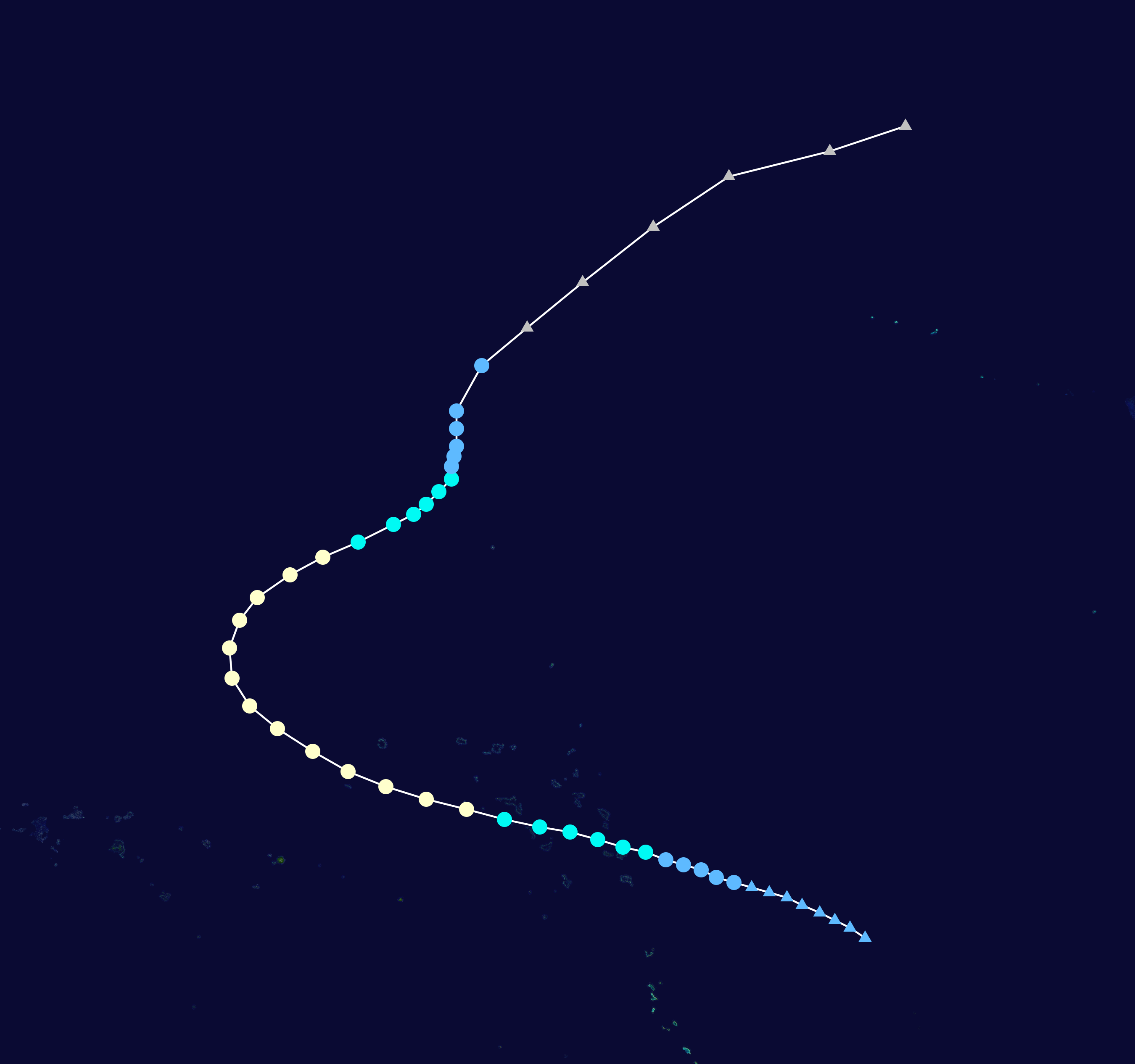
- Duration: November 27 – December 5
- Peak intensity: 110 km/h (70 mph) (10-min); 975 hPa (mbar)

Tropical Storm Zelda was the last storm of the 1991 Pacific typhoon season.

== Storm names ==
During the season 29 named tropical cyclones developed in the Western Pacific and were named by the Joint Typhoon Warning Center, when it was determined that they had become tropical storms. These names were contributed to a revised list from mid-1989.

Sharon	Tim	Vanessa	Walt	Yunya	Zeke	Amy	Brendan	Caitlin	Doug	Ellie	Fred	Gladys	Harry	Ivy
Joel	Kinna	Luke	Mireille	Nat	Orchid	Pat	Ruth	Seth	Thelma	Verne	Wilda	Yuri	Zelda	

=== Philippines ===
Auring	Bebeng	Karing	Diding	Etang
Gening	Helming	Ising	Luding	Mameng
Neneng	Oniang	Pepang	Rosing	Sendang
Trining	Uring	Warling	Yayang	
Auxiliary list
				Ading (unused)
Barang (unused)	Krising (unused)	Dadang (unused)	Erling (unused)	Goying (unused)

The Philippine Atmospheric, Geophysical and Astronomical Services Administration uses its own naming scheme for tropical cyclones in their area of responsibility. PAGASA assigns names to tropical depressions that form within their area of responsibility and any tropical cyclone that might move into their area of responsibility. Should the list of names for a given year prove to be insufficient, names are taken from an auxiliary list, the first 10 of which are published each year before the season starts. Names not retired from this list will be used again in the 1995 season. This is the same list used for the 1987 season. PAGASA uses its own naming scheme that starts in the Filipino alphabet, with names of Filipino female names ending with "ng" (A, B, K, D, etc.). Names that were not assigned/going to use are marked in gray.

=== Retirement ===
Due to extensive damage and a high death toll, the JTWC retired the names Mireille and Thelma, which were replaced by Melissa and Teresa. Both names were first used in the 1994 season. PAGASA also retired the name Uring with similar reasons and was replaced by Ulding for the 1995 season.

== Season effects ==
This table summarizes all the systems that developed within or moved into the North Pacific Ocean, to the west of the International Date Line during 1991. The tables also provide an overview of a systems intensity, duration, land areas affected and any deaths or damages associated with the system.

Name	Dates	Peak intensity			Areas affected	Damage (USD)	Deaths	Ref(s).
Name	Dates	Category	Wind speed	Pressure	Areas affected	Damage (USD)	Deaths	Ref(s).
Sharon (Auring)	March 5 – 16	Severe tropical storm	95 km/h (60 mph)	985 hPa (29.09 inHg)	Caroline Islands, Philippines	None	None	
Tim	March 20 – 27	Typhoon	120 km/h (75 mph)	970 hPa (28.64 inHg)	Philippines, Japan	None	None	
Vanessa (Bebeng)	April 23 – 28	Tropical storm	85 km/h (50 mph)	994 hPa (29.35 inHg)	Philippines, Vietnam, China	None	None	
Walt (Karing)	May 5 – 17	Very strong typhoon	185 km/h (115 mph)	915 hPa (27.02 inHg)	Caroline Islands, Mariana Islands, Philippines, Taiwan, Ryukyu Islands	None	None	
TD	May 20	Tropical depression	Not specified	1010 hPa (29.83 inHg)	None	None	None	
Yunya (Diding)	June 12 – 17	Typhoon	150 km/h (90 mph)	950 hPa (28.05 inHg)	Philippines	None	6 (320)	
TD	June 14 – 19	Tropical depression	Not specified	1002 hPa (29.59 inHg)	Caroline Islands	None	None	
TD	June 18 – 19	Tropical depression	Not specified	1006 hPa (29.59 inHg)	Mariana Islands	None	None	
Zeke (Etang)	July 9 – 15	Typhoon	120 km/h (75 mph)	970 hPa (28.79 inHg)	Philippines, South China	$960 million	33	
Amy (Gening)	July 14 – 20	Very strong typhoon	175 km/h (110 mph)	930 hPa (27.46 inHg)	Philippines, Taiwan, China	$4.87 billion	136	
TD	July 14 – 18	Tropical depression	Not specified	1002 hPa (29.59 inHg)	Philippines	None	None	
Brendan (Helming)	July 19 – 25	Severe tropical storm	110 km/h (70 mph)	980 hPa (28.94 inHg)	Philippines, Taiwan, South China	$253 million	34	
Caitlin (Ising)	July 21 – 30	Typhoon	150 km/h (90 mph)	940 hPa (27.76 inHg)	Philippines, Taiwan, Japan, South Korea	$81.3 million	26	
Enrique	July 31 – August 1	Tropical depression	65 km/h (40 mph)	1016 hPa (30.01 inHg)	None	None	None	
TD	August 2	Tropical depression	Not specified	1002 hPa (29.59 inHg)	None	None	None	
Doug	August 7 – 10	Tropical depression	65 km/h (40 mph)	1000 hPa (29.53 inHg)	None	None	None	
Ellie (Mameng)	August 10 – 19	Typhoon	130 km/h (80 mph)	960 hPa (28.35 inHg)	Ryukyu Islands, Taiwan, East China	None	None	
Fred (Luding)	August 11 – 18	Typhoon	150 km/h (90 mph)	1000 hPa (27.53 inHg)	Philippines, South China, Vietnam, Laos, Thailand	$121 million	38	
13W	August 11 – 13	Tropical depression	45 km/h (30 mph)	1002 hPa (29.59 inHg)	None	None	None	
Gladys	August 15 – 24	Severe tropical storm	110 km/h (70 mph)	965 hPa (28.65 inHg)	Japan, Korean Peninsula, Northeast China	$253 million	113	
TD	August 19 – 24	Tropical depression	Not specified	996 hPa (29.41 inHg)	None	None	None	
15W	August 26 – 30	Tropical depression	55 km/h (35 mph)	992 hPa (29.29 inHg)	Japan, South Korea	None	None	
Harry	August 28 – 31	Tropical storm	75 km/h (45 mph)	992 hPa (29.29 inHg)	Japan, South Korea	None	None	
Ivy	September 2 – 10	Very strong typhoon	175 km/h (110 mph)	935 hPa (27.61 inHg)	Caroline Islands, Mariana Islands, Japan	$12 million	1	
Joel	September 3 – 8	Tropical storm	85 km/h (50 mph)	985 hPa (29.09 inHg)	Philippines, China, Taiwan	$74.1 million	5	
Kinna (Neneng)	September 10 – 14	Typhoon	150 km/h (90 mph)	955 hPa (28.20 inHg)	Japan, Korean Peninsula	$383 million	11	
Mireille (Rosing)	September 13 – 28	Very strong typhoon	185 km/h (115 mph)	925 hPa (27.32 inHg)	Marshall Islands, Mariana Islands, Japan, Korean Peninsula, Russia Far East	$10 billion	68	
Luke (Pepang)	September 14 – 19	Severe tropical storm	100 km/h (65 mph)	980 hPa (28.94 inHg)	Mariana Islands, Japan	$179 million	12	
Nat (Oniang)	September 14 – October 3	Typhoon	150 km/h (90 mph)	950 hPa (28.05 inHg)	Philippines, Taiwan, China	$16.7 million	2	
Orchid (Sendang)	October 3 – 14	Very strong typhoon	175 km/h (110 mph)	930 hPa (27.46 inHg)	Guam, Japan	$15.8 million	3	
Pat	October 4 – 13	Typhoon	150 km/h (90 mph)	925 hPa (27.32 inHg)	Mariana Islands	None	None	
Ruth (Trining)	October 19 – 31	Violent typhoon	215 km/h (130 mph)	895 hPa (26.43 inHg)	Caroline Islands, Mariana Islands, Taiwan, Philippines	$151 million	82	
Seth (Warling)	November 1 – 15	Very strong typhoon	185 km/h (115 mph)	925 hPa (27.32 inHg)	Marshall Islands, Caroline Islands, Mariana Islands, Philippines	Unknown	None	
Thelma (Uring)	November 1 – 8	Tropical storm	75 km/h (45 mph)	992 hPa (29.29 inHg)	Philippines, Vietnam	$27.7 million	5,081	
Verne	November 5 – 12	Severe tropical storm	100 km/h (65 mph)	980 hPa (28.94 inHg)	Marshall Islands, Caroline Islands, Mariana Islands	None	None	
Wilda (Yayang)	November 14 – 31	Tropical storm	85 km/h (50 mph)	992 hPa (29.29 inHg)	Philippines	None	None	
Yuri	November 22 – December 1	Violent typhoon	220 km/h (140 mph)	895 hPa (26.43 inHg)	Marshall Islands, Caroline Islands, Mariana Islands	$36 million	None	
Zelda	November 27 – December 5	Severe tropical storm	110 km/h (70 mph)	975 hPa (28.79 inHg)	Marshall Islands	None	None	
Season aggregates
38 systems	March 5 – December 5, 1991		220 km/h (140 mph)	895 hPa (26.43 inHg)		$17.4 billion	~5,644 (320)	

== See also ==
- Tropical cyclones in 1991
- 1991 Atlantic hurricane season
- 1991 Pacific hurricane season
- 1991 North Indian Ocean cyclone season
- South-West Indian Ocean cyclone season: 1990–91, 1991–92
- Australian region cyclone season: 1990–91, 1991–92
- South Pacific cyclone season: 1990–91, 1991–92
