= List of named storms (Z) =

Storms are named for historical reasons to avoid confusion when communicating with the public, as more than one storm can exist at a time. Names are drawn in order from predetermined lists. For tropical cyclones, names are assigned when a system has one-, three-, or ten-minute winds of more than 65 km/h (40 mph). Standards, however, vary from basin to basin. For example, some tropical depressions are named in the Western Pacific, while within the Australian and Southern Pacific regions, the naming of tropical cyclones are delayed until they have gale-force winds occurring more than halfway around the storm center.

This list covers the letter Z.

== Storms ==
Note: † indicates the name was retired after that usage in the respective basin.

- Zack

- 1992 – a tropical storm that remained over the open western Pacific Ocean.
- 1995 – a Category 4 equivalent typhoon that struck the Philippines and Vietnam, killing 110 people; also known as Pepang within the Philippine Area of Responsibility (PAR).

- Zaka

- 1996 – a weak tropical cyclone that passed near New Caledonia, causing minor damage.
- 2011 – a tropical cyclone that dissipated northeast of New Zealand, causing no damage.

- Zane

- 1996 – Category 3 equivalent typhoon that crossed the Ryukyu Islands; also known as Paring within the PAR.
- 2013 – developed and dissipated between Queensland and Papua New Guinea.

- Zazu (2020) – a tropical cyclone that brought heavy surf to Niue and hurricane-force wind gusts to Tonga, but caused no significant damage.
- Zeb (1998) – a Category 5 equivalent typhoon that killed 122 people when it struck Luzon; also known as Iliang within the PAR.
- Zeke

- 1991 – passed over the Philippines before hitting Hainan; also known as Etang within the PAR.
- 1992 – a tropical storm off the coast of southwestern Mexico.
- 1994 – a typhoon that remained east of Japan.

- Zelda

- 1991 – a severe tropical storm that caused damage in the Marshall Islands.
- 1994 – Category 4 super typhoon that passed over the Northern Mariana Islands during its circuitous track through the western Pacific Ocean; also known as Esang within the PAR.

- Zelia

- 1998 – a tropical cyclone that developed near Cocos Islands.
- 2011 – severe tropical cyclone that brought heavy rainfall to New Zealand as an extratropical cyclone.
- 2025† – a Category 5 severe tropical cyclone that made landfall in the Western Australia.

- Zena (2016) – a Category 2 tropical cyclone that passed near Fiji.
- Zeta

- 2005 – an end-of-the-year storm that remained out at sea; one of only two Atlantic tropical cyclones on record to span two calendar years.
- 2020 – a Category 3 hurricane that made landfall on the Yucatán Peninsula and then in southeastern Louisiana.

- Zia (1999) – a tropical storm that moved across Japan, killing nine.
- Zigzag (2003) – a tropical storm that made landfall in northeastern Mindanao; deemed a tropical depression by the Japan Meteorological Agency.
- Zita

- 1997 – was a short-lived tropical cyclone that killed seven people in southern China, and caused damage in both Chia and Vietnam, where there was additional loss of life; also known as Luming within the PAR>
- 2007 – a tropical cyclone that passed through French Polynesia.

- Zoe

- 1974 – a severe tropical cyclone that moved along the coast of Queensland.
- 2002† – a Category 5 severe tropical cyclone, and one of the strongest South Pacific tropical cyclones on record in terms atmospheric pressure, that affected the Solomon Islands, Fiji, Vanuatu, and Rotuma.

- Zola

- 1990 – a Category 3 equivalent typhoon that struck Japan, killing 3 people.
- 1993 – a severe tropical storm that made landfall in Japan; also known as Unsing within the PAR.

- Zoraida (2013) – a storm that affected the Philippines and Vietnam; also known as Podul beyond the PAR.
- Zorbas (2018) – a Mediterranean tropical-like cyclone that reached Category 1 equivalent strength.
- Zosimo (2004) – a tropical storm that moved through the Marshall Islands and the Federated States of Micronesia; also known as Talas beyond the PAR.
- Zuman

- 1987 – a short-lived and weak storm that churned in the open South Pacific
- 1998 – a Category 3 severe tropical cyclone that struck Espiritu Santo

== See also ==
- European windstorm names
- Atlantic hurricane season
- Pacific hurricane season
- Tropical cyclone naming
- South Atlantic tropical cyclone
- Tropical cyclone
