= Zola (comics) =

In comics, Zola may refer to:

- Zola (DC Comics), a character in Wonder Woman stories
- Arnim Zola, a Marvel Comics mad scientist

== See also ==
- Zola (disambiguation)
- Zola (name)
