= Zeke (disambiguation) =

Zeke is a masculine given name or nickname.

Zeke may also refer to:

- Zeke, Allied code name for the Mitsubishi A6M Zero Japanese World War II fighter
- Tropical Storm Zeke, two typhoons and a tropical storm, all in the early 1990s
- Zeke, Burkina Faso, a village
- Zeke (band), an American hardcore punk band
- Zero electron kinetic energy spectroscopy, a form of high resolution photoelectron spectroscopy

== See also ==
- Zeek, a free and open-source software network analysis framework
