= 2010–11 Southern Hemisphere tropical cyclone season =

The 2010–11 Southern Hemisphere tropical cyclone season may refer to one of three different basins and respective seasons:

- 2010–11 South-West Indian Ocean cyclone season, west of 90°E
- 2010–11 Australian region cyclone season, between 90°E and 160°E
- 2010–11 South Pacific cyclone season, east of 160°E

Also, Tropical Storm Anita formed during this time period.
