= Richview =

Richview may refer to:

- Richview, Illinois
- Richview, Toronto, a neighbourhood in Toronto, Ontario, Canada
