= Zola =

Zola may refer to:

- Zola (name), a list of people with either the surname, given name, stagename or nickname; and fictional characters
  - Émile Zola, a great 19th-century French writer

== Places ==
- Zola (crater) on Mercury
- Zola, Iran, a village in West Azerbaijan Province
- Zola, Soweto, a township in South Africa
- Zola, a village on the Greek island of Kefalonia

=== Fictional locations ===
- Zola, a planet in the animated video series Macross Dynamite 7

== Music ==
- The Zolas, a Canadian rock band
- Zola (rapper) (born 1999), or Aurélien N'Zuzi Zola, a French rapper
- Zola (soundtrack), 2021

== Other uses ==
- Zola (company), an online wedding registry, wedding planner, and retailer
- Zola (film), a 2020 American black comedy film
- Zola (moth), a genus of moth
- Typhoon Zola, two tropical cyclones in the northwestern Pacific

== See also ==
- Zolaism
- Zolo (disambiguation)
