= Ziola =

Ziola or Zioła is a surname. Notable people with the surname include:

- Kirk Ziola, Canadian curler
- Piotr Zioła (born 1995), Polish singer
- David E. Ziola, (born 1964, Grand Island, Nebraska USA. County Commissioner 2011–2015.

== See also ==
- Zola (name)
