= List of storms named Zelia =

The name Zelia has been used for three tropical cyclones in the Australian region:

- Cyclone Zelia (1998) – an early-season tropical cyclone which affected no land areas.
- Cyclone Zelia (2011) – a strong tropical cyclone which crossed into the South Pacific basin and affected New Zealand as a post-tropical system.
- Cyclone Zelia (2025) – a Category 4-equivalent (Category 5 on the Australian scale) tropical cyclone that made a catastrophic landfall on Western Australia's Pilbara region.

After the 2025 storm, the name Zelia was retired. It was replaced with Zhu for future seasons.
