= Typhoon Caitlin =

Pacific typhoon in 1991

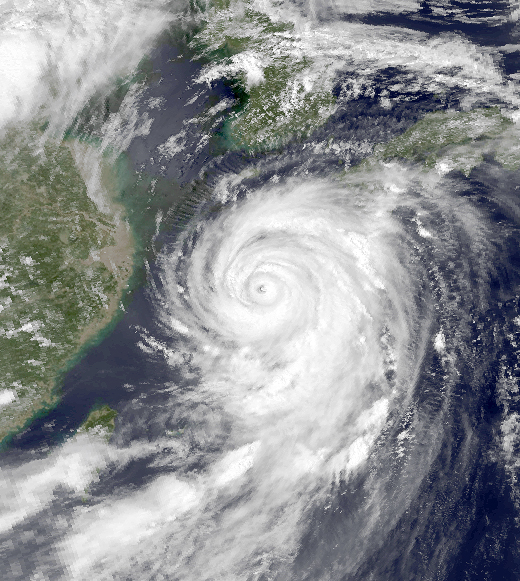
- Typhoon Caitlin early on July 28

Meteorological history
- Formed: July 21, 1991
- Dissipated: July 30, 1991

Typhoon
- 10-minute sustained (JMA)
- Highest winds: 150 km/h (90 mph)
- Lowest pressure: 940 hPa (mbar); 27.76 inHg

Category 2-equivalent typhoon
- 1-minute sustained (SSHWS/JTWC)
- Highest winds: 175 km/h (110 mph)
- Lowest pressure: 949 hPa (mbar); 28.02 inHg

Overall effects
- Fatalities: 26 total
- Damage: $81.3 million (1991 USD)
- Areas affected: Philippines, Japan, South Korea
- IBTrACS
- Part of the 1991 Pacific typhoon season

Typhoon Caitlin, known in the Philippines as Typhoon Ising, contributed to major drought relief in Okinawa. A tropical disturbance formed in the middle of July 1991 in the eastern portion of the Western Pacific monsoon trough, and while tracking to the west-northwest, was designated a tropical depression on July 21. Thunderstorm activity associated with the depression increased markedly on July 22, and two days later, the depression was upgraded into Tropical Storm Caitlin. The storm turned northward as it rounded a subtropical ridge while gradually intensifying. Caitlin became a typhoon on July 25 and peaked in intensity on July 27 near Okinawa. The typhoon began to weaken as it turned northeast over the Korea Strait. On July 30, Catlin transitioned into an extratropical cyclone as it entered the Sea of Japan.

Across the Philippines, heavy rains triggered mudslides that claimed 16 lives and forced over 20,000 others to be evacuated. Due to the storm, reservoir levels in Okinawa on the island rose from only 35% to over 80% of its capacity and crop damage amounted to 7.4 million US$. On Kagoshima Prefecture, 72 homes were damaged and five million people were left without power. Twenty-three people suffered injuries in Nagasaki Prefecture while 116 ships were damaged offshore. On the Goto Islands, 32 people were rendered homeless. Throughout Japan, six fatalities were reported and thirty-nine others sustained injuries. A total of 64 houses were destroyed while 1,472 others were flooded. Moreover, 120 ships and 263 ha (650 acres) of farmland were destroyed. Damages totaled ¥10.1 billion (US$75 million). In South Korea, two people were killed and another two were listed as missing. Heavy rains caused flooding across residential areas and destroyed farmland. Around 30 ships were destroyed or damaged. Damage throughout the country was estimated at US$6.3 million.

== Meteorological history ==
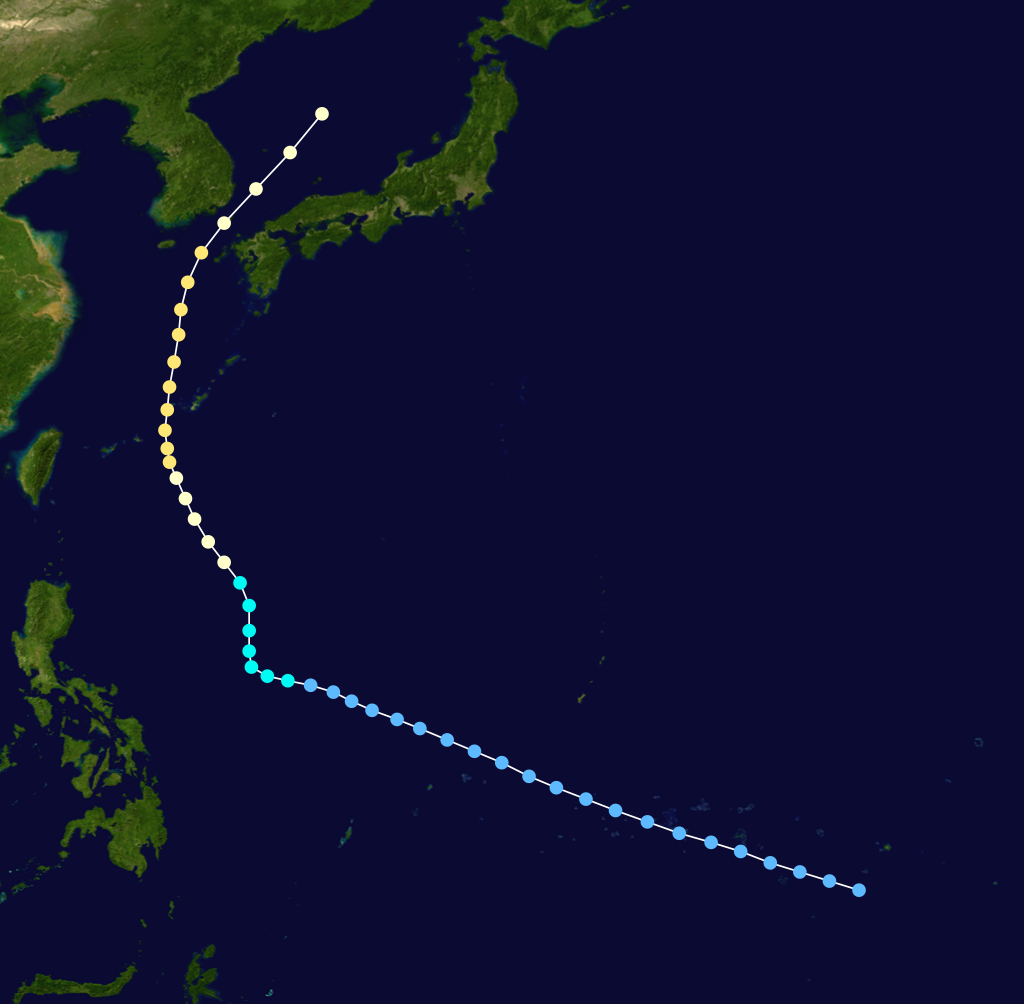
Map plotting the storm's track and intensity, according to the Saffir–Simpson scale Map key Saffir–Simpson scale Tropical depression (≤38 mph, ≤62 km/h) Tropical storm (39–73 mph, 63–118 km/h) Category 1 (74–95 mph, 119–153 km/h) Category 2 (96–110 mph, 154–177 km/h) Category 3 (111–129 mph, 178–208 km/h) Category 4 (130–156 mph, 209–251 km/h) Category 5 (≥157 mph, ≥252 km/h) Unknown Storm type Tropical cyclone Subtropical cyclone Extratropical cyclone, remnant low, tropical disturbance, or monsoon depression

The origins of Typhoon Caitlin can be traced back to a disturbance that formed in the middle of July in the eastern portion of the Western Pacific monsoon trough that extended south of Pohnpei in the eastern Caroline Islands. The disturbance moved west-northwestward, and although the low level center was initially displaced to the west of the deep convection, the Joint Typhoon Warning Center (JTWC) began tracking the system at 06:00 UTC on July 20. On the next day, the Japan Meteorological Agency (JMA) designated the system a tropical depression. (Note: The Japan Meteorological Agency is the official Regional Specialized Meteorological Center for the western Pacific Ocean.) Wind shear began to diminish on July 22, coinciding with falling pressures at Yap and increased convective activity. At 05:00 UTC on July 23, a Tropical Cyclone Formation Alert was issued by the JTWC, and eight hours later, the JTWC declared the system Tropical Depression 09W. On July 24, the Philippine Atmospheric, Geophysical and Astronomical Services Administration (PAGASA) also started watching the storm and assigned it the local name Ising. A rapid increase in convection prompted both the JTWC and JMA to upgrade the depression into Tropical Storm Caitlin the same day. (Note: Wind estimates from the JMA and most other basins throughout the world are sustained over 10 minutes, while estimates from the United States-based Joint Typhoon Warning Center are sustained over 1 minute. 10-minute winds are about 1.14 times the amount of 1-minute winds.)

Tropical Storm Caitlin tracked west-northwestward until July 24, when a semi-permanent subtropical ridge weakened near 130°E, which caused the tropical storm to make a sharp northward turn; this turn was forecast well in advance by the Navy Operational Global Prediction System. Caitlin slowly intensified, and on the evening of July 24, the JMA classified Caitlin as a severe tropical storm. Satellite imagery depicted a cloud-filled eye, and midday on July 25, the JTWC upgraded Caitlin into a typhoon, with the JMA following suit that evening. At the time of the upgrade, Typhoon Caitlin was located around 440 km (275 mi) south of Okinawa. Continuing to intensify, Caitlin turned to the north-northwest. The typhoon passed 110 km (70 mi) west of Kadena Air Base at 15:32 UTC on July 27. Less than three hours later, the JTWC reported that Caitlin attained its peak intensity of 175 km/h (110 mph). Meanwhile, the JMA estimated a peak intensity of 145 km/h (90 mph) and a minimum barometric pressure of 940 mbar (28 inHg). After passing Okinawa, the typhoon tracked north-northeastward around the periphery of a broad subtropical ridge. On July 29, Caitlin, while weakening, accelerated towards the northeast through the Korea Strait, and gradually transitioned into a typhoon force extratropical low as it moved into the Sea of Japan. The JTWC issued its final warning was issued early on July 30 when satellite imagery indicated the system had lost most of its tropical characteristics. Six hours later, the JMA also declared Caitlin extratropical.

== Impact ==
=== Philippines ===
The typhoon enhanced the monsoon across the northern Philippines, and caused rainfall to areas already deluged by prior floods. Manila received 210 mm (8.38 in) of rain on July 26; the rain triggered mudslides in the valleys near Mount Pinatubo while widespread flooding resulted in 16 deaths and the evacuation of more than 20,000 people.

=== Japan ===
The typhoon dropped heavy rainfall across much of the Japanese archipelago, as far south as Okinawa and as far north as Chūbu region. A peak rainfall total occurred of 468 mm (18.4 in) at Mount Akita-Komagatake. A peak hourly rainfall total of 68 mm (2.7 in) was observed in Yusuhara. Meanwhile, a peak daily precipitation total of 301 mm (11.9 in) fell in Naha. Nearby, Kadena Air Base recorded a total of 320 mm (12.51 in) of rain during a four-day period, which was its heaviest precipitation record there since 1987. A wind gust of 116 km/h (72 mph) was recorded on Tokashiki Island. Nationwide, six fatalities were reported and thirty-nine others sustained injuries. A total 64 houses were destroyed while 1,472 others were flooded. Moreover, 120 ships were damaged. Monetary damage totaled ¥10.1 billion (US$75 million). (Note: All currencies are converted from Japanese yen to United States Dollars using this with an exchange rate of the year 1991.) (Note: All damage totals are in 1991 values of their respective currencies.)

Caitlin provided welcome relief to the drought-stricken island of Okinawa, which caused the reservoir levels on the island to rise from only 35% to over 80% of its capacity. Islandwide, one death and eight injuries were attributed to Caitlin. Crop damage was estimated at $7.4 million while U.S. military damage exceeded $1.2 million. On Shikoku Island, damage in Kōchi Prefecture was estimated at ¥132 million. Seventy-two homes were damaged on Kyushu in Kagoshima Prefecture. Five million people in the prefecture lost power. Damage there totaled ¥768 million. A 42-year-old man from Hyūga died due to a lightning strike. Seven homes were damaged in Kumamoto Prefecture. Damage to 22 fishing boats in the prefecture amounted for ¥456 million. Twenty-three people were wounded in Nagasaki Prefecture, including one who suffered a spinal cord injury due to strong winds. A total of 116 ships were damaged. Along the Goto Islands, many homes were destroyed, resulting in 32 homeless. Damage through the prefecture amounted to ¥3.86 billion. A 3 m (10 ft) wall collapsed in Oita Prefecture, killing one person. In separate incidents, three people were wounded. In Saga Prefecture, three hundred and twenty-six homes were damaged and three other were destroyed while three individuals were hurt. One person perished and two others were injured in Fukuoka Prefecture. Six homes were also damaged. Monetary damage estimates exceeded ¥294 million.

On Honshu, two fatalities were reported in Kyoto Prefecture due to strong winds. Storm surge also damaged 47 dwellings. Elsewhere, 36 flights at the Kobe Airport were cancelled. A total of 758 ha (1,870 acres) of arable land was damaged in Tottori prefecture. Eighteen homes were damaged in eastern Shimane Prefecture. There, damage was estimated at ¥146 million. Five homes were damaged or destroyed and seventy other lost power in Fukui Prefecture. Across southern portions of Nagano Prefecture, 20 cars were stranded in floodwaters.

=== South Korea ===
Prior to affecting South Korea, typhoon warnings were posted for the entire country. The U.S. military television network on South Korea went overtime to broadcast warnings. In advance of the storm, flights in and out of Cheju were cancelled. In all, two people were killed and another two were reported missing. Torrential rains caused flooding in residential areas and destroyed farmland. About 30 ships were destroyed or damaged. Five roads, a 500 m (1,600 ft) long railway, and a bridge were also damaged. Damage amounted to US$6.3 million.

== See also ==
- Typhoon Zola (1990)
