= List of storms named Zola =

The name Zola has been used to name two tropical cyclones in the northwestern Pacific:

- Typhoon Zola (1990) (T9014, 14W) – a Category 3 equivalent typhoon that struck Japan, killing 3 people.
- Tropical Storm Zola (1993) (T9314, 20W, Unsing) – a severe tropical storm that made landfall in Japan.
