= Zolo =

The term Zolo can mean:

- Zolo (toy), an abstract art construction toy.
- Roronoa Zoro (spelled Zolo in some English adaptations), a fictional character in the Japanese manga series One Piece
- Colonel Zolo, villain of the 1984 film Romancing the Stone
- Philadelphia Union, a Major League Soccer expansion team commonly known as the Zolos

== See also ==
- Zola (disambiguation)
