= List of storms named Zaka =

The name Zaka has been used for two tropical cyclones worldwide, both in the Australian Region:

- Cyclone Zaka (1996) – a weak tropical cyclone that passed near New Caledonia, causing minor damage
- Cyclone Zaka (2011) – a tropical cyclone that dissipated northeast of New Zealand, causing no damage
