= List of storms named Zuman =

The name Zuman has been used for two tropical cyclones in the South Pacific Ocean.

- Cyclone Zuman (1987) – a short-lived and weak storm that did not approach any islands
- Cyclone Zuman (1998) – a Category 3 severe tropical cyclone that formed near Vila and struck Espiritu Santo, bringing heavy damage to the island
