= List of storms named Zack =

The name Zack has been used to name two tropical cyclones in the northwestern Pacific:

- Tropical Storm Zack (1992) (T9223, 23W) – a tropical storm that remained over the open western Pacific Ocean.
- Typhoon Zack (1995) (T9520, 28W, Pepang) – a Category 4 equivalent typhoon that struck the Philippines and Vietnam, killing 110 people.
