= List of storms named Zita =

The name Zita has been used for two tropical cyclones worldwide: one each in the Northwestern Pacific Ocean and the South Pacific Ocean.

In the Northwestern Pacific Ocean:

- Tropical Storm Zita (1997) (T9715, 17W, Luming) – was a short-lived tropical cyclone that killed seven people in southern China, and caused widespread damage in both China and Vietnam, where there was additional loss of life.

In the South Pacific Ocean:

- Cyclone Zita (2007) – a tropical cyclone that passed through French Polynesia.
