= Zola (name) =

Zola (/ˈzoʊlə/, French pronunciation: [zɔ.la]) is both a surname and a given name. In Italy, Zola is a common last name. In South Africa, Zola is a Xhosa language name and means "be calm" or "be quiet." A common feminine variation for the name is Nokuzola. The name enjoys widespread popularity in South Africa and is also used in other African nations. Furthermore, Zola is a commonly used name in numerous countries across the globe, including the United States. This name was ranked #990 on the US Popular Names in 2021.

== People ==
Notable people with the name include:

=== Surname ===
- Arlette Zola, Swiss singer
- Aurélien N'Zuzi Zola (born 1999), French rapper known as Zola (rapper)
- Calvin Zola (born 1984), Congo DR footballer
- Émile Zola (1840–1902), French novelist
- Gianfranco Zola (born 1966), Italian football player and manager
- Giuseppe Zola (1672 – 1743) Italian painter
- Irving Zola (1935–1994), American activist and writer

=== Given name ===
- Zola Budd (born 1966), South African athlete
- Zola Cooper (1904–1954), American cancer researcher
- Zola Davis (born 1975), American football player
- Zola Levitt (1938–2006), American religious leader
- Zola Matumona (born 1981), Congo DR footballer
- Zola Taylor (1938–2007), American singer, member of The Platters

=== Stage name ===
- Zola (rapper) (born 1999), or Aurélien N'Zuzi Zola, a French rapper
- Zola 7 (born 1977), also known as Bonginkosi Dlamini or Zola, a South African musician
- Zola Jesus (born 1989), stage name of Nika Roza Danilova, American singer

== Fictional characters ==
- Arnim Zola, a fictional character in the Marvel Comics universe
- Leopold Zola, a fictional character in Marvel Comics, the son of Arnim Zola
- Zola, a character in the Battle Arena Toshinden fighting game series; see List of Battle Arena Toshinden characters
- Zola, a female mercenary and party member in the video game Blue Dragon
- Zola, a villain in the Dick Tracy comic strip; see List of recurring characters in Dick Tracy
- Zola Grey Shepherd, adopted daughter of Meredith Grey and Derek Shepherd on the television series Grey's Anatomy
- Aziah "Zola" King, a fictional character from the film Zola (film)

== See also ==
- The Zolas, a Canadian rock band
- Zola (disambiguation)
