= List of storms named Zane =

The name Zane was used for one tropical cyclone in the Northwestern Pacific Ocean and one in the Australian Region.

In the Northwestern Pacific:

- Typhoon Zane (1996) (T9619, 29W, Paring) – Category 3 equivalent typhoon that crossed the Ryukyu Islands.

In the Australian Region:

- Cyclone Zane (2013) – developed and dissipated between Queensland and Papua New Guinea.
