= List of storms named Zoe =

The name Zoe has been used for two tropical cyclones in the Southwestern Pacific Ocean.

- Cyclone Zoe (1974) – Existed just off the Queensland coast and made a landfall near Brisbane.
- Cyclone Zoe (2002) – One of the most intense tropical cyclones ever observed in the South Pacific, reached Category 5 strength and affected several of the Solomon Islands.
