= Richview, Illinois =

Richview
- Village
- Location of Richview in Washington County, Illinois.
- Coordinates: 38°22′24″N 89°10′55″W
- Country: United States
- State: Illinois
- County: Washington

Area
  - Total: 1.15 sq mi (2.97 km^{2})
  - Land: 1.15 sq mi (2.97 km^{2})
  - Water: 0 sq mi (0.00 km^{2})
- Elevation: 538 ft (164 m)

Population (2020)
  - Total: 238
  - Density: 207.2/sq mi (80.01/km^{2})
- Time zone: UTC-6 (CST)
  - Summer (DST): UTC-5 (CDT)
- ZIP code: 62877
- Area code: 618
- FIPS code: 17-63719
- GNIS ID: 2399069

Richview is a village in Washington County, Illinois, United States. As of the 2020 census, Richview had a population of 238.

== History ==
Richview was originally called "Richmond", and under the latter name was platted in 1839. The present name was adopted in 1852 because of the elevated site of the old town, which afforded a fine view of the surrounding area.

Richview was first formed in 1839. It gradually grew into a business center. It had five stores, two blacksmiths, one wagon shop, 3 physicians, and had a population around 600 people. It had also turned into a railroad town. It was one of 4 towns along the Illinois Central Railway. Eventually two towns would form, Old and New Richview, and together they had a population of around 1000. The two towns did congeal into one. Today Richview is a small village with only a population of about 250.

The town is also the home of the Richview Car and Bike show which is held every July.

== Geography ==
According to the 2010 census, Richview has a total area of 1.12 square miles (2.90 km^{2}), all land.

== Demographics ==
Historical population
Census	Pop.	Note	%±
1860	645		—
1870	1,080		67.4%
1880	559		−48.2%
1890	465		−16.8%
1900	444		−4.5%
1910	366		−17.6%
1920	330		−9.8%
1930	308		−6.7%
1940	344		11.7%
1950	352		2.3%
1960	255		−27.6%
1970	306		20.0%
1980	299		−2.3%
1990	307		2.7%
2000	308		0.3%
2010	253		−17.9%
2020	238		−5.9%
U.S. Decennial Census

As of the census of 2000, there were 308 people, 115 households, and 83 families residing in the village. The population density was 276.9 inhabitants per square mile (106.9/km^{2}). There were 124 housing units at an average density of 111.5 per square mile (43.1/km^{2}). The racial makeup of the village was 97.08% White, 0.65% African American, 0.32% Native American, 0.65% Asian, and 1.30% from two or more races. Hispanic or Latino of any race were 1.95% of the population.

There were 115 households, out of which 34.8% had children under the age of 18 living with them, 56.5% were married couples living together, 11.3% had a female householder with no husband present, and 27.0% were non-families. 20.9% of all households were made up of individuals, and 8.7% had someone living alone who was 65 years of age or older. The average household size was 2.68 and the average family size was 3.10.

In the village, the population was spread out, with 26.9% under the age of 18, 10.4% from 18 to 24, 26.9% from 25 to 44, 24.7% from 45 to 64, and 11.0% who were 65 years of age or older. The median age was 34 years. For every 100 females, there were 104.0 males. For every 100 females age 18 and over, there were 97.4 males.

The median income for a household in the village was $38,125, and the median income for a family was $39,000. Males had a median income of $30,875 versus $23,125 for females. The per capita income for the village was $15,546. About 4.9% of families and 8.8% of the population were below the poverty line, including 11.4% of those under the age of eighteen and 6.3% of those 65 or over.

== Notable people ==
- Zola Cooper (1904–1954), cancer researcher, born in Richview
