= Zola Cooper =

American medical researcher

- Born: Zola Katharine Cooper; September 10, 1904; Richview, Illinois
- Died: October 23, 1954 (aged 50); St. Louis, Missouri
- Occupations: Dermatologist, medical school professor
- Years active: 1930s-1950s

Zola Katharine Cooper (September 10, 1904 – October 23, 1954) was an American dermatologist, cancer researcher, and medical school professor, based in St. Louis, Missouri.

== Early life ==
Zola Cooper was born in Richview, Illinois, the daughter of William P. Cooper Jr. and Rose Elliott. She graduated from Washington University in St. Louis (WashU) in 1925, and continued at the same school for her master's degree in 1926, and her Ph.D. in 1929.

== Career ==
Cooper was a dermatologist, cancer researcher and pathologist at the Barnard Free Skin and Cancer Hospital. She studied the structural changes of skin exposed to radiation, and the effect of hormones on hair growth and distribution. In 1940, she joined the faculty at her alma mater's School of Medicine to teach pathology courses. From 1947 to 1949, while her mother was living in Oklahoma City, she was an assistant professor of histology at the University of Oklahoma's medical school. In 1949 she was made an assistant professor of pathology at WashU. She also spoke to community groups about cancer and other topics.

Her research was published in Archives of Dermatology, The American Journal of Anatomy, The American Journal of Cancer, Journal of the National Cancer Institute, Cancer Research, and Experimental Biology and Medicine. She contributed a chapter on skin for the textbook Cowdry's Problems of Ageing (1952).

== Personal life and legacy ==
Cooper died suddenly from a cerebral hemorrhage in 1954, aged 50 years, at her home in St. Louis. The annual Zola Cooper Seminar is named in her memory, and promotes learning in clinical dermatology and dermatopathology.
