= List of storms named Zeta =

The name Zeta has been used for two tropical cyclones in the Atlantic Ocean.

- Tropical Storm Zeta (2005), post-season storm that formed on December 30, and continued into January 2006
- Hurricane Zeta (2020), Category 3 hurricane that made landfall in Mexico's Yucatán Peninsula and then in the U.S. state of Louisiana, and later brought snow to New England
