= Zola (crater) =

Crater on Mercury

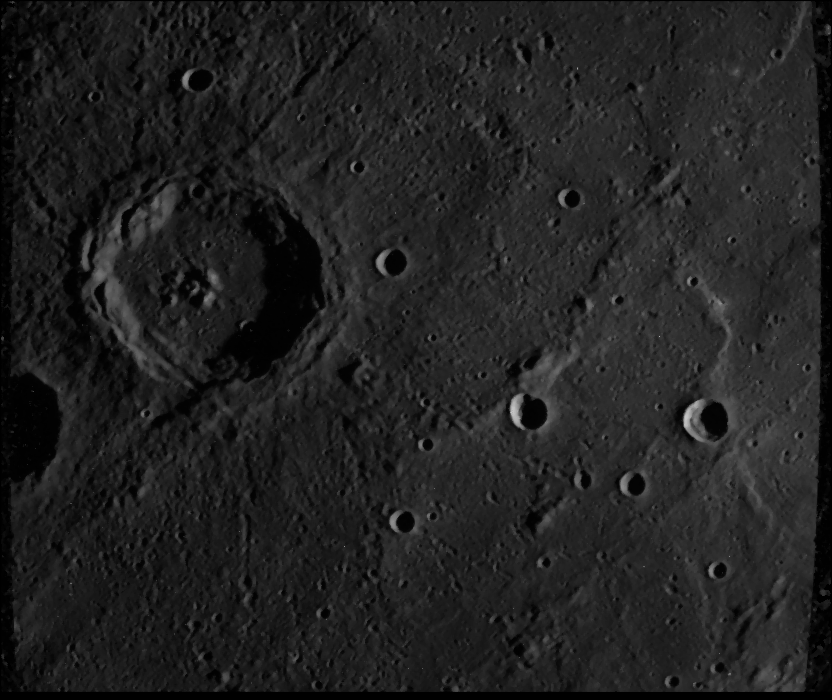
- Mariner 10 image of Zola crater, left of center. Note the complex of peaks within the crater. North is up.
- Feature type: Central-peak impact crater
- Location: Shakespeare quadrangle, Mercury
- Coordinates: 49.75°N 178.25°W
- Diameter: 70 km (43 mi)
- Eponym: Émile Zola

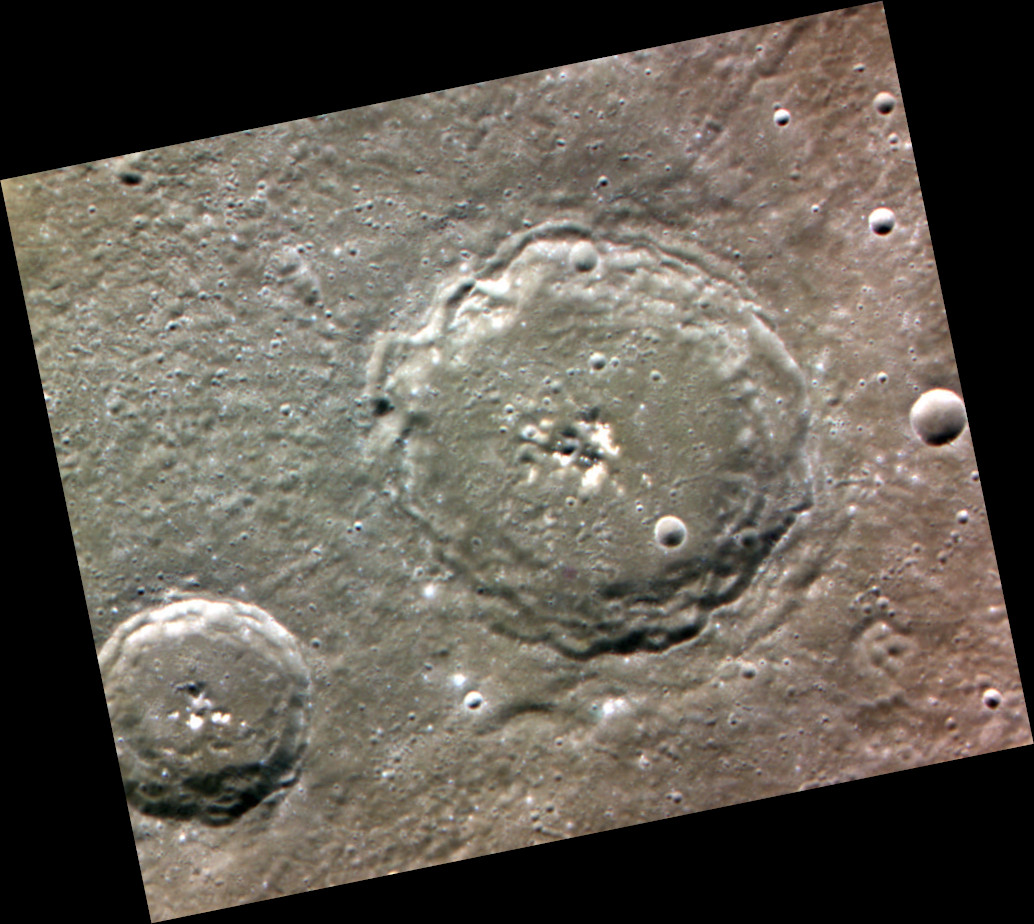
MESSENGER exaggerated color image

Zola is a crater on Mercury, first imaged by Mariner 10 in 1974. The crater was named after the French novelist and playwright Émile Zola by the IAU in 1979.

Bright areas on the central peak complex of Zola may be hollows.

Zola is located to the northeast of the Caloris basin. The crater Nervo is to the south, Brahms is to the north, and Mansur is to the east. The small crater Ailey is to the southwest.
