= List of storms named Zeke =

The name Zeke has been used for three tropical cyclones in the Northern Hemisphere, one in the Eastern Pacific and two in the Western Pacific.

Eastern Pacific:

- Tropical Storm Zeke (1992) – stayed off shore of southwestern Mexican coast

Western Pacific:

- Typhoon Zeke (1991) (T9106, 06W, Etang) – passed over the Philippines before hitting Hainan
- Typhoon Zeke (1994) (T9408, 12W) – stayed well east of Japan
