= 2010–11 South Pacific cyclone season =

Tropical cyclone season

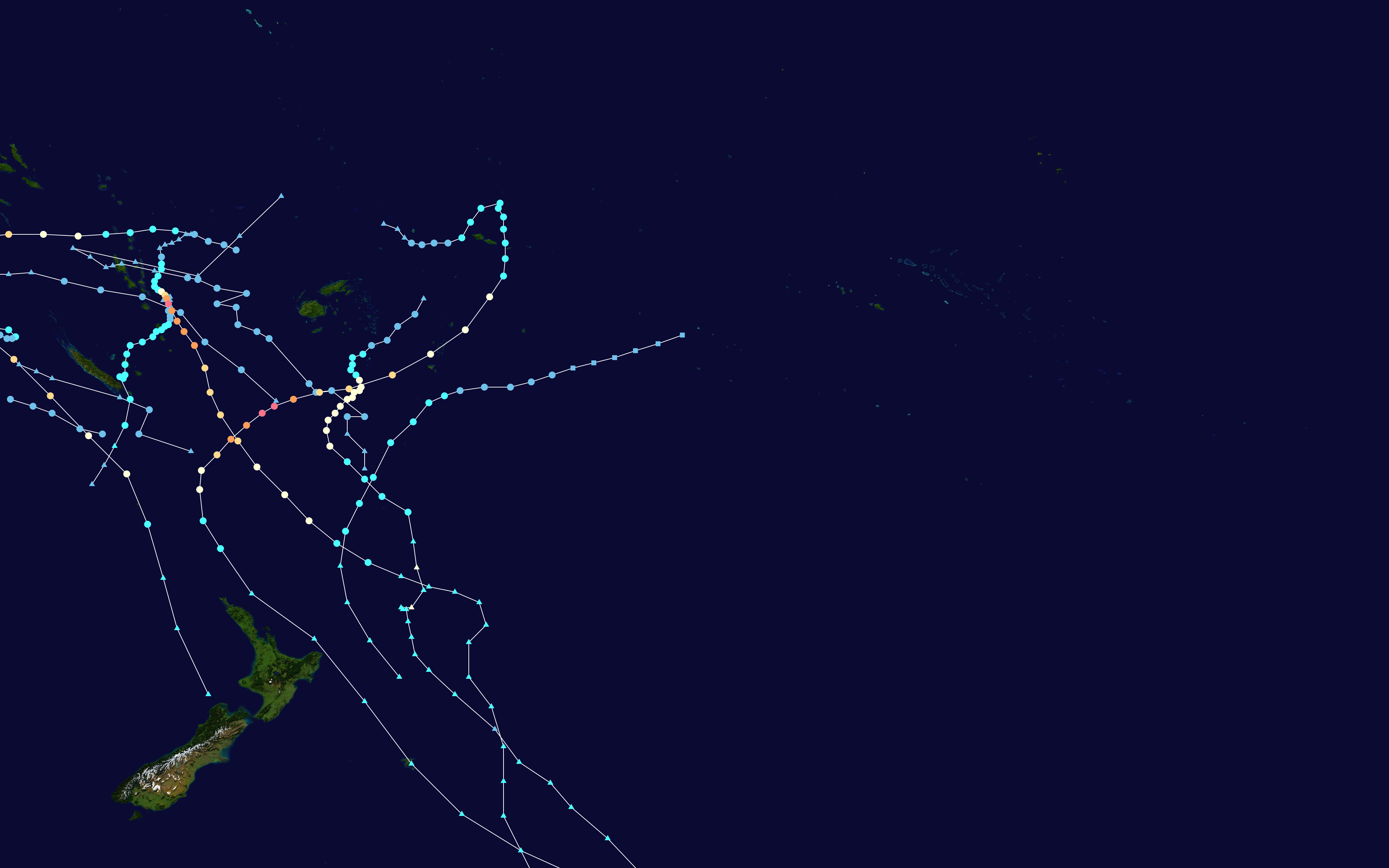
- Season summary map

Seasonal boundaries
- First system formed: November 24, 2010
- Last system dissipated: May 11, 2011

Strongest storm
- Name: Wilma
  - Maximum winds: 185 km/h (115 mph) (10-minute sustained)
  - Lowest pressure: 935 hPa (mbar)

Seasonal statistics
- Total disturbances: 17
- Total depressions: 14
- Tropical cyclones: 7
- Severe tropical cyclones: 5
- Total fatalities: 3 direct, 2 indirect
- Total damage: $25 million (2010 USD)

Related articles
- 2010–11 Australian region cyclone season; 2010–11 South-West Indian Ocean cyclone season

The 2010–11 South Pacific cyclone season was an average tropical cyclone season, with seven tropical cyclones and five severe tropical cyclones developing during the season. The season ran from November 1, 2010, until April 30, 2011, though if any tropical cyclones had developed between July 1, 2010, and June 30, 2011, the official tropical cyclone year, they would have been counted towards the season's total. Within the South Pacific basin tropical cyclones were officially monitored by the Fiji Meteorological Service's Regional Specialized Meteorological Center in Nadi, Fiji, north of 25°S, and to the south the Meteorological Service of New Zealand's Tropical Cyclone Warning Center in Wellington, New Zealand. Any disturbances forming in the region were designated with a sequential number suffixed by the letter F. In addition, the United States Military's Joint Typhoon Warning Center unofficially monitored parts of the basin during the season, where any systems judged to have achieved tropical storm strength or greater received a number suffixed with the letter P. RSMC Nadi and TCWC Wellington both use the Australian Tropical Cyclone Intensity Scale, and measure wind speeds over a period of ten minutes, while the JTWC measures sustained winds over a period of one minute which can be applied to the Saffir–Simpson hurricane scale. Seven named storms formed or moved into the South Pacific basin during the 2010–11 season, the strongest of which was Severe Tropical Cyclone Wilma in late January.

== Seasonal outlooks ==
Source Record	Tropical Cyclone	Severe Tropical Cyclone	Ref
Record high:	1997–98:16	1982–83:10	
Record low:	2003–04: 3	2008–09: 0	
Averages:	8.9	4.3	
NIWA	9–12	3	
RSMC Nadi	7–9	4	
Region	Prediction	Chance of above average	Actual activity
Western	7–8	79%	5
Eastern	5–6	33%	7
Source:BOM's Seasonal Outlooks for Tropical Cyclones.

Ahead of the cyclone season, RSMC Nadi, TCWC Wellington, the Australian Bureau of Meteorology (BoM), the New Zealand National Institute of Water and Atmospheric Research (NIWA) and various other Pacific Meteorological services, all contributed towards the Island Climate Update tropical cyclone outlook that was released during October 2010. The outlook took into account the moderate-strong La Niña conditions that had been observed across the Pacific and analogue seasons that had La Niña conditions occurring during the season. The outlook called for a normal or above average number of tropical cyclone occurring during the season, with nine to twelve named tropical cyclones, to occur between 135°E and 120°W compared to an average of nine. At least three of the tropical cyclones were expected to become category 3 severe tropical cyclones, while one was expected to become a category 4 severe tropical cyclone. In addition to contributing towards the Island Climate Update outlook, RSMC Nadi and the BoM issued their own seasonal forecasts for the South Pacific region. The BoM issued 2 seasonal forecasts for the South Pacific region between 142.5°E – 165°E and one for the Eastern Southern Pacific region between 165°E – 120°W. They noted that the western region had a 79% chance of being above average activity with seven to eight tropical cyclones expected to form, compared to an average of five tropical cyclones. The eastern region had a 33% chance of being above average with five to six tropical cyclones predicted, compared to an average of seven tropical cyclones.

Within their outlook RSMC Nadi predicted that between seven and nine tropical cyclones, would occur within the basin compared to an average of around 8.9 cyclones. They also reported that the tropical cyclone genesis trough was expected to be located within the Coral Sea area near to and to the west of the International Date Line. This was based on the expected and predicted ENSO conditions, and the existence of the Pacific warm pool of sub-surface temperature anomalies in this region. The Island Climate Update outlook assessed the risk of a tropical cyclone affecting a certain island or territory. As the tropical cyclone genesis trough was expected to be located within the Coral Sea area near to and to the west of the International Date Line, normal or slightly above normal activity was expected for island nations within the Coral Sea. It was also predicted that the risk of tropical cyclones affecting island nations located to the east of the International Date Line would be reduced during the season. It was predicted that Papua New Guinea, Vanuatu, New Caledonia, New Zealand and the Solomon Islands had an elevated chance of being affected by a single or multiple tropical cyclones. Fiji and Tonga were predicted to have a near normal chance, while other island nations had a low or reduced chance of being affected by a tropical cyclone.

== Seasonal summary ==
17 tropical disturbances developed during the 2010–11 South Pacific tropical cyclone year, with 14 developing into tropical depressions and 8 becoming tropical and severe tropical cyclones.

== Systems ==
=== Tropical Depression 01F ===
- Tropical depression (Australian scale)
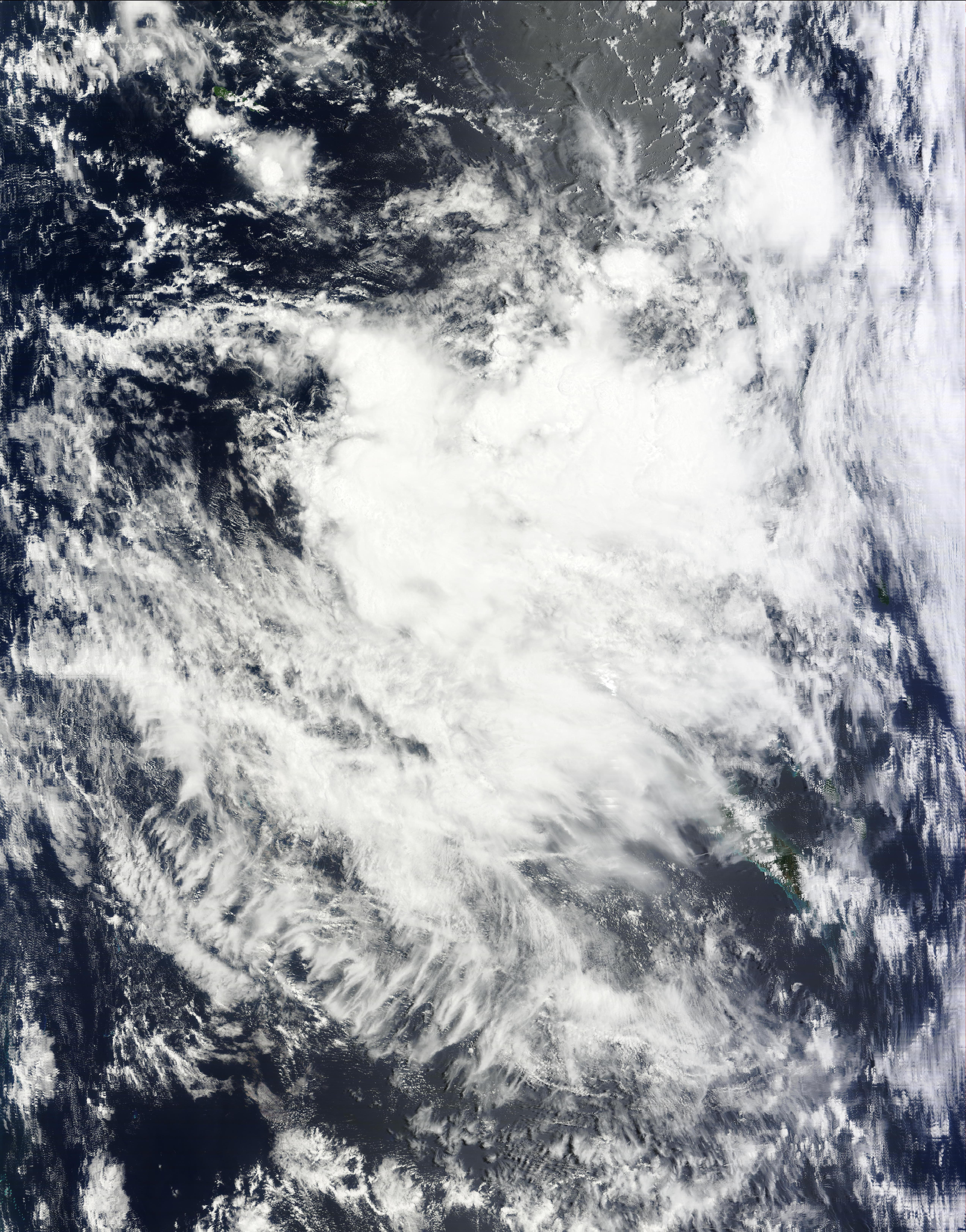
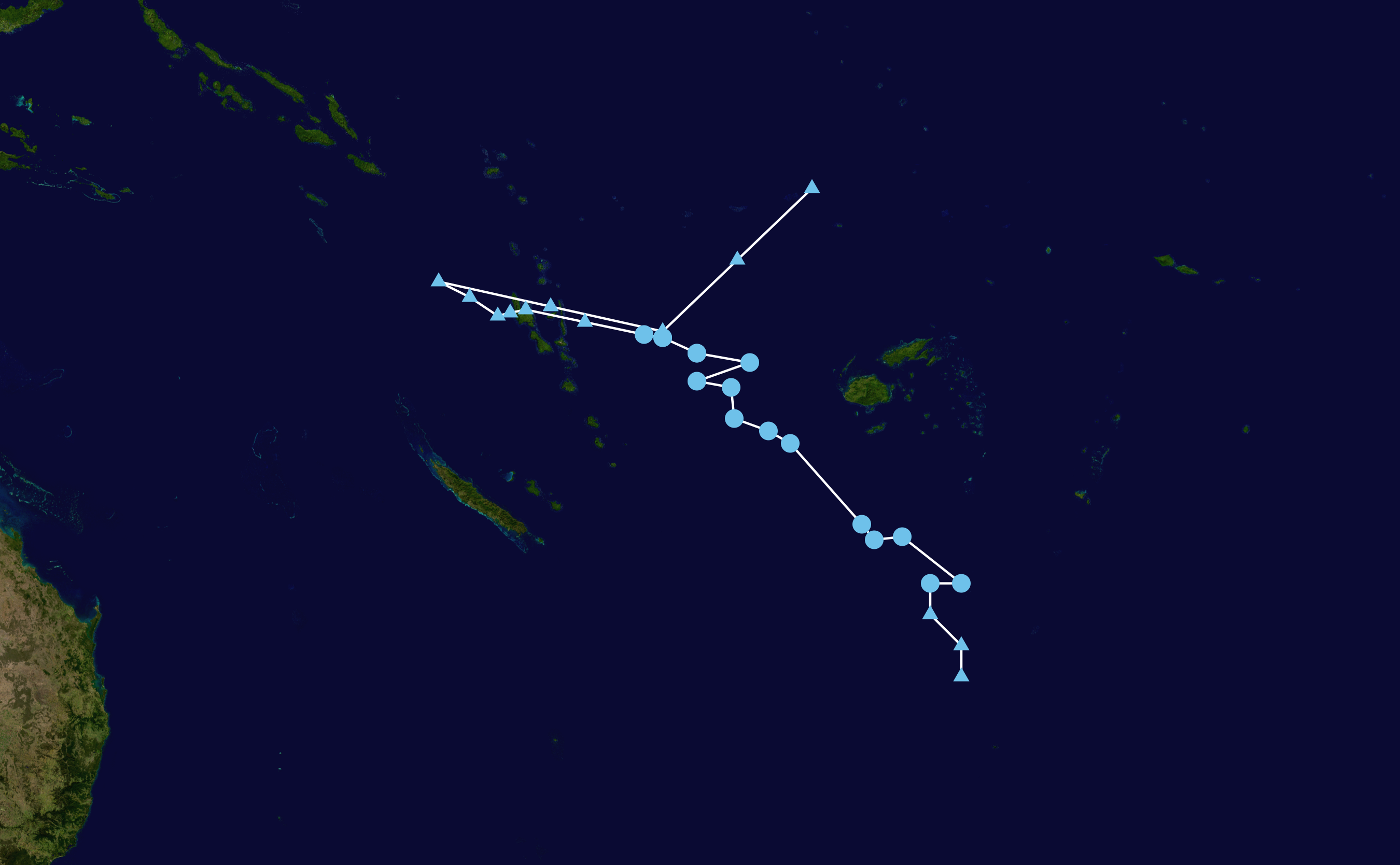
- Duration: November 24 – November 30
- Peak intensity: 65 km/h (40 mph) (10-min); 999 hPa (mbar)

The first tropical cyclone of the season, Tropical Depression 01F, was first identified on November 24 well to the west of Fiji. Little strengthening was anticipated to occur as the system slowly tracked towards the south-southeast. The following day, after an abrupt relocation to the southwest, the disturbance was assigned with the identifier 01F while situated near Vanuatu. Gradually strengthening, the disturbance was upgraded to a tropical depression on November 25 after a slight increase in convection. Situated along the eastern edge of an upper-level trough, the depression tracked towards the east-southeast and would keep this general motion for several days. Though situated over warm waters, estimated to be 30 °C (86 °F), persistent wind shear prevented the system from becoming organized.

The system later relocated into a region less favorable for tropical cyclogenesis on November 27 but continued to strengthen and become better organized. Despite attaining gale-force winds, the depression was not classified as a tropical cyclone as these winds were located roughly 110 km (70 mi) from its center. During the afternoon of November 28, the depression attained a minimum barometric pressure of 999 hPa (mbar; 29.50 inHg). Gradual weakening took place over the following few days as the system tracked southward. By November 30, the depression was declassified as a tropical cyclone and was last noted on December 1 near the International Date Line.

On November 26, a tropical cyclone alert was issued for Fiji as the depression was expected to bring heavy rains and strong winds to the region. Flooding was anticipated in low-lying areas and if further intensification took place, more significant damage would be expected. The alert was later raised to a cyclone warning as the system neared the country. All warnings associated with the depression were discontinued on November 29 as it moved away from Fiji. The system brought gusty winds and heavy rains to the islands of Vatulele and Kadavu, though no damage occurred.

=== Tropical Cyclone Vania ===
- Category 2 tropical cyclone (Australian scale)
- Tropical storm (SSHWS)
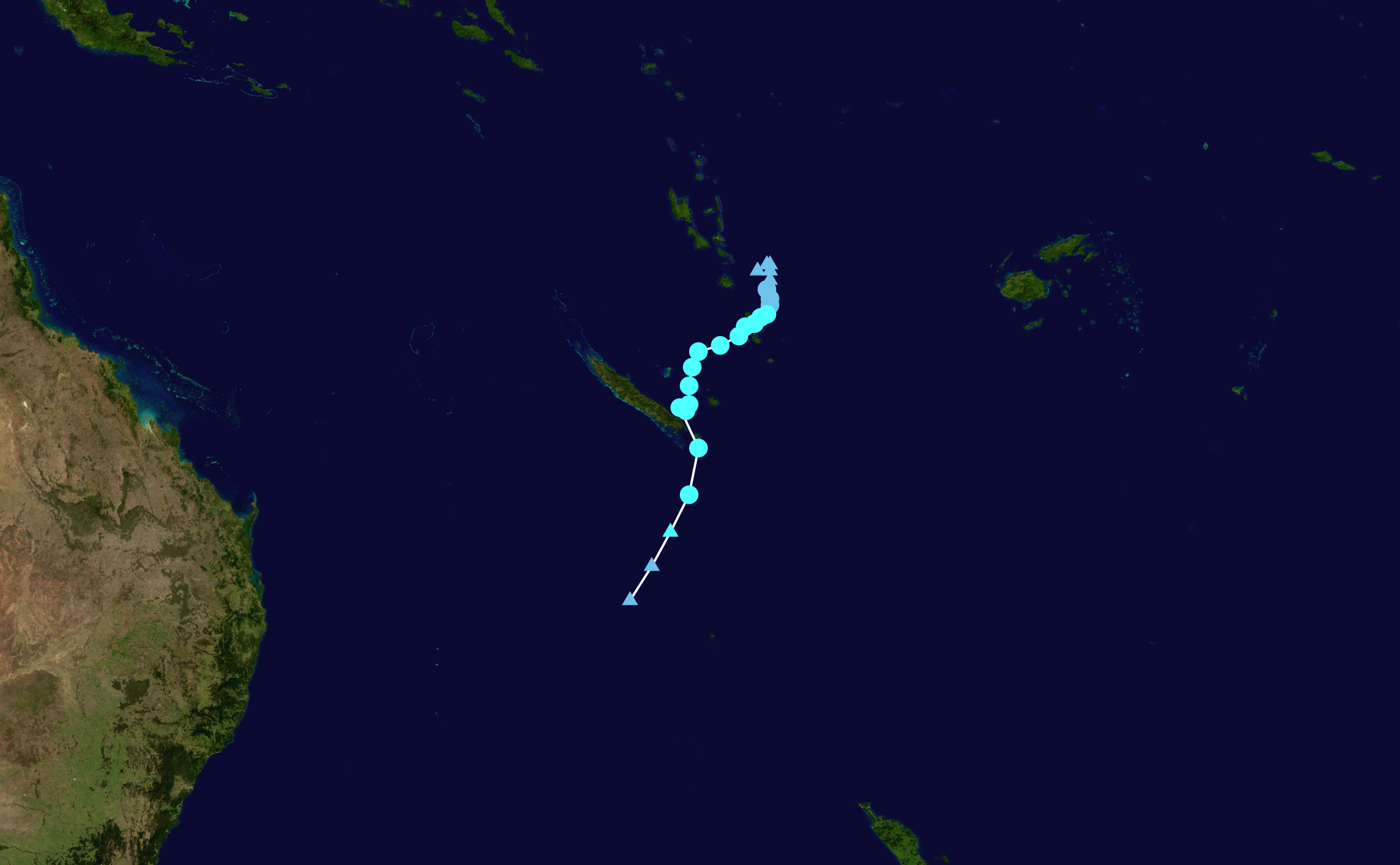
- Duration: January 5 – January 15
- Peak intensity: 100 km/h (65 mph) (10-min); 973 hPa (mbar)

During January 5, RSMC Nadi reported that Tropical Disturbance 03F had developed, about 130 km (80 mi) to the northeast of Nadi, Fiji. Over the next few days the disturbance gradually developed further before RSMC Nadi classified it as a tropical depression early on January 9. On January 11, the Joint Typhoon Warning Center initiated warnings on the system and monitored it as Tropical Cyclone 05P. On the Next day, RSMC Nadi upgraded the depression into a Category 1 tropical cyclone and named it "Vania". Later that day, RSMC Nadi reported that Vania had intensified into a Category 2 tropical cyclone. Early the next day, RSMC Nadi upgraded Vania into a Category 3 severe tropical cyclone. Later that day, RSMC Nadi reported that Vania started weakening and downgraded it into a Category 2 tropical cyclone. Subsequently, it was downgraded to a category 1 tropical cyclone on January 14. On January 15, JTWC issued their final warning on the system. Soon, issuing their final advisory, RSMC Nadi downgraded Vania into a Tropical Depression.

In Fiji, heavy rains associated with the initial disturbance brought significant flooding to many islands. Several roads were temporarily shut down due to rising waters, though no homes were affected. Although the center of Vania continued to move away from Fiji, the storm's outer bands brought continued rainfall to the country. As the storm passed through Vanuatu, winds of 140 km/h affected Tafea Province, and contact with this group of islands was lost. Many buildings were damaged and trees were felled. The National Disaster Management Office of Vanuatu enacted a 156.6 million vatu (US$1.6 million) relief plan for Tafea Province, with the vast majority of funds going to food items. Within 24 hours of the storm's arrival in New Caledonia, a large magnitude 7.0 earthquake struck the Loyalty Islands within the archipelago. Media reported that extreme wind gusts up to 225 km/h (140 mph) were felt in the region. A boy died from heart attack after the dual strike of a tsunami warning from an earthquake and a red cyclone alert. Damage totaled to $11 million (2011 USD).

=== Severe Tropical Cyclone Zelia ===
- Category 4 severe tropical cyclone (Australian scale)
- Category 2 tropical cyclone (SSHWS)
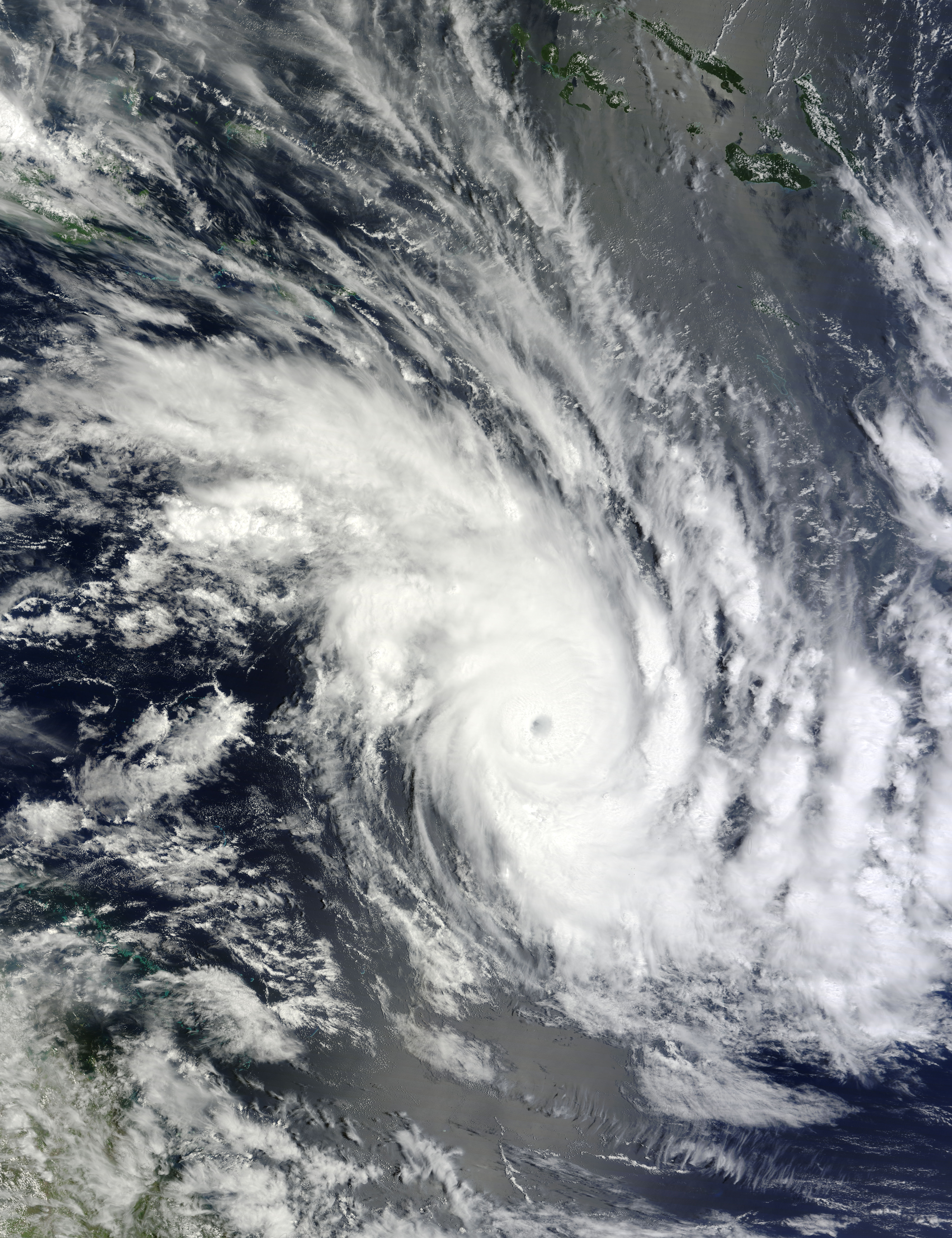
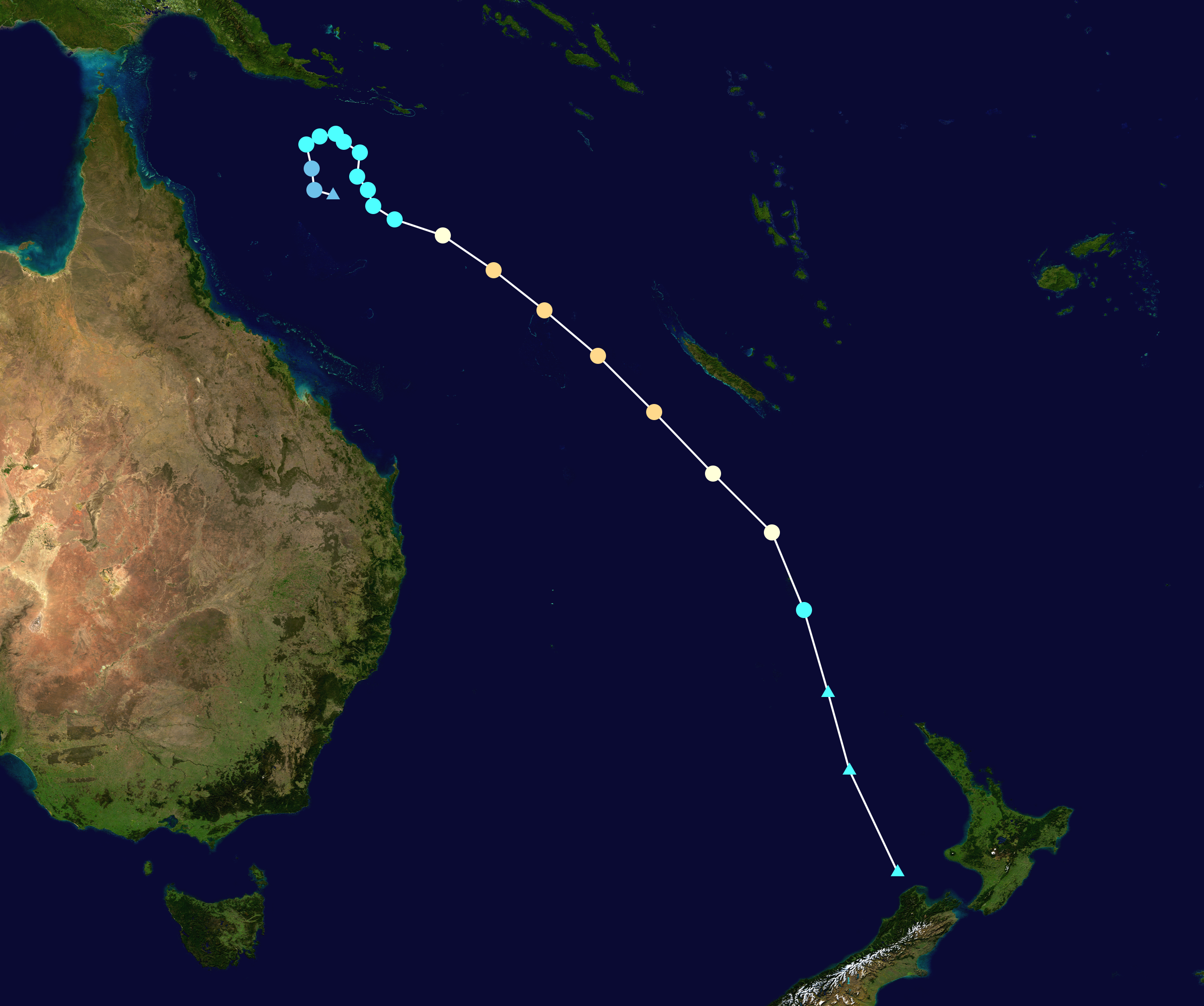
- Duration: January 16 (Entered basin) – January 17
- Peak intensity: 185 km/h (115 mph) (10-min); 957 hPa (mbar)

On January 16, Both the Joint Typhoon Warning Center (JTWC) and Fiji Meteorological Service (RSMC Nadi) reported that Severe Tropical Cyclone Zelia crossed 160°E and entered the South Pacific Ocean as a category three severe tropical cyclone. On the next day, RSMC Nadi downgraded Zelia into a Category two tropical cyclone. As Zelia started weakening and was no longer predicted to affect Fiji, RSMC Nadi issued their final Tropical Disturbance Advisory. Late on January 17, the JTWC reported that Zelia was weakening rapidly and was accelerating towards New Zealand. Zelia was initially predicted to directly impact the Norfolk Island but instead moved away and weakened. The Australian Bureau of Meteorology reported that the island could experience gale-force winds and waves of 7 metres (23 ft). It was also reported that Zelia could bring wind gusts of up to 120 km/h (75 mph) to New Zealand.

According to TVNZ, heavy rain and strong winds were being felt across New Zealand. A mudslide was reported between Hawkes Crag and Fern Arch on State Highway 6 between Westport and Inangahua Junction.

=== Severe Tropical Cyclone Wilma ===
- Category 4 severe tropical cyclone (Australian scale)
- Category 4 tropical cyclone (SSHWS)
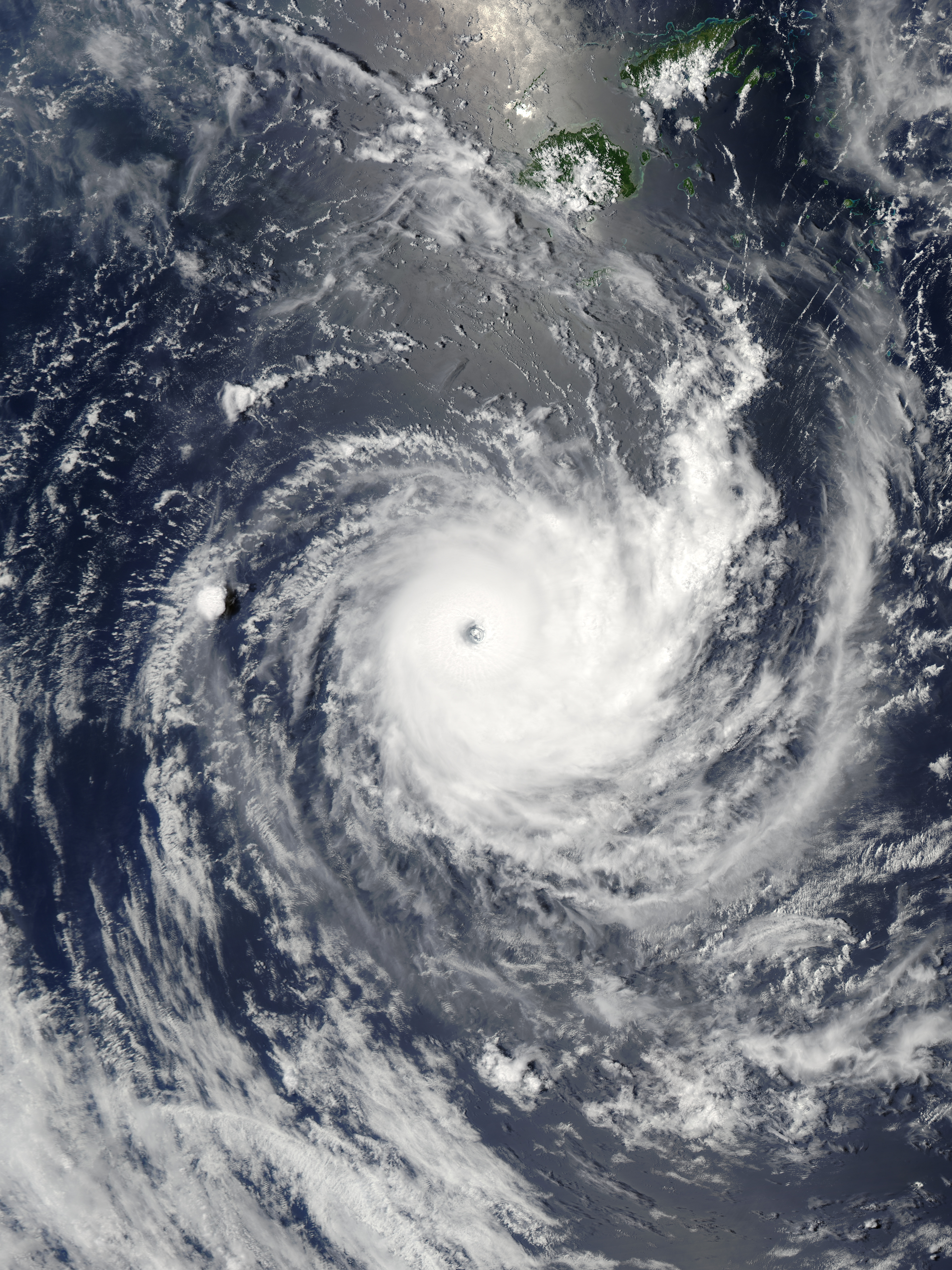
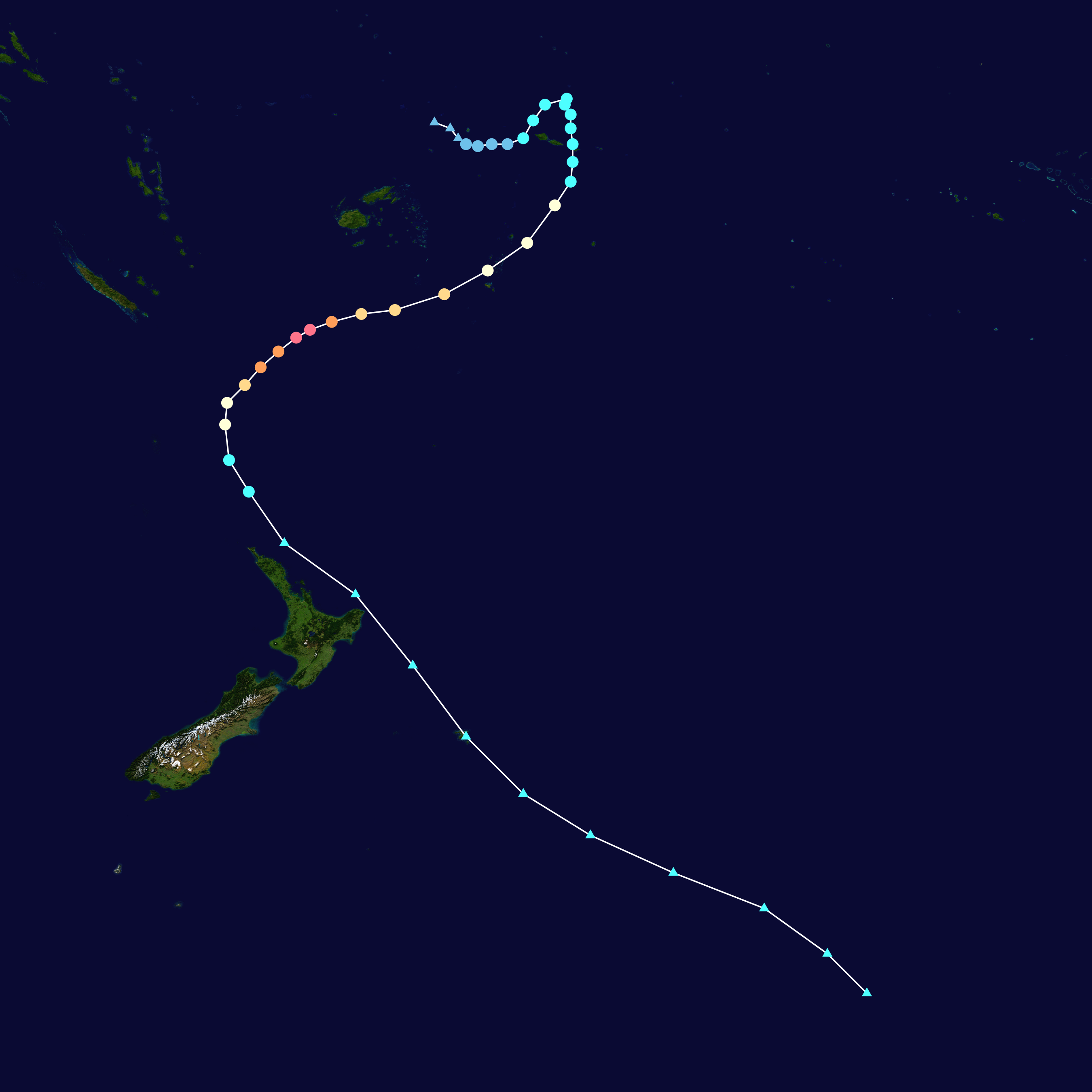
- Duration: January 19 – January 29
- Peak intensity: 185 km/h (115 mph) (10-min); 935 hPa (mbar)

Early on January 19, RSMC Nadi reported that Tropical Disturbance 06F had developed within a trough of low pressure about 665 km (413 mi) to the northeast of Nadi, Fiji. During that day convection surrounding the disturbance gradually became more organized before early the next day, RSMC Nadi reported that it had intensified into a tropical depression. On January 22, The Joint Typhoon Warning Center (JTWC) started monitoring the system as Tropical Cyclone '08P'. Later the same day, RSMC Nadi upgraded Tropical Depression 06F to a tropical cyclone and named it 'Wilma'. Early on January 24, RSMC Nadi further upgraded Wilma to a Category 2 Tropical Cyclone. Late on the same day, RSMC Nadi reported that Wilma had intensified into a Category 3 Severe Tropical Cyclone. Wilma Continued to strengthen and January 26, the RSMC Nadi upgraded it into a Category 4 Severe Tropical Cyclone. Early on January 27, Wilma entered TCWC Wellington's area of responsibility. A few hours later, TCWC Wellington took full responsibility of Wilma, and downgraded it into a Category 3 Severe Tropical Cyclone. Wilma Continued to weaken and TCWC Wellington further downgraded it into a tropical cyclone. On January 28, the JTWC, issuing their final warning, reported that the system took a southeast curve along the coast of North Island, New Zealand and started becoming extratropical. A few hours later, the TCWC Wellington, downgraded it into a low, no longer considering it tropical.

In American Samoa, high winds damaged roofs, downed trees and knocked out power. Heavy rains also triggered a few landslides but overall damage was light. With that, the Pago Pago International Airport was closed and the American Samoa Governor, Togiola Tulafono ordered local government agencies to help those in need. After Wilma moved over American Samoa, a tropical cyclone alert was issued in Tonga and Lau Islands. On the morning of January 25, Wilma blew over Tonga as a severe tropical cyclone. Major damage was reported in the Ha'apai Islands of Tonga. Wilma also disrupted New Zealand Foreign Minister, Murray McCully's trip to Tonga.

=== Tropical Depression 07F ===
- Tropical depression (Australian scale)
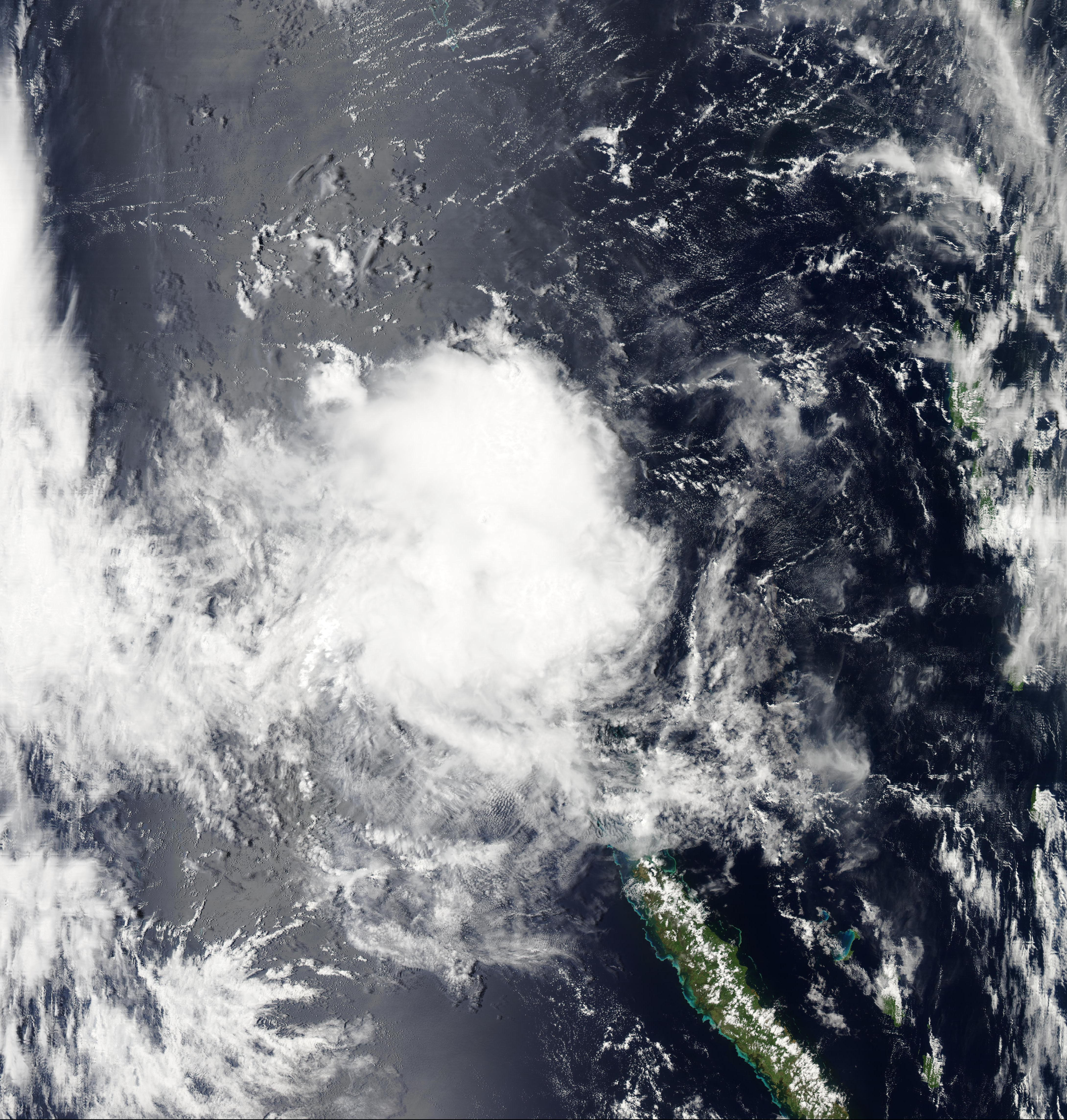
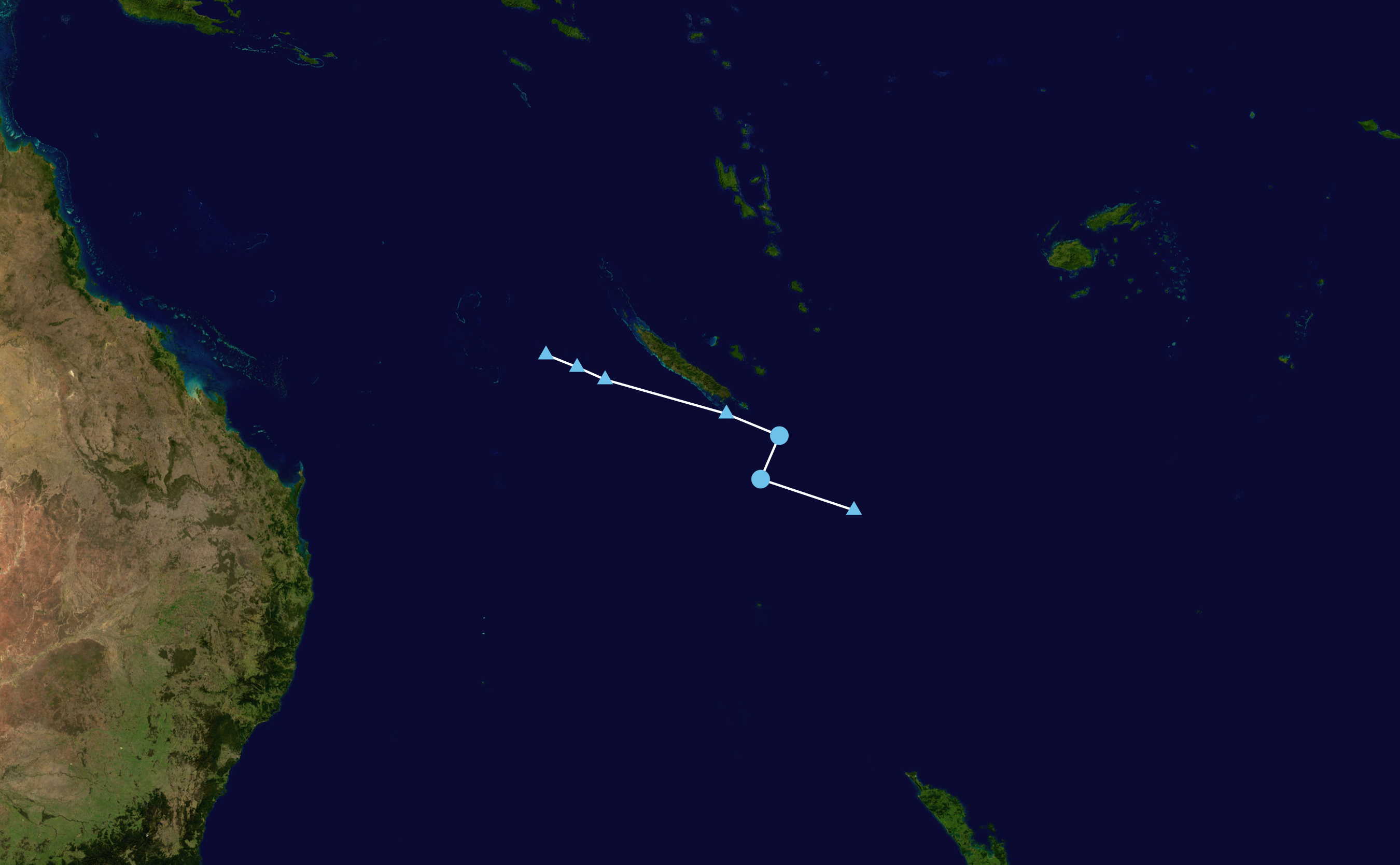
- Duration: January 20 – January 22
- Peak intensity: 65 km/h (40 mph) (10-min); 996 hPa (mbar)

Late on January 21, RSMC Nadi reported that Tropical Disturbance 07F had developed about 570 km (350 mi) to the northwest of Nouméa, in New Caledonia. During the next day the disturbance gradually organized further, with RSMC Nadi reporting that it had developed into a tropical depression later that day. Early on January 22, RSMC Nadi released their final advisory on the tropical depression as it passed into TCWC Wellington's area of responsibility. Within hours of falling under their responsibility, Wellington declared the system as a low, no longer considering it tropical.

=== Tropical Depression Anthony ===
- Tropical depression (Australian scale)
- Tropical storm (SSHWS)
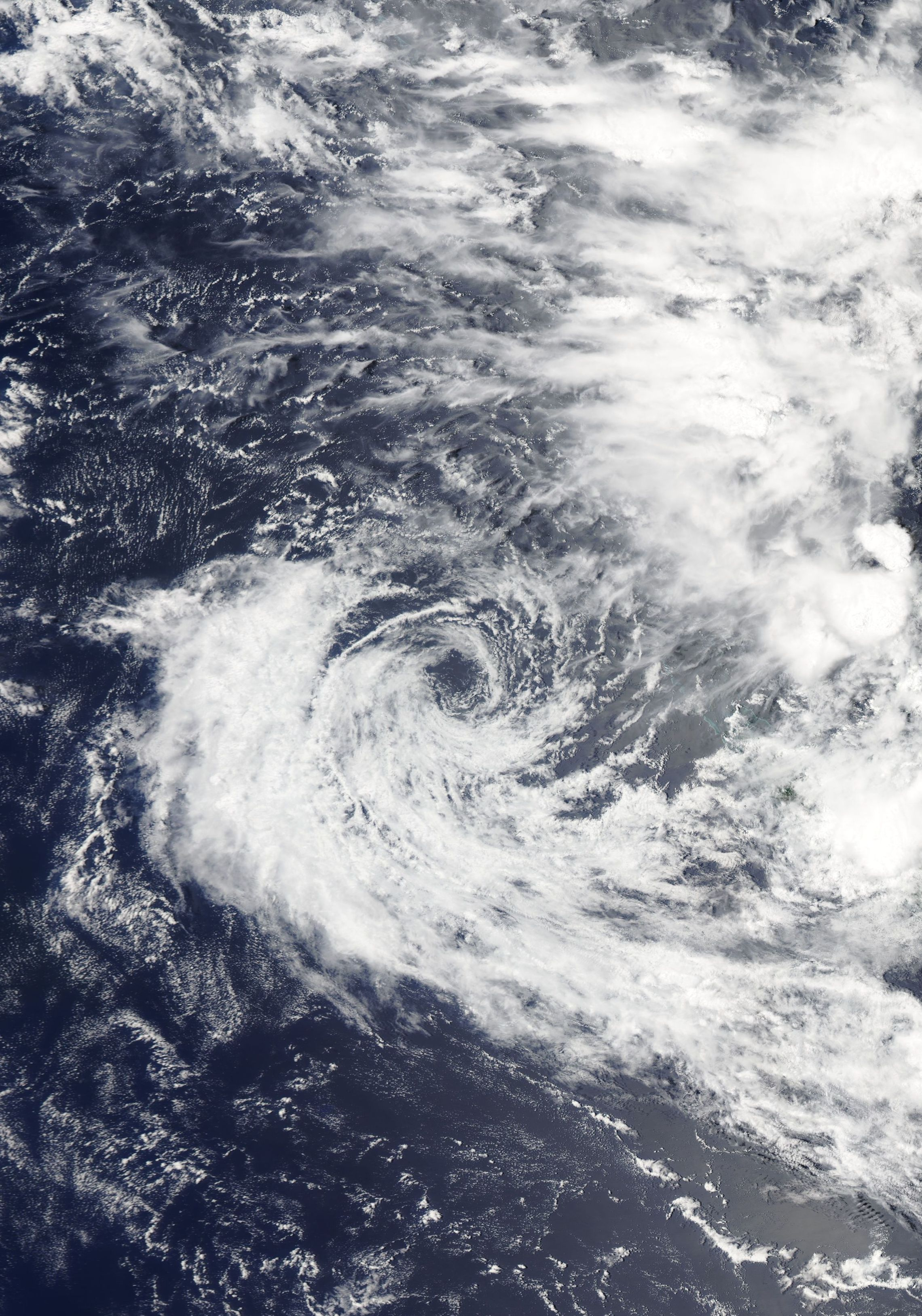
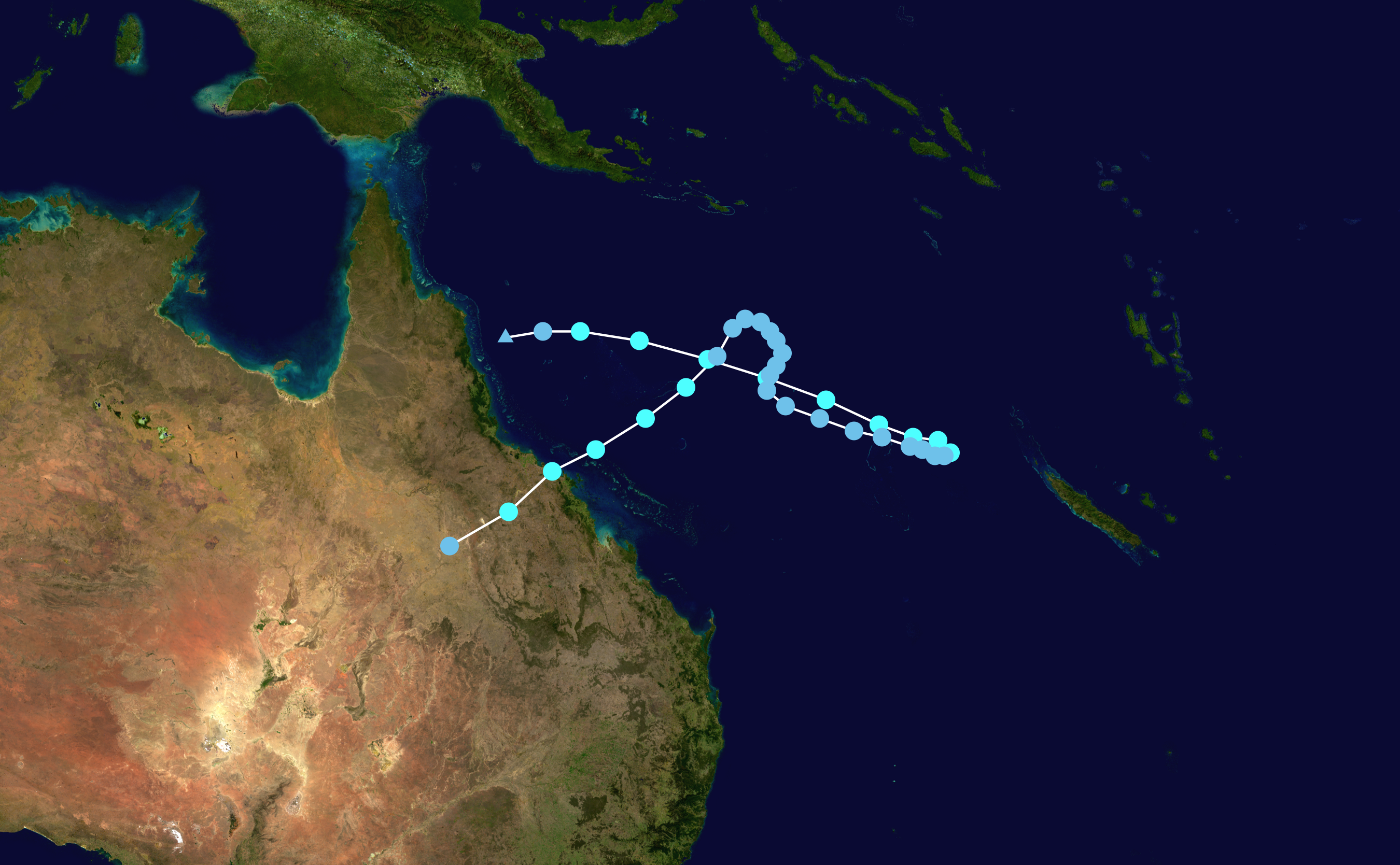
- Duration: January 24 (Entered basin) – January 25 (Out of basin on January 25)
- Peak intensity: 45 km/h (30 mph) (10-min); 998 hPa (mbar)

Late on January 24, RSMC Nadi and TCWC Brisbane reported that Tropical Cyclone Anthony, had moved into the basin from the Australian region as a category 1 tropical cyclone. The system subsequently weakened into a tropical depression during the next day, however, during its post analysis of the system, TCWC Brisbane reported that Anthony had weakened into a tropical low, before moving into the basin during January 24. During January 25, Anthony moved towards the west-northwest and moved out of the South Pacific basin, as a ridge of high pressure developed to the southeast of the system.

=== Severe Tropical Cyclone Yasi ===
- Category 3 severe tropical cyclone (Australian scale)
- Category 2 tropical cyclone (SSHWS)
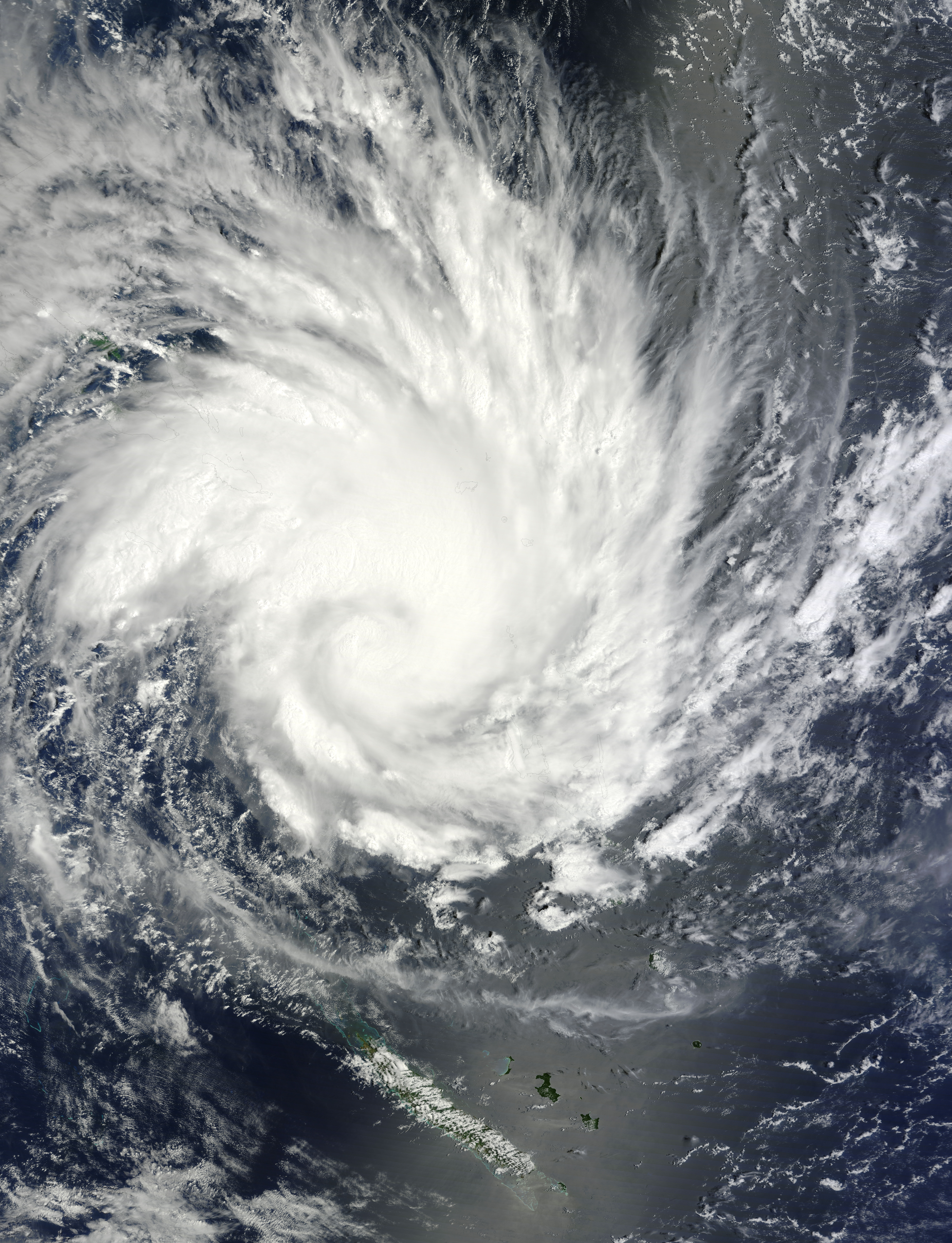
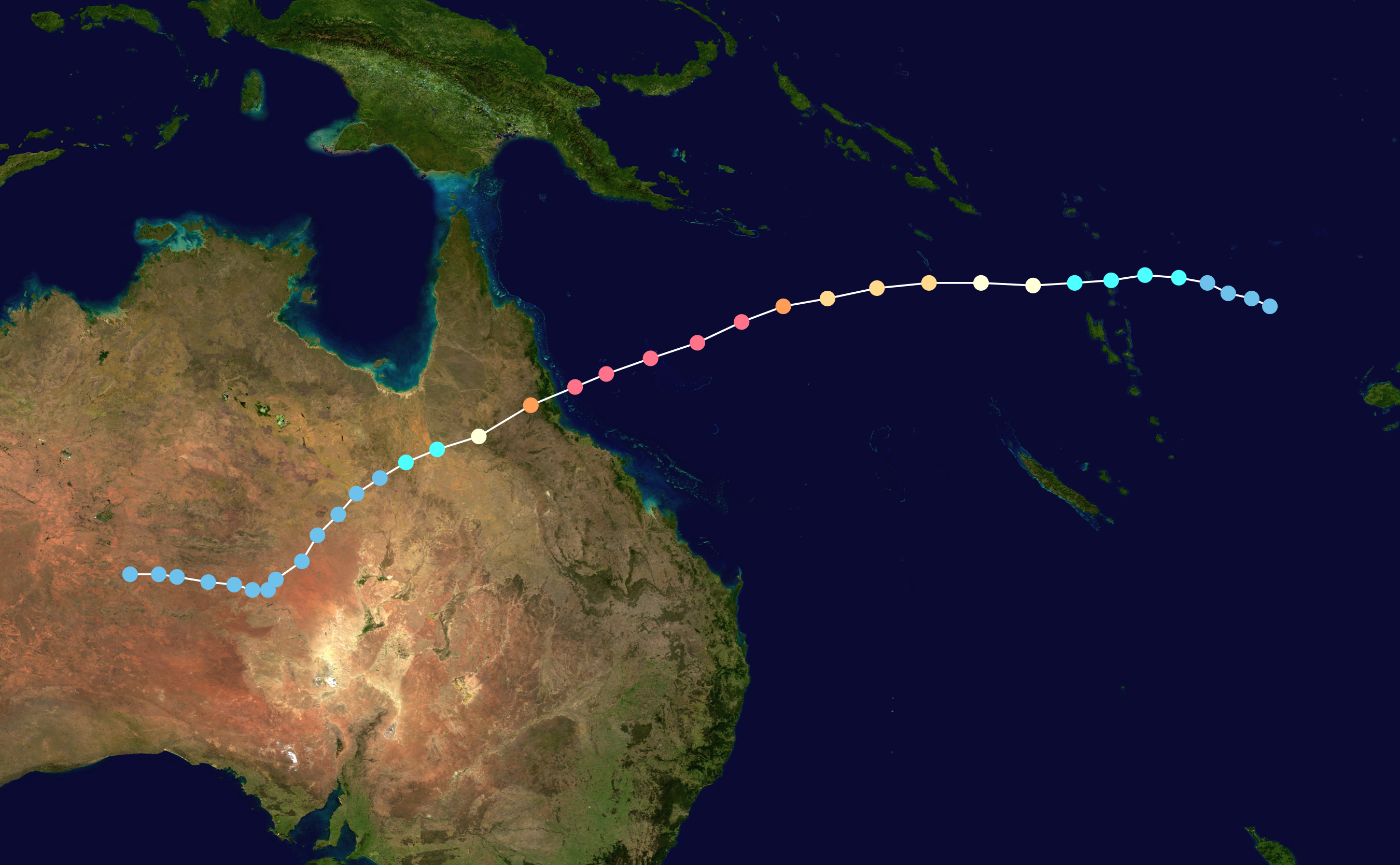
- Duration: January 26 – January 31 (Exited basin)
- Peak intensity: 150 km/h (90 mph) (10-min); 957 hPa (mbar)

Early on January 26, RSMC Nadi reported that Tropical Disturbance 09F, had developed within a surface trough, about 830 km (520 mi), to the northeast of Nadi, Fiji. During that day, the disturbance gradually organized further, before RSMC Nadi reported early the next day, that it had developed into a tropical depression. Over the next couple of days, the depression drifted towards the west, while gradually intensifying and organizing further. Late on January 29, the JTWC issued a Tropical Cyclone Formation Alert on the developing tropical depression, before designating it as 11P and initiating advisories on the system. Early the next day, RSMC Nadi reported that the depression had intensified into a category one tropical cyclone and named it Yasi, while it was located about 510 km (320 mi) to the northeast of Port Vila in Vanuatu. Yasi continued to intensify throughout that day, while affecting the Solomon Islands and Vanuatu. Early on January 31, RSMC Nadi reported that Yasi had intensified into a category two tropical cyclone, before reporting that it had become a severe tropical cyclone. During that afternoon, both the JTWC and RSMC Nadi reported that the system had moved across 160°E and had moved out of the South Pacific Basin and into the Australian region, where it became a much stronger storm before striking Queensland during the first days of February.

=== Tropical Cyclone Zaka ===
- Category 2 tropical cyclone (Australian scale)
- Tropical storm (SSHWS)
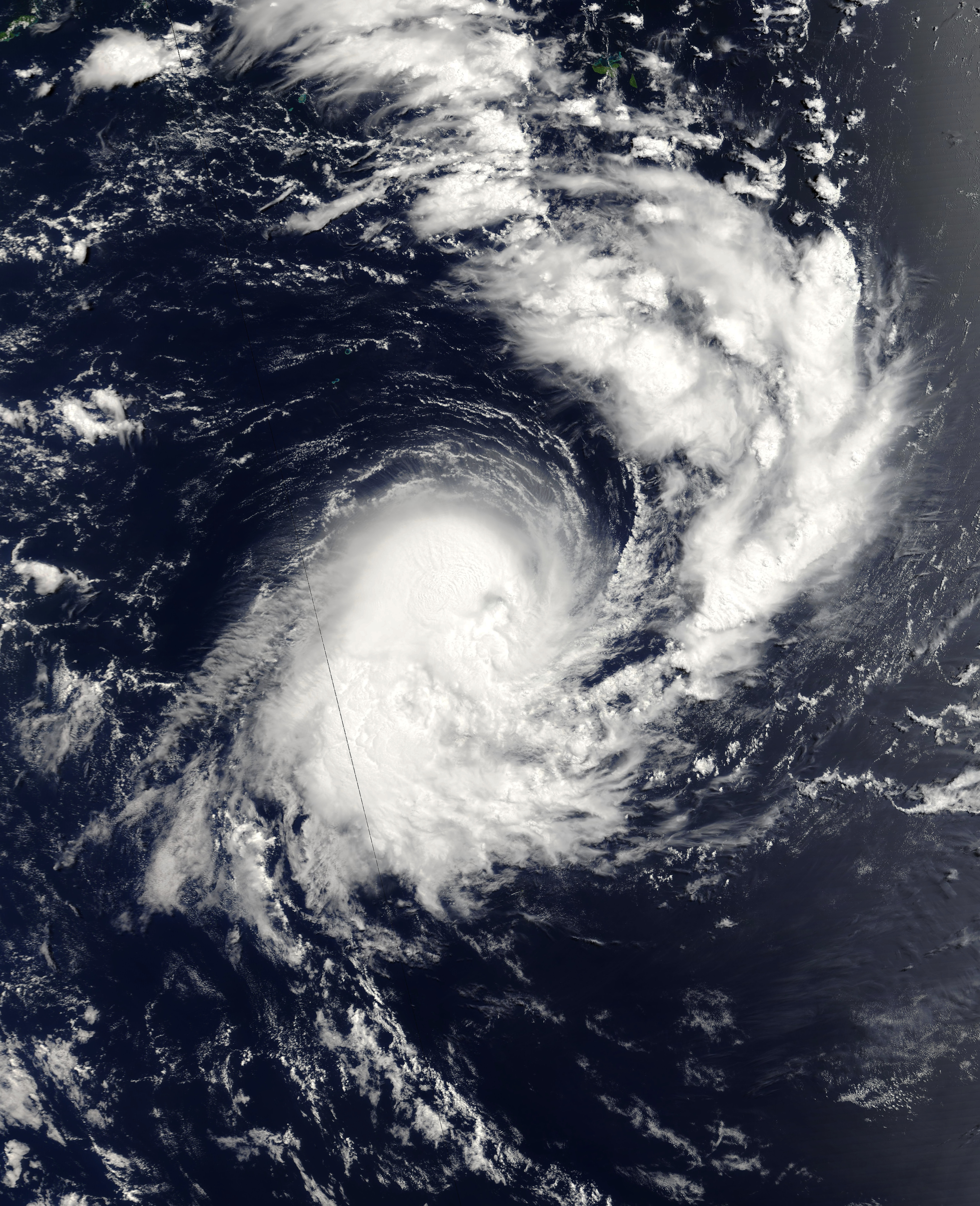
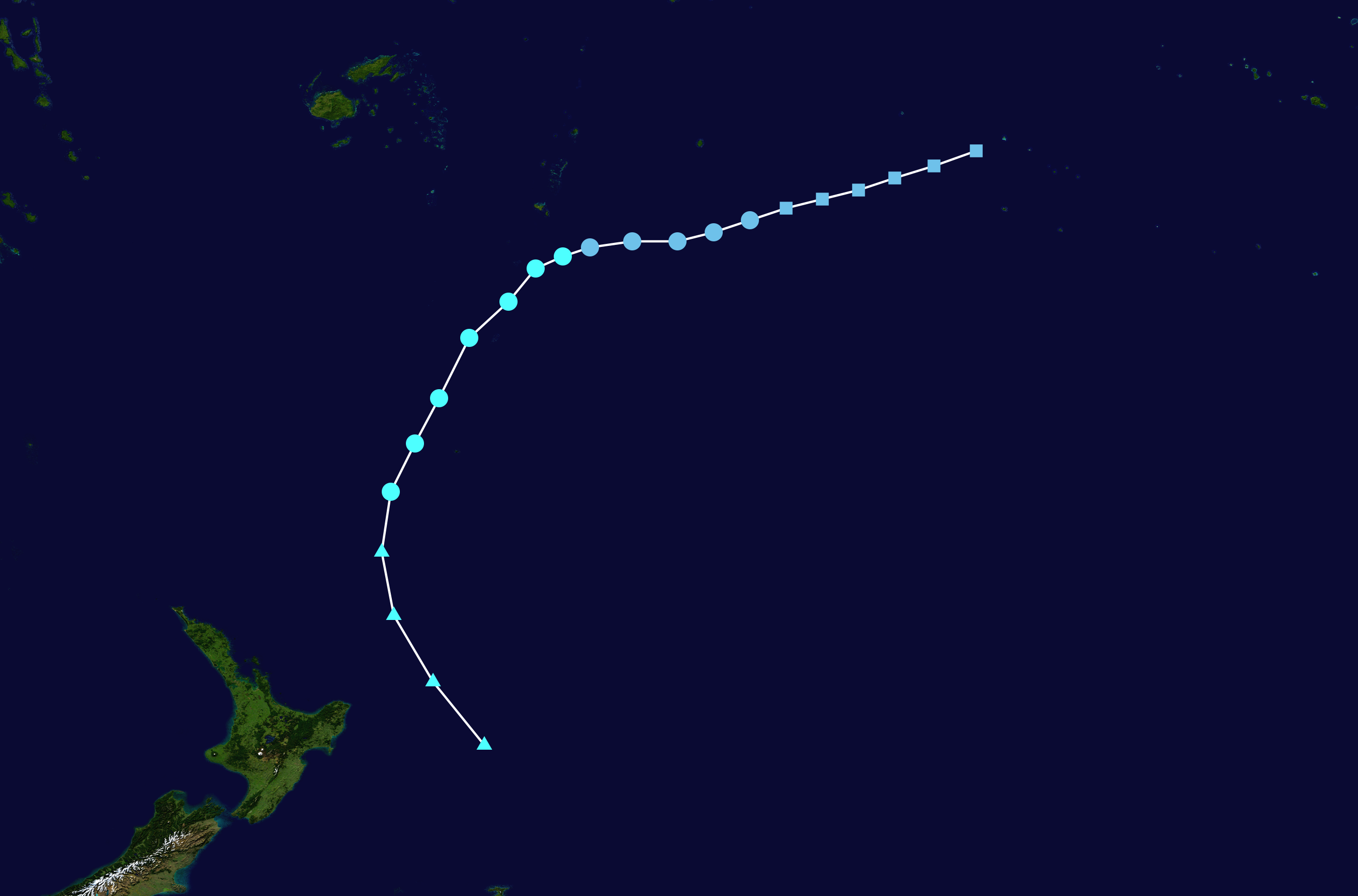
- Duration: February 5 – February 7
- Peak intensity: 95 km/h (60 mph) (10-min); 985 hPa (mbar)

Early on February 5, RSMC Nadi reported that Tropical Disturbance 10F, had developed about 200 km (125 mi), to the south east of Nukualofa in Tonga. During that day, the disturbance gradually organized further whilst moving towards the east. RSMC Nadi, then classified the disturbance as a tropical depression, later that day. Intensification continued and on the next day, RSMC Nadi upgraded Tropical Depression 10F into a Tropical Cyclone and named it 'Zaka'. Soon, Zaka crossed 25°S and TCWC Wellington took full responsibility of the Cyclone. Hours later, the JTWC initiated advisories on the system and designated it with '12P'. At midnight, that day, TCWC Wellington further upgraded Zaka into a Category 2 Tropical Cyclone. Early on the next day, the system started weakening and became a Category 1 Tropical Cyclone. Hours later, TCWC Wellington downgraded Zaka, into a low, no longer considering it tropical. Late on that day, the JTWC, reporting that the system weakened rapidly, issued their final warning on the system.

Weather warnings were issued to the Raoul Island as the system intensified and could bring a significant amount of rain. Zaka was initially expected to move in a southernly path and impact New Zealand. However, the system rapidly weakened and passed several miles east of the islands.

=== Severe Tropical Cyclone Atu ===
- Category 4 severe tropical cyclone (Australian scale)
- Category 4 tropical cyclone (SSHWS)
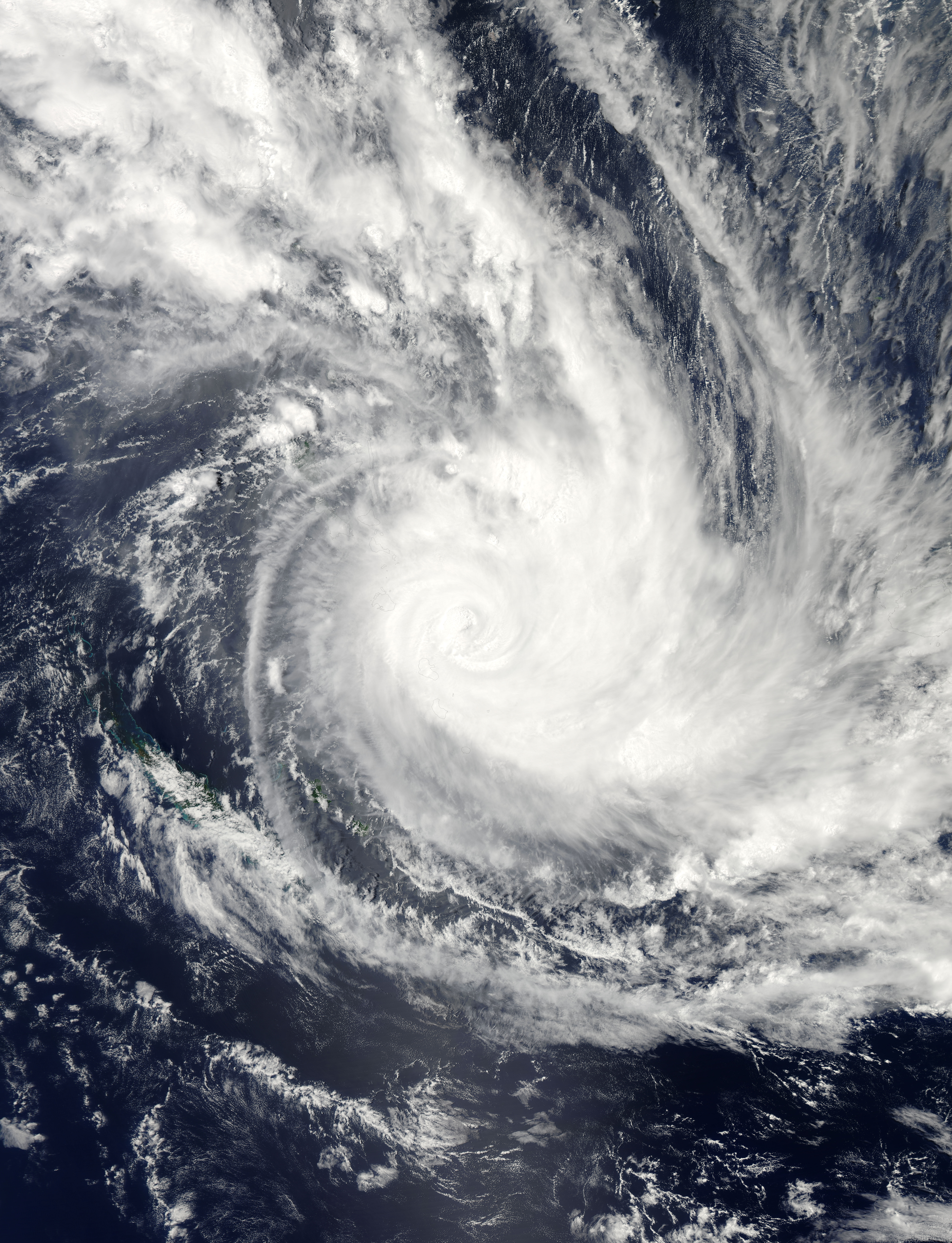
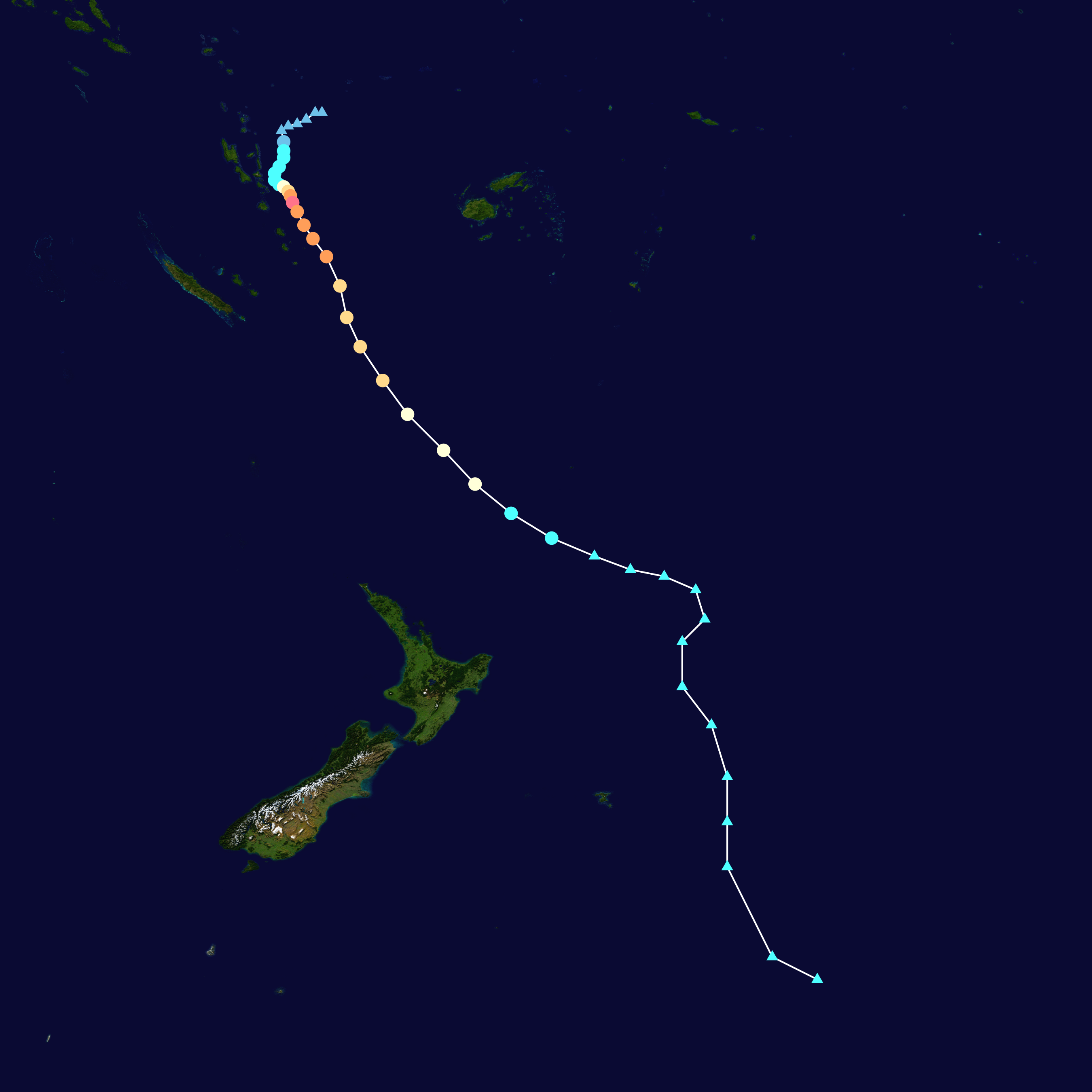
- Duration: February 13 – February 24
- Peak intensity: 165 km/h (105 mph) (10-min); 940 hPa (mbar)

Early on February 13, RSMC Nadi reported that Tropical Disturbance 11F had formed about 65 km to the southwest of Port Vila in Vanuatu. During the next day, the system gradually moved north and started intensifying. Late on February 16, the disturbance turned south-southeast and intensified into a Tropical depression. On the next morning, organization in the system improved, but the convection decreased unexpectedly. Early on January 18, deep convection started developing over the Low-level Circulation Center (LLCC) which is very favorable for Tropical cyclogenesis. Late on that day, the JTWC started monitoring the system as Tropical Cyclone 17P. Early on the next day, RSMC Nadi upgraded the depression into a Category 1 Tropical Cyclone and named it Atu. At midnight, that day, RSMC Nadi upgraded Atu into a Category 2 tropical cyclone, and six hours later it was upgraded again into a Category 3 severe tropical cyclone, and then again into a Category 4 Severe Tropical cyclone. Though Atu strengthened rapidly, it weakened unexpectedly on the next day because of an eyewall replacement cycle. Early on February 23, Atu crossed 25°S and entered TCWC Wellington's area of responsibility as a Category 3 Severe Tropical Cyclone. Late on that day, the JTWC, reporting that the system was becoming extratropical, issued their final warning on Atu. At midnight, that day, TCWC Wellington reported that Atu was no longer a Severe Tropical Cyclone. Within six hours, TCWC Wellington downgraded Atu into a low, no longer considering it tropical.

Relief operations across Vanuatu related to Cyclone Vania were temporarily halted due to dangerous conditions produced by Atu. All seagoing vessels stopped operations and many flights were canceled during the duration of its passage. On Efate, 400 people sought refuge in public shelters. Between February 20 and 22, Cyclone Atu brought heavy rains and damaging winds to portions of Tafea Province. Still recovering from Cyclone Vania the previous month, Atu damaged or destroyed the remaining crops left in the province. Agriculture damage on Tanna was reported to be devastating. Fruit on all banana and coconut trees were blown off. Communications with the islands of Aniwa and Futuna were lost during the cyclone. Contact was re-established three days after the storms passage. Minor damage took place on Efate, with some downed trees and debris strewn about.

The MV Nakato provided 240 tonnes of rice for residents in Tanna on February 25 while the MV Makila was used to bring rice to residents on Aniwa, Aneityum, Erromango, and Futuna. The Government of France later conducted areal surveys of the affected areas. A month after Atu's passage, residents in eastern Tanna reported that they had received no aid from the government despite shipments reaching less affected areas. The National Disaster Management Office later admitted that they did not have enough rice to distribute to all affected areas and received misinformation from survey teams.

=== Severe Tropical Cyclone Bune ===
- Category 3 severe tropical cyclone (Australian scale)
- Category 1 tropical cyclone (SSHWS)
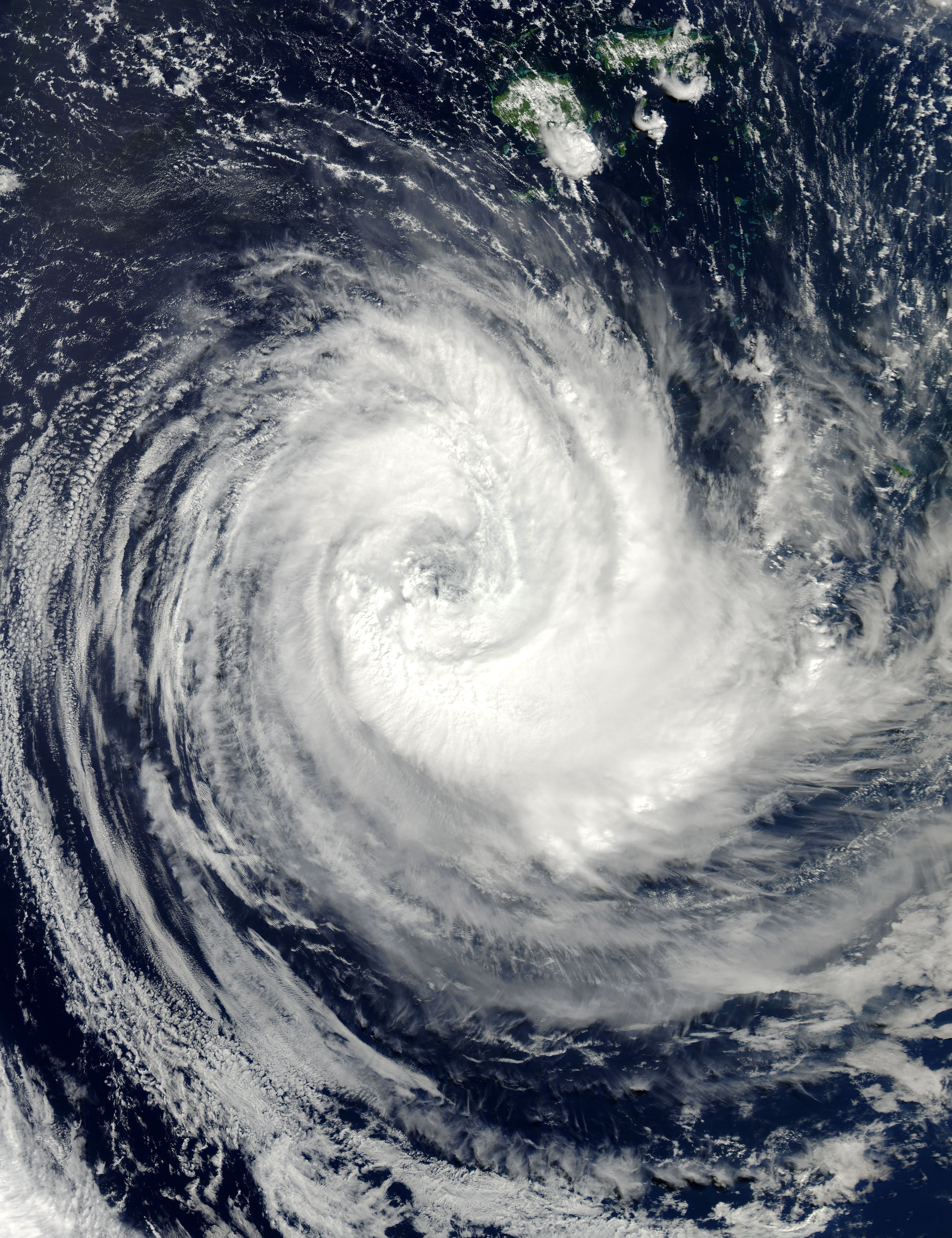
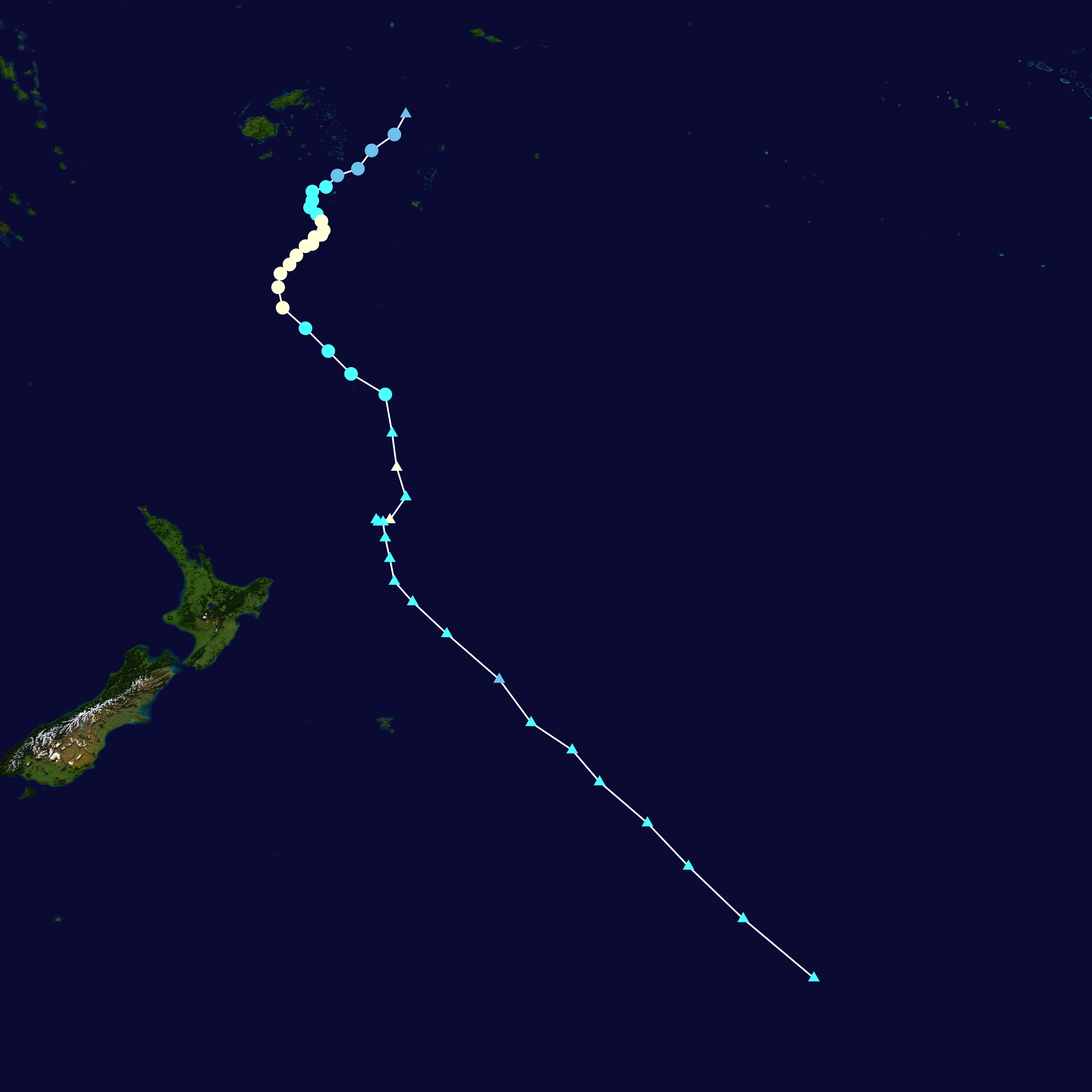
- Duration: March 22 – March 29
- Peak intensity: 130 km/h (80 mph) (10-min); 967 hPa (mbar)

On March 22, RSMC Nadi analyzed that a Tropical Disturbance had formed about 70 miles NNW of Fonualei island, Tonga. Later the same day it was upgraded to a Tropical Depression, and cyclone warnings were issued for islands in the Eastern Division of Fiji. As it neared the International Date Line it continued to strengthen and was named Tropical Cyclone Bune, and as it moved generally southwards it reached category 3 by March 25.

=== Other systems ===
The following tropical disturbances were also monitored by RSMC Nadi, however these systems were either short lived or did not develop significantly. On December 31, Tropical Disturbance 02F had developed within a trough of low pressure about 930 km (580 mi) to the southeast of Pago Pago in American Samoa. Over the next few days the disturbance's organisation slightly increased in an area of low vertical windshear, before RSMC Nadi issued its final advisory on the disturbance as it moved south of 25°S into TCWC Wellington's area of responsibility. A few days later as Cyclone Vania was developing near Fiji, RSMC Nadi started to monitor Tropical Disturbance 04F which had developed within a monsoon trough, about 300 km (185 mi) to the northwest of the New Caledonian capital Nouméa. Over the next few days the disturbance remained weak and poorly organized, before RSMC Nadi issued their final advisory on the system during January 7, as the disturbance was not expected to develop into a tropical cyclone.

During March 7, Tropical Low 21U developed within the Australian region, about 1,000 km (620 mi) to the northwest of Yeppoon, Queensland. During that day the tropical low moved eastwards and into the South Pacific basin, where RSMC Nadi expected the system to develop into a tropical cyclone and designated it as Tropical Depression 12F during March 8. However, during that day as the system was steered south-eastwards into an area of moderate to high wind-shear, atmospheric convection surrounding the system decreased, before it was last noted during March 9. Tropical Disturbance 14F developed during April 9, near Vanuatu and over the next couple of days moved slowly south-eastwards, before it was last noted during April 11, after convection surrounding the system had failed to organize. Tropical Depression 15F developed during April 16, within an area of moderate vertical windshear about 600 km (375 mi) to the east of New Caledonia. During that day the depression moved towards the south-southeast before the final advisory on the system was issued, as it left the tropics and convection surrounding the system started to become unorganized. On April 28, a low-pressure area that had developed within the Australian region, was predicted to develop into a tropical disturbance as it moved into the South Pacific basin. During the next day it was classified as Tropical Depression 16F while it was located near New Caledonia, before it was last noted later that day as it moved out of the tropics. The final tropical depression of the season developed during 10 May, within an area of moderate to high vertical windshear, about 155 km (95 mi) to the northeast of Avarua on the Southern Cook island of Rarotonga. Over the next day the depression moved towards the southeast, before it was last noted later that day by RSMC Nadi as it moved into TCWC Wellington's area of responsibility.

== Season effects ==
This table lists all the storms that developed in the South Pacific to the east of longitude 160°E during the 2010–2011 season. It includes their intensity on the Australian Tropical cyclone intensity scale, duration, name, landfalls, deaths, and damages. All data is taken from RSMC Nadi and or TCWC Wellington, and all of the damage figures are in 2011 USD.

Name	Dates	Peak intensity			Areas affected	Damage (USD)	Deaths	Ref(s).
Name	Dates	Category	Wind speed	Pressure	Areas affected	Damage (USD)	Deaths	Ref(s).
01F	November 24 – 30	Tropical depression	65 km/h (40 mph)	999 hPa (29.50 inHg)	Vanuatu, Fiji	None	None	
02F	December 31 – January 2	Tropical disturbance	Not specified	1004 hPa (29.65 inHg)	None	None	None	
Vania	January 5 – 15	Category 2 tropical cyclone	100 km/h (65 mph)	973 hPa (28.73 inHg)	Fiji, Vanuatu; New Caledonia, New Zealand	$11 million	1	
04F	January 5 – 7	Tropical disturbance	Not specified	1002 hPa (29.59 inHg)	New Caledonia	None	None	
Zelia	January 16 – 17	Category 4 severe tropical cyclone	155 km/h (100 mph)	957 hPa (28.26 inHg)	New Caledonia, New Zealand	None	None	
Wilma	January 19 – 28	Category 4 severe tropical cyclone	185 km/h (115 mph)	939 hPa (27.73 inHg)	Samoan Islands; Tonga, New Zealand	$22 million	3	
07F	January 20 – 22	Tropical depression	65 km/h (40 mph)	996 hPa (29.41 inHg)	New Caledonia	None	None	
Anthony	January 24 – 25	Tropical depression	45 km/h (30 mph)	998 hPa (29.47 inHg)	None	None	None	
Yasi	January 26 – 31	Category 3 severe tropical cyclone	150 km/h (90 mph)	960 hPa (28.35 inHg)	Tuvalu, Fiji, Solomon Islands, Vanuatu	Minor	1	
Zaka	February 5 – 7	Category 2 tropical cyclone	95 km/h (60 mph)	985 hPa (29.09 inHg)	None	None	None	
Atu	February 13 – 24	Category 4 severe tropical cyclone	165 km/h (105 mph)	940 hPa (27.76 inHg)	Vanuatu	Unknown	None	
12F	March 7 – 9	Tropical depression	45 km/h (30 mph)	1002 hPa (29.59 inHg)	Vanuatu	None	None	
Bune	March 22 – 29	Category 3 severe tropical cyclone	130 km/h (80 mph)	967 hPa (28.56 inHg)	Fiji	None	None	
14F	April 10 – 11	Tropical disturbance	Not specified	1005 hPa (29.68 inHg)	Vanuatu	None	None	
15F	April 15 – 17	Tropical depression	55 km/h (35 mph)	999 hPa (29.50 inHg)	None	None	None	
16F	April 28 – 30	Tropical depression	Not specified	1002 hPa (29.59 inHg)	None	None	None	
17F	May 10 – 11	Tropical depression	55 km/h (35 mph)	1000 hPa (29.53 inHg)	None	None	None	
Season aggregates
17 systems	November 24–11 May		185 km/h (115 mph)	935 hPa (27.61 inHg)		>$33 million	5	

== See also ==
- Tropical cyclones in 2010 and 2011
- List of Southern Hemisphere cyclone seasons
- Atlantic hurricane seasons: 2010, 2011
- Pacific hurricane seasons: 2010, 2011
- Pacific typhoon seasons: 2010, 2011
- North Indian Ocean cyclone seasons: 2010, 2011
- 2010–11 Australian region cyclone season
- 2010–11 South-West Indian Ocean cyclone season
- South Atlantic tropical cyclone
