= Tropical cyclones in 1991 =

Year boundaries
- First system: Alison
- Formed: January 8, 1991
- Last system: Bryna
- Dissipated: January 10, 1992

Strongest system
- Name: Yuri (Note: The intensity of a tropical cyclone is usually measured by its lowest pressure. Going by the pressure statistic alone, Yuri and Ruth are tied for the lowest pressure annually at 895 hPa, but Yuri is slightly stronger by wind speed at 220 km/h compared to Ruth's 215.)
- Lowest pressure: 895 mbar (hPa); 26.43 inHg

Longest lasting system
- Name: Nat
- Duration: 19 days

Year statistics
- Total systems: 102
- Named systems: 78
- Total fatalities: 144,609 total
- Total damage: $13.71 billion (1991 USD)
Related articles
- 1991 Atlantic hurricane season
- 1991 Pacific hurricane season
- 1991 Pacific typhoon season
- 1991 North Indian Ocean cyclone season
- 1990–91 South-West Indian Ocean cyclone season
- 1991–92 South-West Indian Ocean cyclone season
- 1990–91 Australian region cyclone season
- 1991–92 Australian region cyclone season
- 1990–91 South Pacific cyclone season
- 1991–92 South Pacific cyclone season

In this satellite image, there are three active tropical cylones, with Tropical Storm A4 in the southwest, Typhoon Yuri reaching peak intensity in the center, and Tropical Storm Zelda forming on the right.

During 1991, tropical cyclones formed within seven different tropical cyclone basins, located within various parts of the Atlantic, Pacific and Indian Oceans. During the year, a total of 102 systems formed with 78 of these developing further and were named by the responsible warning centre. The strongest tropical cyclone of the year was Typhoon Yuri, which was estimated to have a minimum barometric pressure of 895 hPa (26.43 inHg). The deadliest tropical cyclone was Cyclone BOB 01, which caused 138,866 fatalities in Bangladesh, Northeastern India, Myanmar, Yunnan, while the costliest was Typhoon Mireille, which caused an estimated $10 billion USD in damage after striking Japan. Four Category 5 tropical cyclones formed in 1991.

Tropical cyclone activity in each basin is under the authority of an RSMC. The National Hurricane Center (NHC) is responsible for tropical cyclones in the North Atlantic and East Pacific. The Central Pacific Hurricane Center (CPHC) is responsible for tropical cyclones in the Central Pacific. Both the NHC and CPHC are subdivisions of the National Weather Service. Activity in the West Pacific is monitored by the Japan Meteorological Agency (JMA). Systems in the North Indian Ocean are monitored by the India Meteorological Department (IMD). The Météo-France located in Réunion (MFR) monitors tropical activity in the South-West Indian Ocean. The Australian region is monitored by five TCWCs that are under the coordination of the Australian Bureau of Meteorology (BOM). Similarly, the South Pacific is monitored by both the Fiji Meteorological Service (FMS) and the Meteorological Service of New Zealand Limited. Other, unofficial agencies that provide additional guidance in tropical cyclone monitoring include the Philippine Atmospheric, Geophysical and Astronomical Services Administration (PAGASA) and the Joint Typhoon Warning Center (JTWC).

== Systems ==
All storm information in this article is based on the tropical cyclone season articles on Wikipedia.

=== January ===
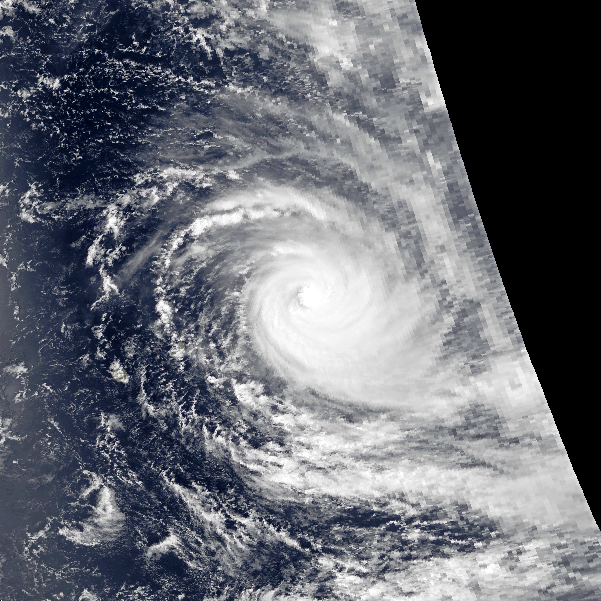
Cyclone Bella

January was the least active in terms of tropical cyclogenesis and named storms, with only three cyclones forming, two being named. Tropical Cyclone Bella caused flooding in Rodrigues.

Tropical cyclones formed in January 1991
Storm name	Dates active	Max wind km/h (mph)	Pressure (hPa)	Areas affected	Damage (USD)	Deaths	Refs
Alison	8–18 January	110 (70)	966	None	None	None	
Bella	18 January–4 February	155 (100)	936	Rodrigues	None	None	

=== February ===
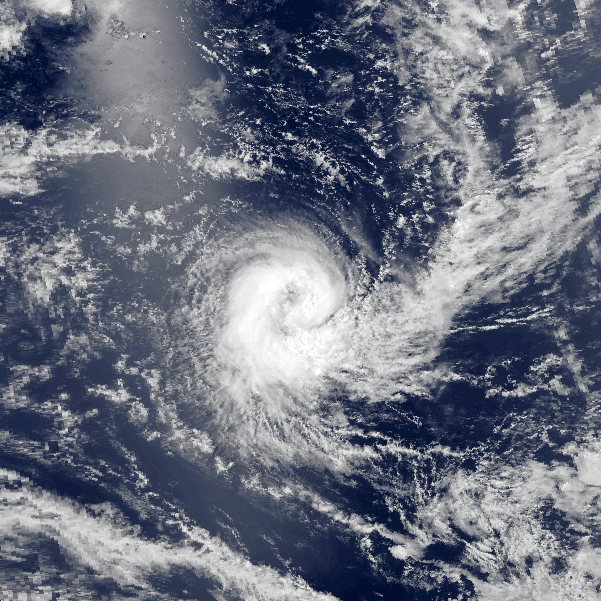
Severe Tropical Storm Elma

Tropical cyclones formed in February 1991
Storm name	Dates active	Max wind km/h (mph)	Pressure (hPa)	Areas affected	Damage (USD)	Deaths	Refs
Chris	15–21 February	110 (70)	976	Western Australia	None	None	
Cynthia	16–19 February	125 (75)	970	Madagascar	Unknown	36	
Daphne	21–28 February	110 (70)	976	Northern Australia	Unknown	Unknown	
Kelvin	21 February–5 March	110 (70)	980	None	None	None	
Debra	22 February–4 March	115 (70)	966	Mozambique	None	None	
Elma	26 February–5 March	105 (65)	965	None	None	None	

=== March ===
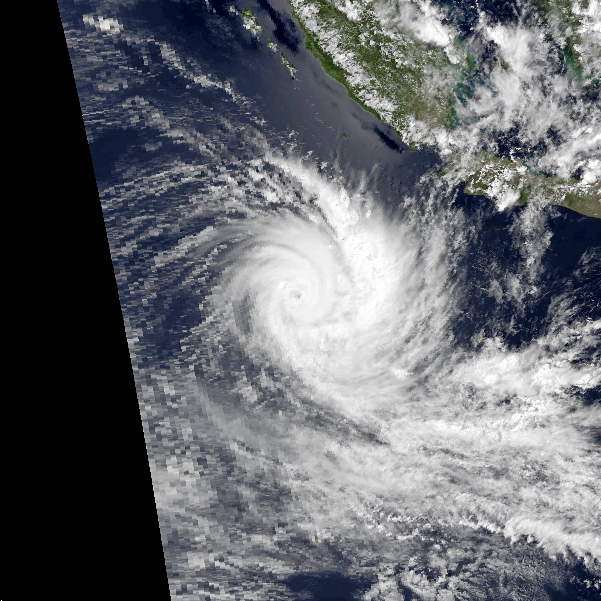
Severe Tropical Cyclone Errol at peak intensity in the eastern Indian Ocean

Tropical cyclones formed in March 1991
Storm name	Dates active	Max wind km/h (mph)	Pressure (hPa)	Areas affected	Damage (USD)	Deaths	Refs
15P	3–7 March	55 (35)	1000	Solomon Islands	None	None	
Sharon (Auring)	5–16 March	95 (60)	985	Caroline Islands, Philippines	None	None	
16P	15–21 March	55 (35)	1000	None	None	None	
Tim	20–27 March	120 (75)	970	Philippines, Japan	None	None	
Fatima	21 March–1 April	135 (85)	954	None	None	None	
Errol	23–31 April	175 (110)	950	None	None	21	
G1	30 March–3 April	55 (35)	998	Madagascar	Unknown	16	

=== April ===
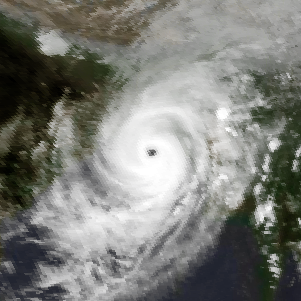
The 1991 Bangladesh cyclone prior to landfall

Tropical cyclones formed in April 1991
Storm name	Dates active	Max wind km/h (mph)	Pressure (hPa)	Areas affected	Damage (USD)	Deaths	Refs
Marian	9–19 April	185 (115)note	930	None	None	None	
Unnamed	10–14 April	65 (40)	Unknown	None	None	None	
Fifi	14–21 April	110 (70)	975	Western Australia	Unknown	29	
BOB 01	22–30 April	240 (150)	920	India, Bangladesh	$1.5 billion	138,866 (Note: Fourth deadliest tropical cyclone on record.)	
Vanessa (Bebeng)	23–28 April	85 (50)	994	Philippines, Vietnam, China	None	None	

=== May ===
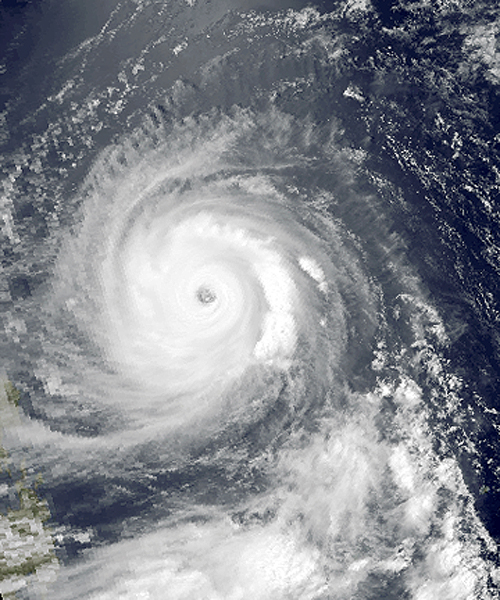
Typhoon Walt (Karing)

Tropical cyclones formed in May 1991
Storm name	Dates active	Max wind km/h (mph)	Pressure (hPa)	Areas affected	Damage (USD)	Deaths	Refs
Walt (Karing)	5–16 May	185 (115)	915	Caroline Islands, Mariana Islands, Philippines, Taiwan, Ryukyu Islands	None	None	
Lisa	7–11 May	110 (70)	975	Papua New Guinea, Solomon Islands, Vanuatu	None	None	
Andres	16–20 May	100 (65)	994	None	None	None	
TD	20 May	Unknown	1010	None	None	None	
BOB 02	30 May–5 June	85 (55)	990	India, Bangladesh	None	None	

=== June ===
Tropical cyclones formed in June 1991
Storm name	Dates active	Max wind km/h (mph)	Pressure (hPa)	Areas affected	Damage (USD)	Deaths	Refs
Yunya	12–17 June	150 (90)	950	Philippines, Taiwan	Unknown	326	
Blanca	14–22 June	100 (65)	994	None	None	None	
Carlos	16–27 June	195 (120)	955	None	None	None	
Delores	22–28 June	140 (85)	979	None	None	None	
Five-E	28–30 June	55 (35)	1006	Mexico	None	None	

=== July ===
Tropical cyclones formed in July 1991
Storm name	Dates active	Max wind km/h (mph)	Pressure (hPa)	Areas affected	Damage (USD)	Deaths	Refs
Ana	2–5 July	85 (50)	1000	Florida, Bahamas, South Carolina	Minimal	None	
Two	5–7 July	55 (35)	1007	Mexico	Minimal	None	
Zeke	9–15 July	120 (75)	970	Philippines, Hong Kong, southern China	$960 million	33	
Amy	14–20 July	230 (145)	930	Philippines, Taiwan, Hong Kong, China	$4.87 billion	136	
Enrique	15 July–1 August	120 (75)	987	None	None	None	
Brendan	19–25 July	140 (85)	980	Philippines, Taiwan, Macau, Hong Kong, China	$253 million	34	
Caitlin	21–30 July	175 (110)	940	Philippines, Japan, South Korea	$81.3 million	26	
BOB 03	27–31 July	55 (35)	984	India	Unknown	Unknown	
Fefa	29 July–8 August	195 (120)	959	Hawaiian Islands	Minimal	None	

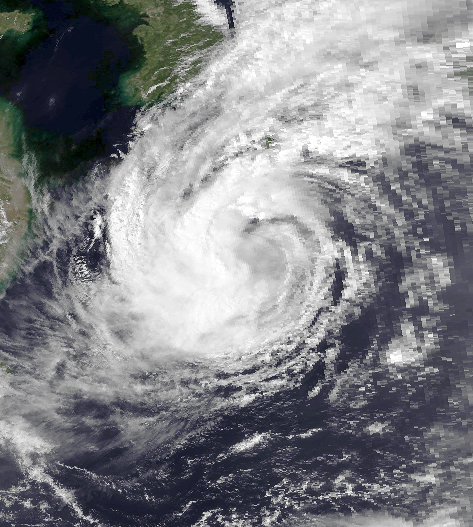
Tropical Storm Gladys on 21 August, southeast of Japan

=== August ===
Tropical cyclones formed in August 1991
Storm name	Dates active	Max wind km/h (mph)	Pressure (hPa)	Areas affected	Damage (USD)	Deaths	Refs
Guillermo	4–10 August	130 (80)	983	None	None	None	
Doug	7–10 August	65 (40)	1000	None	None	None	
Hilda	8–14 August	65 (40)	992	None	None	None	
Ellie	10–19 August	130 (80)	960	Taiwan, China	Unknown	Unknown	
Fred	11–18 August	140 (85)	960	Philippines, China, Vietnam, Laos	Unknown	5	
13W	11–13 August	45 (30)	1002	None	None	None	
Gladys	15–24 August	120 (75)	965	Japan, South Korea	$253 million	113	
Bob	16–20 August	185 (115)	950	North Carolina, Mid-Atlantic, New England, Atlantic Canada, Iberian Peninsula	$1.47 billion	17	
BOB 04	21–26 August	45 (30)	992	India	Unknown	Unknown	
Four	24–26 August	55 (35)	1007	None	None	None	
15W	26–30 August	65 (40)	992	Japan, South Korea	Unknown	Unknown	
Five	28–31 August	55 (35)	1007	None	None	None	
Harry	28–31 August	75 (45)	992	Japan	Unknown	Unknown	

=== September ===
Tropical cyclones formed in September 1991
Storm name	Dates active	Max wind km/h (mph)	Pressure (hPa)	Areas affected	Damage (USD)	Deaths	Refs
Ivy	2–10 September	175 (110)	935	Japan	Unknown	1	
Joel	3–8 September	85 (50)	985	China	Unknown	5	
Claudette	4–12 September	215 (130)	944	None	None	None	
Danny	7–11 September	85 (50)	998	None	None	None	
Erika	8–12 September	95 (60)	997	None	None	None	
01S	10–13 September	85 (50)	Unknown	None	None	None	
Ten-E	12–14 September	55 (35)	1005	Mexico	Minimal	None	
Mireille	13 September–4 October	240 (150)	910	Saipan, South Korea, Japan, Alaska	$10 billion	68	
Luke	14-19 September	100 (65)	980	Japan	$179 million	12	
Nat	14 September–3 October	150 (90)	950	Philippines, Taiwan, China	$16.7 million	2	
Ignacio	16–19 September	100 (65)	994	Mexico	Minimal	2	
Jimena	20 September–2 October	215 (130)	945	None	None	None	
BOB 05	21–22 September	45 (30)	1000	India	Unknown	Unknown	
Kevin	25 September–12 October	230 (145)	935	Mexico	Unknown	Unknown	

=== October ===
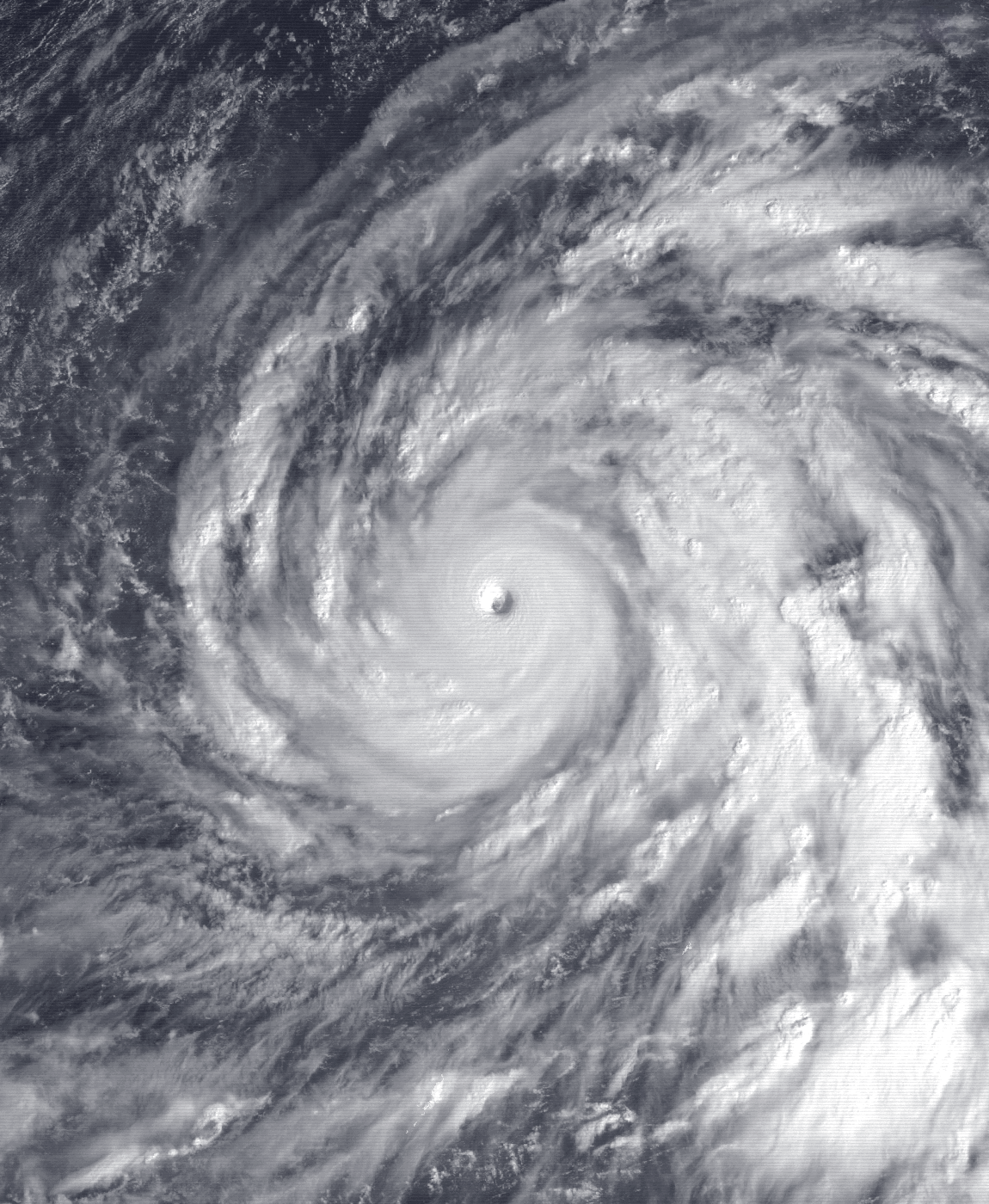
Typhoon Ruth (Trining)

Tropical cyclones formed in October 1991
Storm name	Dates active	Max wind km/h (mph)	Pressure (hPa)	Areas affected	Damage (USD)	Deaths	Refs
Orchid	October 3–14	175 (110)	930	Guam, Japan	$15.8 million	3	
Pat	October 4–13	150 (90)	925	Mariana Islands	None	None	
Marty	October 7–18	130 (80)	979	Southwestern Mexico, Revillagigedo Islands, Baja California Peninsula	None	None	
BOB 06	October 12–14	45 (30)	998	Bangladesh, India	Unknown	Unknown	
A2	October 14–22	50 (30)	997	Madagascar	None	None	
Fabian	October 15–16	75 (45)	1002	Cuba, Florida	Minimal	None	
Ruth	October 19–31	215 (130)	895	Caroline Islands, Mariana Islands, Taiwan, Philippines	$151 million	82	
Ten	October 24–25	45 (30)	1009	None	None	None	
Grace	October 25–29	165 (105)	980	Bermuda	None	None	
BOB 07	October 28–30	45 (30)	998	India	Unknown	Unknown	
Unnamed	October 31–November 2	120 (75)	980	East Coast of the United States, Atlantic Canada	$200 million	13	

=== November ===
Tropical cyclones formed in November 1991
Storm name	Dates active	Max wind km/h (mph)	Pressure (hPa)	Areas affected	Damage (USD)	Deaths	Refs
Seth	1–15 November	185 (115)	925	Philippines	Unknown	Unknown	
Thelma	1–8 November	75 (45)	991	Philippines, Vietnam	$27.7 million	5,081	
Verne	5–12 November	100 (65)	980	None	None	None	
Nora	7–12 November	165 (105)	970	None	None	None	
BOB 08	9–16 November	85 (50)	998	India	Unknown	40+	
Tia	13–21 November	140 (85)	960	Kiribati, Solomon Islands, Vanuatu	Unknown	None	
Wilda	14–20 November	85 (50)	992	Philippines	Unknown	Unknown	
Yuri	17 November–3 December	280 (175)	885	Pohnpei, Guam	$36 million	None	
A4	21–29 November	70 (45)	991	None	None	None	
Zelda	27 November–7 December	150 (90)	975	Marshall Islands, Alaska, Canada	Unknown	None	

=== December ===
Tropical cyclones formed in December 1991
Storm name	Dates active	Max wind km/h (mph)	Pressure (hPa)	Areas affected	Damage (USD)	Deaths	Refs
Graham	2–12 December	205 (125)	915	Cocos Island	Unknown	Unknown	
Wasa-Arthur	3–18 December	195 (120)	938	French Polynesia	$60 million	2	
Val	4–17 December	230 (145)	916	Tuvalu, Tokelau, Wallis and Futuna, Samoan Islands, Cook Islands, Tonga	$381 million	17	
Alexandra	18–29 December	105 (65)	972	Mauritius	Unknown	Unknown	
Bryna	25 December–10 January	70 (45)	988	Madagascar	Unknown	Unknown	

== Global effects ==
There are a total of seven tropical cyclone basins that tropical cyclones typically form in. In this table, data from all these basins are added.

Season name		Areas affected	Systems formed	Named storms	Hurricane-force tropical cyclones	Damage (1991 USD)	Deaths	Ref(s)
Northern Hemisphere
North Atlantic Ocean (Note: The wind speeds for this tropical cyclone/basin are based on the Saffir Simpson Scale which uses 1-minute sustained winds.)		East Coast of the United States, Greater Antilles, Bermudas, Atlantic Canada, Iberian Peninsula	12	8	4	$1.68 billion	30	
Eastern and Central Pacific Ocean		Central America, Southwestern Mexico, Revillagigedo Islands, Baja California Peninsula, Northwestern Mexico, Hawaiian Islands	16	14	10	Unknown	24	
Western Pacific Ocean (Note: Only systems that formed either before or on December 31, 1991 are counted in the seasonal totals.)		Marshall Islands, Caroline Islands, Mariana Islands, Philippines, Japan, Vietnam, Philippines, Taiwan, China, Ryukyu Islands, Korean Peninsula, Cambodia, Laos, Thailand, Myanmar, Aleutian Islands	38	30	20	$17.45 billion	5,964	
North Indian Ocean (Note: The wind speeds for this tropical cyclone/basin are based on the IMD Scale which uses 3-minute sustained winds.)		South Asia, Northeastern India	8	3	1	$1.7 billion	138,906	
Southern Hemisphere
South-West Indian Ocean	January – June (Note: Only systems that formed either on or after January 1, 1991 are counted in the seasonal totals.) (Note: The wind speeds for this tropical cyclone are based on Météo-France, which uses wind gusts.)	Réunion, Madagascar, Mozambique, Juan de Nova Island, Rodrigues, Mauritius, Europa Island	8	7	5	—N/a	88	
South-West Indian Ocean	July – December	Madagascar	6	4	1	—N/a	—N/a	
Australian region	January – June	Australia, Papua New Guinea	9	7	3	—N/a	21	
Australian region	July – December	—N/a	1	1	1	—N/a	—N/a	
South Pacific Ocean	January – June	—N/a	—N/a	—N/a	—N/a	—N/a	—N/a	
South Pacific Ocean	July – December	Kiribati, Solomon Islands, Vanuatu, Tuvalu, Tokelau, Wallis and Futuna, Samoan Islands, Cook Islands, Tonga, French Polynesia	3	3	3	$441 million	19	
South Atlantic Ocean		Angola	1	1	—N/a	—N/a	—N/a	
Worldwide		(See above)	102 (Note: The sum of the number of systems in each basin will not equal the number shown as the total. This is because when systems move between basins, it creates a discrepancy in the actual number of systems.)	78	48	$21.24 billion	145,052 (Note: The number in the bracket indicates indirect deaths.)	

== See also ==
- Tropical cyclones by year
- List of earthquakes in 1991
- Tornadoes of 1991
