= Tropical Storm Zelda (1991) =

Pacific tropical cyclone

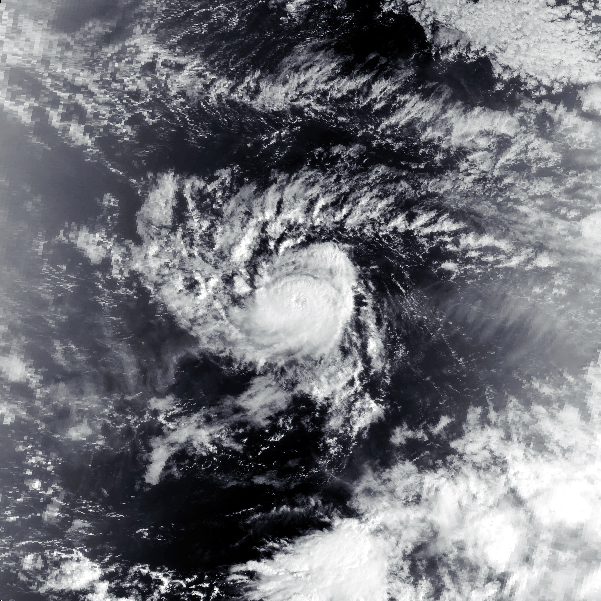
- Zelda near the Marshall Islands on November 29, 1991

Meteorological history
- Formed: November 27, 1991
- Extratropical: December 5, 1991
- Dissipated: December 7, 1991

Severe tropical storm
- 10-minute sustained (JMA)
- Highest winds: 110 km/h (70 mph)
- Lowest pressure: 975 hPa (mbar); 28.79 inHg

Category 1-equivalent typhoon
- 1-minute sustained (SSHWS/JTWC)
- Highest winds: 150 km/h (90 mph)

Overall effects
- Fatalities: None
- Areas affected: Marshall Islands, Alaska, Canada
- IBTrACS
- Part of the 1991 Pacific typhoon season

Severe Tropical Storm Zelda was the last tropical cyclone of the 1991 Pacific typhoon season; it struck the Marshall Islands on November 28. The area of low pressure that eventually became Zelda formed near the International Date Line, and strengthened into a tropical depression on November 27. The Joint Typhoon Warning Center (JTWC) reported that the depression had reached tropical storm intensity near the Marshall Islands on November 28, thus naming it Zelda. On November 29, the storm quickly strengthened to 65 knots (120 km/h; 75 mph) according to the JTWC, equivalent to a Category 1 typhoon on the Saffir–Simpson hurricane wind scale. It reached a peak of 80 kn (150 km/h; 90 mph) according to the JTWC, and 60 kn (110 km/h; 70 mph) according to the Japanese Meteorological Agency (JMA), with a barometric pressure of 975 hectopascals (28.8 inHg). Zelda weakened into a tropical storm on December 2, and then a tropical depression two days later. The JTWC discontinued warnings late on December 4, while the JMA declared the storm to be extratropical the next day and continued to track until it crossed the International Date Line again on December 7.

Zelda caused significant damage in the Marshall Islands, and operations at Kwajalein Missile Range were disrupted severely. No deaths or injuries were reported. About 60 percent of homes were destroyed in Ebeye Island, leaving 6,000 people without residence. Nearly all crops on the islands were destroyed, and food and other supplies were contaminated by salt. Later in December, the president of the United States, George H. W. Bush declared the storm to be a major disaster, allowing the Federal Emergency Management Agency (FEMA) to assist with funding and repairs. The Marshall Islands also requested funds from other countries.

== Meteorological history ==
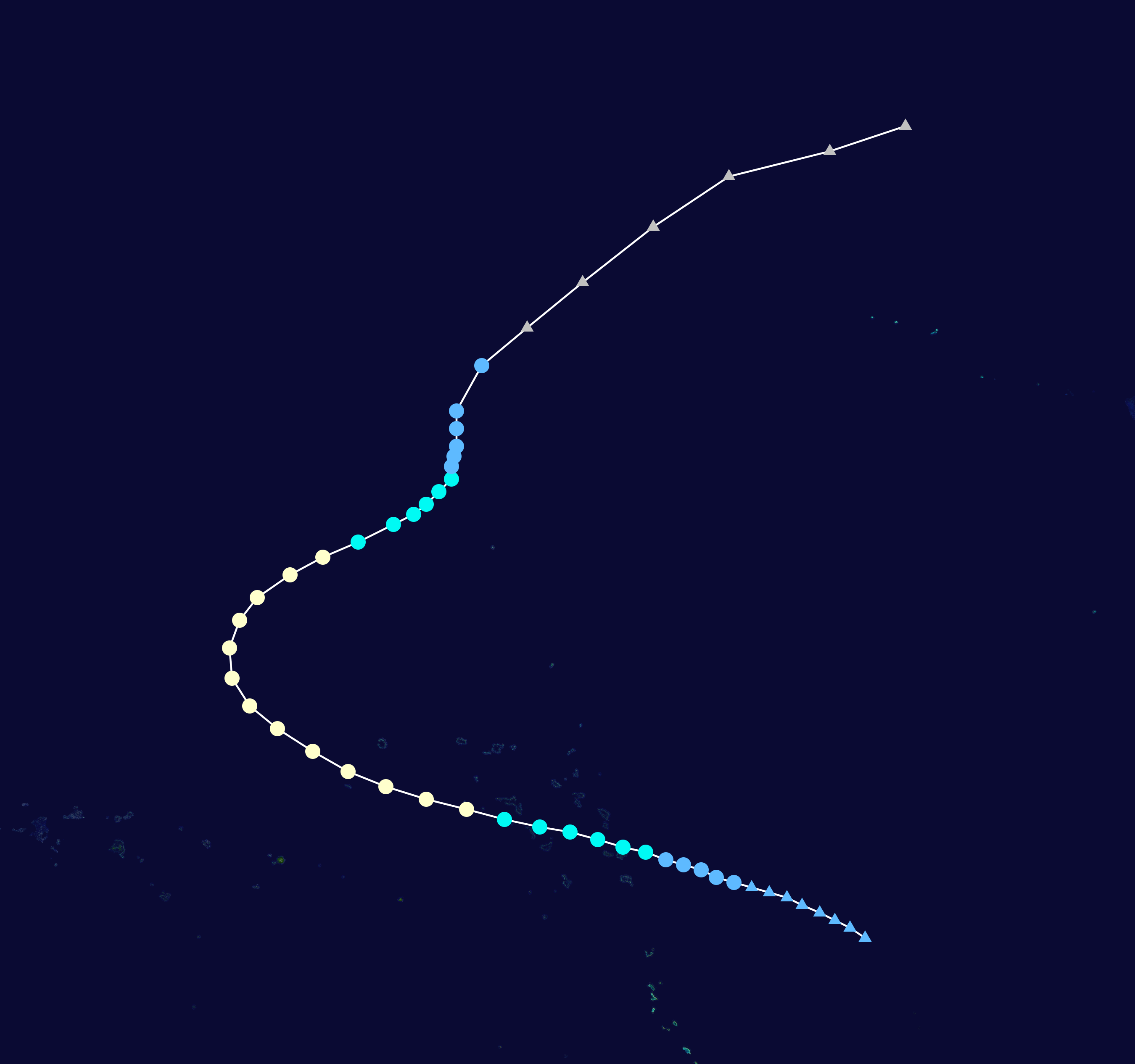
Map plotting the storm's track and intensity, according to the Saffir–Simpson scale Map key Saffir–Simpson scale Tropical depression (≤38 mph, ≤62 km/h) Tropical storm (39–73 mph, 63–118 km/h) Category 1 (74–95 mph, 119–153 km/h) Category 2 (96–110 mph, 154–177 km/h) Category 3 (111–129 mph, 178–208 km/h) Category 4 (130–156 mph, 209–251 km/h) Category 5 (≥157 mph, ≥252 km/h) Unknown Storm type Tropical cyclone Subtropical cyclone Extratropical cyclone, remnant low, tropical disturbance, or monsoon depression

Westerly winds near the equator – associated with an ongoing El Niño event – assisted in spawning a weak area of low pressure in late November 1991 near the International Date Line. The JTWC began tracking the area on the Significant Tropical Weather Advisory at 06:00 UTC on November 25. Vertical wind shear prevented strengthening at first, but the disturbance continued to develop. A tropical cyclone formation alert from the Joint Typhoon Warning Center (JTWC) soon followed. The Japan Meteorological Agency (JMA) started tracking the disturbance at 06:00 UTC on November 27, (Note: The Japan Meteorological Agency is the official Regional Specialized Meteorological Center for the western Pacific Ocean.) and the JTWC issued their first warning 18 hours later on the depression, naming it 31W. The depression quickly intensified, and it was designated a tropical storm at 00:00 UTC on November 28 by the JTWC, with winds of 35 knots (65 km/h; 40 mph). (Note: Wind estimates from the JMA and most other basins throughout the world are sustained over 10–minutes, while estimates from the United States-based Joint Typhoon Warning Center are sustained over 1–minute. Sustained 1–minute winds are about 1.14 times the amount of 10 minute winds.) Operationally, the storm was upgraded twenty-four hours later and given the name Zelda, after Kwajalein received stronger winds than expected. The JTWC attributed the delay to the small size of the storm, the poorly organized outflow, and the lack of visible and infrared image pairs for analysis. The JMA upgraded the storm at 03:00 UTC on November 29, then to a severe tropical storm eighteen hours later. The JTWC reported that Zelda intensified into a typhoon at 12:00 UTC near the Marshall Islands, with winds of 65 kn (120 km/h; 75 mph), equivalent to a Category 1 on the Saffir–Simpson hurricane wind scale. At that time, the JMA kept it as a tropical storm with winds of 45 kn (85 km/h; 50 mph), with a pressure reading of 990 hectopascals (29 inHg).

Around 06:00 UTC on November 30, the JMA estimated Zelda had reached its peak at 60 kn (110 km/h; 70 mph), with a barometric pressure of 975 hPa (28.8 inHg). Six hours later, the JTWC reported the storm had strengthened to maximum sustained winds of 80 kn (150 km/h; 90 mph), west of Enewetak. Later, a trough created by Typhoon Yuri caused the subtropical ridge to weaken, allowing Zelda to move northward. By December 1, the storm began to weaken and turned northeast. On December 2, the JMA reported the storm's winds had decreased to 50 kn (95 km/h; 60 mph). The JTWC reported the storm weakened below typhoon strength on 18:00 UTC of the same day, with winds of 60 kn (110 km/h; 70 mph). Upper-level winds and westerlies soon increased, and Zelda's central convection became sheared. The JMA downgraded Zelda to a tropical storm on December 3, and to a tropical depression later that day. A few hours later, the JTWC downgraded the storm to a tropical depression, as it unexpectedly turned to the northwest. The low-level circulation of the storm detached from the cold front, and the JTWC issued the last warning of the year. The depression turned back northeast, the JMA declared the storm to be extratropical on December 5, and the agency stopped tracking it just past the International Date Line on December 7. Remnants of the storm moved inland into northern British Columbia by December 8.

== Impact and aftermath ==
Zelda was the first of three storms to strike the Marshall Islands within one year, just before Axel and Gay in 1992. The storm affected Marshall Islands on November 28, producing sustained winds ranging from 120–160 km/h (75–100 mph). The storm impacted islands of Kwajalein, Majuro, Lae, Wotho, and Eniwetok. Kwajalein Missile Range, which was used in Strategic Defense Initiative testing, caught stronger winds than expected from the storm, affecting operations at the missile range. A pressure of 990.1 hPa (29.24 inHg) was recorded on Kwajalein, which was the lowest pressure recorded on the atoll at that time. On Ebeye Island, 60 percent of homes made of plywood and sheet-iron roofs were destroyed by the storm, and 6,000 people were left homeless. Food and water supplies were contaminated from salt in storm surge, and the water desalination plant became inoperable. Power lines were cut across the island. There were no deaths or significant injuries. Other islands in the nation had their water contaminated by saltwater, and 95 percent of the crops were destroyed by the storm surge. Coral reefs were also heavily damaged when the storm came nearby. As an extratropical cyclone, Zelda bought heavy rain and 110 km/h (70 mph) winds to Southeast Alaska. Heavy snow was reported in northern British Columbia, and lesser amounts inland British Columbia and southern Yukon.

The United States Army engaged in clean up and repairing in the country. On December 6, the 834th Airlift Division sent six C-130s to Kwajalein with supplies. On the same day, President of the United States George H. W. Bush, through the Compact of Free Association, declared a major disaster in the Marshall Islands, allowing federal funding to be sent to the Arno, Aur, Kwajalein, Lae, Lib, Namu and Ujae islands. United States Senator Daniel Akaka visited Ebeye after the storm, and he criticized the response of the Federal Emergency Management Agency (FEMA), as the funding did not cover repairing of structures regarded as substandard. The Government of the Marshall Islands requested for aid via United Nations Disaster Relief Organization (UNDRO) on December 18. By December 19, 1,380 people were still living in temporary shelters.

By March 26, 1992, about $98,000 (1992 USD, equivalent to $219,588 in 2024) worth of relief goods were sent to the Marshall Islands from UNDRO, United Nations Development Programme (UNDP), and Government of Australia. FEMA sent $1.518 million (1992 USD, equivalent to $3,401,371 in 2024) to affected families. Critical infrastructure in Ebeye were repaired by the Kwajalein Atoll Development Authority by November 1992.

== See also ==
- Other tropical cyclones named Zelda
- List of Alaska tropical cyclones
