= List of storms named Zelda =

The name Zelda has been used to name two tropical cyclones in the northwestern Pacific.

- Tropical Storm Zelda (1991) (T9129, 31W) – A Category 1 typhoon that struck the Marshall Islands making 5,000 people homeless.
- Typhoon Zelda (1994) (T9434, 37W, Esang) – A Category 4 super typhoon that damaged homes on Saipan and Tinian
