= 1991 North Indian Ocean cyclone season =

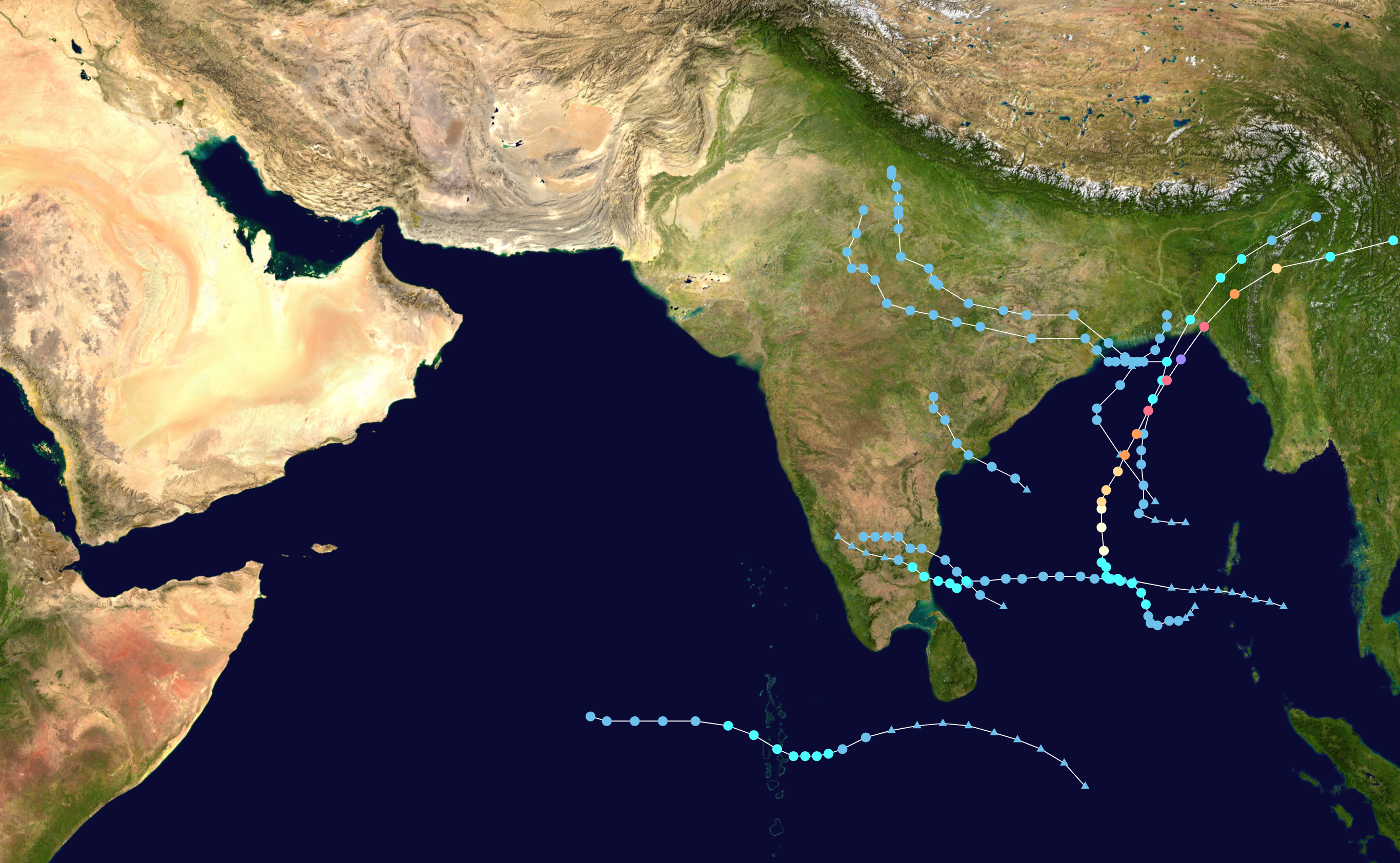
- Season summary map

Seasonal boundaries
- First system formed: January 17, 1991
- Last system dissipated: November 16, 1991

Strongest storm
- Name: BOB 01
  - Maximum winds: 235 km/h (145 mph) (3-minute sustained)
  - Lowest pressure: 918 hPa (mbar)

Seasonal statistics
- Depressions: 8 official, 1 unofficial
- Deep depressions: 4
- Cyclonic storms: 3
- Severe cyclonic storms: 1
- Very severe cyclonic storms: 1
- Extremely severe cyclonic storms: 1
- Super cyclonic storms: 1
- Total fatalities: >138,906
- Total damage: $1.7 billion (1991 USD)

Related articles
- 1991 Atlantic hurricane season; 1991 Pacific hurricane season; 1991 Pacific typhoon season

The 1991 North Indian Ocean cyclone season was a below average but extremely deadly and destructive season causing the deaths of more than 138,000 people and over $1.5 billion in damages. It was the period in which tropical cyclones formed to the north of the equator in the Indian Ocean. During the season tropical cyclones were monitored by the India Meteorological Department (IMD) and the Joint Typhoon Warning Center. The IMD assigned all depressions that it monitored with BOB followed by a number in numerical order. The JTWC also assigned a number and either the letter A or B depending on where the depression was when the first advisory was issued.

During the year there were eight depressions that were monitored by the IMD while the JTWC monitored four during the year of which one was not monitored by the IMD. The first cyclone of the year formed on January 17 and had little effect on ships that were moving through the Arabian sea to take part in the Gulf War. The deadliest cyclone during the year was Super Cyclonic Storm BOB 01, which killed over 138,000 people.

== Season summary ==
During 1991 the India Meteorological Department officially monitored eight cyclonic disturbances, which included five depressions and three cyclonic storms. For the sixth and final year in a row, there was no cyclonic storms officially monitored within the Arabian Sea. However, the United States Joint Typhoon Warning Center unofficially monitored a tropical storm within the Arabian Sea, during January that posed a direct threat to Coalition forces in the buildup to the Gulf War. The first official system of the season was the strongest, deadliest, and most damaging system of the season

== Systems ==
=== Super Cyclonic Storm BOB 01 ===
- Super cyclonic storm (IMD)
- Category 5 tropical cyclone (SSHWS)
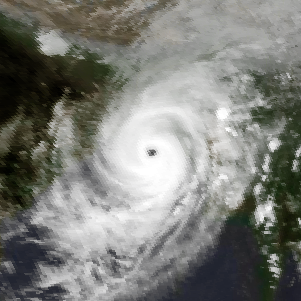
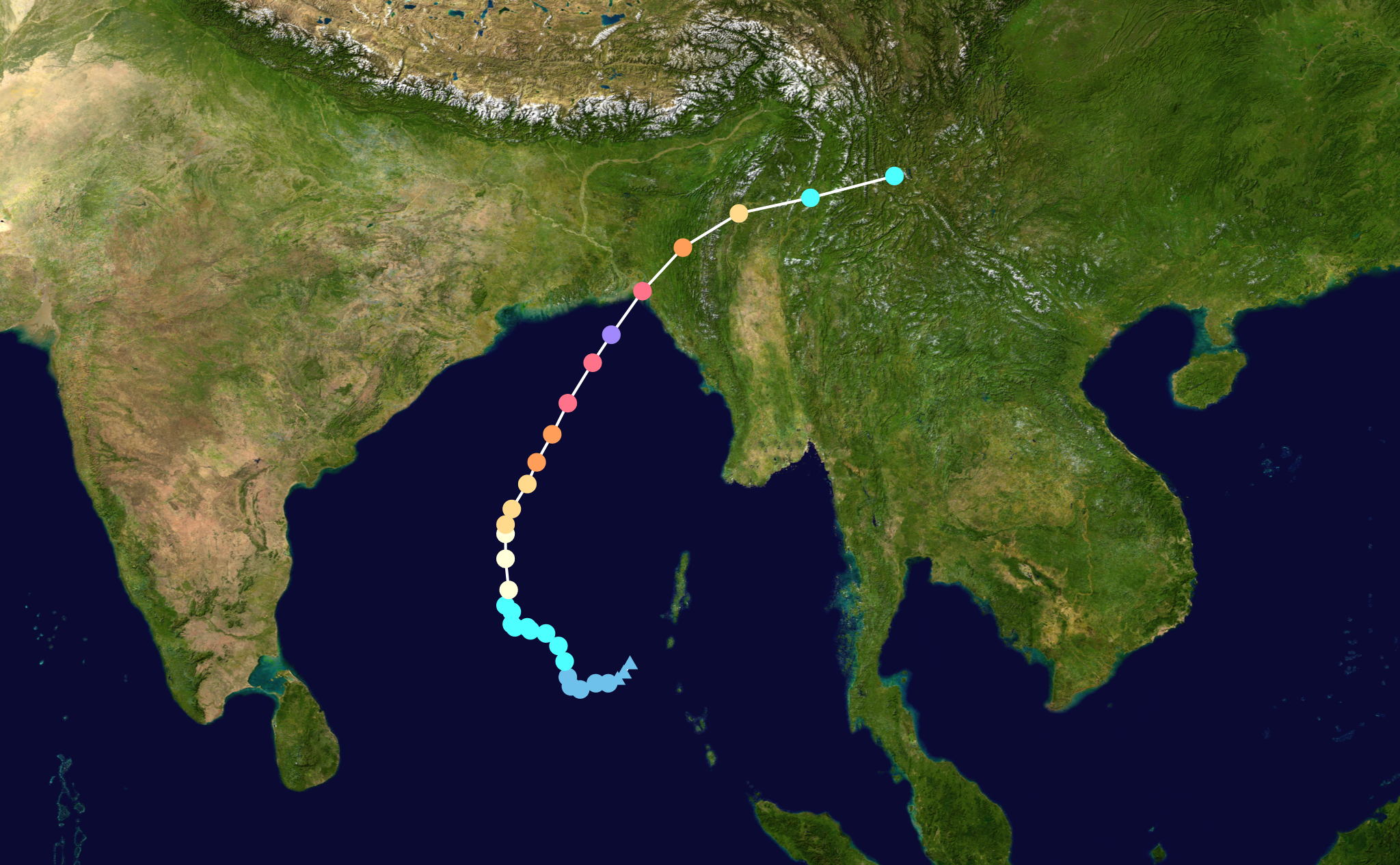
- Duration: April 22 – April 30
- Peak intensity: 235 km/h (145 mph) (3-min); 920 hPa (mbar)

BOB 01, tracked by the Joint Typhoon Warning Center as 02B, hit Bangladesh on April 29 as a strong cyclone. It brought a tremendous storm surge and massive wind damage, resulting in the deaths of over 138,000 people. BOB 01 was the deadliest cyclone on Earth since the 1970 Bhola Cyclone. It also destroyed an estimated 1 million homes, leaving as many as 10 million people (a substantial portion of the country's population) homeless.

=== Cyclonic Storm BOB 02 ===
- Cyclonic storm (IMD)
- Tropical storm (SSHWS)
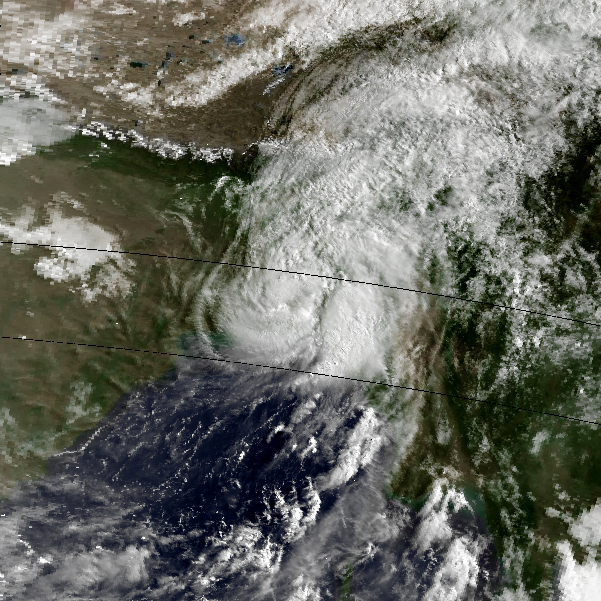
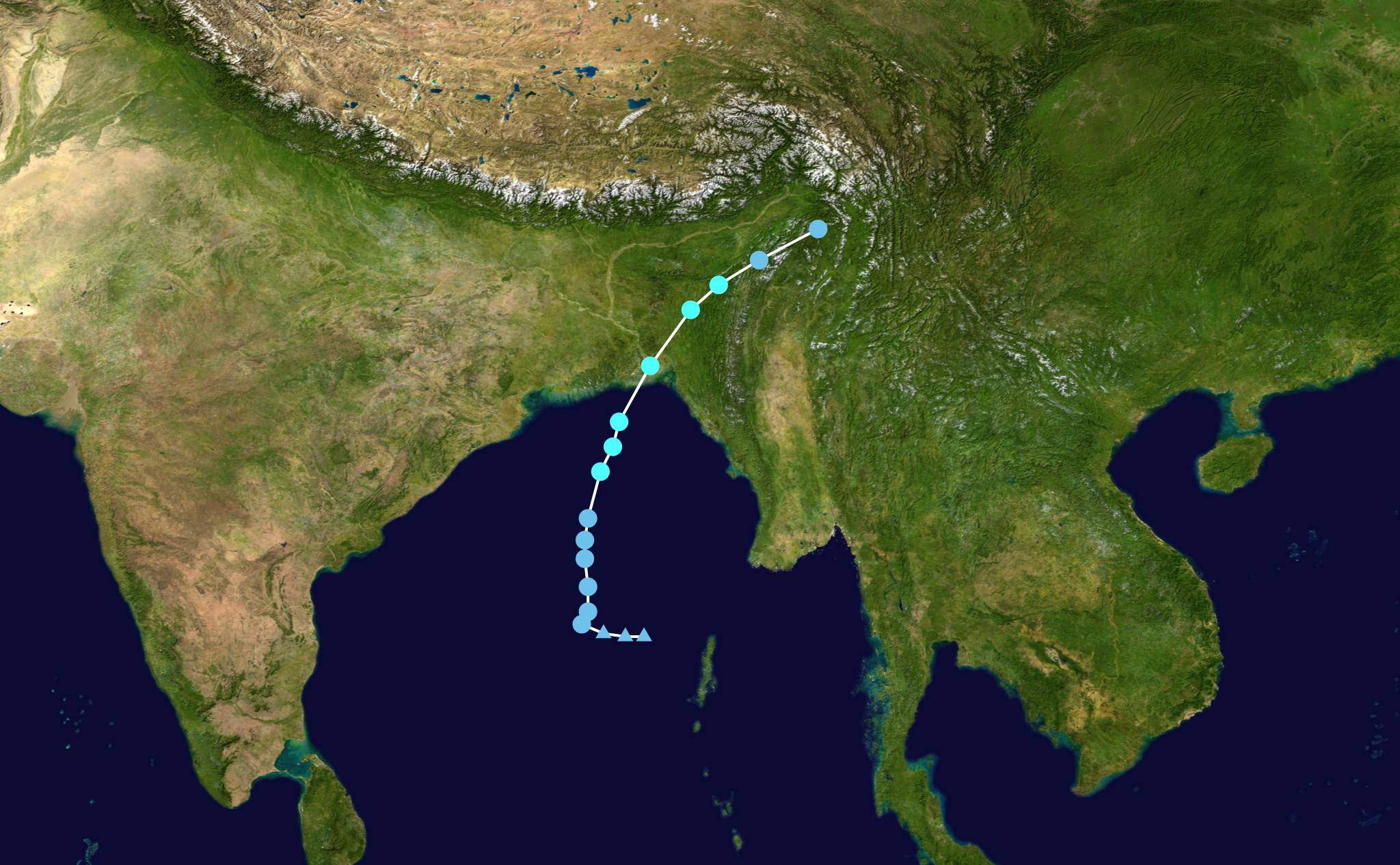
- Duration: May 30 – June 3
- Peak intensity: 85 km/h (50 mph) (3-min); 990 hPa (mbar)

On May 30, a depression formed in the Bay of Bengal. It moved north-northeastward and strengthened to a 60 mph tropical storm on June 2. BOB 02 affected the same region as the super cyclonic storm nearly a month earlier. Although the storm disrupted relief efforts, as a result of well-executed warnings, it caused no reported fatalities. BOB 02 dissipated inland the next day.

=== Deep Depression BOB 03 ===
- Deep depression (IMD)
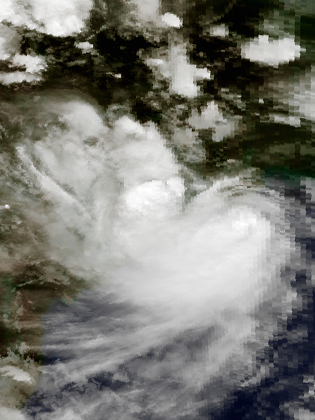
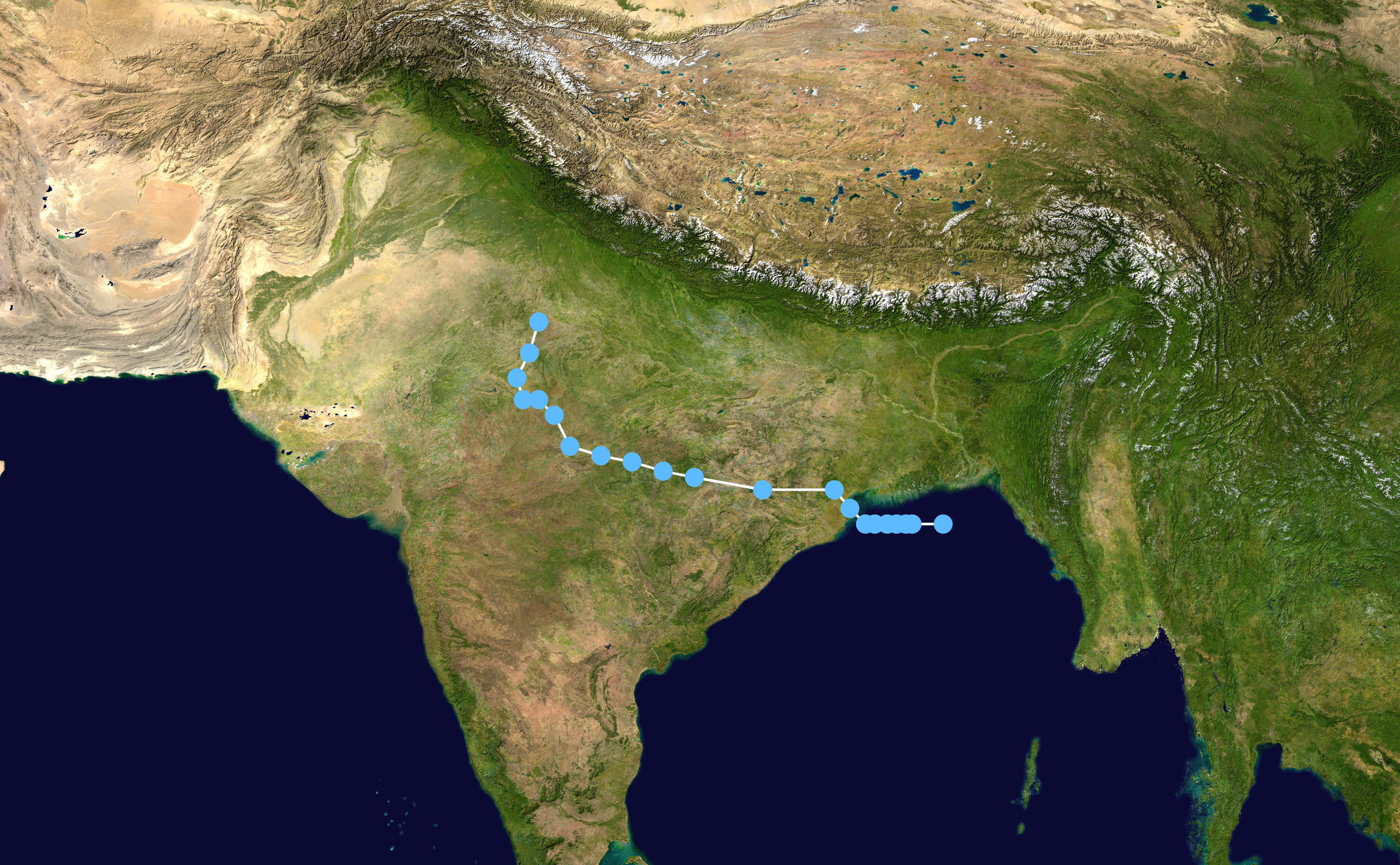
- Duration: July 27 – July 31
- Peak intensity: 55 km/h (35 mph) (3-min); 984 hPa (mbar)

During July 27, a depression developed over the northern Bay of Bengal to the east of the Indian state of Odisha. Over the next day the system moved westwards and developed into a Deep Depression, as it made landfall near Badudebpur in Odisha with estimated winds of 55 km/h (35 mph). The system dissipated over East Rajasthan during July 31, as it enhanced monsoon activities over northern and eastern India.

=== Depression BOB 04 ===
- Depression (IMD)
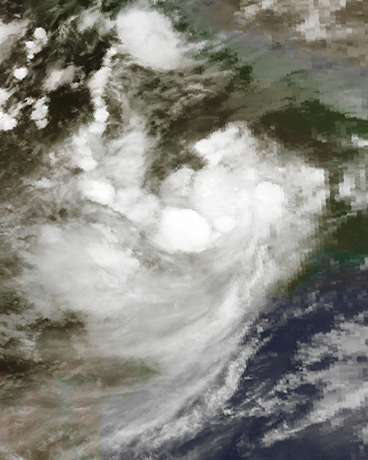
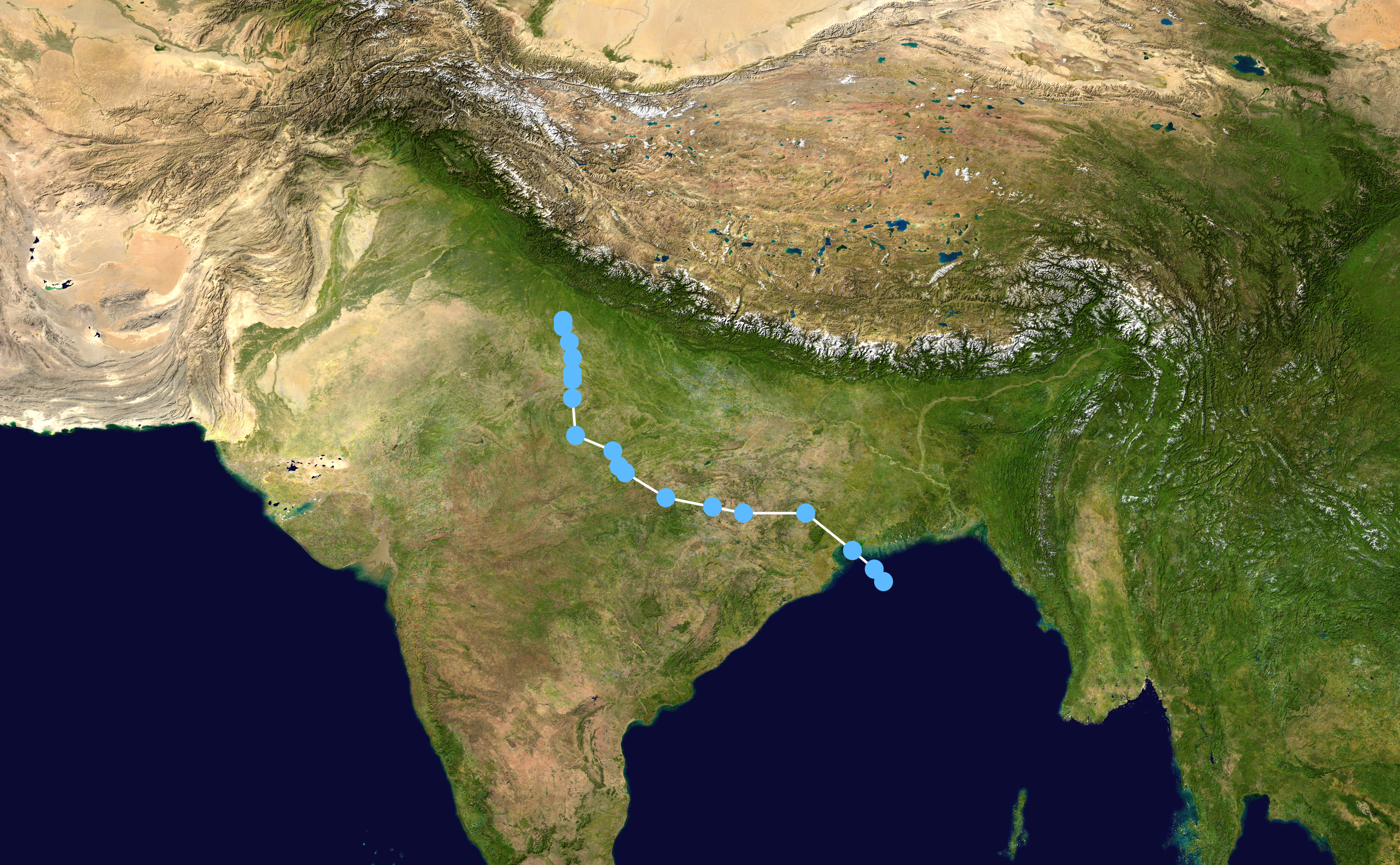
- Duration: August 21 – August 26
- Peak intensity: 45 km/h (30 mph) (3-min); 992 hPa (mbar)

Early on August 22, reported that Depression BOB 04 had formed about 160 km (100 mi), to the southeast of Balasore, India. As the depression moved towards northwest, it failed to intensify any further. The depression made landfall in the Indian state of Odisha later that day and maintained its identity until it weakened into a low-pressure area early on August 26. The depression's windspeeds were estimated to have peaked at 45 km/h (30 mph), whilst the lowest pressure recorded was 992 hPa.

=== Depression BOB 05 ===
- Depression (IMD)
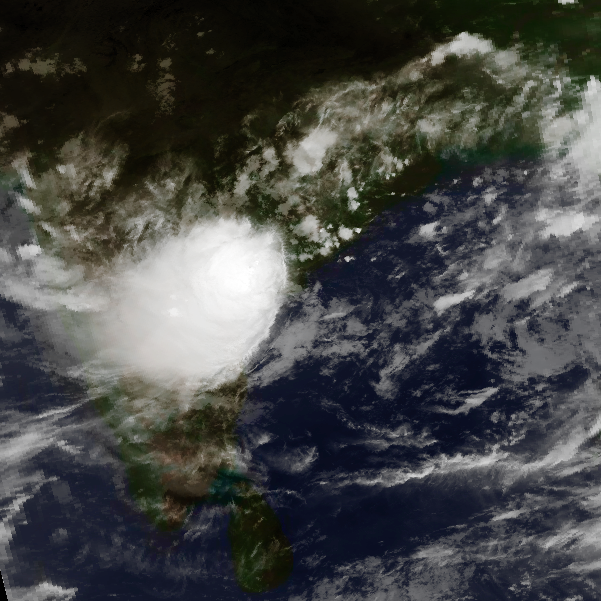
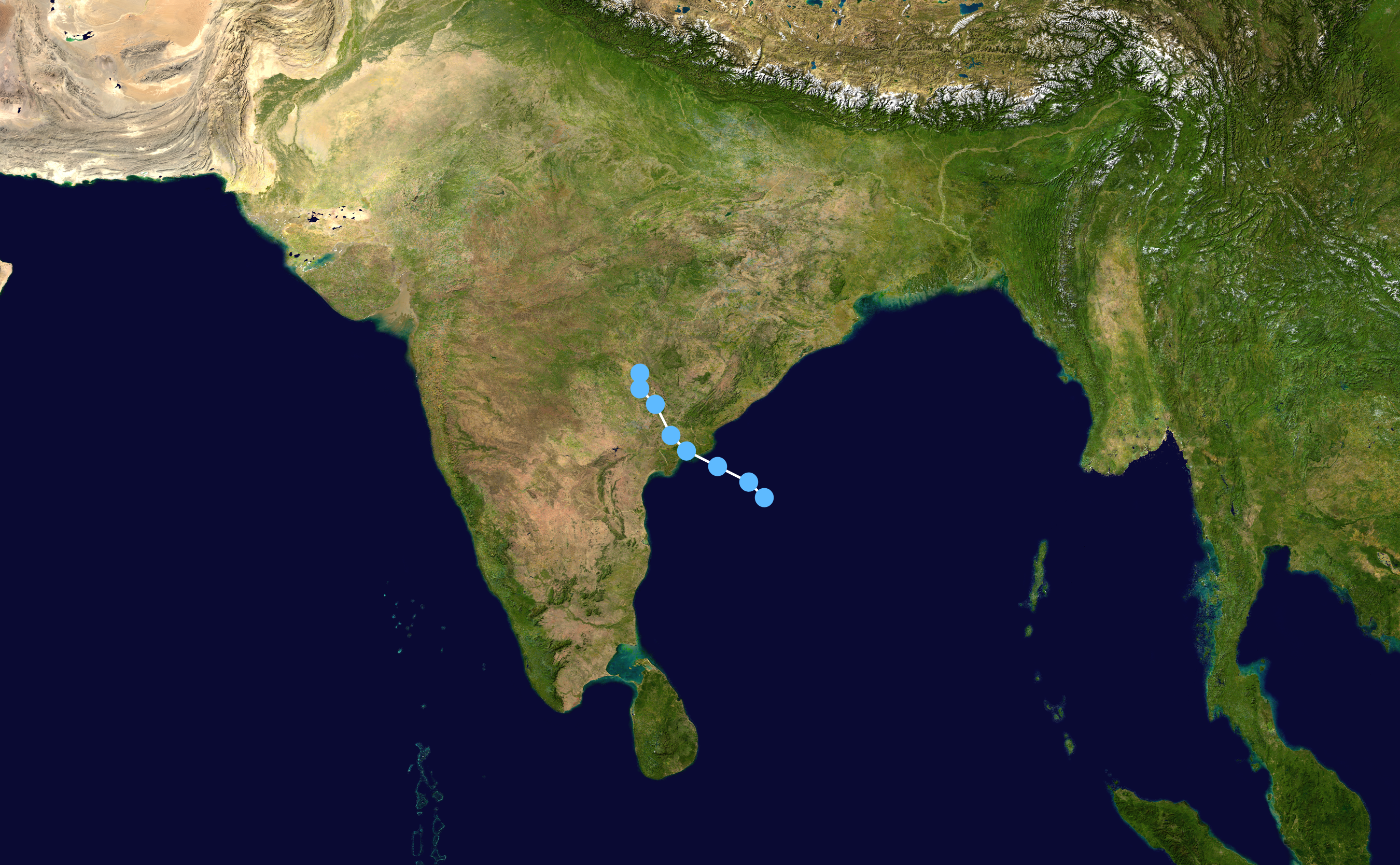
- Duration: September 21 – September 22
- Peak intensity: 45 km/h (30 mph) (3-min); 1000 hPa (mbar)

Depression BOB 05 developed in the Bay of Bengal on September 21. It struck Andhra Pradesh and dissipated the following day.

=== Depression BOB 06 ===
- Depression (IMD)
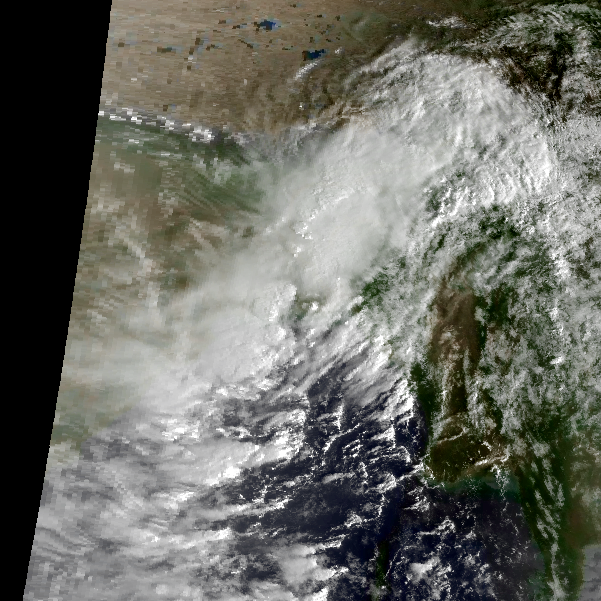
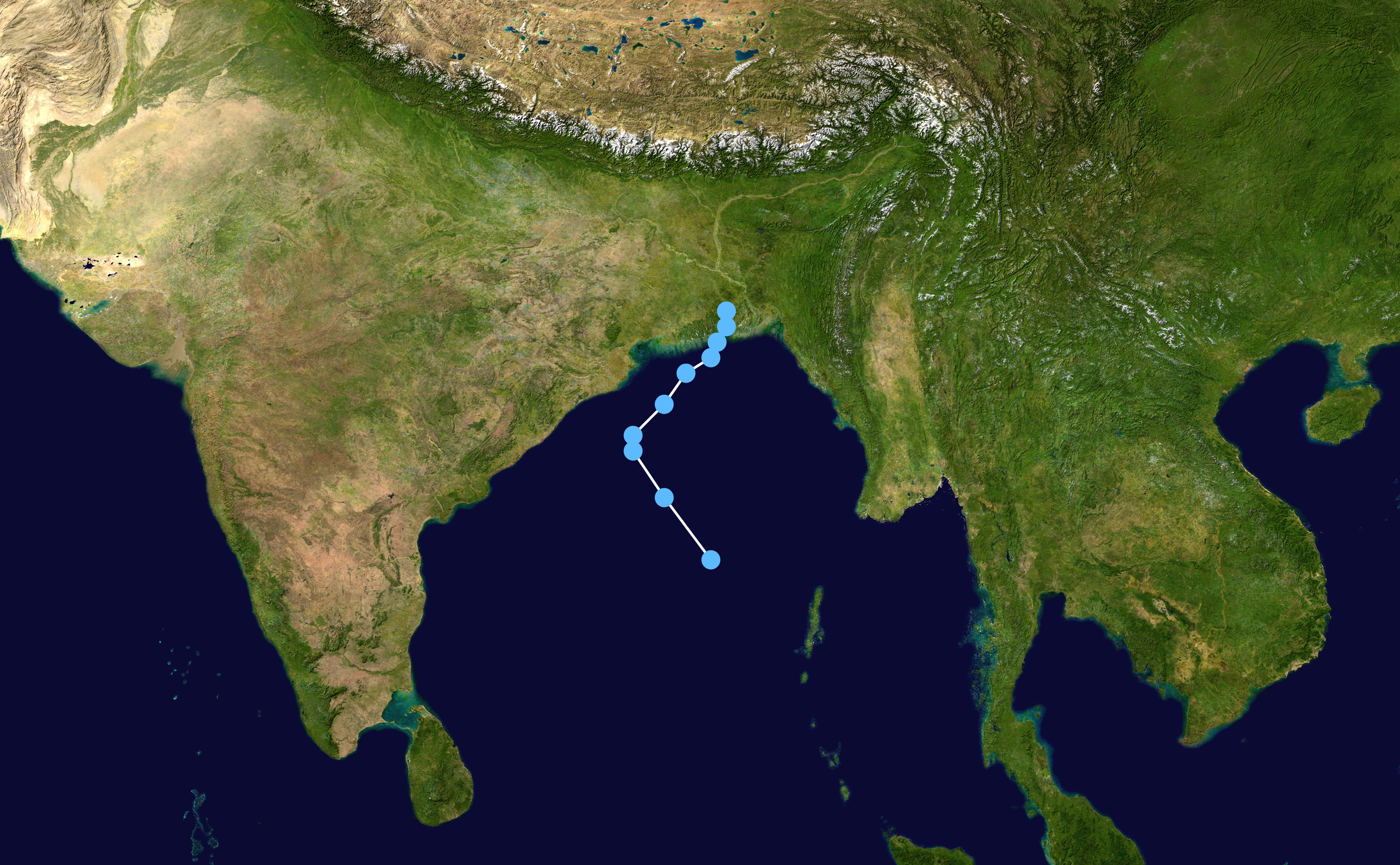
- Duration: October 12 – October 14
- Peak intensity: 45 km/h (30 mph) (3-min); 998 hPa (mbar)

Depression BOB 06 developed in the Bay of Bengal on October 12. It struck Bangladesh and dissipated on October 14.

=== Depression BOB 07 ===
- Depression (IMD)
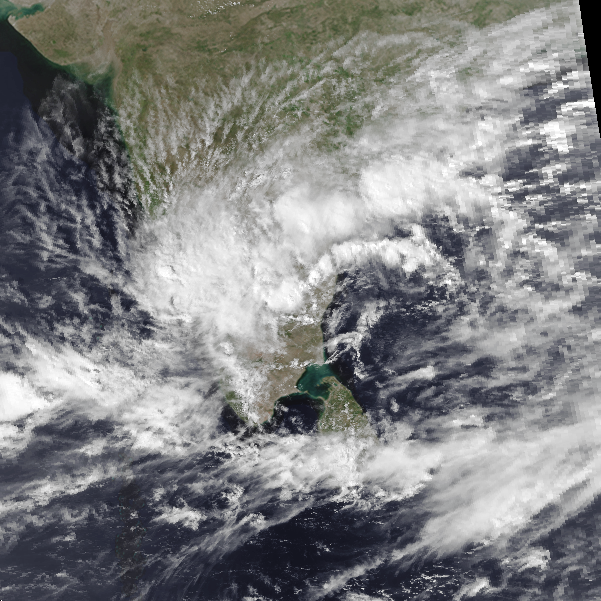
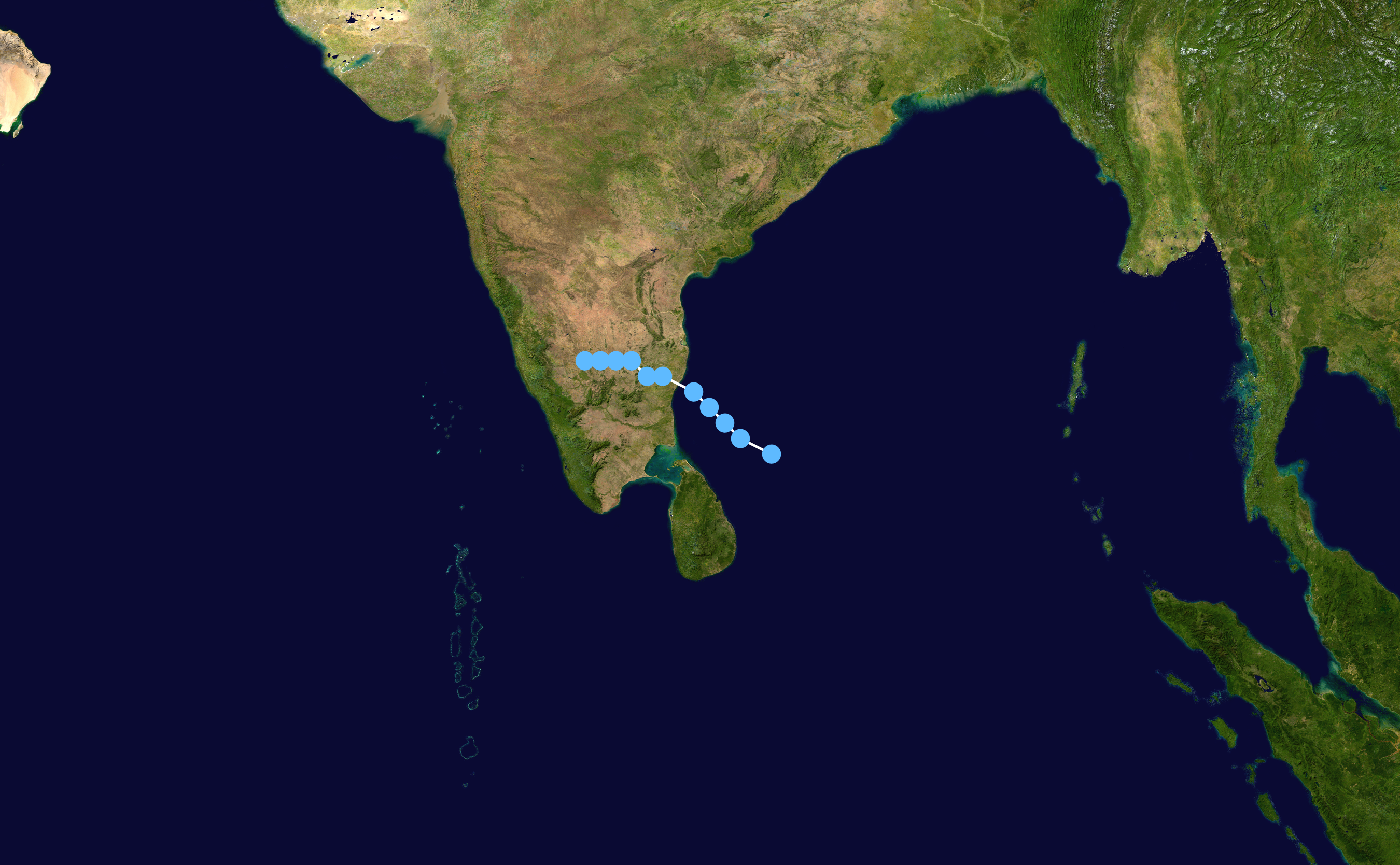
- Duration: October 28 – October 30
- Peak intensity: 45 km/h (30 mph) (3-min); 998 hPa (mbar)

Depression BOB 07 developed in the Bay of Bengal on October 28. It struck Tamil Nadu and dissipated on October 30.

=== Cyclonic Storm BOB 08 ===
- Cyclonic storm (IMD)
- Tropical storm (SSHWS)
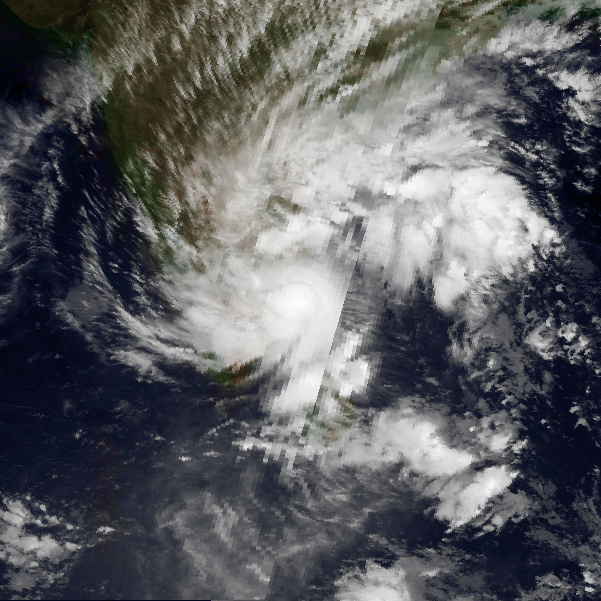
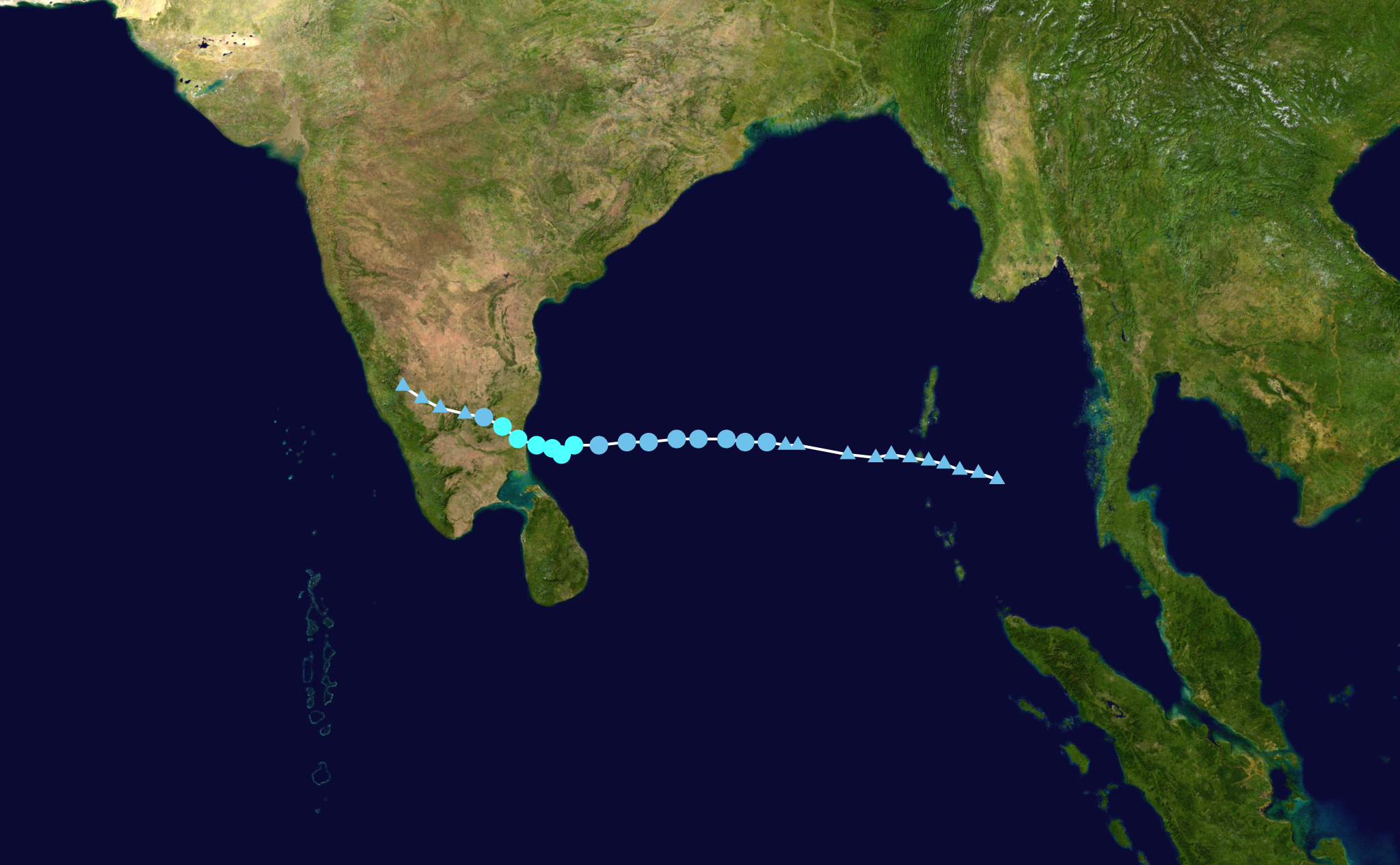
- Duration: November 9 – November 16
- Peak intensity: 85 km/h (50 mph) (3-min); 998 hPa (mbar)

The final storm of the season, which formed in the eastern Bay of Bengal on November 9, hit eastern India as a 45 mph tropical storm on the 15th. It dissipated the next day over the country.

The Cyclonic storm brought torrential rain and flash floods across southern India when it made landfall. Twenty-four-hour rainfall totaled 480 millimetres (19 in) at Karaikal. As a direct result of the flooding at least 40 people died.

=== Other systems ===
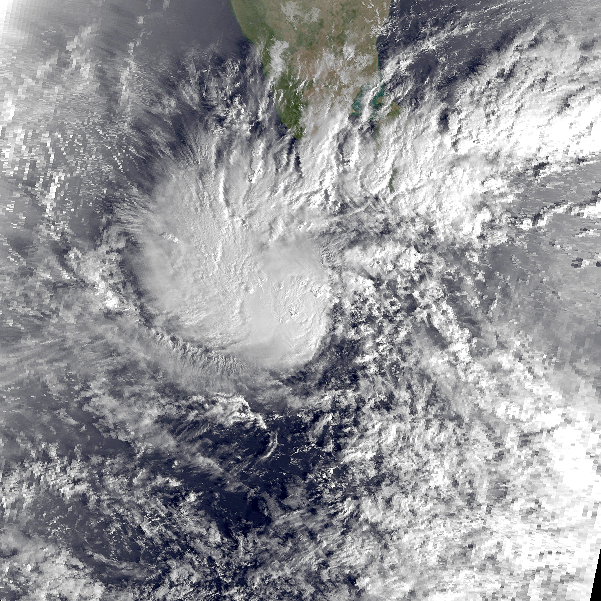
A possible near-equatorial tropical storm on 17 January

During January 14, the JTWC started to monitor an area of convection that had developed within the near equatorial trough of low pressure, about 900 km (560 mi) to the southeast of Colombo, Sri Lanka. Over the next couple of days the disturbance moved towards the northwest under the subtropical ridge of pressure, before early on January 17, the JTWC noticed a steady increase in deep convection and issued a Tropical Cyclone Formation Alert. Later that day the JTWC initiated advisories as the disturbance had intensified into a tropical storm and designated it as Cyclone 01A. As the Cyclone was suffering from being in an area of strong vertical wind shear it was not able to intensify past minimal tropical storm strength of 65 km/h, (40 mph). During the next couple of days, strong upper-level winds stripped deep convection away from the center with the JTWC downgrading the cyclone to a tropical depression early on January 19. The remaining low level circulation center slowly dissipated with the JTWC issuing their final advisory early the next day.

The cyclone posed a direct threat to Coalition forces, which were operating in the Arabian Sea, Persian Gulf and the Red Sea, in the buildup to the Gulf War. However it was not a significant factor in the buildup to the Gulf war and due to it low latitude track and weak intensity it had little effect on ships steaming to the Middle East. As a result of the cyclone remaining out to sea, there was no reported impact on land.

== Season effects ==
Name	Dates	Peak intensity			Areas affected	Damage (USD)	Deaths	Ref(s).
Name	Dates	Category	Wind speed	Pressure	Areas affected	Damage (USD)	Deaths	Ref(s).
BOB 01	April 22–30	Super Cyclonic Storm	240 km/h (150 mph)	920 hPa (27.17 inHg)	India, Bangladesh, Myanmar, Yunnan	$1.5 billion	138,866	
BOB 02	May 30 – June 3	Cyclonic Storm	85 km/h (55 mph)	990 hPa (29.23 inHg)	India, Bangladesh		None	
BOB 03	July 27–31	Deep Depression	55 km/h (35 mph)	984 hPa (29.06 inHg)	India			
BOB 04	August 21–26	Depression	45 km/h (30 mph)	992 hPa (29.29 inHg)	India			
BOB 05	September 21–22	Depression	45 km/h (30 mph)	1,000 hPa (29.53 inHg)	India			
BOB 06	October 12–14	Depression	45 km/h (30 mph)	998 hPa (29.47 inHg)	Bangladesh, India			
BOB 07	October 28–30	Depression	45 km/h (30 mph)	998 hPa (29.47 inHg)	India			
BOB 08	November 9–16	Cyclonic Storm	85 km/h (55 mph)	998 hPa (29.47 inHg)	India	Minimal	40	
Season aggregates
8 Systems	April 22 – November 16		240 km/h (150 mph)	920 hPa (27.17 inHg)		>$1.5 billion	138906	

== See also ==
- Tropical cyclones in 1991
- North Indian Ocean tropical cyclone
- 1991 Atlantic hurricane season
- 1991 Pacific hurricane season
- 1991 Pacific typhoon season
- South-West Indian Ocean cyclone season: 1990–91, 1991–92
- Australian region cyclone season: 1990–91, 1991–92
- South Pacific cyclone season: 1990–91, 1991–92
