= Typhoon Yunya (1991) =

Pacific typhoon in 1991

Typhoon Yunya (Diding)
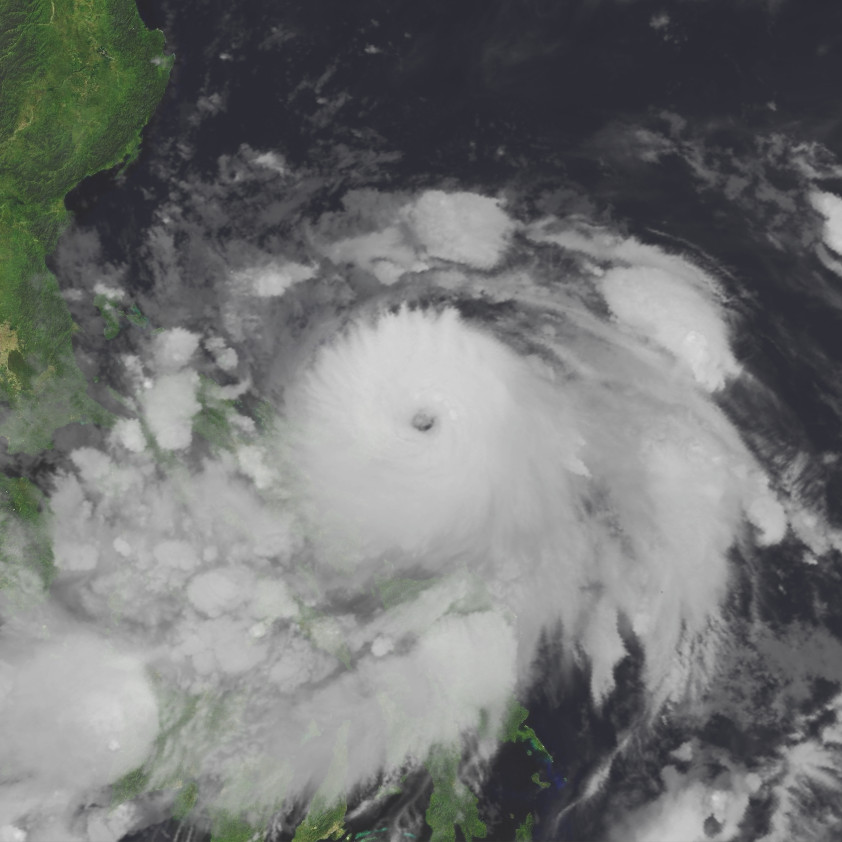
- Yunya as a Category 2 typhoon on June 13

Meteorological history
- Formed: June 11, 1991
- Dissipated: June 17, 1991

Typhoon
- 10-minute sustained (JMA)
- Highest winds: 150 km/h (90 mph)
- Lowest pressure: 950 hPa (mbar); 28.05 inHg

Category 3-equivalent typhoon
- 1-minute sustained (SSHWS/JTWC)
- Highest winds: 195 km/h (120 mph)

Overall effects
- Fatalities: 6 direct, 320 indirect
- Areas affected: Philippines, Taiwan
- IBTrACS
- Part of the 1991 Pacific typhoon season

Typhoon Yunya, known in the Philippines as Typhoon Diding, was a strong tropical cyclone whose landfall in the Philippines coincided with the 1991 eruption of Mount Pinatubo. A small tropical cyclone, Yunya rapidly developed from a tropical disturbance near East Samar on June 11. By June 13 the storm had reached typhoon status as it moved west-northwest near the Philippines. Yunya attained its peak intensity the following day with estimated winds of 145 km/h (90 mph); (Note: All winds are in ten-minute sustained standards unless otherwise implied by the agency.) however, strong wind shear soon impacted the typhoon and caused it to rapidly decay. The storm struck southern Luzon early on June 15 as a minimal typhoon before moving over the South China Sea later that day. After turning north and weakening to a tropical depression, the system brushed the southern tip of Taiwan on June 16 before dissipating the following day.

Across the Philippines, Yunya produced heavy rains that triggered significant flooding. Hundreds of homes and several bridges were washed away by swollen rivers. Six people were killed as a direct result of the storm, 2,013 homes were destroyed, and 24 others were damaged. Although the storm itself caused significant damage, the worst effects were related to the system's heavy rains mixing with volcanic ash from Mount Pinatubo, creating massive lahars that killed 320 people.

== Meteorological history ==
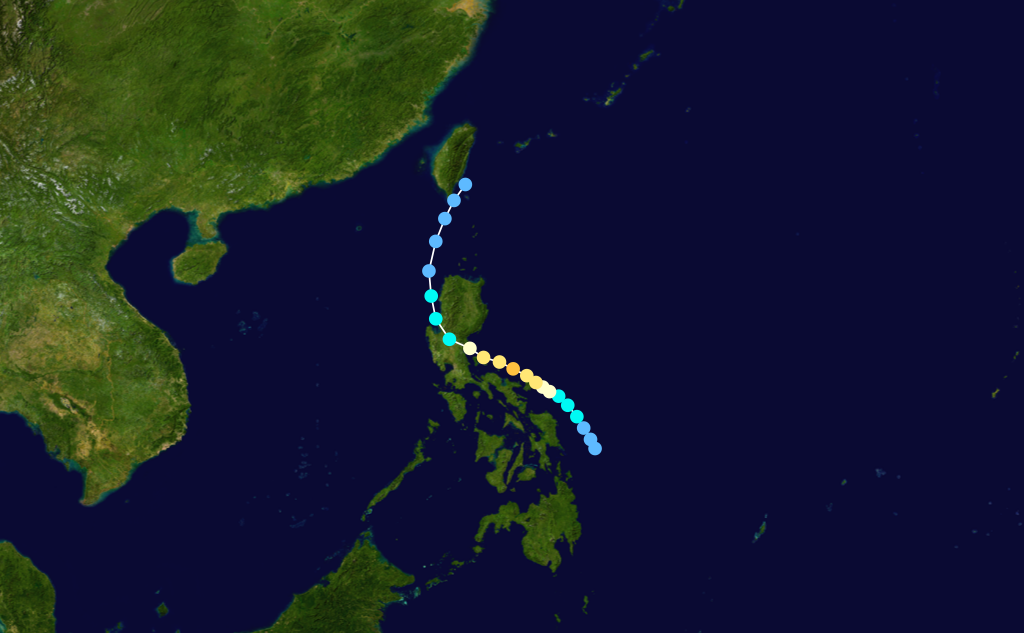
Map plotting the storm's track and intensity, according to the Saffir–Simpson scale Map key Saffir–Simpson scale Tropical depression (≤38 mph, ≤62 km/h) Tropical storm (39–73 mph, 63–118 km/h) Category 1 (74–95 mph, 119–153 km/h) Category 2 (96–110 mph, 154–177 km/h) Category 3 (111–129 mph, 178–208 km/h) Category 4 (130–156 mph, 209–251 km/h) Category 5 (≥157 mph, ≥252 km/h) Unknown Storm type Tropical cyclone Subtropical cyclone Extratropical cyclone, remnant low, tropical disturbance, or monsoon depression

On June 11, 1991, a tropical disturbance developed east of East Samar. Situated to the southwest of a tropical upper tropospheric trough, the system experienced low wind shear and gradually intensified as it moved northwestward. The following day, the Japan Meteorological Agency (JMA) began monitoring the system as a tropical depression. (Note: The Japan Meteorological Agency is the official Regional Specialized Meteorological Center for the western Pacific Ocean.) At 15:00 UTC on June 12, the Joint Typhoon Warning Center (JTWC) issued a Tropical Cyclone Formation Alert on the depression. (Note: The Joint Typhoon Warning Center is a joint United States Navy – United States Air Force task force that issues tropical cyclone warnings for the western Pacific Ocean and other regions.) Around this time, the storm began a period rapid development and a tiny central dense overcast formed. At 18:15 UTC, the USNS Spica sailed directly through the storm, measuring a barometric pressure of 989.5 mbar (hPa; 29.22 inHg) and peak winds of 110 km/h (70 mph). Although Yunya was already a tropical storm, the JTWC did not issue their first advisory on the system until early on June 13, at which time they assigned it the name Yunya.

Based on the measurements provided by the USNS Spica, the storm was analyzed as a midget cyclone with a gale diameter of 150 km (93 mi). Initially, the storm tracked northwestward at 20 km/h (10 mph). Throughout June 13, subsidence around the periphery of Yunya allowed the system to develop good outflow. As a result, the storm attained typhoon status later that day before strengthening slowed. By June 14, Yunya turned towards the west-northwest in response to a subtropical ridge to the north. Following this turn, the typhoon attained its peak intensity as a Category 3-equivalent typhoon on the Saffir–Simpson scale with winds estimated at 195 km/h (120 mph). Around the same time, the JMA assessed Yunya to have been slightly weaker, with peak winds estimated at 150 km/h (90 mph) along with a pressure of 950 mbar (950 hPa; 28 inHg). (Note: Wind estimates from the JMA and most other basins throughout the world are sustained over 10 minutes, while estimates from the United States-based Joint Typhoon Warning Center are sustained over 1 minute. 10-minute wind speeds are about 1.14 times the amount of 1-minute wind speeds.)

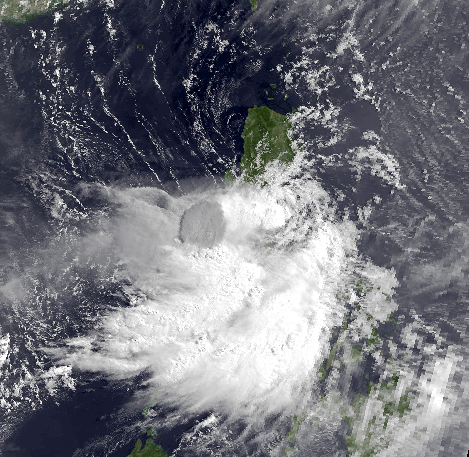
Satellite image of Yunya as it made landfall; the eruption column from Mount Pinatubo (in dark grey) can clearly be seen through the storm's clouds

Within hours of reaching its peak strength on June 14, strong wind shear associated with a second subtropical ridge over Asia impacted the typhoon. Due to the system's small size, the shear was able to disrupt the cyclone's core and cause rapid weakening as it approached southern Luzon. Around 00:00 UTC on June 15, Yunya made landfall just north of Dingalan Bay as a minimal typhoon and weakened to a tropical storm shortly thereafter. As the storm moved across Luzon, Mount Pinatubo, a volcano in the Zambales Mountains on the island's western side, was experiencing a major eruption—the second-largest to occur during the 20th century. Due to Yunya's circulation, the massive cloud of ash produced by the eruption was moistened and redistributed over the Philippines instead of blowing out to sea, greatly exacerbating the impact of the event.

Later on June 15, Yunya emerged into the South China Sea as a minimal tropical storm. Persistent wind shear prevented the system from strengthening and the storm ultimately degraded into a tropical depression by June 16. Having turned north within a break in the subtropical ridge, Yunya brushed the southern tip of Taiwan late on June 16 before dissipating the following day within the westerlies.

== Preparations and impact ==
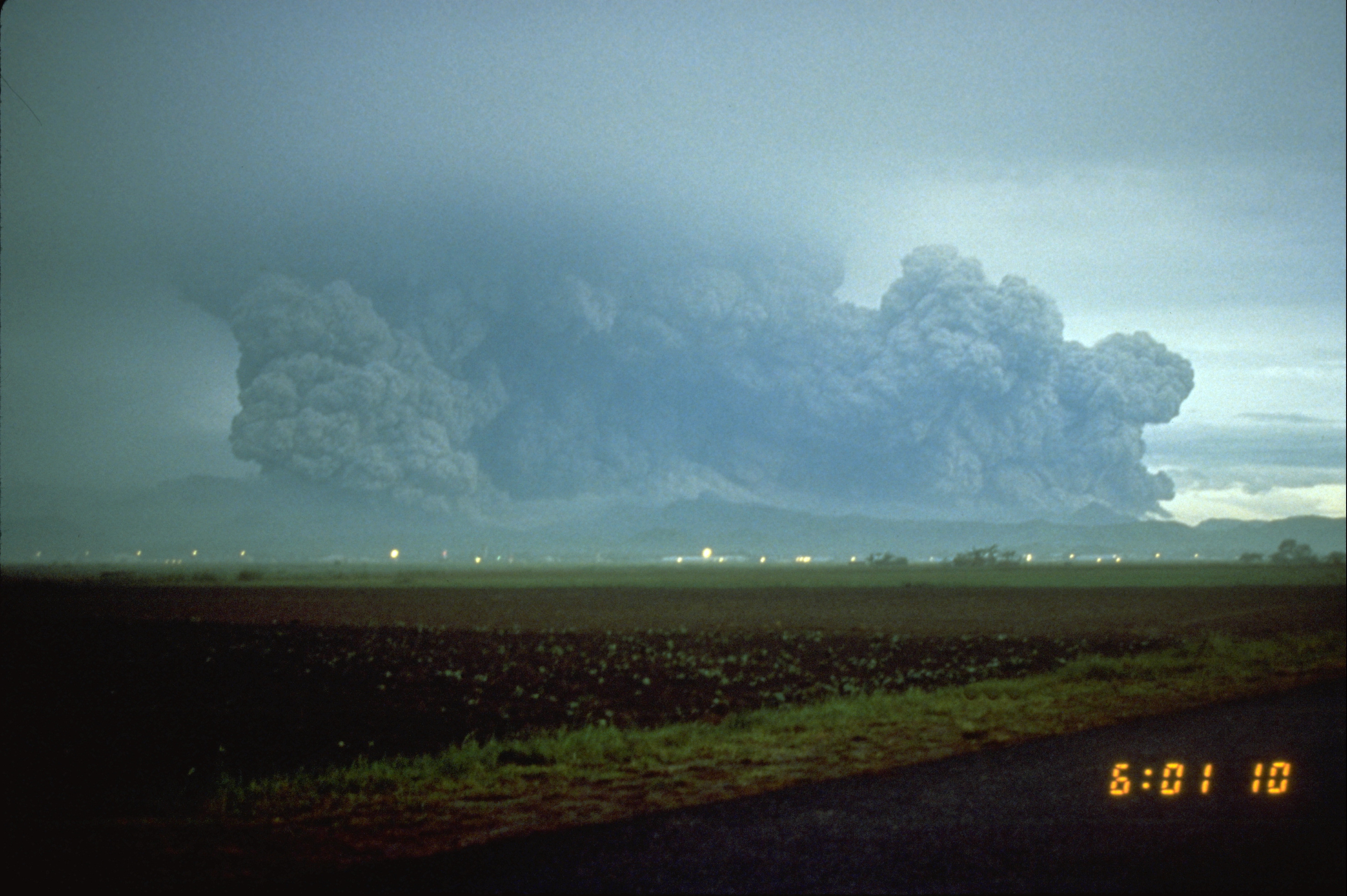
The colossal eruption of Mount Pinatubo on June 15, partially obscured by rainclouds from Yunya

On June 14, the Philippine Atmospheric, Geophysical and Astronomical Services Administration raised storm warnings in advance of Typhoon Yunya for much of Luzon and areas south of Manila. With Mount Pinatubo having already erupted once by this time, there were fears that the storm's heavy rains, combined with ash from the volcano, would create massive lahars capable of burying towns 40 km (25 mi) away from Pinatubo. As a result, 60,000 individuals were evacuated. Landslides on June 14 destroyed bridges in Santa Fe and homes in nearby Castillejos were washed away. By June 15, air-borne ash combined with the typhoon's rainfall, resulting in widespread travel disruptions and structural collapses. The mixture also made it appear as through it was nighttime during the middle of the day, prompting concern from residents. The wind from the typhoon carried ash within 160 km (100 mi) from Pinatubo, including to Manila, which prompted most of the airports in the country to close and Philippine Airlines to cancel all domestic and international flights through June 19. Low to mid-level winds and heavy rains from the storm contributed to widespread tephra falling over an area of 7,500 km^{2} (2,895 sq mi) of central and western Luzon. Heavy rains also resulted in lahars along mountains between the Gumain River to the Sacobia River and between Sacobia River to the O'Donnell River. These lahars inundated crops and homes, especially along the Abacan River. As a result of the lahars, some buildings and all bridges in Angeles City were destroyed. Moreover, 320 people were killed and 279 others were injured. The United States Geological Survey believes that the death toll from the lahars would have been far lower if not for Yunya.

In addition to the lahars, widespread flooding also took place in Luzon as rivers overtopped their banks. Elsewhere, a person was killed by debris in Manila. Across Olongapo City, power was knocked out, and one person was killed after the roof of a bus terminal collapsed under the weight of ash and rain. Two people died and three others were injured in an accident near Clark Air Base, where power was also knocked out. Along the Sacobia River in Pampanga, at least 170 homes were washed away due to the storm. The Abacan bridge spanning the Abacan River collapsed with a truck carrying three people, and an empty car. It is unknown whether the three people survived. Two people were killed and at least 12 warranted evacuation in Angeles City when the roof of a Philippine Rabbit Bus Lines-operated bus terminal collapsed, when 100 people were sheltering there to ride out the storm. Civil defense officials confirmed that five other bridges collapsed in Pampanga and Zambales provinces. All crops were destroyed throughout Iriga. Overall, 2,013 homes were destroyed and 24 others were damaged during the passage of the typhoon. A total of 2,035 families or 10,185 people were evacuated to shelters. Excluding from lahars, six people were killed by Yunya.

== See also ==
- Tropical cyclones in 1991
- Typhoon Mike (Ruping, 1990) – a destructive typhoon which was the most recent tropical system impact the Philippines prior to Yunya.
- Tropical Storm Thelma (Uring, 1991) – one of the deadliest tropical cyclones to hit the Philippines in recent recorded history; impacted the Philippines five months after Yunya.
- Typhoon Angela (Rosing, 1995) – a stronger and more damaging typhoon that crossed Luzon 4 years after Yunya.
- Typhoon Durian (Reming, 2006) – a typhoon which caused devastating lahar flows from the Mayon Volcano.
- Tropical Storm Fung-wong (Mario, 2014) – another tropical system that caused lahar flows from the Mayon Volcano.
- Typhoon Vongfong (Ambo, 2020) – a typhoon which took a relatively similar path to Yunya.
- Typhoon Noru (Karding, 2022) – a typhoon that rapid intensify into a super typhoon before it hit Luzon, also had a similar trajectory to Yunya.
- Typhoon Man-yi (Pepito, 2024) – a strong typhoon that severely affected Luzon and its nearby areas that were also affected by Yunya.
