= Typhoon Yuri =

Pacific typhoon in 1991

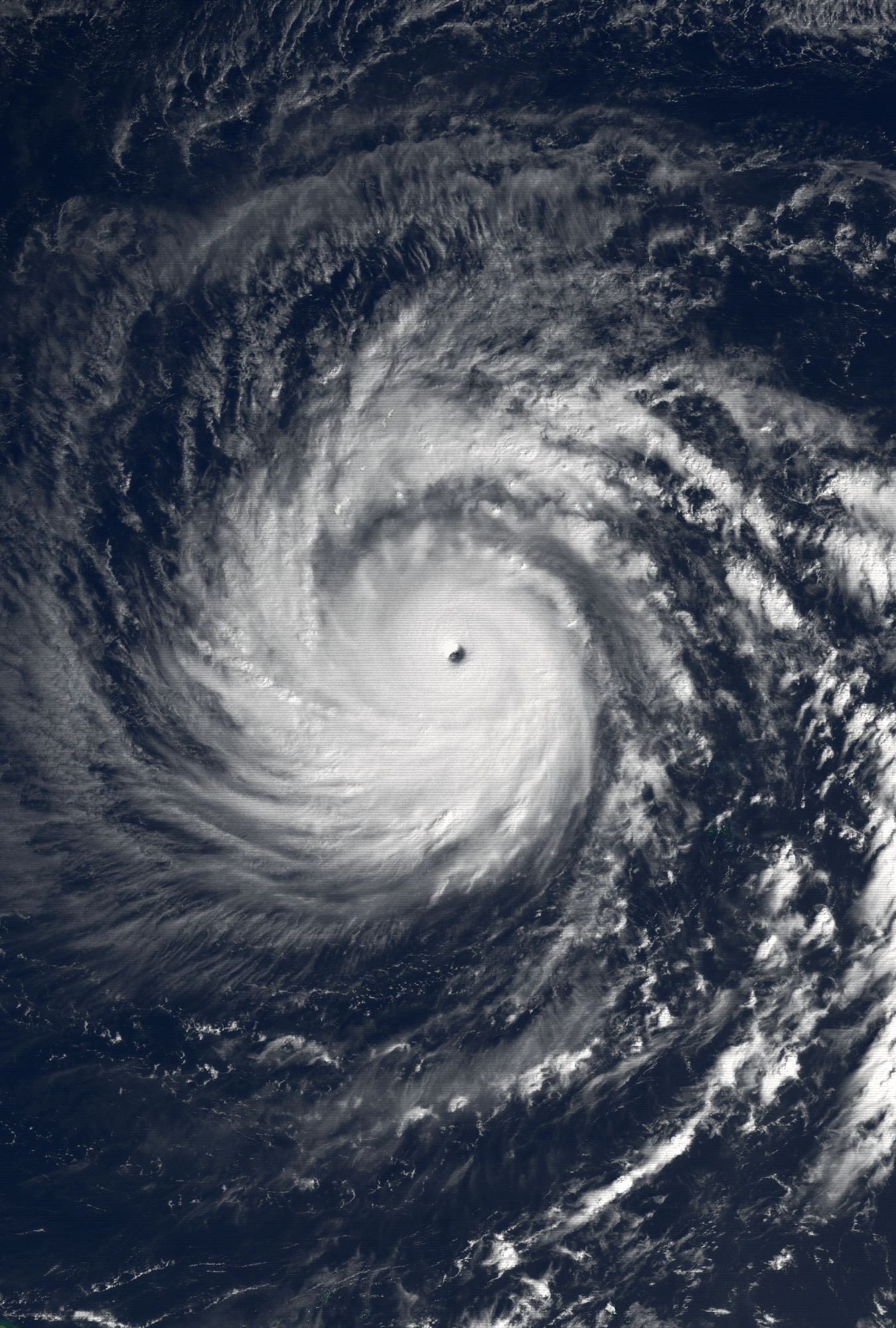
- Yuri near peak intensity on November 27

Meteorological history
- Formed: November 17, 1991
- Extratropical: December 1, 1991
- Dissipated: December 3, 1991

Violent typhoon
- 10-minute sustained (JMA)
- Highest winds: 220 km/h (140 mph)
- Lowest pressure: 895 hPa (mbar); 26.43 inHg

Category 5-equivalent super typhoon
- 1-minute sustained (SSHWS/JTWC)
- Highest winds: 280 km/h (175 mph)
- Lowest pressure: 885 hPa (mbar); 26.13 inHg

Overall effects
- Fatalities: None
- Damage: $36 million (1991 USD)
- Areas affected: Pohnpei, Guam
- IBTrACS
- Part of the 1991 Pacific typhoon season

Typhoon Yuri was the most intense tropical cyclone in 1991 in terms of minimum central pressure. The nineteenth typhoon and final super typhoon of the 1991 Pacific typhoon season, Yuri was a tropical disturbance that strengthened into a tropical depression on November 22 in the Philippine Sea. Moving rather slowly at first, the system continued to intensify, and was given the name Yuri. It had become a severe tropical storm about 1,480 kilometers east of Truk Island and took on a west-northwestward track at 22 km/h. Typhoon intensity was attained that night when Yuri was 1,050 km. Yuri turned more to the west on 26 November and reached peak intensity the following morning packing winds of over 220 km/h near its centre. Moving northwestwards at 30 km/h, Yuri passed 140 km to the south-southwest of Guam on the evening of November 27. After recurving November 29, Yuri accelerated northeastwards on November 30 and weakened to a severe tropical storm that night. By the morning of December 1, it had degenerated into a tropical storm about a few hundred kilometers east-northeast of Iwo Jima. Extratropical transition was completed soon afterward, and the storm's remnants persisted until December 3.

Although Yuri never directly made landfall, it still had managed to cause $3 million (1991 USD) in damage to Pohnpei, including the loss of a radio tower. In Guam, the storm caused extensive beach erosion and destroyed between 60 and 350 buildings. There, damage totaled $33 million (1991 USD). It is one of the most closely observed storms ever; its eye was studied for research.

== Meteorological history ==
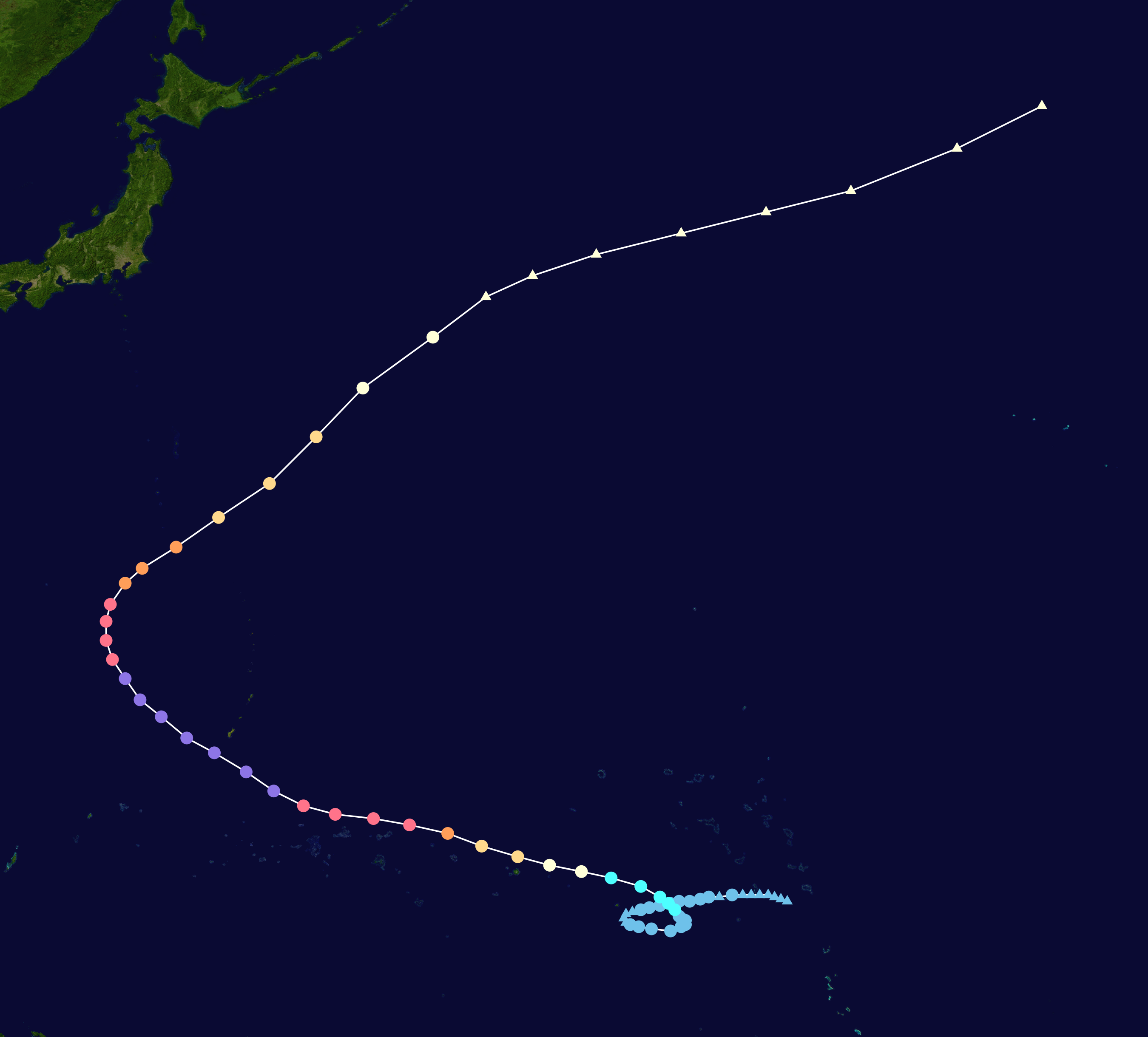
Map plotting the storm's track and intensity, according to the Saffir–Simpson scale Map key Saffir–Simpson scale Tropical depression (≤38 mph, ≤62 km/h) Tropical storm (39–73 mph, 63–118 km/h) Category 1 (74–95 mph, 119–153 km/h) Category 2 (96–110 mph, 154–177 km/h) Category 3 (111–129 mph, 178–208 km/h) Category 4 (130–156 mph, 209–251 km/h) Category 5 (≥157 mph, ≥252 km/h) Unknown Storm type Tropical cyclone Subtropical cyclone Extratropical cyclone, remnant low, tropical disturbance, or monsoon depression

In mid-November, the presence of low-level westerlies in the central Pacific provided suitable atmospheric conditions for tropical cyclogenesis. The rapid development of thunderstorm activity near the Marshall Islands on November 16 prompted the Joint Typhoon Warning Center (JTWC) to monitor the area for signs of development. The disturbance tracked slowly in a counter-clockwise loop over the next few days as it slowly organized, and at 0000 UTC on November 22, the Japan Meteorological Agency (JMA) classified the system as a tropical depression, with the JTWC following suit about a day later. Upon becoming classified as a tropical cyclone, the system underwent explosive intensification, reaching tropical storm strength based on the Dvorak technique on November 23. Yuri later reached typhoon intensity at 1200 UTC on November 24 located roughly 335 km (208 mi) east of Pohnpei while exhibiting an eye.

At 0540 UTC on November 25, Yuri passed 85 km (53 mi) north of Pohnpei with winds of 140 km/h (87 mph). During this time, the typhoon began a phase of unimpeded and steady intensification, contrary to most intense typhoons which typically strengthen dramatically in rapid deepening. Concurrently, Yuri expanded in size, reaching a maximum diameter of 600 km (370 mi) at one point. At 0000 UTC on November 27, the JMA assessed the storm to have reached its peak intensity with 10-minute maximum sustained winds of 220 km/h (140 mph) and a minimum barometric pressure of 895 mbar (895 hPa; 26.4 inHg). The JTWC analyzed winds at this time to have been equivalent to a Category 5 major hurricane on the Saffir–Simpson scale (SSHS).

Rounding the western periphery of a subtropical ridge, Yuri began to take a more northerly course, bringing it within 100 km (62 mi) of Guam on November 27 as a strong typhoon. After passing south of the island, the typhoon weakened but continued to grow in size, reaching an estimated 900 km (560 mi) in diameter upon clearing the Northern Mariana Islands. After recurving towards the northeast the storm accelerated and began transitioning into an extratropical cyclone. Yuri weakened below typhoon status early on December 1 shortly before completing the transition. The remnants restrengthened to a powerful hurricane-force cyclone due to baroclinic processes. Continuing to track northward, they were last noted on December 3.

== Impact ==
=== Pohnpei ===
On Pohnpei, the storm had caused a loss of a radio tower. The total damage on the island of Pohnpei totaled $3 million (1991 USD).

=== Guam ===
On the United States territory of Guam, the large yet particularly dangerous and destructive tropical cyclone passed this western Pacific island on November 27. The storm brought wind gusts of up to 115 mph to the territory. The storm caused 2,500 people into shelters. The storm also produced high waves as tall as a two-story building to the Guam shoreline. The storm also managed to dump 4 inches of rain on the Territory. As civil defense and other workers tried to recover from the 24-foot waves and 115 mph winds of Typhoon Yuri, about three-quarters of Guam remained without electricity on November 28. But Guam was spared the full brunt of Yuri. It missed the island by 50 miles. No deaths were reported from the storm.

Nearly all of Guam (ninety percent of the 133,000 residents) remained without water and electricity on November 29, nearly two days after the powerful tropical cyclone passed Guam. 2,500 of the residents that took shelters were crammed into 12 school shelters on November 28.

Overall, the storm caused the area $33 million (1991 USD).

== See also ==
- List of Equatorial tropical cyclones
- Other strong typhoons in the East Philippine Sea that had similar trajectories to Yuri:
  - Typhoon Pongsona (2002)
  - Typhoon Yagi (2006)
  - Typhoon Lekima (2013)
  - Typhoon Dolphin (2015)
