= Cargo Preference Act =

Legislation for marine transport of cargo

The Cargo Preference Act or Cargo Preference refers generally to legal requirements for the carriage of government-impelled cargoes on the vessels flagged within the registry of that government for the purpose of promoting a national merchant marine. Cargo Preference is commonplace among the world's seafaring nations, including Australia, Brazil, France, Japan, Taiwan.

== Cargo Preference in the United States ==
United States law includes two main pieces of Cargo Preference legislation: The Cargo Preference Act of 1954 (the "1954 Act") pertaining to the carriage of civilian cargoes and the Military Cargo Preference Act of 1904 (the "1904 Act"), which governs military cargoes.

Cargo preference is administered by the United States Maritime Administration ("MARAD"). Originally, MARAD provided advice to shipper agencies, without being able to compel compliance. Finding the arrangement unsatisfactory, Congress passed the Merchant Marine Act of 1970, Pub. L. No. 91-469, which authorized MARAD to issue regulations governing cargo preference shipments by the other agencies. Section 27 of the 1970 Act added explicit cargo preference authority, which was amended in 2008 to provide MARAD with the authority to (a) "direct agencies to require the transportation in United States-flagged vessels of cargo shipments not otherwise subject to [Cargo Preference] in equivalent amounts to cargo determined to have been shipped on foreign carriers in violation of [Cargo Preference]" and (b) "impose on any person that violates [the Cargo Preference Act or a MARAD implementing regulation], a civil penalty of not more than $25,000 for each violation willfully and knowingly committed, with each day of a continuing violation following the date of shipment to be a separate violation." Although cargo preference contains exceptions where U.S.-flag vessels are unavailable, as discussed infra, shipper agencies may determine non-availability only with MARAD concurrence.

=== 1904 Act ===
The 1904 Act requires that 100% of cargoes "bought for the Army, Navy, Air Force, or Marine Corps" be carried on board U.S.-flag vessels. Charges for such transportation are limited to "charges made for transporting like goods for private persons" and where the Government finds that such charges are "excessive or unreasonable" it may contract for such transportation as otherwise provided by law.

=== 1954 Act ===
The 1954 Act amended the Merchant Marine Act of 1936, P.L. to incorporate a new section 901(b) to require U.S.-flag vessel participation in the carriage of United States Government impelled cargoes. The 1954 Act requires that 50% of the volume of government-impelled cargoes be transported in privately owned U.S.-registered vessels, but only to the extent that such vessels are reasonably available at fair and reasonable rates.

=== Purpose of Cargo Preference ===
Throughout its history, the United States has depended upon a viable merchant marine for its economic and military national security. During two wars, the United States Government found itself unable to respond to pressing economic and military needs, and therefore built a legal framework to fortify the merchant marine as a bulwark against future failures. The purpose of Cargo Preference is encapsulated in the opening section of the Merchant Marine Act of 1936:

It is necessary for the national defense and development of its foreign and domestic commerce that the United States shall have a merchant marine (A) sufficient to carry its domestic water-borne commerce and a substantial portion of the water-borne export and foreign commerce of the United States and to provide shipping service on all routes essential for maintaining the flow of such domestic and foreign water-borne commerce at all times, (B) capable of serving as a naval and military auxiliary in time of war or national emergency, (C) owned and operated under the United States Flag by citizens of the United States insofar as may be practicable, and (D) composed of the best-equipped, safest, and most suitable types of vessels, constructed in the United States and manned with a trained and efficient citizen personnel.

Thus, the merchant marine is intended to provide national security, firstly by supporting U.S. commerce, and secondly by providing sealift capacity for use in wars or in emergencies such as the recent Katrina disaster. This is further delineated by National Security Directive 28, issued by the White House in 1989, which still governs sealift policy. It states that:

Sealift is essential both to executing this country's forward defense strategy and to maintaining a wartime economy. The United States' national sealift objective is to ensure that sufficient military and civil maritime resources will be available to meet defense deployment, and essential economic requirements in support of our national security strategy. . . . In coordination with the Department of Defense, the Department of Transportation will determine the capacity of our merchant marine industries to support essential industrial activity during wartime.

The United States also maintains a merchant marine for purposes of national independence and pride. As then-Senator Barack Obama stated in 2008:

A strong U.S.-flag commercial fleet needs our nation's cargo preference laws. Whether it is carrying needed goods to those overseas in distress or moving government-generated cargo, American mariners aboard American ships make sure the job is done. People around the world look to the U.S. flag as a symbol of hope and determination. Ships flying Old Glory with American crews are important icons of our resolve.

The Government Accountability Office (formerly the General Accounting Office) and economists Nathan Associates and Promar International have conducted studies which determined that Cargo Preference is essential to the maintenance of the U.S. Merchant Marine. In 2008, preference cargoes accounted for 49.6 percent of all cargo carried by the U.S.-flag merchant fleet.

The U.S. fleet depends upon Cargo Preference because U.S. laws, regulations, and taxes place it at a competitive disadvantage relative to so-called "Open Register" or "Flag of Convenience" ("FOC") fleets, from nations such as Panama, the Bahamas, and Liberia, which impose minimal tax and regulatory burdens. Additionally, many of the fleets competing on the high seas enjoy high levels of State participation and subsidy, such as the China Ocean Shipping Company, now one of the world's largest liner shipping companies.

==== Cargo Preference and Food Aid ====
As a civilian agency government-impelled cargo, U.S. humanitarian assistance shipped overseas as food aid is subject to the 50% requirement of the 1954 Cargo Preference Act. This was then increased to 75% in 1985.

Maritime interests, including USA Maritime strongly support cargo preference. Opponents of Cargo Preference have argued that it slows transit times for government-impelled cargo, increases shipping costs, and potentially reduces the volume of food aid available. Various supporters of cargo preference have opined that the support from maritime and other stakeholders in the program support the food aid budget thereby increasing food and other resources available to the programs.

GAO has reported that cargo preference laws "have a significant impact on the U.S. Merchant marine industry. GAO measured this impact by estimating that, in the absence of preference cargo, the equivalent of between 61 and 68 percent, by tonnage, of the 165 U.S.-flag vessels engaged in international trade would leave the U.S. fleet." Another GAO report found that shipments of food aid on U.S.-flag vessels did little to meet the law’s objective of helping to maintain a U.S. merchant marine and those cargo preference requirements adversely affected operations of the food aid programs, chiefly by raising the cost of ocean transportation and reducing the volume of commodities that can be shipped.

A 2015 US Maritime Administration report found that the US Merchant Marine has suffered severe losses in recent years—23% since 2010—chiefly due to the loss of preference cargoes. MARAD also reported that US humanitarian assistance cargoes are the greatest source of preference cargo—over half of all dry cargoes shipped by government agencies since 2002. MARAD further found that since 2000, the US fleet has shrunk dramatically as US food aid cargoes plummeted 77% even though DOD cargoes increased by 60% during the same period.

Food aid program stakeholders, including maritime and agricultural interests, advocate in favor of food aid every year during the U.S. budget process, helping keep the United States Food for Peace program the leading source of humanitarian aid globally. Andrew Natsios, former USAID Administrator, cautioned that when the Europeans uncoupled food aid from their constituents, the overall budget line decreased significantly: "Relying on cash food aid will not work," he said. "Look at the numbers from Europe: After the Commission and member states began moving to cash, their contributions fell by 40 percent." However, Natsios testified before Congress that "in the last ten years, the US government, through the Food for Peace program, has spent more on transporting, storing, and distributing the food to other regions of the world than on the food itself." He argued that reforms need to be implemented and said "no other industry benefits more from current US food aid policy than the U.S. flagged shipping industry, which is probably why they are the strongest opponents to reform."

In 2011, General Duncan McNabb, Commander, U.S. Transportation Command, stated "The movement of international food aid has been a major contributor to the cargo we have moved under the cargo preference law that our commercial sealift industry depends upon. Any reductions will have to be offset in other ways to maintain current DOD sealift readiness."
