= 1990–91 South-West Indian Ocean cyclone season =

Cyclone season in the Southwest Indian Ocean

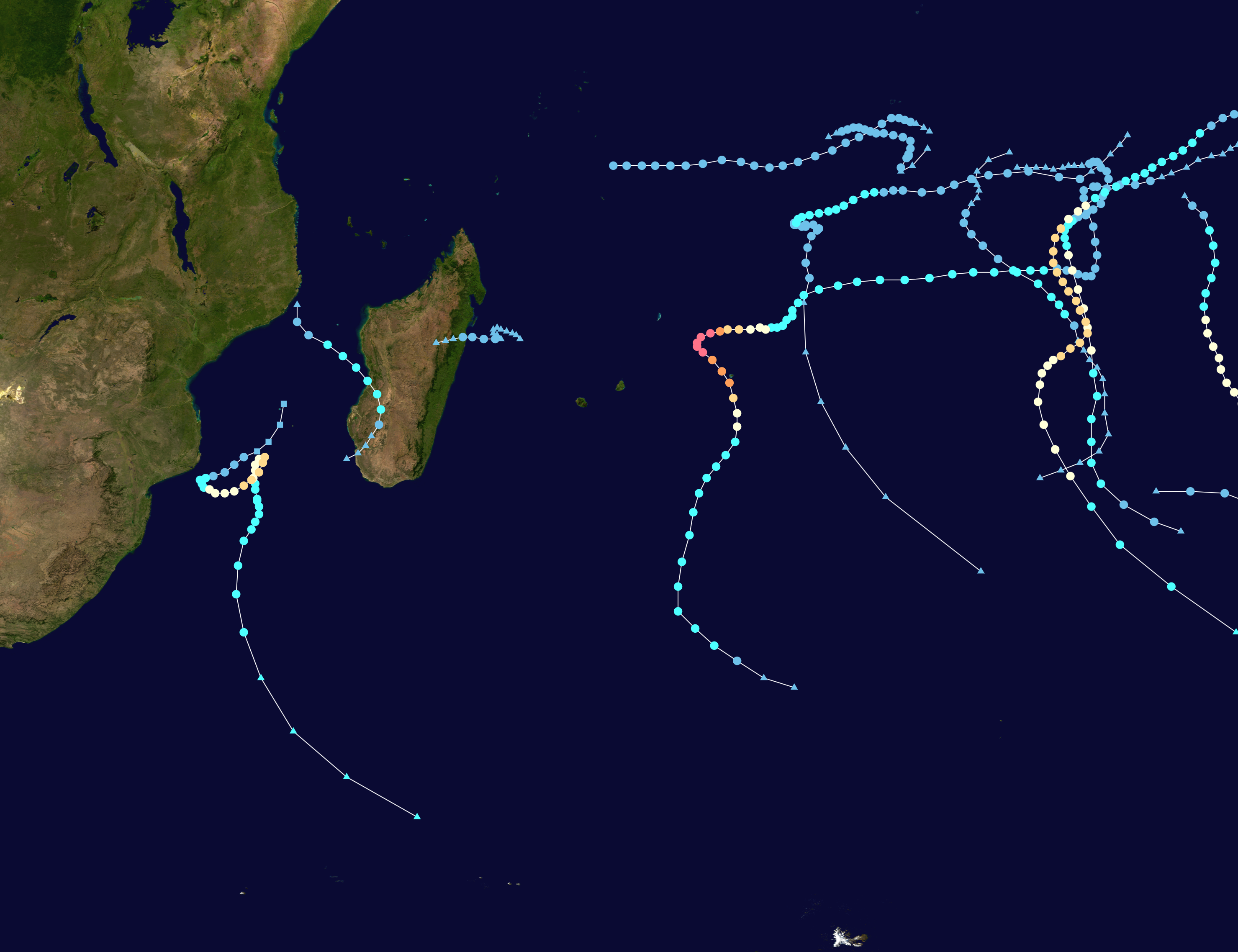
- Season summary map

Seasonal boundaries
- First system formed: September 21, 1990
- Last system dissipated: June 16, 1991

Strongest storm
- Name: Bella
  - Maximum winds: 215 km/h (130 mph) (10-minute sustained)
  - Lowest pressure: 915 hPa (mbar)

Seasonal statistics
- Total disturbances: 11
- Total depressions: 11
- Total storms: 7
- Tropical cyclones: 3
- Total fatalities: 88
- Total damage: Unknown

Related articles
- 1990–91 Australian region cyclone season; 1990–91 South Pacific cyclone season

The 1990–91 South-West Indian Ocean cyclone season was fairly quiet, although activity began early and the final named storm formed at a record late date. There were seven named storms classified by the Météo-France office (MFR) on Réunion, as well as three depressions; an additional depression was classified by the Joint Typhoon Warning Center (JTWC), an unofficial warning agency. The JTWC tracked storms in both September and October, although neither affected land. In late November, another short-lived depression formed in the northeastern portion of the basin. Activity remained minimal until January, when Tropical Storm Alison formed in the eastern portion of the basin. Later in the month, Cyclone Bella became the strongest storm of the season, reaching 10‑minute maximum sustained winds of 155 km/h (96 mph). It passed near the island of Rodrigues, becoming the worst cyclone there in 20 years and killing half of the population of one endangered species. Bella also likely caused a cargo ship to go missing with 36 people on board. Three storms developed in short succession in the second half of February. Cyclone Cynthia developed rapidly in the Mozambique Channel on February 16 and struck western Madagascar, killing 36 people and ruining local rice harvests. A residual trough after Cynthia dissipated spawned Tropical Storm Debra, which looped in the Mozambique Channel. Toward the end of the month, Tropical Storm Elma exited the basin into the adjacent Australian region, only to re-enter the south-west Indian Ocean and dissipate. Long-lived Cyclone Fatima originated in the Australian basin in late March and changed directions before becoming extratropical. On April 2, a tropical depression struck eastern Madagascar, killing 18 people. The final storm, Gritelle, was named on June 10, the latest on record.

== Seasonal summary ==
During the season, the Météo-France office (MFR) on Réunion island issued warnings in tropical cyclones within the basin. The agency estimated intensity through the Dvorak technique, and warned on tropical cyclones in the region from the coast of Africa to 90° E, south of the equator. Beginning in November 1990, MFR utilized a high resolution picture transmission station in conjunction with its satellite imagery. This allowed for improved Dvorak ratings, allowing for zooming and adjusting the satellite pictures. The Joint Typhoon Warning Center (JTWC), which is a joint United States Navy – United States Air Force task force, also issued tropical cyclone warnings for the southwestern Indian Ocean. In addition to the named storms, the MFR also tracked four tropical depressions, named A1, A2, A3, and G1.

In general, the monsoon was weaker than normal within the basin, which provided less flow across the equator to spawn tropical cyclones. As a result, there was a marked decrease in overall activity compared to the 1989–90 season. The MFR issued 198 cyclone bulletins during the season, a 40% decrease over the previous year. Many of the storms formed at the edge of satellite coverage.

== Systems ==
=== Tropical Depression A2 ===
- Tropical depression (MFR)
- Tropical storm (SSHWS)
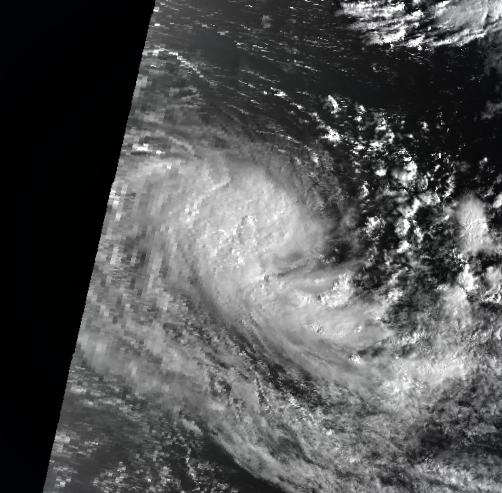
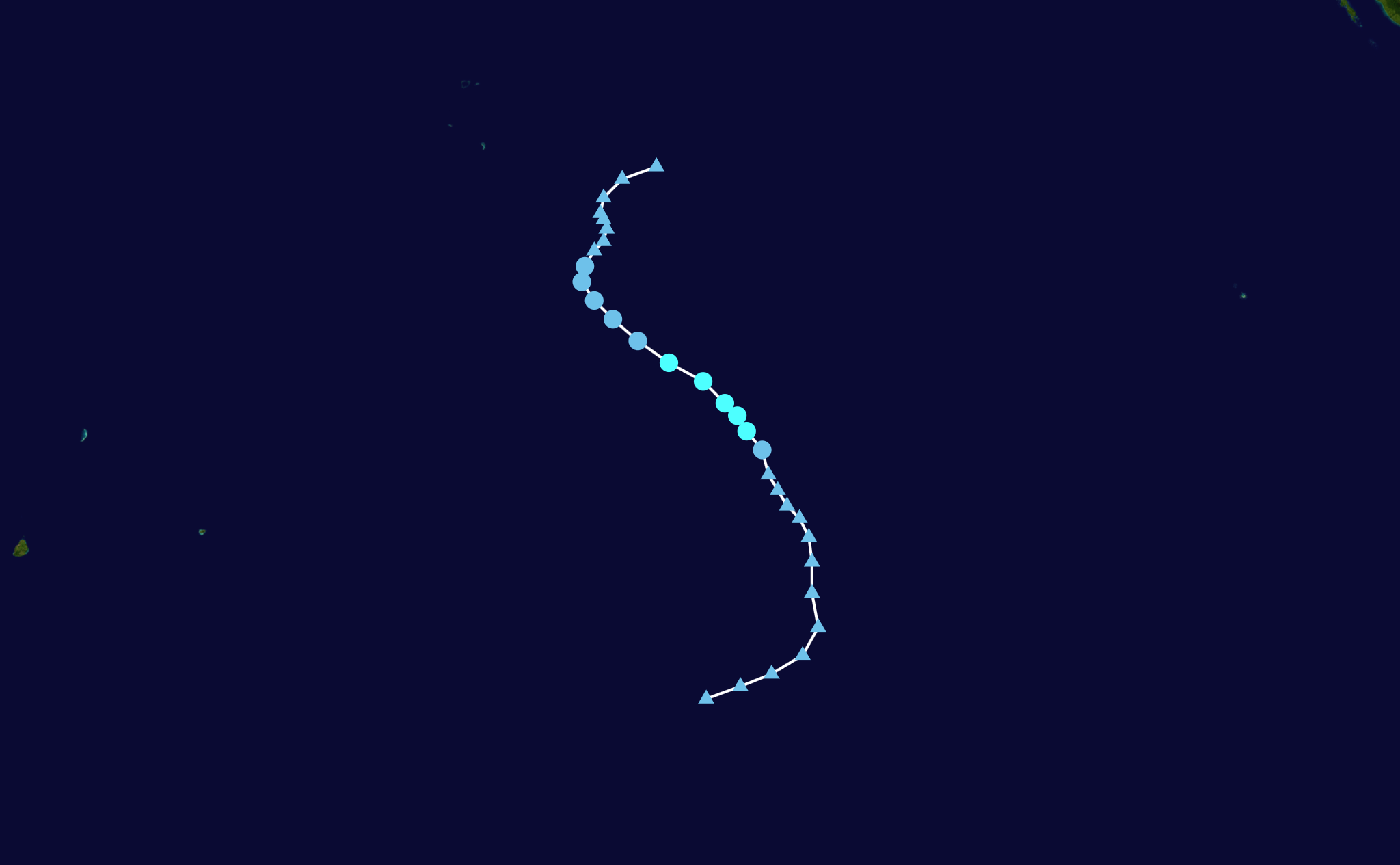
- Duration: December 1 – December 4
- Peak intensity: 55 km/h (35 mph) (10-min); 997 hPa (mbar)

On November 29, the JTWC tracked a system to the east-southeast of Diego Garcia, which originated in the monsoon trough. The system moved to the southwest and was classified by MFR as Tropical Disturbance A2 on November 30. On December 2, the disturbance intensified into a tropical depression as it curved to the southeast. On that day, the MFR estimated peak winds of 55 km/h (34 mph), based on the distinct appearance on satellite imagery. On the next day, the JTWC classified the system as Tropical Cyclone 04S, and assessed the storm as intensifying to a peak of 100 km/h (62 mph); the intensification was aided by an anticyclone aloft. However, an increase in wind shear caused marked weakening. The JTWC discontinued advisories on December 4, although the MFR continued tracking the system until December 7, when the depression had curved back to the southwest for a final time.

=== Severe Tropical Storm Alison ===
- Severe tropical storm (MFR)
- Category 1 tropical cyclone (SSHWS)
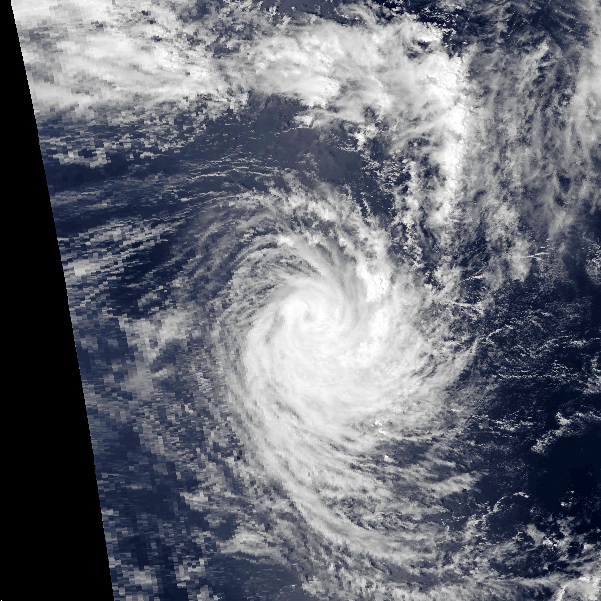
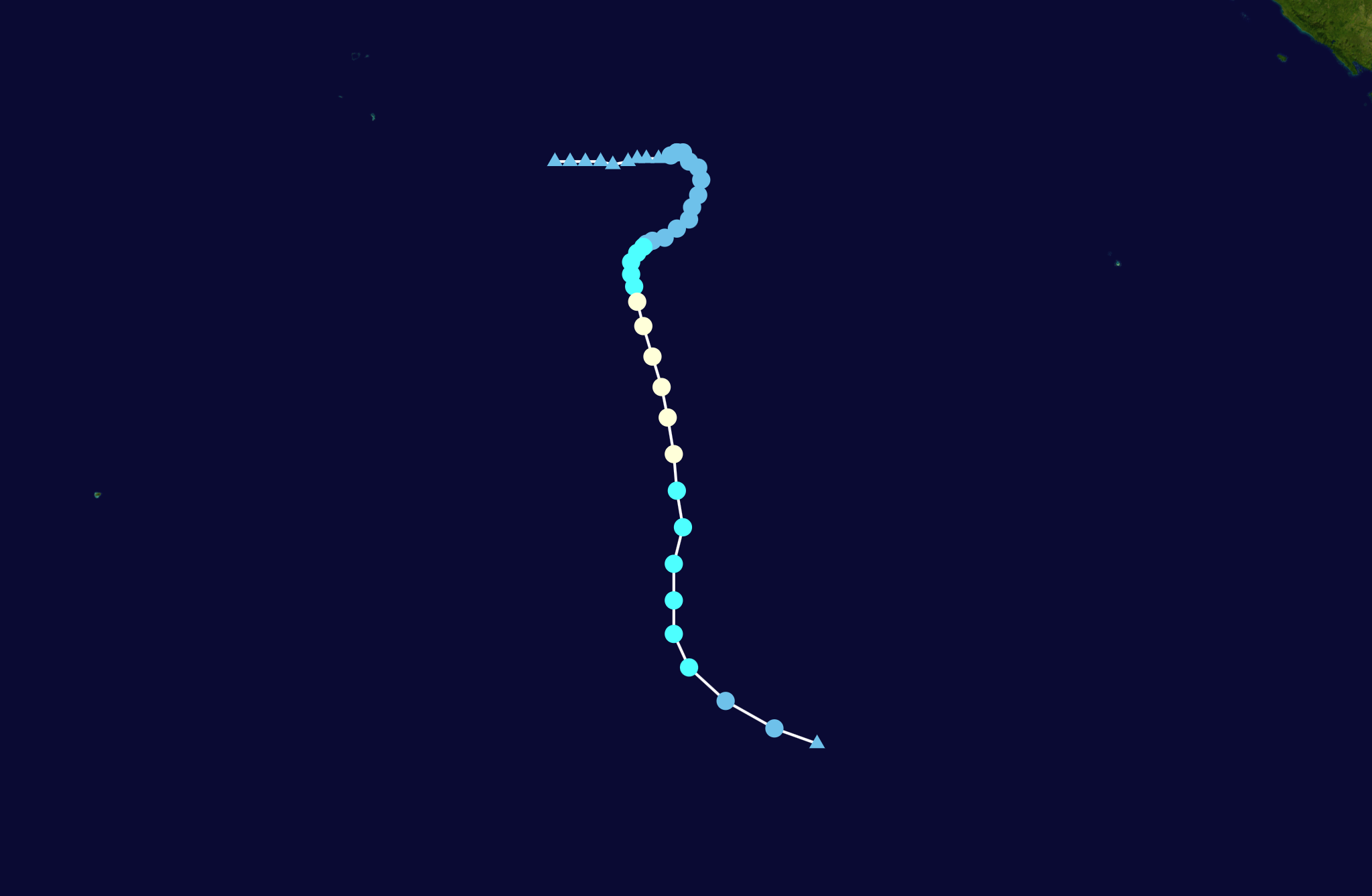
- Duration: January 8 – January 18
- Peak intensity: 115 km/h (70 mph) (10-min); 966 hPa (mbar)

A southward-moving anticyclone influenced the monsoon trough to spawn a tropical disturbance on January 8, located east of Diego Garcia. The system moved to the east without much organization, turning to the southwest on January 11 around a ridge. On the next day, the JTWC classified the system as Tropical Cyclone 07S, the same day that the MFR upgraded the depression to Tropical Storm Alison. Conditions favored further strengthening, and Alison gradually intensified to peak 10‑minute sustained winds of 115 km/h (71 mph) on January 15, according to the MFR. On the same date, the JTWC assessed peak 1‑minute winds of 120 km/h (75 mph), equivalent to a minimal hurricane. By that time, the storm had turned more to the south-southeast, and began to weaken on January 16. Two days later, Alison weakened to tropical depression status and dissipated.

=== Tropical Cyclone Bella ===
- Intense tropical cyclone (MFR)
- Category 4 tropical cyclone (SSHWS)
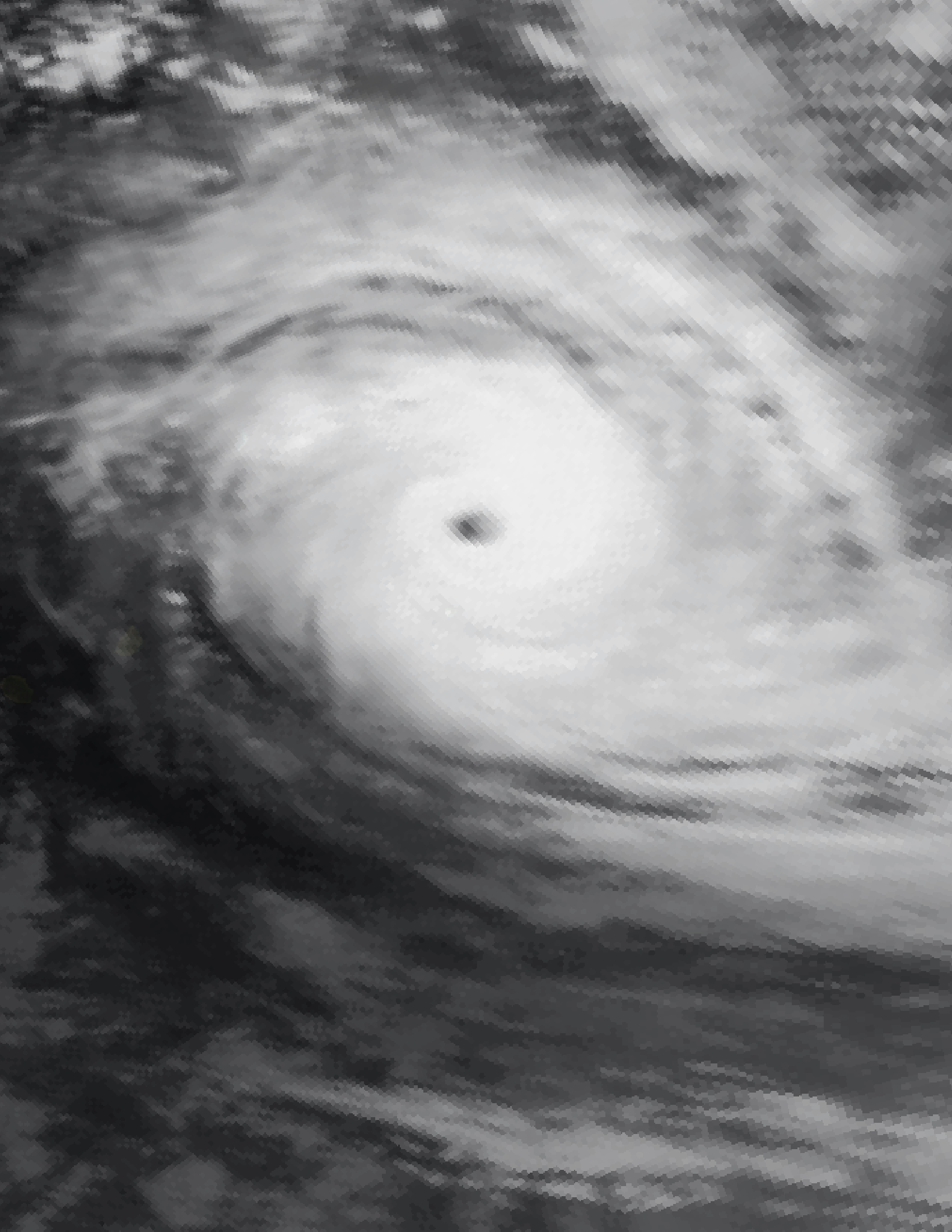
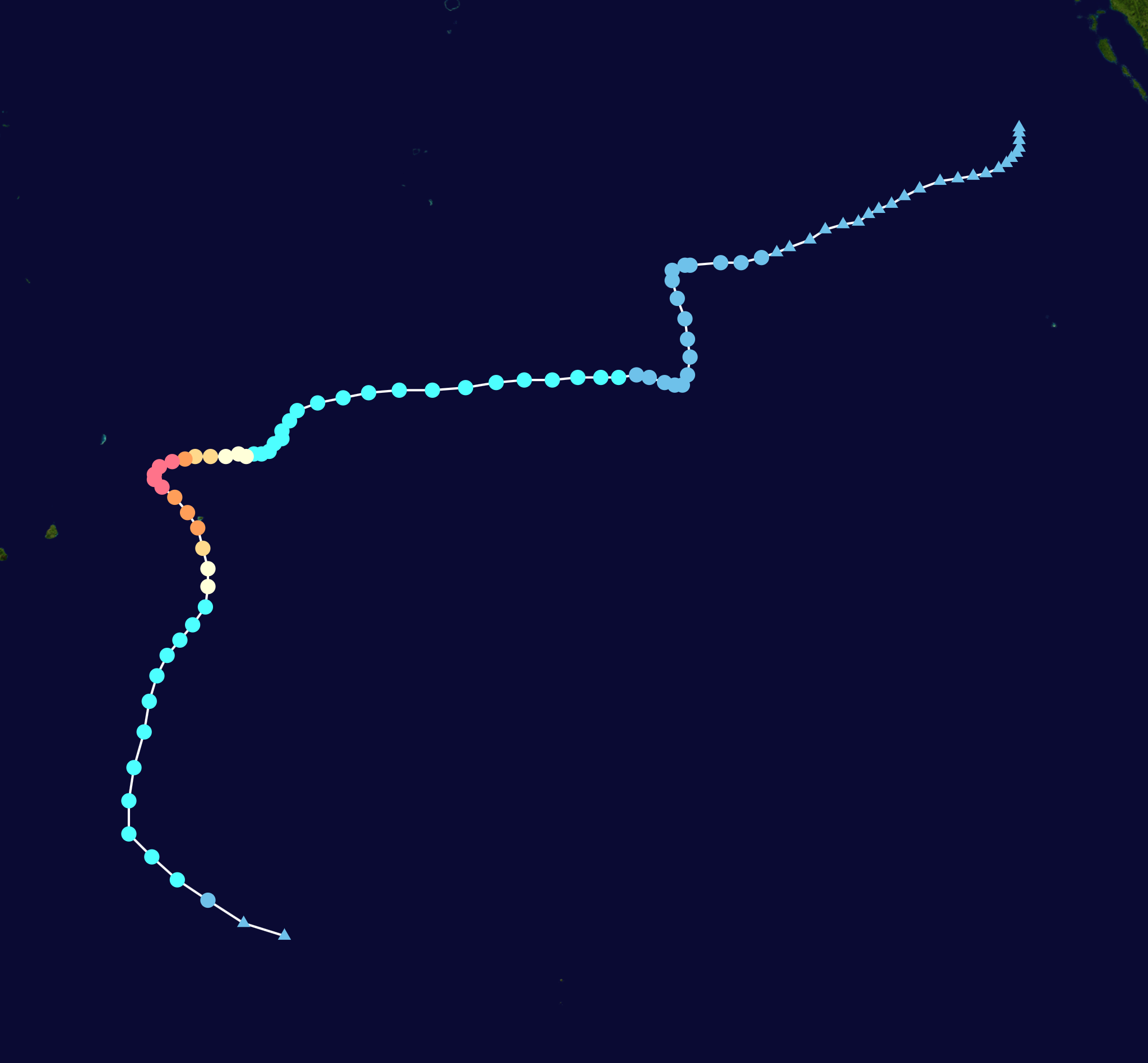
- Duration: January 18 – February 4
- Peak intensity: 215 km/h (130 mph) (10-min); 915 hPa (mbar)

Similar to Alison, Bella originated on January 18 from a surge in the monsoon trough to the southwest of Sumatra. For several days, the system remained weak as it moved generally west-southwestward. On January 25, it intensified to tropical storm status, but Bella took three more days to intensify to tropical cyclone status, or with 10‑minute maximum sustained winds of 120 km/h (75 mph). The cyclone attained peak intensity on January 29, officially reaching winds of 155 km/h (96 mph). The JTWC unofficially estimated winds of 240 km/h (150 mph), the highest the agency estimated for any storm in the Southern Hemisphere in the year. Bella later turned to the southeast and weakened, passing about 50 km (31 mi) west of Rodrigues on January 31. The storm turned to the south-southwest and back to the southeast again, becoming extratropical on February 4.

While passing near Rodrigues, Bella produced strong winds and high tides, the latter of which caused flooding in the capital Port Mathurin. The storm was considered the worst on the island in 20 years. About 1,500 homes were damaged or destroyed, leaving 1,000 people homeless. Bella also severely damaged crops, roads, and the power grid on Rodrigues. The storm killed about half of the Rodrigues flying fox, a critically endangered species. Elsewhere, Bella was believed to have sunk a Madagascar cargo ship, with its 36 people on board.

=== Tropical Cyclone Cynthia ===
- Tropical cyclone (MFR)
- Tropical storm (SSHWS)
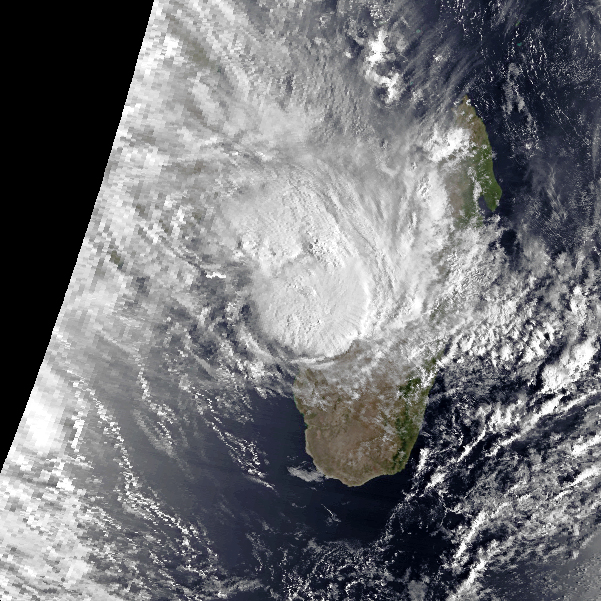
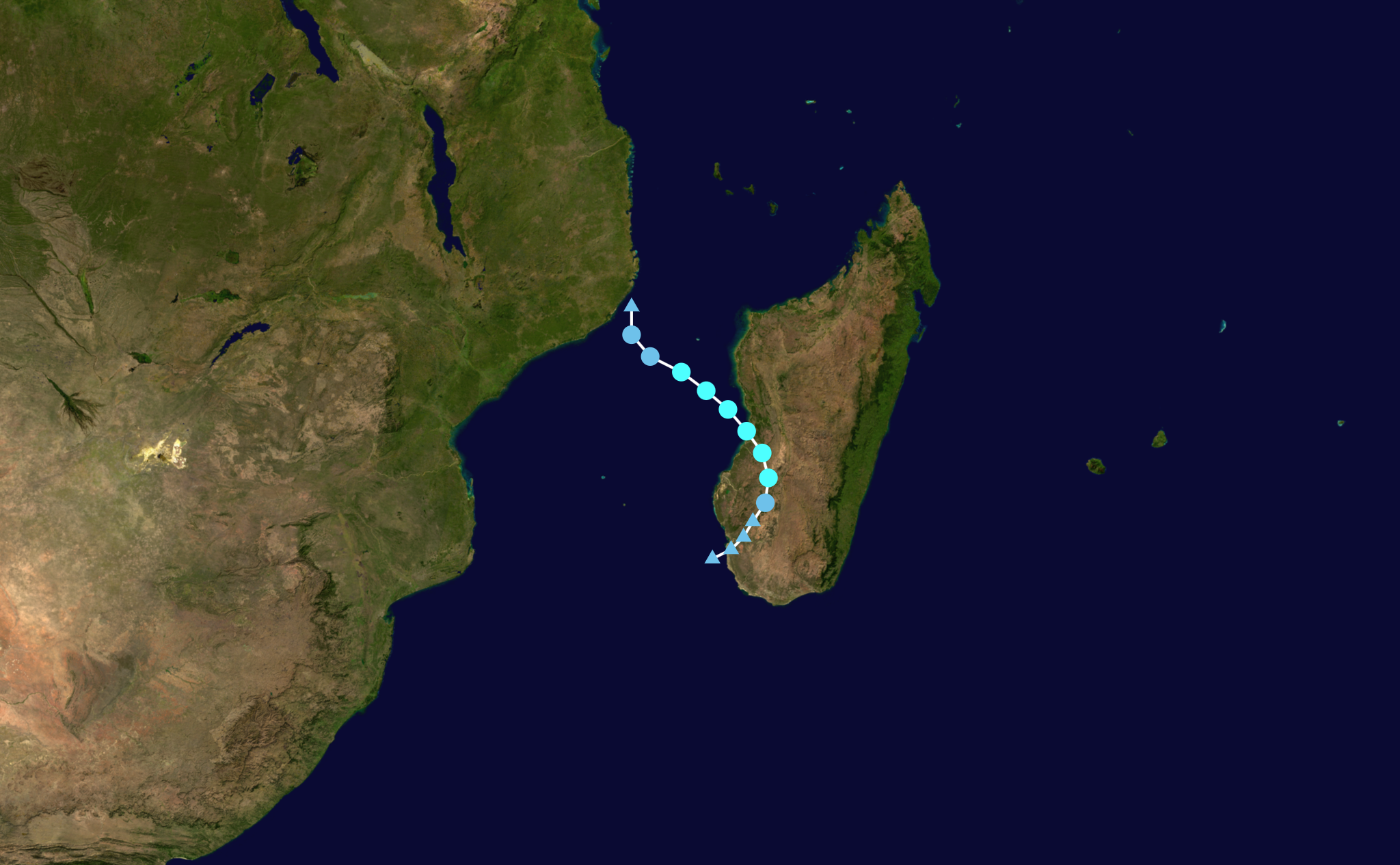
- Duration: February 16 – February 19
- Peak intensity: 125 km/h (75 mph) (10-min); 970 hPa (mbar)

For several days beginning on February 9, an area of convection persisted in the Mozambique Channel off the southeast coast of Mozambique, between the towns of Beira and Quelimane. On February 15, deep convection increased greatly, leading to a tropical disturbance forming at 06:00 UTC the next morning. Also on February 16, the JTWC initiated advisories on Tropical Cyclone 10S. Moving southeastward, the convection quickly organized around the center, aided by warm sea surface temperatures and convergence. Late on February 16, the system intensified into Tropical Storm Cynthia while it was passing near Juan de Nova Island. Continuing to rapidly intensify, Cynthia attained tropical cyclone status on February 17, reaching peak winds of 125 km/h (78 mph). Shortly thereafter, the storm made landfall on western Madagascar just north of Morondava. It rapidly weakened over land as it shifted to the south and later southwest. Early on February 19, Cynthia emerged into the Mozambique Channel as a tropical disturbance, and the circulation dissipated shortly thereafter.

Making landfall in western Madagascar, Cynthia produced peak winds of 157 km/h (98 mph) at Maintirano, with gusts to 185 km/h (115 mph). The city also recorded 420.1 mm (16.54 in) of rainfall. In some locations, the rainfall from Cynthia was heavier than the average annual precipitation. In some villages, the storm destroyed upwards of 98% of houses, leaving 125,000 people homeless nationwide. The cyclone also wrecked crops and killed livestock, with over 20,000 tons of rice destroyed that had been readied for harvest. Cynthia destroyed an irrigation canal in Morondava, flooding 10,000 ha (25,000 acres) of rice fields. Flooding washed away or heavily damaged several roads and bridges in southwestern Madagascar. The Morondava River, which empties into the Mozambique Channel at Morondava, eroded greatly during the storm. Cynthia killed 36 people, mostly in Toliara. Heavy rains from the storm also spread into Tanzania, causing flooding that destroyed 90 houses and washed away two bridges.

Following the storm, the Malagasy government appealed for international aid. In response, the United States Agency for International Development (USAID) provided US$25,000 toward rebuilding damaged roofs and placing a temporary pontoon bridge where a bridge had been washed out. Due to the damaged rice harvest, the Food for Peace program via USAID provided 15,000 tons of rice to Madagascar at the cost of US$7.5 million. The French government bought 130 tons of rice seed to be distributed to affected farmers. Local governments in Madagascar provided 6,000 farmers with rice seed to replant the ruined crop. In addition, the Swiss government provided money toward a reforestation project to discourage slash-and-burn practices.

=== Severe Tropical Storm Debra ===
- Severe tropical storm (MFR)
- Category 2 tropical cyclone (SSHWS)
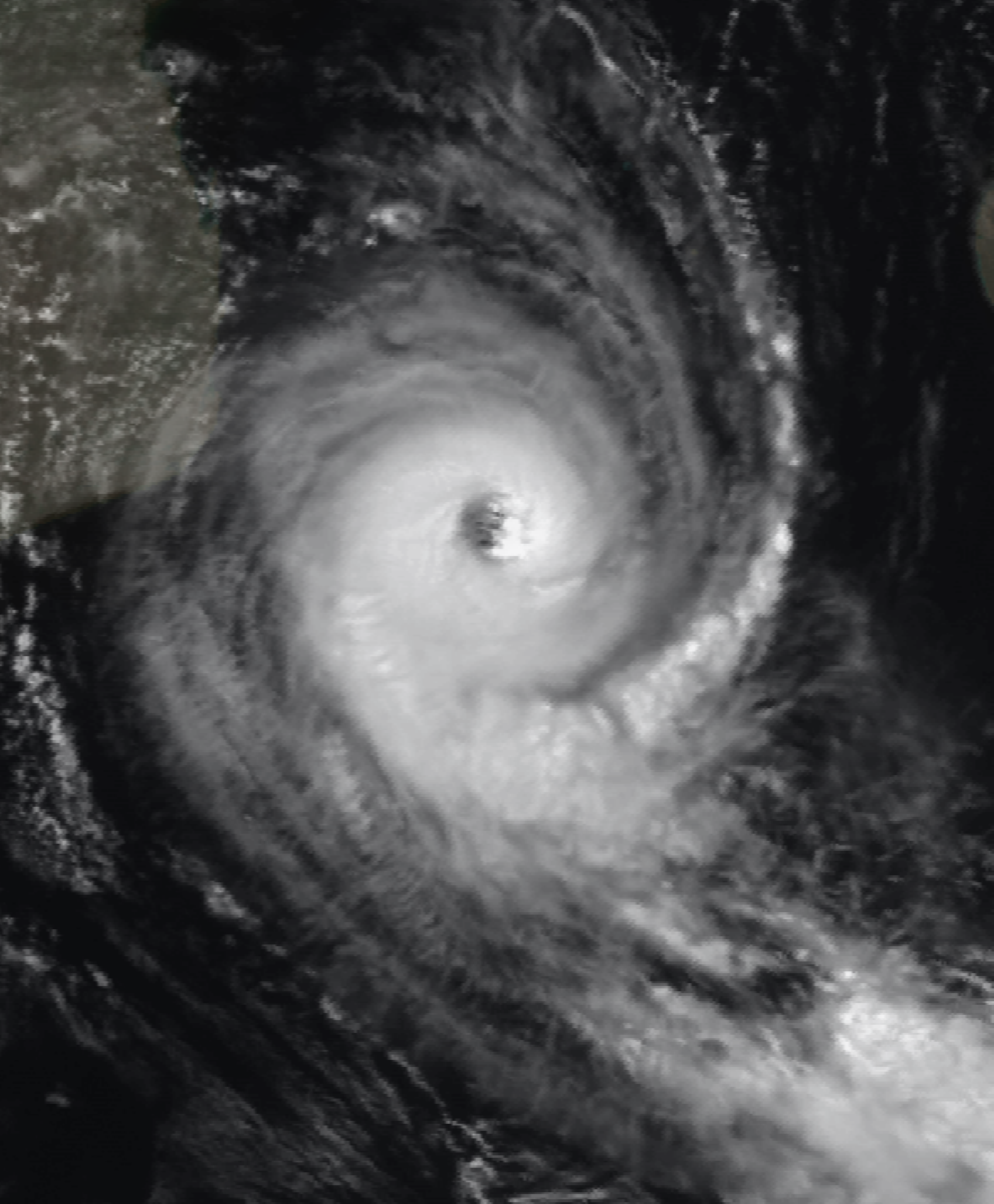
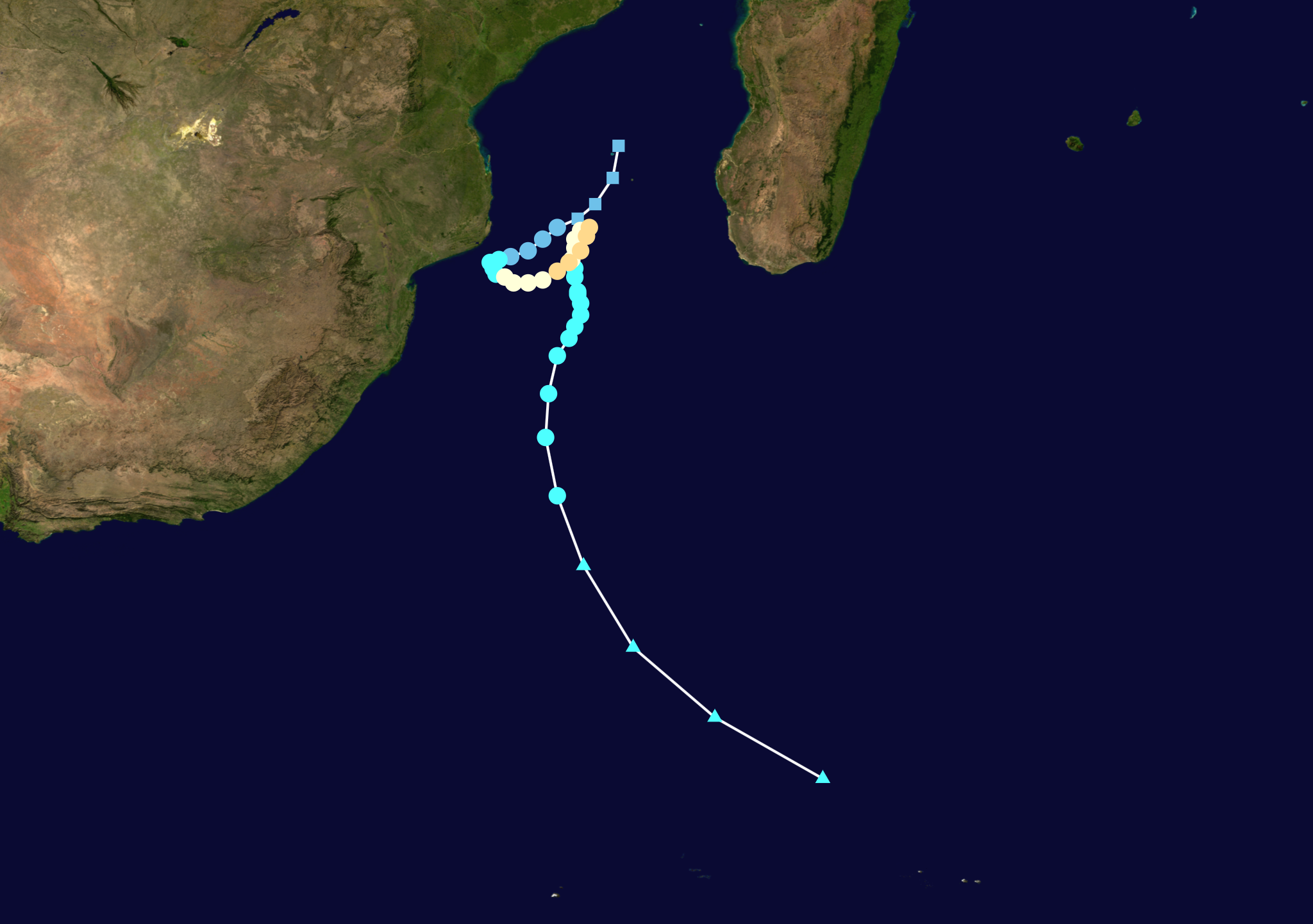
- Duration: February 22 – March 4
- Peak intensity: 115 km/h (70 mph) (10-min); 966 hPa (mbar)

After Cynthia dissipated, a residual trough persisted in the Mozambique Channel, spawning a tropical disturbance on February 22 about halfway between Madagascar and Mozambique. The interaction between cool air from the south and warm monsoonal air to the north fueled deep convection. After initially moving to the south, the system turned more to the southwest toward Mozambique on February 24, developing an eye feature in the center. The JTWC initiated advisories that day as Tropical Cyclone 12S, although the MFR initially maintained the system as a subtropical depression. The MFR reported that the subtropical depression attained gales on February 25, by which time the JTWC already estimated winds of 140 km/h (87 mph). That day, the storm approached the coast of Mozambique within 100 km (62 mi) before turning to the east-northeast. On February 26, the MFR named the system Debra, and later that day estimated peak 10‑minute winds of 115 km/h (71 mph). In contrast, the JTWC estimated peak 1‑minute winds of 165 km/h (103 mph). While moving to the northeast, Debra passed within 200 km (120 mi) of Europa Island on February 27. The storm subsequently executed a counterclockwise loop to the south, during which it began weakening. By February 28, Debra had weakened to minimal tropical storm status while accelerating to the southeast, although it briefly re-intensified the next day. On March 4, an approaching cold front absorbed the storm.

While near Europa Island, Debra produced gusts of 63 km/h (39 mph) and sustained winds of 48 km/h (30 mph).

=== Severe Tropical Storm Elma ===
- Severe tropical storm (MFR)
- Category 1 tropical cyclone (SSHWS)
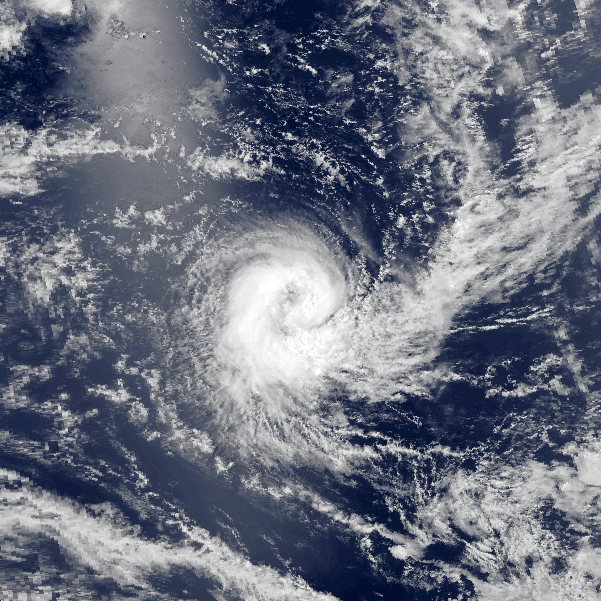
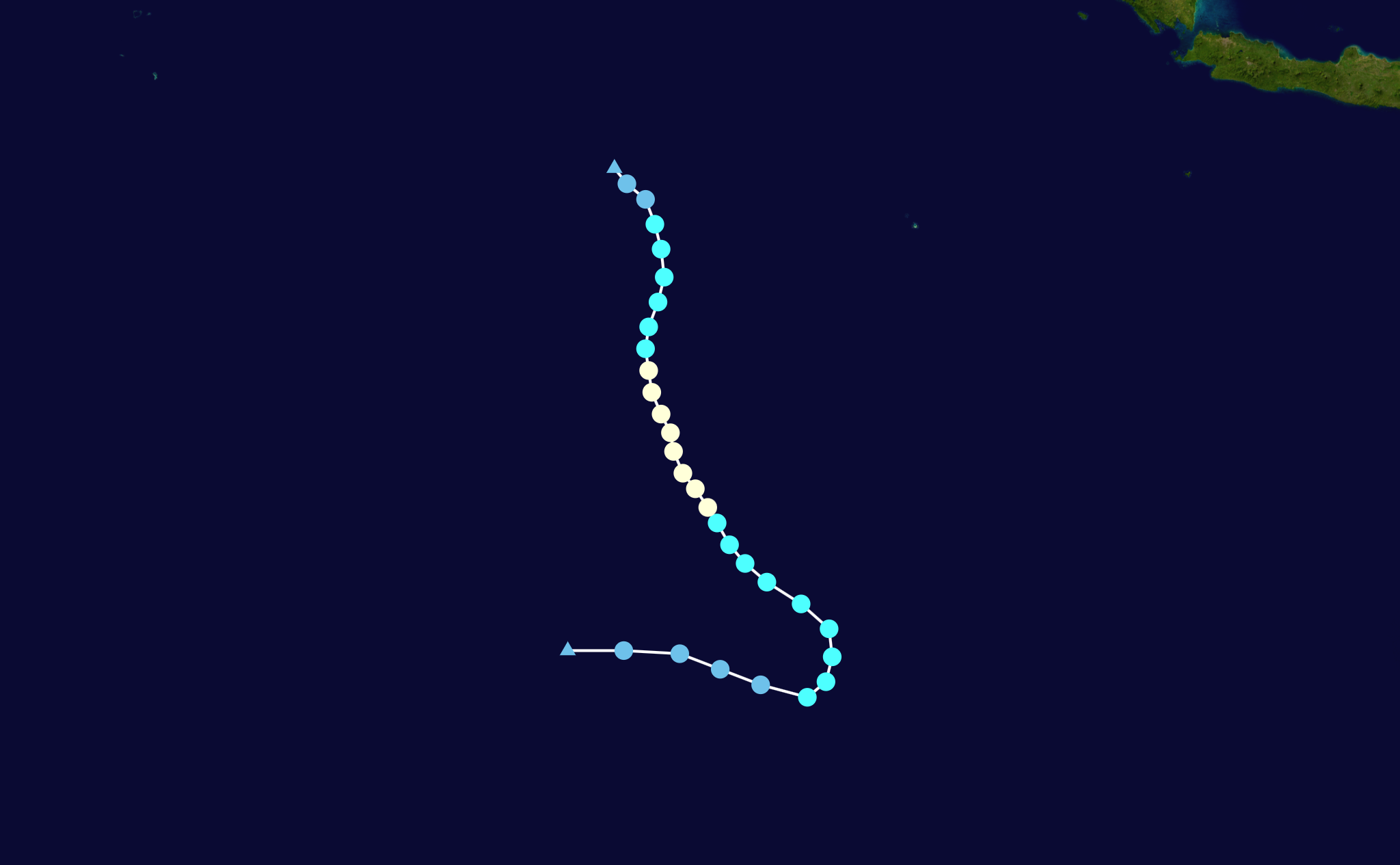
- Duration: February 26 – March 5
- Peak intensity: 105 km/h (65 mph) (10-min); 966 hPa (mbar)

On February 26, a tropical disturbance formed in the northeastern portion of the basin, well to the east-southeast of Diego Garcia. It originated from the monsoon trough, and moved generally to the south-southeast while quickly intensifying. Late on February 26, the MFR upgraded the depression to Tropical Storm Elma, around the same time the JTWC began tracking it as Tropical Cyclone 17S. On February 27, the JTWC estimated Elma attained peak 1‑minute winds of 110 km/h (68 mph), before assessing the storm as weakening. In contrast, the MFR estimated Emla continued to slowly intensify to a 10‑minute peak strength of 105 km/h (65 mph) on March 1. Shortly thereafter, the storm crossed 90° E into the Australian region, where the Bureau of Meteorology estimated that Elma entered at tropical cyclone status. Steady weakening commenced due to the influence of a trough and cooler waters. Elma weakened to the equivalent of tropical depression status by March 3 before turning back to the west. On March 5, the system recrossed 90° E into the south-west Indian Ocean, dissipating shortly thereafter.

=== Tropical Cyclone Fatima ===
- Tropical cyclone (MFR)
- Category 2 tropical cyclone (SSHWS)
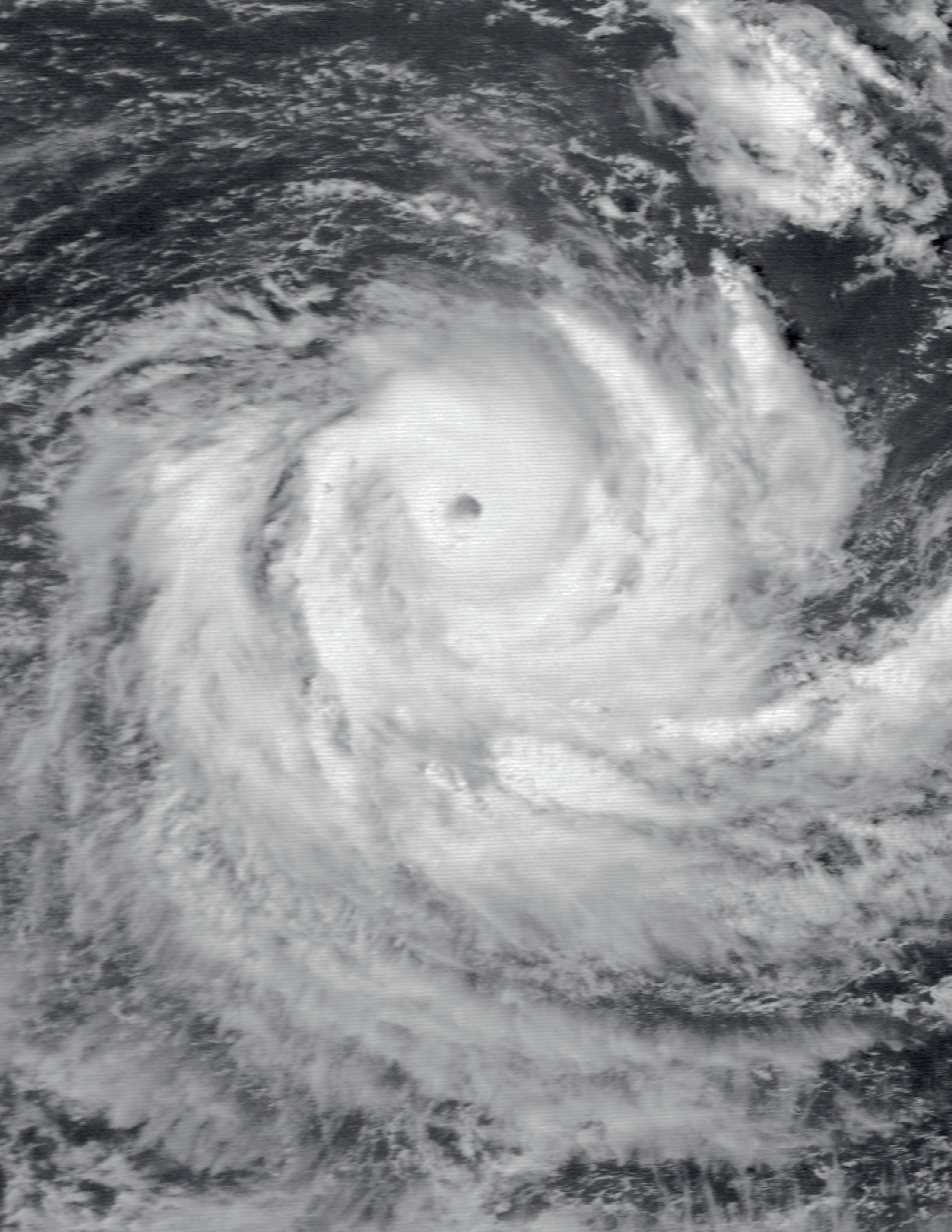
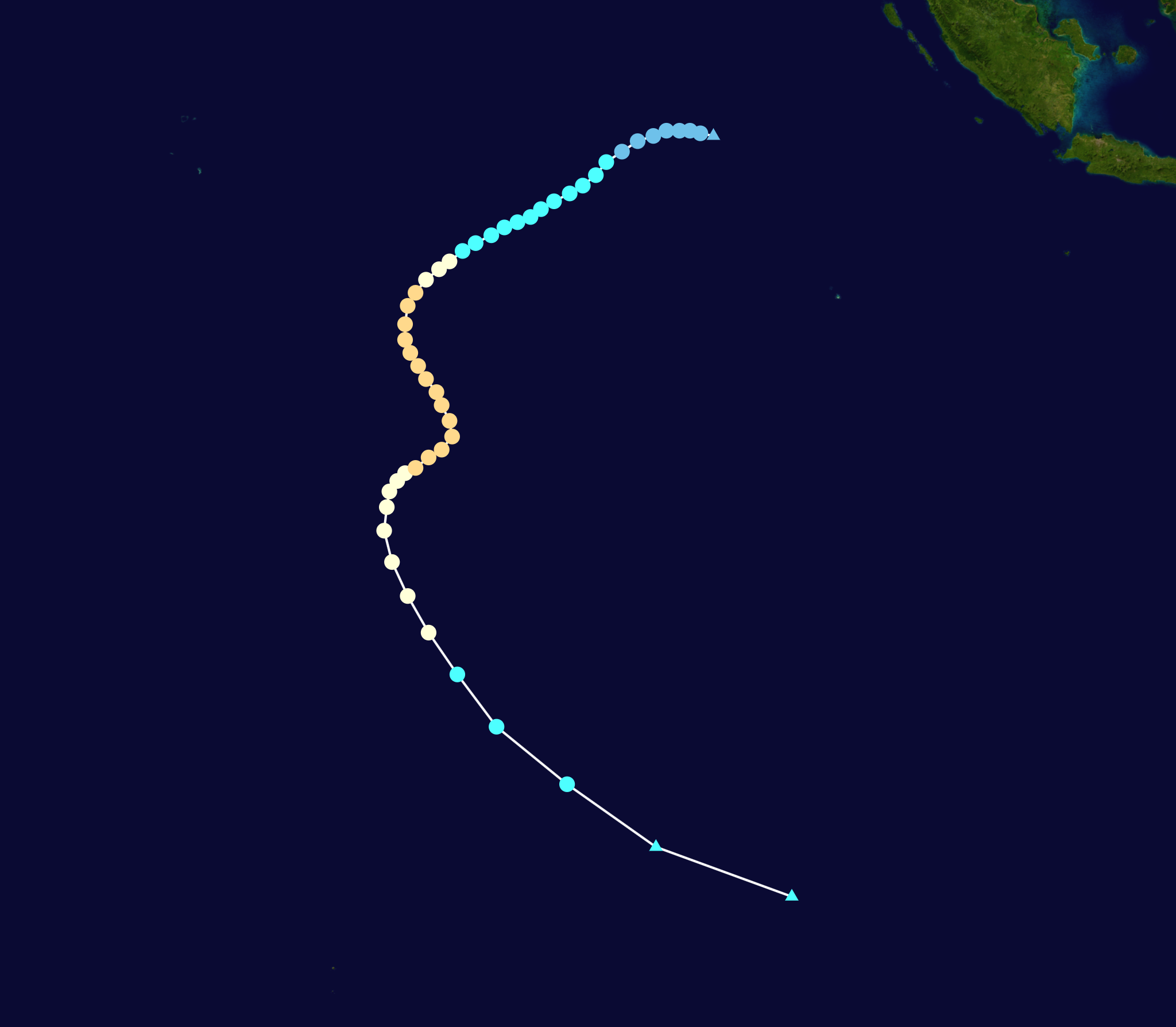
- Duration: March 22 (entered basin) – April 1
- Peak intensity: 135 km/h (85 mph) (10-min); 954 hPa (mbar)

A surge in the monsoon trough spawned what would become Cyclone Fatima to the southwest of Sumatra. On March 21, the MFR identified a tropical disturbance in the Australian region, which crossed into the south-west Indian Ocean on the next day. Also on March 22, the MFR upgraded the storm to Tropical Storm Fatima, and the JTWC tracked the system as Tropical Cyclone 17S. The storm moved southwestward due to a ridge to the northwest, and gradually intensified. On March 25, the JTWC upgraded Fatima to the equivalent of a minimal hurricane, although the MFR only estimated 10‑minute winds of 95 km/h (59 mph) at that time. Due to a break in the ridge, Fatima turned toward the south on March 26, around the time that the JTWC estimated peak 1‑minute winds of 165 km/h (103 mph). The storm later turned more to the southeast, although it shifted back to the southwest on March 29. On the next day, the MFR upgraded Fatima to tropical cyclone status and estimated peak 10‑minute winds of 135 km/h (84 mph). Fatima turned back to the southeast on March 31 and accelerated, weakening to tropical storm status due to upper-level wind shear. As it was approaching 90° E, Fatima became extratropical on April 1.

=== Tropical Depression G1 ===
- Tropical depression (MFR)
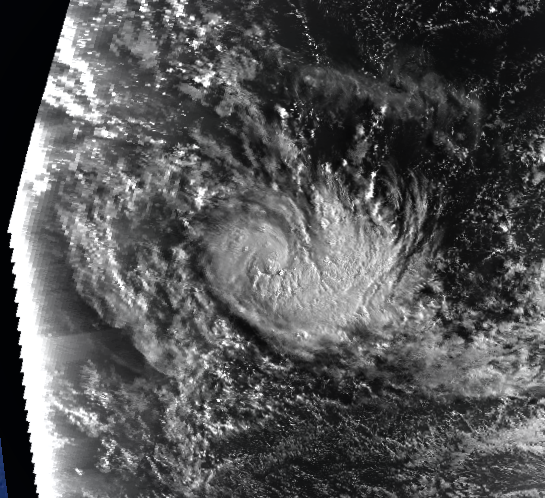
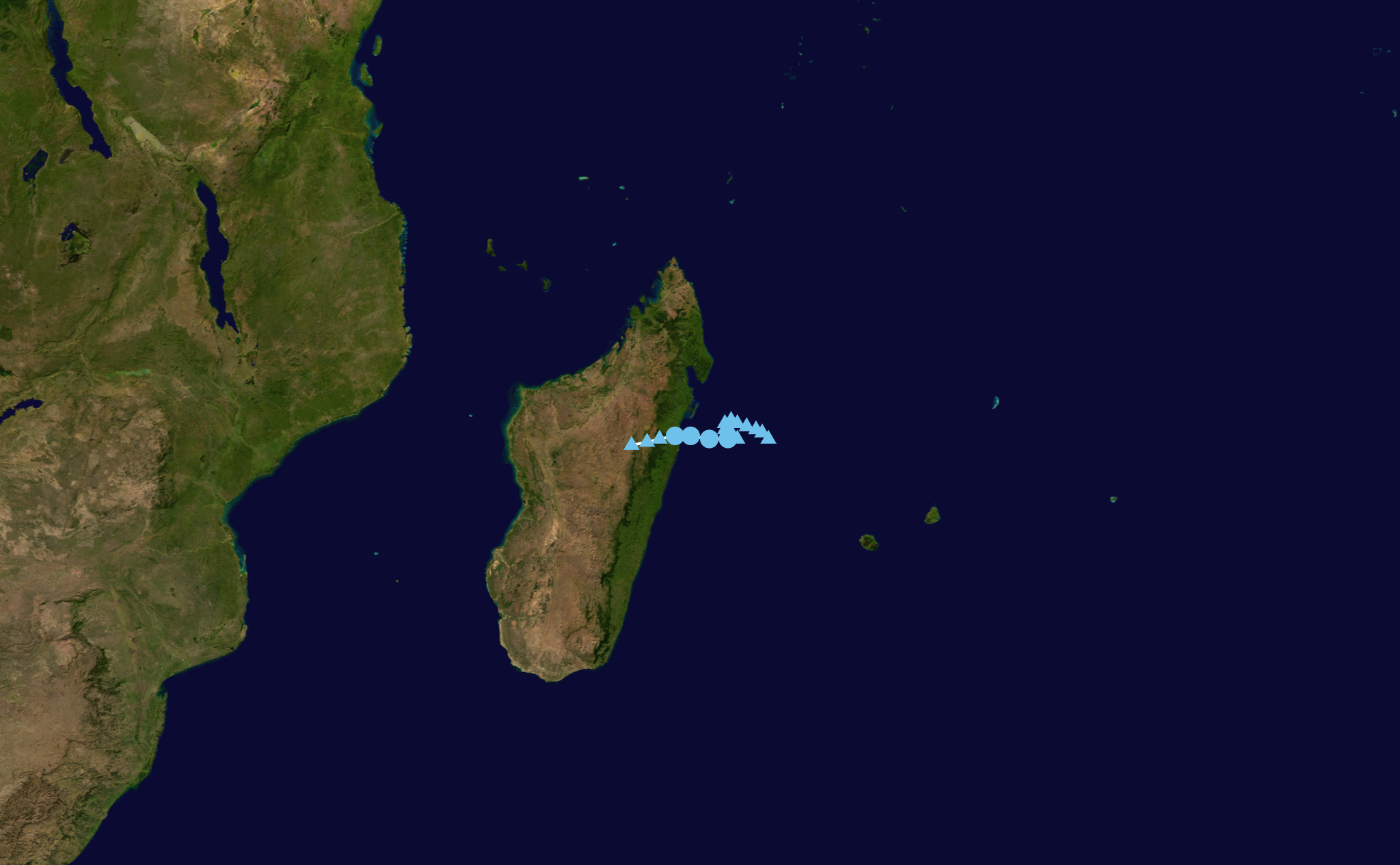
- Duration: March 30 – April 3
- Peak intensity: 50 km/h (30 mph) (10-min); 998 hPa (mbar)

On March 30, an area of convection spawned a small tropical disturbance about 310 km (190 mi) east of Toamasina off the eastern coast of Madagascar. Classified as Tropical Disturbance G1, the system initially moved to the west-northwest and had poorly-organized convection. On April 1, the disturbance turned back to the southeast and organized more due to an increase in convection. Later that day it turned back to the west toward Madagascar. On April 2, the disturbance intensified into a tropical depression, reaching peak winds of 50 km/h (31 mph). At 09:00 UTC that day, the system made landfall about 30 km (19 mi) north of Toamasina. It quickly weakened over land, dissipating on April 3.

The depression brought heavy rainfall to eastern Madagascar that resulted in flooding. Toamasina reported 228.2 mm (8.98 in) of rainfall, as well as wind gusts to 90 km/h (56 mph). The floods killed 18 people in the country.

=== Moderate Tropical Storm Gritelle ===
- Moderate tropical storm (MFR)
- Tropical storm (SSHWS)
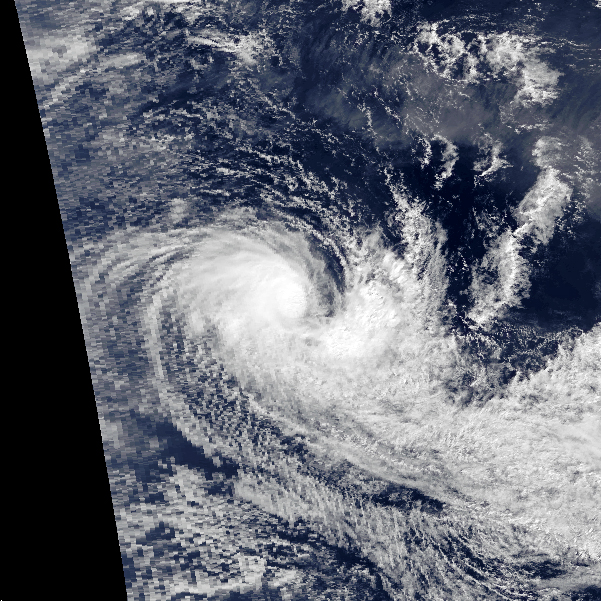
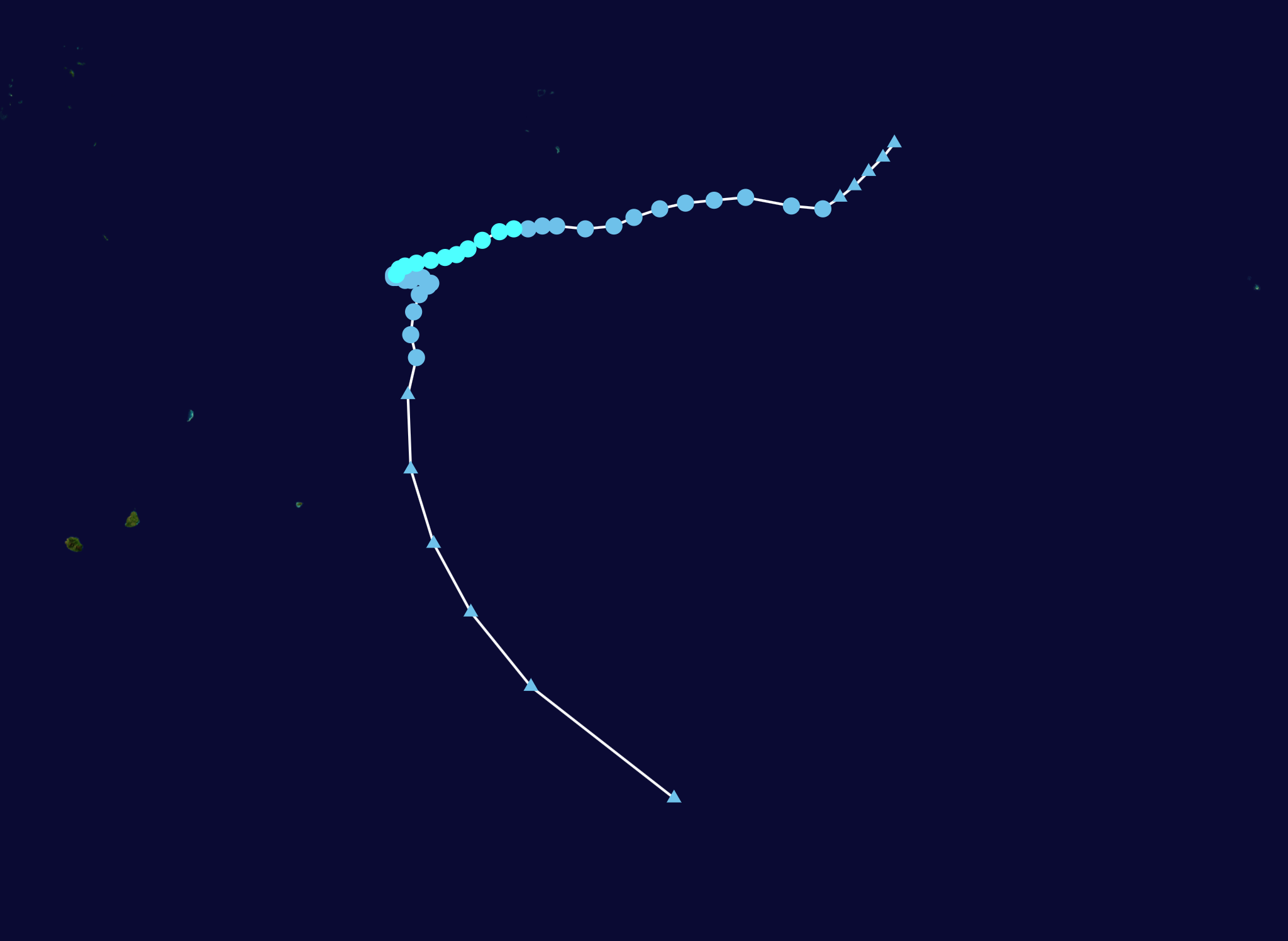
- Duration: June 5 – June 16
- Peak intensity: 80 km/h (50 mph) (10-min); 984 hPa (mbar)

On June 5, the near-equator trough spawned a tropical disturbance to the east-southeast of Diego Garcia. The system moved to the southwest and later to the west, influenced by a trough to the south. Initially it failed to intensify much, although an anticyclone provided favorable conditions for development, as did warm water temperatures. On June 7, the system passed south of the Chagos Archipelago, and on the next day the JTWC classified it as Tropical Cyclone 22S, the final of the season. When the system reached the MFR area of satellite coverage on June 10, it appeared as a well-developed system; as a result, the agency upgraded the depression to Tropical Storm Gritelle, estimating peak 10‑minute winds of 85 km/h (53 mph). On June 11, Gritelle began weakening due to increased wind shear, deteriorating to tropical depression status on June 12. Over the subsequent two days, the system executed a loop, maintaining its status as a tropical depression or disturbance. On June 15, Gritelle passed about 425 km (264 mi) east of Rodrigues while moving to the south. It accelerated to the southeast, dissipating on June 16.

The storm formed was very late in the cyclone season, making Gritelle the strongest June storm in 20 years, as well as the latest in the cyclone year that a storm was properly named. Tropical Depression Fely in 1983 formed later but was wrongly named, and Cyclone Odette in 1971 formed in July when the cyclone year ended on July 31. The end of the tropical cyclone year shifted from July 31 to June 30 in 2003.

=== Other storms ===
On September 19, the JTWC began monitoring a system near the Chagos Archipelago. The system tracked westward, organizing enough that the JTWC classified it as Tropical Cyclone 01S on September 21. Despite predictions that it would strengthen into a tropical storm, the system failed to intensify beyond winds of 55 km/h (34 mph), and dissipated on September 25.

Similar to the previous system, the JTWC began monitoring a disturbance on October 15. After an initial movement to the southwest, the system turned to the north and later to the west. The JTWC classified the system as Tropical Cyclone 02S on October 18, estimating peak winds of 55 km/h (34 mph). Two days later, the agency declared the system as dissipated.

== Storm names ==
Within the South-West Indian Ocean basin, tropical systems that attain 10-minute sustained windspeeds of 65 km/h, (40 mph) are assigned a name by the Regional Specialized Meteorological Centre on Réunion (RSMC La Réunion). Systems that move into this region from the Australian region are given a second name by Météo-France. New naming lists are used every year so a name is normally used only once, thus no names are retired.

- Alison
- Bella
- Cynthia
- Debra
- Elma
- Fatima
- Gritelle
- Hazelle (unused)
- Inese (unused)
- Julia (unused)
- Ketsia (unused)
- Lorna (unused)
- Mary (unused)
- Nadege (unused)
- Olivette (unused)
- Prescilla (unused)
- Quincy (unused)
- Rosalie (unused)
- Susan (unused)
- Therese (unused)
- Ursula (unused)
- Valerie (unused)
- Wilna (unused)

== Season effects ==
| Name | Dates | Peak intensity | | | Areas affected | Damage (USD) | Deaths | Ref(s). |
| Name | Dates | Category | Wind speed | Pressure | Areas affected | Damage (USD) | Deaths | Ref(s). |
|---|---|---|---|---|---|---|---|---|
| 01S | September 21 – 25 | Tropical Depression | 55 km/h (34 mph) | 1,000 hPa (30 inHg) | None | None | None | |
| 02S | October 18 – 20 | Tropical Depression | 55 km/h (34 mph) | 1,000 hPa (30 inHg) | None | None | None | |
| A2/04S | November 30 – December 7 | Severe Tropical Storm | 102 km/h (63 mph) | 984 hPa (29.1 inHg) | None | None | None | |
| Alison | January 8 – 18 | Tropical Cyclone | 115 km/h (71 mph) | 968 hPa (28.6 inHg) | None | None | None | |
| Bella | January 18 – February 4 | Intense Tropical Cyclone | 215 km/h (134 mph) | 915 hPa (27.0 inHg) | Rodrigues | Unknown | 36 | |
| Cynthia | February 16 – 19 | Tropical Cyclone | 125 km/h (78 mph) | 970 hPa (29 inHg) | Madagascar, Juan de Nova Island | Unknown | 36 | |
| Debra | February 22 – March 4 | Severe Tropical Storm | 110 km/h (68 mph) | 966 hPa (28.5 inHg) | Mozambique, Europa Island | None | None | |
| Elma | February 26 – March 5 | Severe Tropical Storm | 110 km/h (68 mph) | 965 hPa (28.5 inHg) | None | None | None | |
| Fatima | March 22 – April 1 | Tropical Cyclone | 130 km/h (81 mph) | 954 hPa (28.2 inHg) | None | None | None | |
| G1 | March 30 – April 3 | Tropical Depression | 55 km/h (34 mph) | 998 hPa (29.5 inHg) | Madagascar | Unknown | 16 | |
| Gritelle | June 5 – 16 | Moderate Tropical Storm | 85 km/h (53 mph) | 984 hPa (29.1 inHg) | None | None | | |
Season aggregates
| 11 systems | September 21 – June 16 | | 155 km/h (96 mph) | 936 hPa (27.6 inHg) | | | | |

== See also ==
- Tropical cyclones in 1990 and 1991
- Atlantic hurricane seasons: 1990, 1991
- Pacific hurricane seasons: 1990, 1991
- Pacific typhoon seasons: 1990, 1991
- North Indian Ocean cyclone seasons: 1990, 1991
