= Cyclone Bella =

South-West Indian Ocean tropical cyclone in 1991

Intense Tropical Cyclone Bella
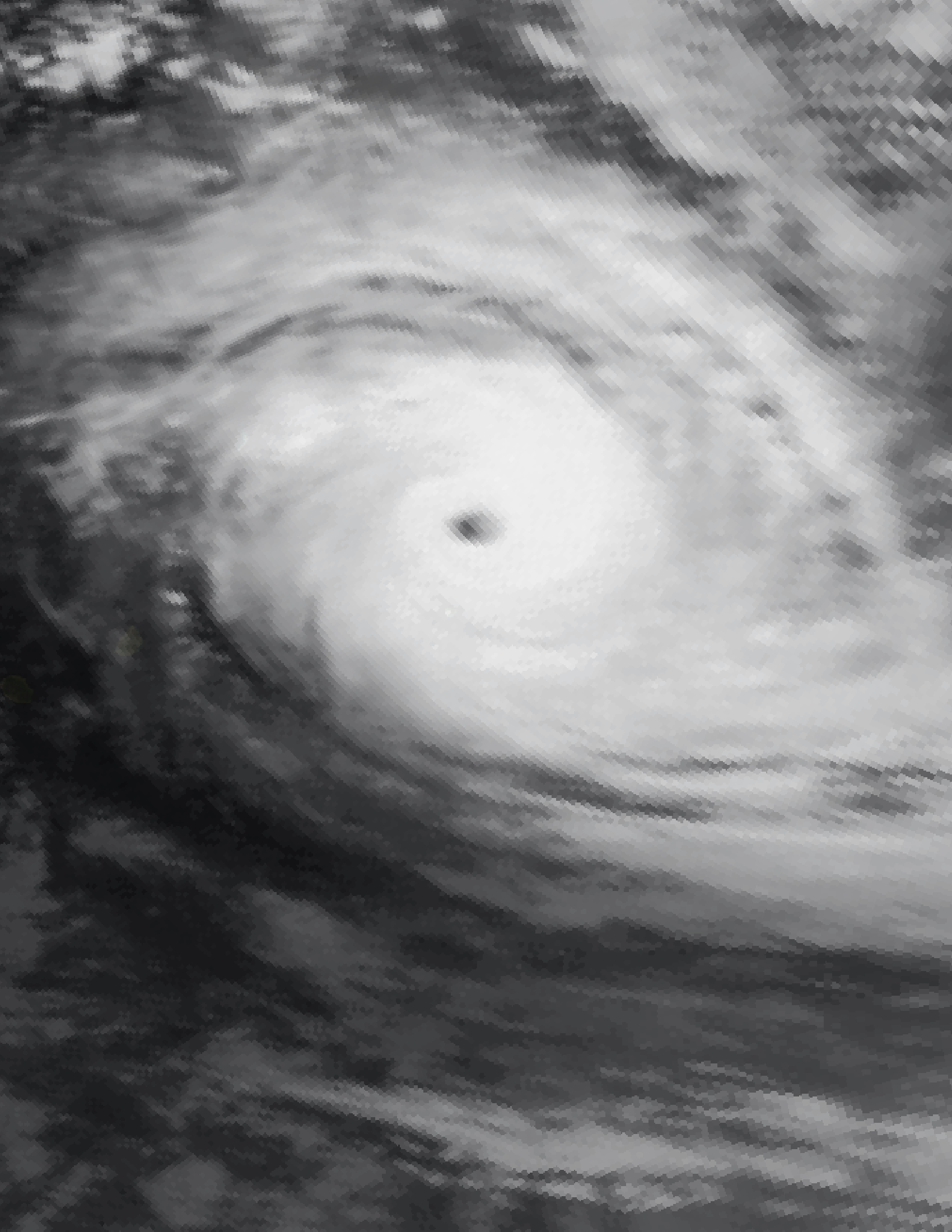
- Cyclone Bella near peak intensity

Meteorological history
- Formed: January 18, 1991
- Dissipated: February 4, 1991

Intense tropical cyclone
- 10-minute sustained (MFR)
- Highest winds: 215 km/h (130 mph)
- Lowest pressure: 915 hPa (mbar); 27.02 inHg

Category 4-equivalent tropical cyclone
- 1-minute sustained (SSHWS/JTWC)
- Highest winds: 240 km/h (150 mph)

Overall effects
- Missing: 36
- Areas affected: Rodrigues, Mauritius, Réunion
- IBTrACS
- Part of the 1990–91 South-West Indian Ocean cyclone season

Intense Tropical Cyclone Bella was a destructive tropical cyclone that passed near the Mauritius outer island of Rodrigues. The second named storm of the season, Bella originated in the middle of January 1991 from a surge in the monsoon trough to the southwest of Sumatra. For several days, the system remained weak as it moved generally west-southwestward. On January 25, it intensified to tropical storm status, but Bella took three more days to intensify to tropical cyclone status, with 10 minute maximum sustained winds of 120 kilometres per hour (75 miles per hour). The cyclone attained peak intensity on January 29, officially reaching winds of 155 km/h (95 mph). The Joint Typhoon Warning Center unofficially estimated winds of 240 km/h (150 mph), the highest the agency estimated for any storm in the Southern Hemisphere in the year. Bella later turned to the southeast and weakened, passing about 50 km (30 mi) west of Rodrigues on January 31. The storm turned to the south-southwest and back to the southeast again, becoming extratropical on February 4.

While passing near Rodrigues, Bella produced strong winds and high tides, the latter of which caused flooding in the capital Port Mathurin. The storm was considered the worst on the island in 20 years. About 1,500 homes were damaged or destroyed, leaving 1,000 people homeless. Bella also severely damaged crops, roads, and the power grid on Rodrigues. The storm killed about half of the Rodrigues flying fox, a critically endangered species. Elsewhere, Bella was believed to have sunk a Madagascar cargo ship, with its 36 people on board.

== Meteorological history ==
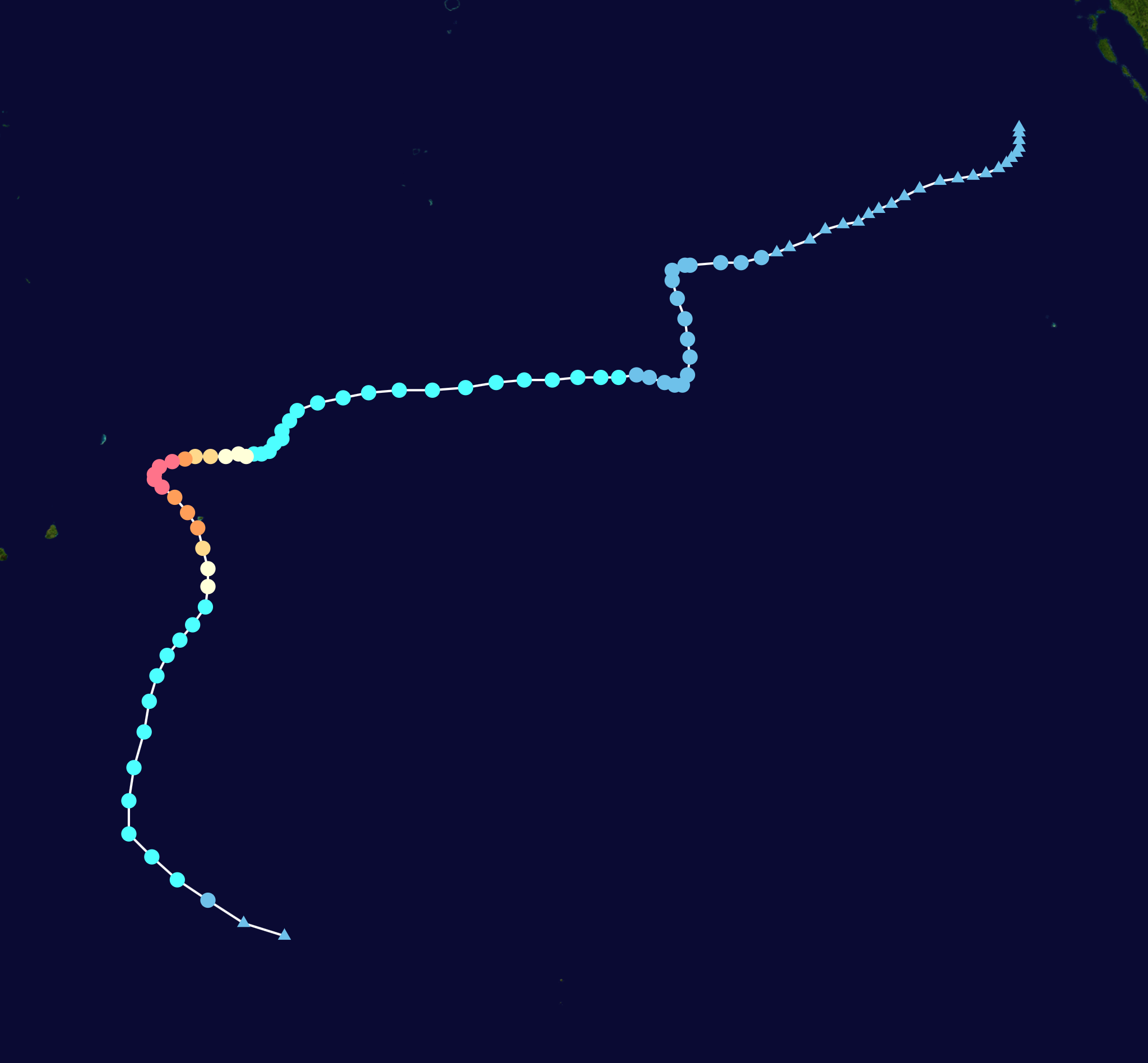
Map plotting the storm's track and intensity, according to the Saffir–Simpson scale Map key Saffir–Simpson scale Tropical depression (≤38 mph, ≤62 km/h) Tropical storm (39–73 mph, 63–118 km/h) Category 1 (74–95 mph, 119–153 km/h) Category 2 (96–110 mph, 154–177 km/h) Category 3 (111–129 mph, 178–208 km/h) Category 4 (130–156 mph, 209–251 km/h) Category 5 (≥157 mph, ≥252 km/h) Unknown Storm type Tropical cyclone Subtropical cyclone Extratropical cyclone, remnant low, tropical disturbance, or monsoon depression

Similar to Cyclone Alison that had formed in early January 1991, a surge in the monsoon trough spawned what would become Tropical Cyclone Bella, associated with the Intertropical Convergence Zone. On January 13, the Joint Typhoon Warning Center (JTWC) (Note: The Joint Typhoon Warning Center is a joint United States Navy – United States Air Force task force that issues tropical cyclone warnings for the region.) began monitoring a system about 660 km (410 mi) southwest of Padang, Sumatra in the Australian basin. Moving to the west-southwest, the system crossed into the south-west Indian Ocean on January 17, and the next day was tracked by the Météo France office in Réunion (MFR). (Note: The Météo-France office in Réunion is the official Regional Specialized Meteorological Center for the basin.) On January 20, the disturbance turned sharply to the south-southeast, although its westward motion resumed late the following day, influenced by a ridge to the south.

On January 22, the disturbance intensified into a tropical depression. The JTWC upgraded the storm to tropical storm status on January 23, three days after classifying it as Tropical Cyclone 08S. On January 25, the MFR upgraded the depression to Tropical Storm Bella, a week after beginning to issue advisories. Around that time, the storm became visible on MFR satellite imagery. Following a lengthy period of minimal development, Bella subsequently intensified at a more regular rate as it slowed its forward motion. On January 26, it turned more to the southwest, but the westward track resumed on the next day. Aided by warm sea surface temperatures of 28 °C (82 °F), Bella began to intensify quickly. On January 28, both the JTWC and the MFR upgraded the storm to the equivalent of a minimal hurricane, estimating winds of 120 km/h (75 mph); this made Bella a tropical cyclone, the first of the season. Around this time, the storm developed a well-defined eye 60 km (35 mi) in diameter.

After becoming a tropical cyclone, Bella continued to intensify, reaching peak winds on January 29. The MFR estimated 10 minute winds of 155 km/h (95 mph), and assessed a barometric pressure of 936 mbar (27.6 inHg) at that time. Meanwhile, the JTWC estimated 1 minute peak winds of 240 km/h (150 mph); this strength, equivalent to a super typhoon, was the highest the JTWC estimated for any Southern Hemisphere storm during the tropical cyclone year. On January 30, Bella turned to the southeast and began weakening, affected by wind shear in the region. The cyclone passed about 50 km (30 mi) west of Rodrigues at 03:00 UTC on January 31, with 10 minute winds of 135 km/h (85 mph). Shortly thereafter, the cyclone deteriorated into a tropical storm. The southeast trajectory was short-lived, as Bella turned more to the south-southwest on February 1. After a final turn to the southeast, Bella became an extratropical cyclone on February 4.

== Impact and aftermath ==
Before Bella affected land, a class one warning, the lowest of four, was issued for Réunion, while a class four warning was issued for Rodrigues.

While moving near Rodrigues, Bella produced wind gusts of 210 km/h (130 mph), along with high tides that flooded the northern coastline, including the capital Port Mathurin. The storm damaged 1,200 homes and destroyed 300 others, leaving about 1,000 people homeless. About 30 schools were wrecked. The storm damaged about 75% of the electrical network was damaged, which also disrupted water supply on the island, and about 30% of roads were damaged. Over 90% of the crops on the island were destroyed, with many livestock killed. Cyclone Bella killed about half of the Rodrigues flying fox, a critically endangered species, decreasing the numbers from around 800 to around 400. The species had regrown from a minimum of around 70 in 1971, and the trend toward regrowth continued after the storm, reaching about 3,500 in 2002. The storm also affected the Rodrigues warbler. The storm also injured nine people, and overall, Bella was considered the worst storm on the island in 20 years.

A 16,570 ton cargo ship traveling from Madagascar to Réunion was lost on January 30 about 700 km (430 mi) to the south of the center of Bella. The ship likely sank due to the cyclone, with 36 people on board.

In the aftermath of the storm, seven people contracted Typhoid fever on Rodrigues in relation to the storm. After Bella passed, the government of Mauritius noted the need for 4,500 m (15,000 ft) of galvanized pipes to assist in rebuilding, as well as generators. The United States Agency for International Development donated $25,000 (1991 USD) to Mauritius to help in the aftermath. France, the United Kingdom, and India also donated to the country.

== See also ==
- Tropical cyclones in the Mascarene Islands
- Cyclone Kalunde – similar storm in 2003 that struck Rodrigues
