= Agricultural Trade Development and Assistance Act of 1954 =

- Long title: An Act to increase the consumption of United States agricultural commodities in foreign countries, to improve the foreign relations of the United States, and for other purposes.
- Nicknames: Food for Peace Act of 1954
- Enacted by: the 83rd United States Congress
- Effective: July 10, 1954

Citations
- Public law: Pub. L. 83–480
- Statutes at Large: 68 Stat. 454

Codification
- Titles amended: 7 U.S.C.: Agriculture
- U.S.C. sections created: 7 U.S.C. ch. 41 § 1691 et seq.

Legislative history
- Introduced in the Senate as S. 2475 on July 24, 1953; Committee consideration by Senate Agriculture, Nutrition, and Forestry; Passed the Senate on July 28, 1953 (Passed); Passed the House on June 16, 1954 (Passed); Signed into law by President Dwight D. Eisenhower on July 10, 1954

The Agricultural Trade Development and Assistance Act of 1954 (Pub. L. 83–480, enacted July 10, 1954) is a United States federal law that established Food for Peace, the primary and first permanent US organization for food assistance to foreign nations. The Act was signed into law on July 10, 1954, by President Dwight D. Eisenhower. The legislation authorized the United States government to dispose of surplus agricultural commodities abroad through concessional sales, donations, and barter agreements (Congress.gov, 1954, p. 2). Designed to stabilize domestic farm prices while also advancing Cold War foreign policy objectives, the act made food aid a part of U.S. international engagement. Over the following decades, it facilitated billions of dollars in agriculture exports, shaped global food markets, and expanded American influence in developing countries (Foltz, 2023) and (Office of the Historian, 1954, p. 4).

The act was popular in Congress because it allowed American farmers to sell their surplus commodities, fed hungry people, and developed future markets.

According to Eisenhower, the purpose of the legislation was to "lay the basis for a permanent expansion of our exports of agricultural products with lasting benefits to ourselves and peoples and peoples of other lands."

== Background ==
The Agricultural Trade Development and Assistance Act of 1954 (Public Law 480) was designed to expand trade and dispose of U.S. farm surpluses abroad while supporting Cold War diplomacy. Congress declared that its purpose was to "expand international trade among the U.S. and friendly nations... and make maximum efficient use of surplus agricultural commodities in furtherance of the foreign policy of the United States" (Congress.gov, 1954, p. 3). The program grew out of an initiative under Section 550 of the Mutual Security Act, which allowed surplus sales for foreign currencies (Office of the Historian, 1954, p. 1). Policymakers viewed agricultural surpluses as a domestic economic issue, but solutions to it would include feeding hungry people and developing future international markets as a way of countering Soviet influence through humanitarian and economic assistance. (Office of the Historian, 1954, p. 6-7).

== Legislative history ==
The act was first introduced as S. 2475 and passed with bipartisan support after hearings by the House Committee on Agriculture (Congress.gov, 1954, p. 8-9). Support came from farm organizations, humanitarian groups, and foreign-policy advocates who saw the measure as both an economic and diplomatic success. The Committee reported that an earlier program had already disposed of $230 million in surplus commodities and projected expansion "to $1 billion within the next three years" (Congress.gov, 1954, p. 9).

The act was first drafted by future Foreign Agricultural Service (FAS) Administrator Gwynn Garnett in 1950. It is unusual in that it allows the FAS to conclude agreements with foreign governments without the advice or consent of the United States Senate.

== Provisions ==
Public Law 480 authorized the President to expand trade, develop foreign markets, and promote U.S. foreign policy through food aid. Title I permitted concessional sales to friendly nations, Title II provided famine and disaster relief through nonprofit agencies, and Title III allowed barter of surplus commodities (Helscher, 1978, pp. 43–44). Congress stated that the Act would "help feed the world's hungry people while maintaining prosperity on the American farm." This shows the two purposes of being humanitarian and economically beneficial (Congressional Record, 1954, p. 13). Hearings confirmed that exports would move through normal trade channels without disrupting world prices. The law strengthened U.S. trade and Cold War diplomacy (Massa, 1986, p. 2, p. 6 ).

Public Law 480 is a continuing tool of negotiation between Congress and the Executive Branch (Schoenfeld, 1967, p. 12).
