= Gwynn Garnett =

American civil servant and businessperson

Gwynn Garnett (December 26, 1909 to November 21, 1995) was the administrator of the Foreign Agricultural Service (FAS) of the United States of America from 1955 to 1959. He also wrote the first draft of what would become the Agricultural Trade Development and Assistance Act of 1954 (Public Law 480) that would become known as the Food for Peace program.

== Early life ==
Garnett was born in Chicago to Robert Tompkins Garnett and his wife Edith (Higgenbotham) then raised on a farm in Wyoming. He had four siblings which included brothers Robert and Cyrus. He graduated from Iowa State University in 1934 where he was the president of the Sigma Pi fraternity chapter and the Y.M.C.A., as well as a member of Scabbard and Blade. In 1936 he married Marjorie Maree Shannon of Clinton, Iowa. They would stay married until he died and had two children, Stephen and Patience.

== Early career ==
During the 1930s, Garnett was a statistician for the United States Department of Agriculture and the Federal Land Bank. During World War II he commanded a tank company as a captain in the U.S. Army in Europe. After the war he was named director of the Food and Agriculture Division of the U.S. Military Government in West Germany. He was also involved with overseeing the Berlin Airlift. He also helped initiate parts of the Marshall Plan until his discharge. He then became a legislative liaison for the American Farm Bureau Federation.

== Food for Peace ==
Upon returning from a trip to India in 1950 Garnett wrote the first draft of what would become Public Law 480. This plan was for the United States to sell surplus agricultural commodities to countries still recovering from World War II. The sales would be made in the local currencies which were pretty much worthless outside of the borders of the countries where the sale was made. The money would then be used by the United States to fund economic development projects in those countries. The plan was popular in Congress since it helped American farmers, fed hungry nations, and fostered future markets. This plan was signed into law in 1954 while Garnett was the director of the surplus disposal group of the FAS. He was then promoted to director of the FAS and served there from 1954 to 1959.

== Later career ==
Garnett left the government in 1959 to become vice president of the Pan-Am Airways. Later he formed a company that made agricultural equipment for underdeveloped countries and had interests in cattle operations in Nigeria, Spain, Greece, and Iran. During the 1970s and 1980s, Garnett (and his son, Stephen) was one of the first American farmers to start promoting organic beef from his farm in Remington, Virginia.
