= USA Maritime =

American maritime coalition

- Formation: Circa. 2010; 16 years ago
- Type: Coalition
- Purpose: Advocate for American ship operators, maritime labor organizations and related maritime associations
- Location: United States
- Region served: United States
- Chair: Brian Schoeneman
- Website: usamaritime.org

USA Maritime is a coalition of American ship operators, maritime labor organizations and related maritime associations. The purpose of the coalition is to educate policy makers, the media, and the public about the U.S. merchant marine and the importance of the U.S. maritime industry to the military, economy, and homeland security of the United States.

== Merchant Marine ==
The U.S. Maritime Administration utilizes a cargo preference program to maintain a viable fleet of U.S.-flagged ships operated by trained American sailors, also known as the merchant marine.

According to the Maritime Administration, the maintenance of militarily useful vessels and trained merchant seamen in peacetime provides an essential sealift capability which has been frequently called on by U.S. armed forces in times of war and in times of national emergency.

U.S. merchant sailors and carriers served in every major U.S. wartime effort including the Revolutionary War, World War II, and Iraq. On July 7, 2010, the USA Maritime Coalition submitted a letter to the Honorable David T. Matsuda in support of the required application of the Cargo Preference Act of 1954.

== Economy and food aid ==
The U.S. Merchant Marine has played an integral role in the shipping of aid to developing, impoverished, or tragedy-stricken nations. Public Law 480, also known as Food for Peace, was signed into law in 1954 by President Dwight D. Eisenhower. Since then, the United States has shipped more than 100 million metric tons of aid to hungry people around the world.

The Bureau of Labor Statistics notes that 11,500 U.S. jobs are directly involved in ocean freight. According to a 2010 report by USA Maritime and Promar International, these jobs result in more than 97,000 jobs in other parts of the U.S. economy. Furthermore, the shipping of food aid alone results in an output of more than $1.9 billion from U.S. industries and generates more than a half a million in earnings to U.S. households. Texas ports received the most benefit from shipping aid, with a total of 4,070 jobs generating $177 million in earnings.

== See also ==
- Transportation in Iraq
- USAID
