= Food for Peace =

United States food distribution program

Food for Peace is a United States food distribution program. Since the 1950s, in different administrative and organizational forms, the United States' Food for Peace program has used America's agricultural surpluses to provide food assistance around the world, broaden international trade, and advance U.S. international diplomacy. Approximately 4 billion people in 150 countries have benefited directly from U.S. food assistance.

The Bureau for Humanitarian Assistance within the United States Agency for International Development (USAID) is the U.S. Government's largest provider of overseas food assistance. The food assistance programming is funded primarily through the Food for Peace Act. The Bureau for Humanitarian Assistance also receives International Disaster Assistance Funds through the Foreign Assistance Act (FAA) that can be used in emergency settings (more information below).

While U.S. food aid started out in the 1950s by donating surplus U.S. commodities to nations in need, the U.S. now purchases food for donation directly from American farmers through a competitive process. The Bureau for Humanitarian Assistance identifies need in close consultation with the host government requesting the assistance.

During the 2010s the program underwent revisions offered by in the Administration's Fiscal Year 2014 budget. These revisions would change the program to provide cash donations rather than American grown and delivered food. On April 24, 2013, the chairman of USA Maritime, a coalition of carriers and maritime unions, wrote a statement which discussed the efficacy of the program and specifically the importance of the U.S. Merchant Marine in delivering the U.S. food aid to people who are undernourished around the world. Henry cited the fact that USAID's own data actually revealed that the traditional efforts to deliver food as opposed to cash transfers for countries to buy their own food is actually 78 percent cheaper per ton of food. Henry offers that this is a significant fact in the effort to address global hunger.

Food for Peace was moved from USAID to the U.S. Department of Agriculture after DOGE dismantled USAID during the second Donald Trump administration. After the move, Food for Peace was repurposed to provide food aid to non-emergency countries while bypassing countries at risk of famine.

== Early history of United States food assistance ==
America's food assistance programs began in 1812 when James Madison sent emergency aid to earthquake victims in Venezuela. As director of the American Relief Administration, Herbert Hoover led a $20 million feeding program in Russia during the 1920s under the Russian Famine Relief Act. In 1948, the United States launched the Marshall Plan, which provided dollars for Europeans to purchase American food exports. The Marshall Plan helped rejuvenate and unite Europe while laying the foundations for a permanent U.S. food assistance program. Many of the European countries the U.S. Government helped at that time have since become major food exporters and important international donors.

== Authorizing legislation ==
=== Public Law 480 (1954) ===
Minnesota Senator Hubert Humphrey, a leading liberal Democrat, promoted a food for peace program that would give away surplus crops owned by the U.S. government as an instrument of foreign policy in the Cold War. The bill appealed to some conservative Republicans from farm states, but was opposed by others, including Barry Goldwater.

Another account credits the idea to Cheyenne County, Kansas farmer Peter O'Brien, who shared the idea, in 1953, while attending a local Farm Bureau meeting. (At the time, U.S. agricultural surpluses had reached "alarming levels," according to the Robert J. Dole Institute of Politics, and storing the "excess grain" was costing the government "millions of dollars" annually — while it "deteriorated and became inedible.") A U.S. Senator from Kansas, Andy Schoeppel, sponsored such legislation.

On July 10, 1954, Dwight D. Eisenhower, another Kansan, signed the Agricultural Trade Development and Assistance Act — or Public Law (P.L.) 480 — an action which simultaneously created the Office of Food for Peace. By signing this legislation, the President laid "the basis for a permanent expansion of our exports of agricultural products with lasting benefits to ourselves and peoples of other lands." The bill, a solution for food deficient, cash-poor countries, created a secondary foreign market by allowing food-deficient countries to pay for American food imports in their own currencies instead of in U.S. dollars. These currencies were, for the most part, worthless outside their issuing countries. The U.S. used these currencies to pay for economic development projects inside those countries.

The law's original purpose was to expand international trade, to promote the economic stability of American agriculture, to make maximum use of surplus agricultural commodities in the furtherance of foreign policy, and to stimulate the expansion of foreign trade in agricultural commodities produced in the United States. Critics view the law as "a means of disposing of costly domestic agricultural surpluses."

The law was originally drafted by future Foreign Agricultural Service (FAS) administrator Gwynn Garnett after returning from a trip to India in 1950. The bill is unusual in that it gave the FAS the ability to conclude agreements with foreign governments without the approval of the United States Senate.

Lyndon B. Johnson limited the PL-480 grain shipments for critical famine aid to India, to pressure it into toning down its criticism on the US involvement in the Vietnam War.

=== Kennedy era and Food for Peace Act (1966) ===
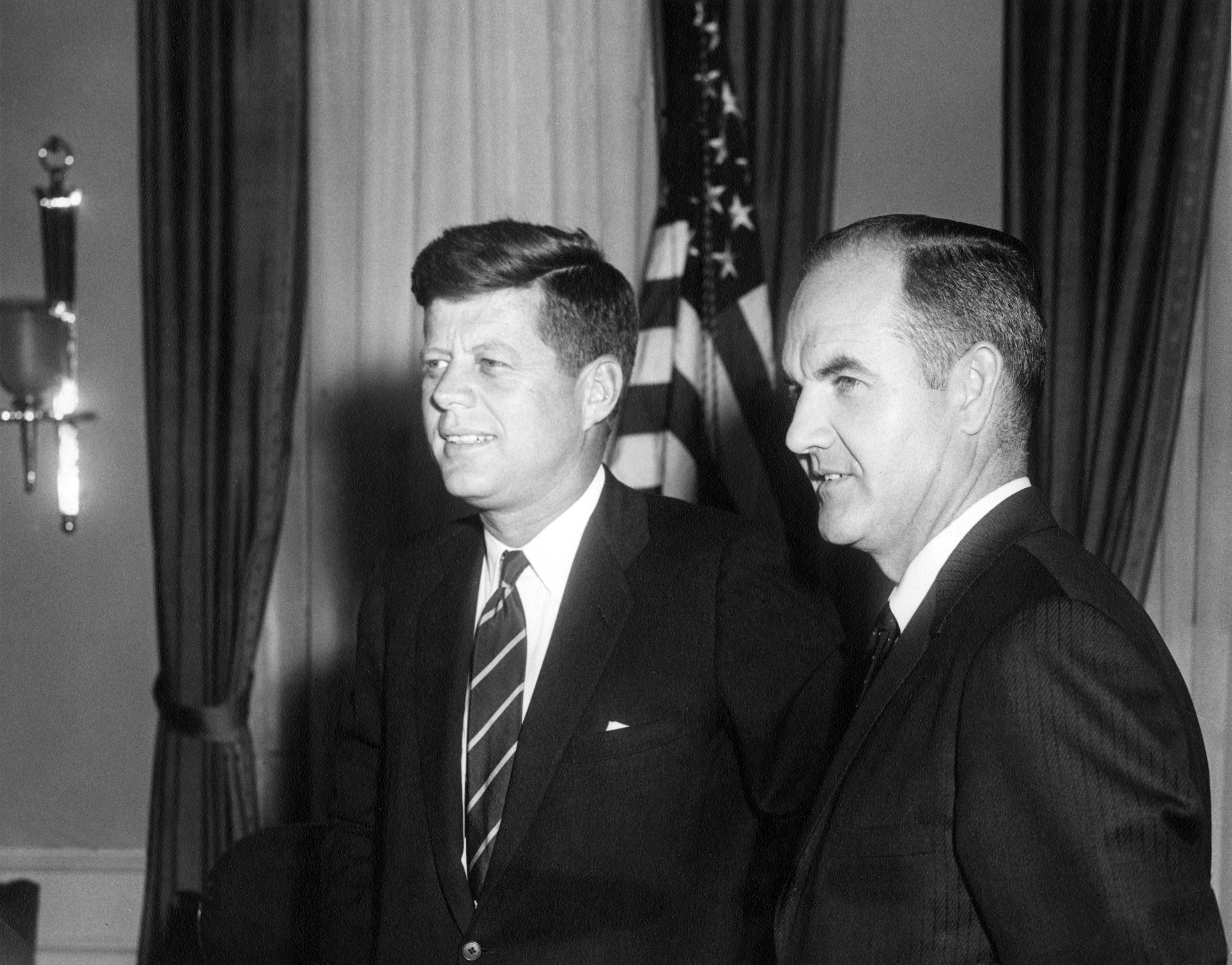
George McGovern as Food for Peace director in 1961, with President John F. Kennedy

In 1961, President John F. Kennedy termed the law "Food for Peace," stating, "Food is strength, and food is peace, and food is freedom, and food is a helping hand to people around the world whose good will and friendship we want." Through new amendments, the law switched its focus from disposing of surplus agricultural commodities to addressing humanitarian needs and responding to growing food crisis demands. In signing the extension of the Agricultural Trade Development and Assistance Act in 1959, President Eisenhower criticized the shortcomings of the amendment. He specifically referred to the extension as the Food for Peace program. Although Kennedy may have expanded the program, he was not the first to refer to the program as Food for Peace.

Former U.S. Representative from South Dakota George McGovern was picked to become a Special Assistant to the President and first director of Kennedy's high-priority Food for Peace program, which realized what McGovern had been advocating in the House. McGovern assumed the post on January 21, 1961.

As director, McGovern urged the greater use of food to enable foreign economic development, saying, "We should thank God that we have a food abundance and use the over-supply among the under-privileged at home and abroad." He found space for the program in the Executive Office Building rather than be subservient to either the U.S. Department of State or U.S. Department of Agriculture. McGovern worked with deputy director James W. Symington and Kennedy advisor Arthur M. Schlesinger, Jr. in visiting South America to discuss surplus grain distribution, and attended meetings of the United Nations' Food and Agriculture Organization.

By the close of 1961, the Food for Peace program was operating in a dozen countries, and 10 million more people had been fed with American surplus than the year before. In February 1962, McGovern visited India and oversaw a greatly expanded school lunch program thanks to Food for Peace; subsequently one in five Indian schoolchildren would be fed from it, and by mid-1962, 35 million children around the world. During an audience in Rome, Pope John XXIII warmly praised McGovern's work.

McGovern resigned his post on July 18, 1962, wanting to resume his electoral political career. Kennedy said that under McGovern, the program had "become a vital force in the world", improving living conditions and economies of allies and creating "a powerful barrier to the spread of Communism". Columnist Drew Pearson wrote that it was one of the "most spectacular achievements of the young Kennedy administration," while Schlesinger would later write that Food for Peace had been "the greatest unseen weapon of Kennedy's third-world policy".

McGovern was succeeded by Richard W. Reuter, who had been the executive director of CARE. In 1965, during the Lyndon B. Johnson administration, the program was folded into the State Department under Secretary Dean Rusk. A year later Reuther resigned his retitled position of Special Assistant to the Secretary of State for Food for Peace, reportedly dismayed by the direction the food program had taken.

The Food for Peace Act of 1966, P.L. 89-808, 80 Stat. 1526, revised the basic structure of the programs and placed the emphasis clearly on the humanitarian goals of the program. The policy statement shifted from surplus disposal to planned production for export to meet world food needs.

=== Food, Agriculture, Conservation, and Trade Act (1990) ===
In 1990, the U.S. Congress passed, and President George H. W. Bush signed into law the first comprehensive restatement and reorganization of P.L. 480 in the Food, Agriculture, Conservation and Trade Act (the 1990 Farm Bill). This bill made a significant change in the overall focus of P.L. 480. Once seen as simply an aspect of foreign policy, P.L. 480 now has food security as a primary goal.

=== Food for Peace Act (2008) ===
In 2008, the Food for Peace Act, (Pub. L. 110–246 (text) (PDF)) formally replaced the Agricultural Trade Development and Assistance Act. Programs are authorized, along with all U.S. agricultural programs, through the Farm Bill which Congress typically amends and reauthorizes every five years.

=== Provisions ===
The purpose of the Food for Peace Act is to:

- Combat world hunger and malnutrition and their causes
- Promote broad-based, equitable and sustainable development, including agricultural development
- Expand international trade
- Foster and encourage the development of private enterprise and democratic participation in developing countries
- Prevent conflicts

The Food for Peace Act includes four sections, referred to as titles, which regulate food aid commodities and development and relief support. The United States Department of Agriculture (USDA) manages Title I, while USAID manages Titles II, III and V.

- Title I: Economic Assistance and Food Security—governs concessional sales of U.S. agricultural commodities to developing countries and private entities
- Title II: Emergency and Private Assistance Programs—provide for the direct donation of U.S. agricultural commodities for emergency relief and development programs
- Title III: Food for Development—provides government-to-government grants of agricultural commodities, which are tied to policy reform
- Title IV: General Authorities and Requirements – establishes prohibited uses including no aid to human rights violators, no aid to military, and no competition with U.S. producers
- Title V: John Ogonowski and Doug Bereuter Farmer-to-Farmer (FTF) Program—-provides voluntary technical assistance to farmers, farm groups, and agribusinesses.
- Title VI: Enterprise for the America's Initiative – official debt relief linking Food for Peace and AID debt owed to the United States to the promulgation of structural adjustment and open investment policies

==== Title I: Economic Assistance and Food Security (USDA) ====
The Title I authority of the Food for Peace Act is administered by the U.S. Department of Agriculture (USDA) and provides funding for a concessional sales program and the Food for Progress grant program.

The concessional sales program supports trade and development. The primary objective of the concessional sales component is to provide food assistance to targeted developing countries to promote economic growth. The 1996 Farm Bill modified Title I concessional loans to allow USDA to enter into loan agreements with private entities in addition to its government-to-government mandate. As a result, the new goal of the Title I program was to prioritize areas that had the potential to become commercial markets for U.S. agricultural commodities.

Food for Progress authorizes the Commodity Credit Corporation (CCC) to finance the sale and export of agricultural commodities to development countries and emerging democracies on credit terms, or on a grant basis, to support developing countries and countries that are emerging democracies and have made commitments to introduce or expand free enterprise elements into their agricultural economies.

Since fiscal year 2006, new funding has not been requested because demand for food assistance using credit financing has fallen or grant programs have been a more appropriate tool.

==== Title II: Emergency and Development Food Assistance Programs (USAID) ====
Title II is administered by the USAID Office of Food for Peace as authorized in the Food for Peace Act which states

the Administrator may provide agricultural commodities to meet emergency food needs under this title through governments and public or private agencies […] The Administrator may provide agricultural commodities for nonemergency assistance under this title through eligible organizations.

It authorizes use of U.S. agricultural commodities for both emergency and development food assistance programs to:

- Address famine or other urgent relief requirements
- Combat malnutrition
- Alleviate the causes of hunger, mortality, and morbidity
- Promote economic and community development
- Promote sound environmental practices
- Carry out feeding programs

Title II emergency and development programs have provided more than 106 million metric tons of commodities to more than 3 billion people in 150 countries. Title II programs respond to emergencies and focus on reducing food insecurity in vulnerable populations as well as improving resilience to shocks, by incorporating many activities to strengthen local capacity to prevent and respond to natural disasters.

Since 2011, the Office of Food for Peace has begun work to reformulate its food commodities to make them more nutritious. These reformulated products are used for both emergency and development programs.

==== Title III: Food for Development (USAID) ====
The Food for Peace Title III program is a USAID-administered tool for enhancing food security and supporting long-term economic development in the least-developed countries. When funded, the USG donates agricultural commodities to the recipient country and funds their transportation to the point of entry in the recipient country. These commodities are sold on the domestic market and the revenue generated from their sale is used to support and implement economic development and food security programs.

Funds were last requested or appropriated for Title III before 2000.

==== Title IV: General Authorities and Requirements ====
Title IV of the Food for Peace Act authorizes active participation of the private sector in storage, marketing, transport and distribution. It requires multi-year agreements and an annual report to Congress. Title IV also contains debt forgiveness provisions and establishes the prohibited uses of food aid, which are:

- No aid to human rights violators (can be waived in emergency situations)
- No aid to military
- No competition with U.S. producers

==== Title V: John Ogonowski and Doug Bereuter Farmer-to-Farmer (F2F) Program (USAID) ====
Title V funds the Farmer-to-Farmer Program which was authorized in the Food Security Act of 1985. The U.S. Congress authorized the FY 2008-2012 phase of the Farmer-to-Farmer Program in the 2008 Food for Peace Act, designating it the "John Ogonowski and Doug Bereuter Farmer-to-Farmer Program" in honor of Ogonowski, one of the pilots killed on September 11, 2001, and former Congressman Bereuter, who initially sponsored the program.

The Farmer-to-Farmer Program provides voluntary technical assistance to farmers, farm groups and agribusinesses in developing and transitional countries to promote sustainable improvements in food processing, production and marketing. The program relies on the expertise of volunteers from U.S. farms, land grant universities, cooperatives, private agribusinesses and nonprofit farm organizations to respond to the needs of host-country farmers and organizations.

==== Title VI: Enterprise for the America's Initiative ====
Title VI of the Food for Peace Act authorizes official debt relief. It links Food for Peace and AID debt owed to the United States to the promulgation of structural adjustment and open investment policies. Title VI is administered by the Department of the Treasury.

== Related legislation ==
- Food for Progress Act of 1985—allows for commodity donations to be available to emerging democracies and developing countries committed to the introduction or expansion of free enterprise in their agricultural economies.
- Section 416 of the Agricultural Act of 1949—establishes the McGovern-Dole International Food for Education and Child Nutrition Program which consists of donations of U.S. agricultural products, as well as financial and technical assistance, for school feeding and maternal and child nutrition projects in low-income countries. It also provides for overseas donations of surplus food and feed grain owned by the USDA Commodity Credit Corporation (CCC).
- Africa: Seeds of Hope Act of 1988: Bill Emerson Humanitarian Trust—creates a food reserve administered under the authority of the Secretary of Agriculture. This reserve is available to meet emergency humanitarian food needs in developing countries, allowing the United States to respond to unanticipated food crises. Under the 2008 Food for Peace Act, the Administrator of USAID oversees release and use of these funds.

== Food for Peace programs ==
=== Emergency programs ===
USAID's Office of Food for Peace manages two programs to support emergency food assistance efforts. Emergency programs authorized under Title II of the Food for Peace Act provide in-kind commodities and associated costs. Emergency programs implemented by Food for Peace using International Disaster Assistance Funds (called the Emergency Food Security Program, or EFSP) provide cash that can be used for local and regional purchase of food and other interventions such as food vouchers and cash transfers. Title II is authorized by the Food for Peace Act, while EFSP is authorized under the Foreign Assistance Act (FAA). EFSP is deployed to respond to the highest priority emergency food security needs as a complement to Title II in-kind food aid. Both programs provide emergency food assistance to address needs arising from natural disasters, such as floods or droughts, and complex emergencies, which are often characterized by insecurity and population displacement.

=== Development programs ===
The Office of Food for Peace manages development food assistance programs through Title II of the Food for Peace Act, which target the underlying causes of hunger and malnutrition, including interventions in health and nutrition, agriculture, and water and sanitation, among others. These programs focus on approximately 20 priority countries determined based on the weighted average of the country ranking under three food security indicators:

- Percent of children stunted
- Percent of population living on less than $1.25 per day
- Percent of population undernourished

Additional considerations such as security conditions also factor into countries selected.

==== International Food Relief Partnership (IFRP) ====
The International Food Relief Partnership (IFRP) is a sub-program of Title II food assistance. IFRP provides small grants to predominantly faith-based groups working on nutritional support programs. IFRP allows for the transportation, delivery, and distribution of shelf-stable prepackaged foods overseas and the establishment and maintenance of stockpiles of the foods in the United States.

== Famine Early Warning Systems Network (FEWS NET) ==
USAID's Famine Early Warning Systems Network (FEWS NET) works with other U.S. government agencies to monitor, collect, analyze and disseminate critical data and information on conditions of food availability and access in the most food insecure countries. These agencies include the U.S. Geological Survey, National Aeronautics and Space Administration (NASA), National Oceanic and Atmospheric Administration, and U.S. Department of Agriculture. FEWS NET provides decision-makers in the U.S. Government, host country governments, and a variety of other regional and international partners timely, unbiased, and insightful early warning and vulnerability information.

== Bibliography ==
- Anson, Robert Sam (1972), McGovern: A Biography, Dopesa, ISBN 978-0-03-091345-7
- Knock, Thomas J. (2000), "Feeding the World and Thwarting Communists", in David F. Schmitz; T. Christopher Jespersen (eds.), Architects of the American Century: Individuals and Institutions in Twentieth-century U.S. Foreign Policymaking, Imprint Publications, ISBN 978-1-879176-35-5
