= 1991 hurricane season =

1991 hurricane season may refer to:

- The 1991 Atlantic hurricane season
- The 1991 Pacific hurricane season
