= Port of Coatzacoalcos =

Coatzacoalcos
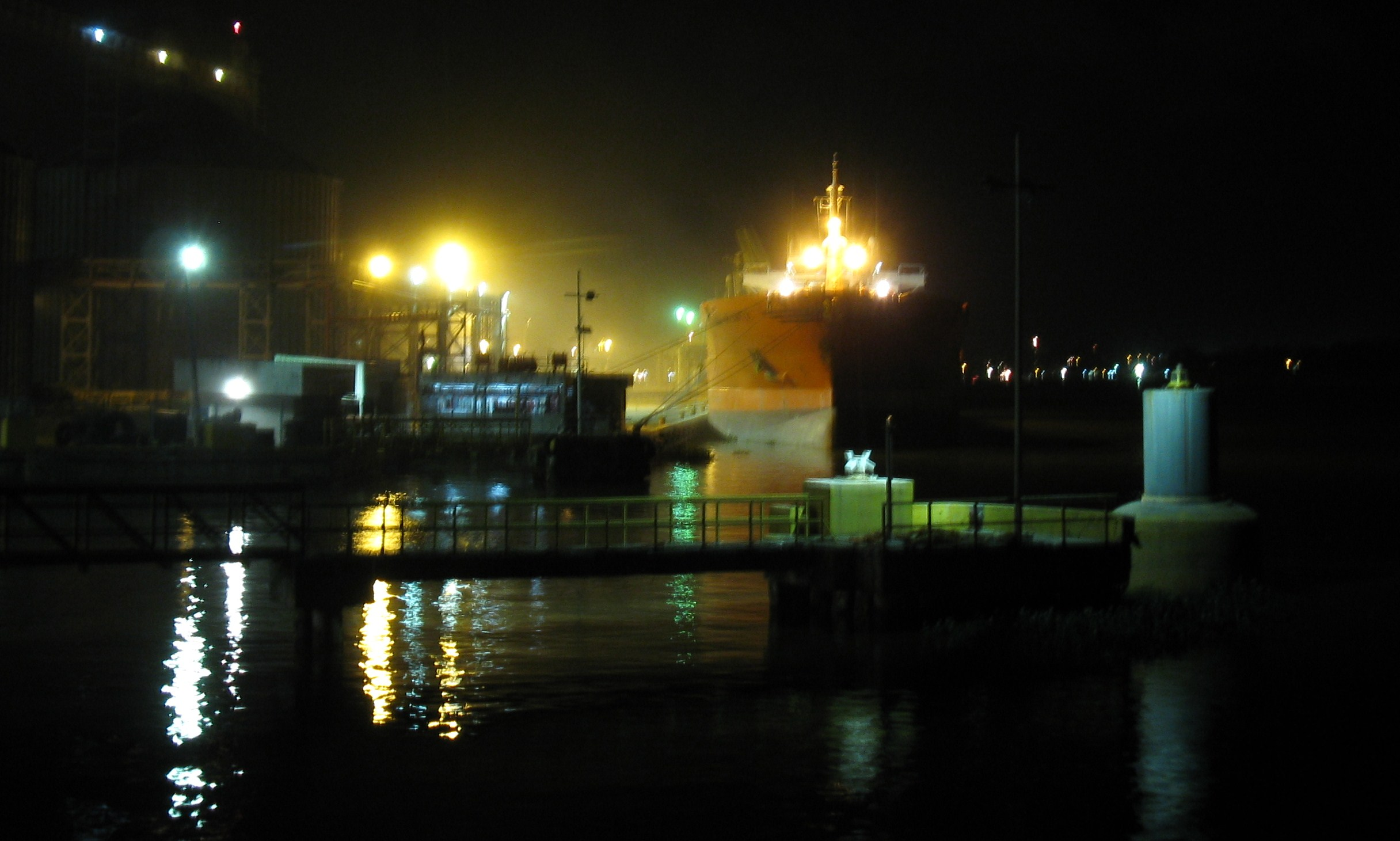
- Click on the map for a fullscreen view
- Location in Mexico

Location
- Country: Mexico
- Location: Coatzacoalcos, Veracruz
- Coordinates: 18°07′N 94°25′W
- UN/LOCODE: MXCOA

Details
- No. of berths: 28
- Draft depth: 14.0 metres (45.9 ft)

Statistics
- Website puertocoatzacoalcos.com.mx

The Port of Coatzacoalcos or Puerto México is an important port facility on Mexico's east coast. It is located at Coatzacoalcos, Veracruz, at the southernmost point of the Gulf of Campeche.

Mexico’s largest port by cargo volume, Coatzacoalcos mainly handles bulk cargoes, both liquid and dry bulk.

It is the northern/Caribbean/Gulf of Mexico/Atlantic terminus of the 303km rail and industrial park Interoceanic Corridor of the Isthmus of Tehuantepec which connects it to Port of Salina Cruz on the Pacific Ocean.
