= Port of Salina Cruz =

Salina Cruz
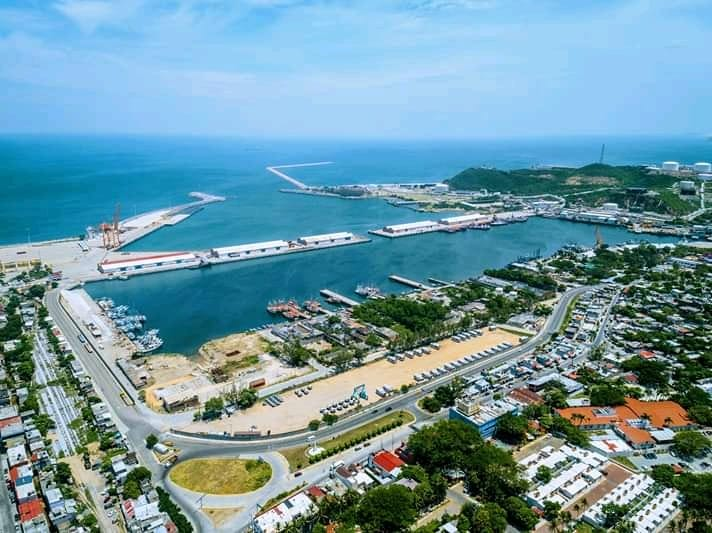
- Port of Salina Cruz in 2021
- Click on the map for a fullscreen view
- Location in Mexico

Location
- Country: Mexico
- Location: Salina Cruz, Oaxaca
- Coordinates: 16°10′N 95°12′W
- UN/LOCODE: MXSCX

Details
- No. of berths: 17
- Draft depth: 24.0 metres (78.7 ft)

Statistics
- Website www.puertosalinacruz.com.mx

The Port of Salina Cruz is a port facility located at Salina Cruz, Oaxaca, on Mexico's Pacific coast. It stands on the Gulf of Tehuantepec, at the southern extreme of the isthmus of the same name.

Although mainly a tanker port, Salina Cruz also handles breakbulk and containers.

It is the Pacific Ocean terminus of the 303km rail and industrial park Interoceanic Corridor of the Isthmus of Tehuantepec which connects it to Port of Coatzacoalcos on the Caribbean/Gulf of Mexico/Atlantic Ocean.
