= 1991 Pacific hurricane season =

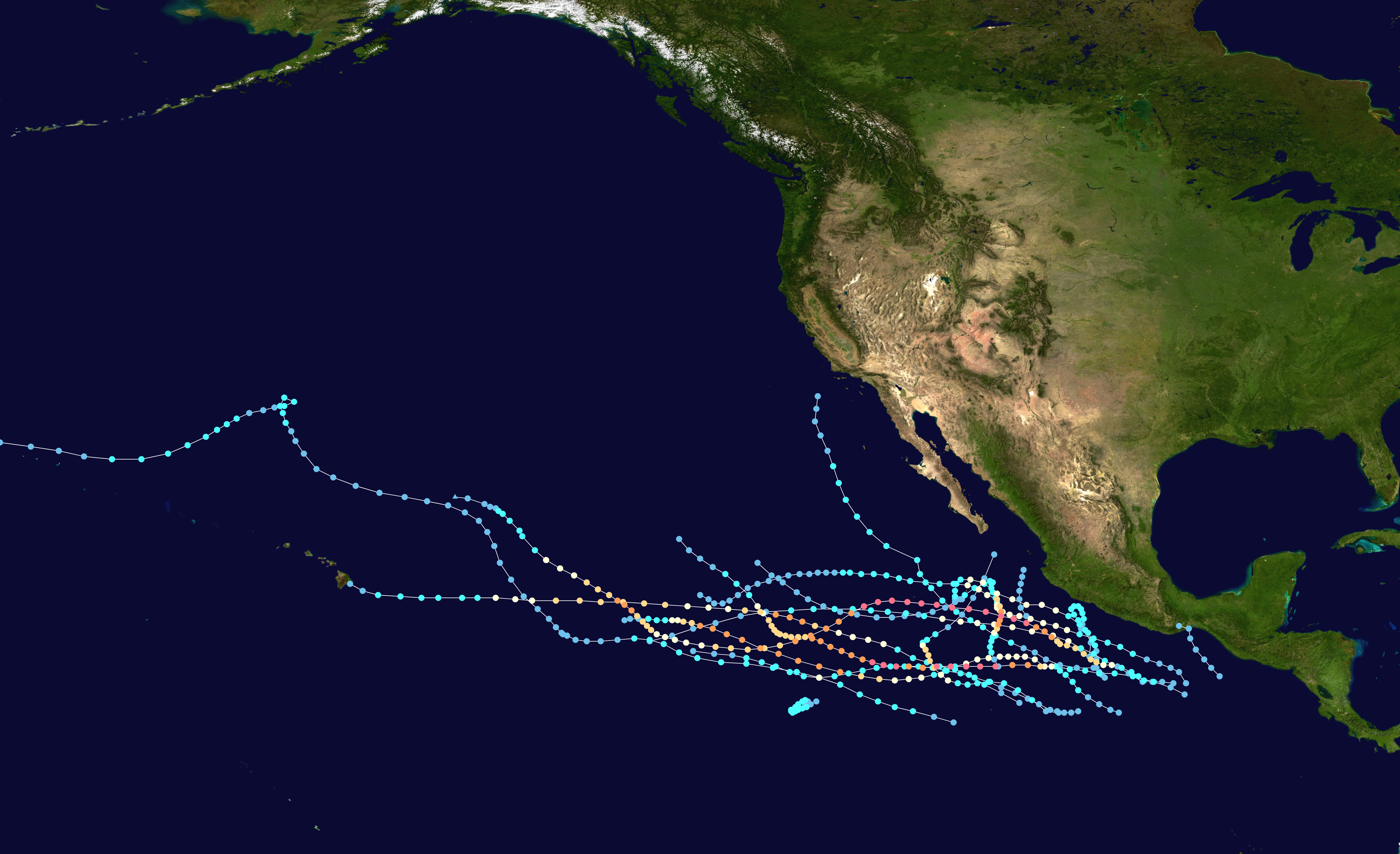
- Season summary map

Seasonal boundaries
- First system formed: May 16, 1991
- Last system dissipated: November 12, 1991

Strongest storm
- Name: Kevin
  - Maximum winds: 145 mph (230 km/h) (1-minute sustained)
  - Lowest pressure: 935 mbar (hPa; 27.61 inHg)

Seasonal statistics
- Total depressions: 16
- Total storms: 14
- Hurricanes: 10
- Major hurricanes (Cat. 3+): 5
- Total fatalities: 24
- Total damage: Unknown

Related articles
- Timeline of the 1991 Pacific hurricane season; 1991 Atlantic hurricane season; 1991 Pacific typhoon season; 1991 North Indian Ocean cyclone season

The 1991 Pacific hurricane season was a near-average Pacific hurricane season. The worst storm this year was Tropical Storm Ignacio, which killed 23 people in Mexico and injured 40 others. Elsewhere, Hurricane Fefa caused flooding in Hawaii. Hurricane Kevin was the strongest system of the season and became the then longest-lasting hurricane in the eastern north Pacific basin at the time, and Hurricane Nora was the strongest November storm to that point. The season officially started on May 15, 1991, in the eastern Pacific, and on June 1, 1991, in the central Pacific. It lasted until November 30, 1991, in both basins. These dates conventionally delimit the period of each year when most tropical cyclones form in the northeastern Pacific Ocean.

== Seasonal summary ==
During the season, a total of sixteen tropical cyclones developed, featuring ten hurricanes, four tropical storms and two tropical depressions. These totals are close to the climatological averages established since 1966, when satellite surveillance began. However, the season was less active than 1990, which had a record 16 hurricanes (more than 1991). Yet, it ended late with the first November hurricane on record in the satellite era. On the other hand, the months of July and August, often the most active ones in this basin, only produced two tropical cyclones each. The activity in July was four systems below the average of six at that time due to unusual circulation patterns aloft over the tropical Pacific. A shorter gap in activity from late August to early September was attributed to anomalous flow patterns near the Baja California Peninsula. Several tropical cyclones grew into specially long-lived and intense systems. For example, Hurricane Kevin endured as a hurricane for 12.5 days to the east of 140°W, establishing a new record for longevity in the eastern Pacific.

None of the tropical storms or hurricanes made landfall. One of the two tropical depressions of the season, Five-E, came ashore near Salina Cruz, Mexico, on the last day of June. Delores, Ignacio and Marty threatened the coast of Mexico, coming close enough to require tropical cyclone watches and warnings. Of these, Ignacio was also responsible for 40 injuries and 23 fatalities as the system passed just offshore of Lázaro Cárdenas. Public advisories were issued for four other systems due to the threat of heavy rain along the coast.

Tropical cyclone data was gathered at six hour intervals throughout the season. Even though most intensity assessments were estimates via the Dvorak Technique, there was a large research mission for tropical cyclogenesis in the Pacific. A NOAA research mission investigated Hurricane Jimena and gathered a few surface observations. Track forecasts were slightly more accurate than the past three years; intensity forecasts were comparable to the previous three seasons.

== Systems ==
=== Tropical Storm Andres ===
- Tropical storm (SSHWS)
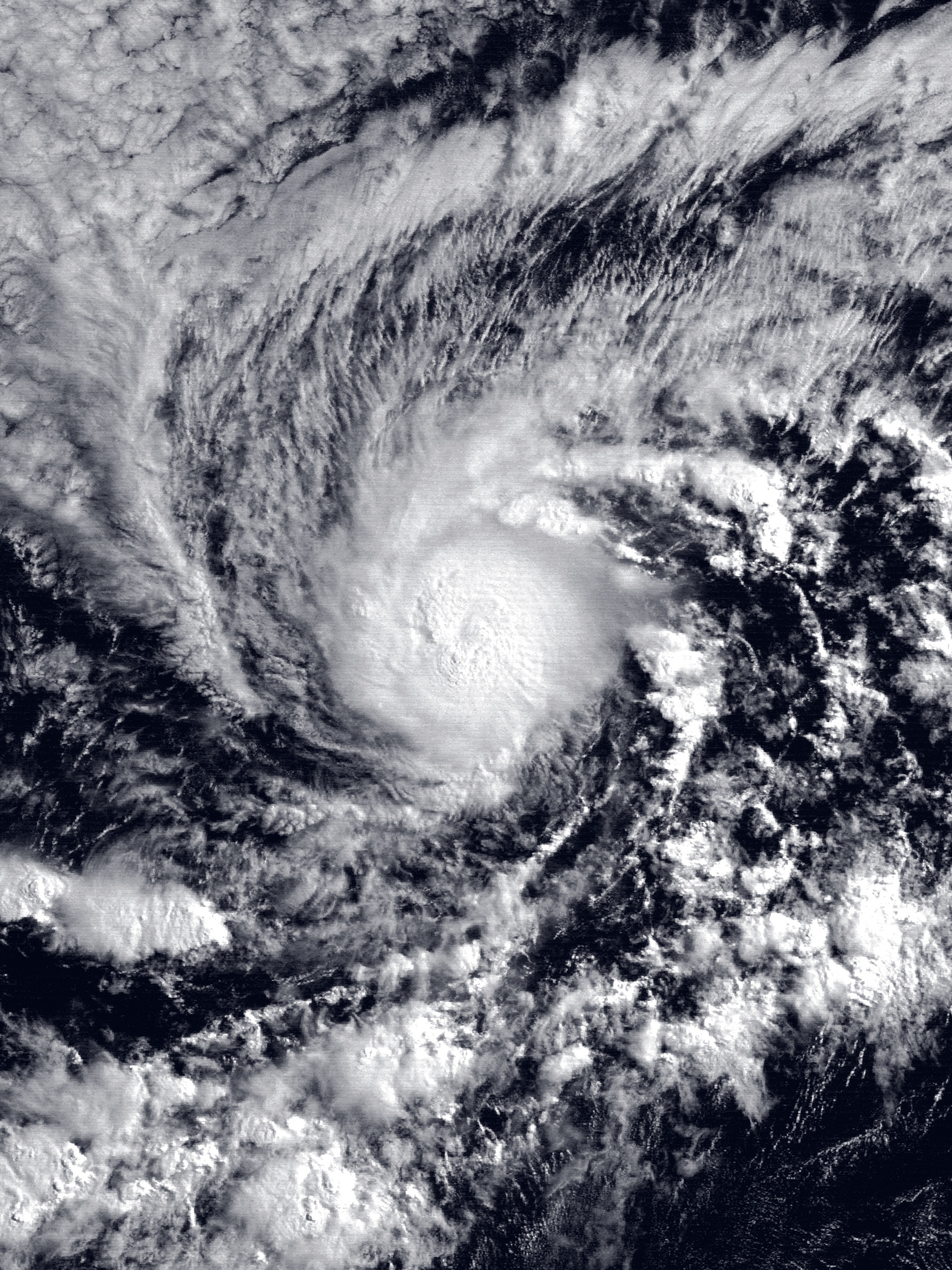
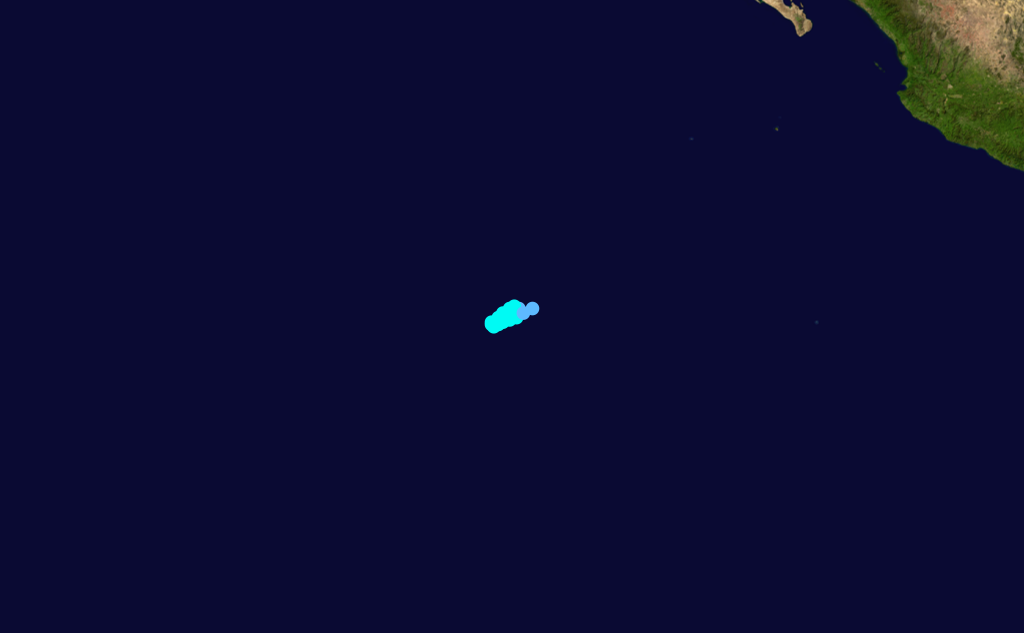
- Duration: May 16 – May 20
- Peak intensity: 65 mph (100 km/h) (1-min); 994 mbar (hPa)

On May 16, the first tropical depression of the season formed to the southwest of Baja California, out of a tropical disturbance that had developed during May 5 within the vicinity of Panama. During May 16 the depression gradually developed, before early the next day the National Hurricane Centre declared it a tropical storm and named it Andres. The newly named tropical cyclone reached its peak intensity of 60 mph (95 km/h), later that day. After maintaining its peak intensity for 24 hours, Andres started to gradually weaken as upper level windshear over the system increased before it dissipated during May 20. Throughout its life as a tropical cyclone, Andres moved very little and slowly executed a cyclonic loop, while remaining well away from any land.

=== Tropical Storm Blanca ===
- Tropical storm (SSHWS)
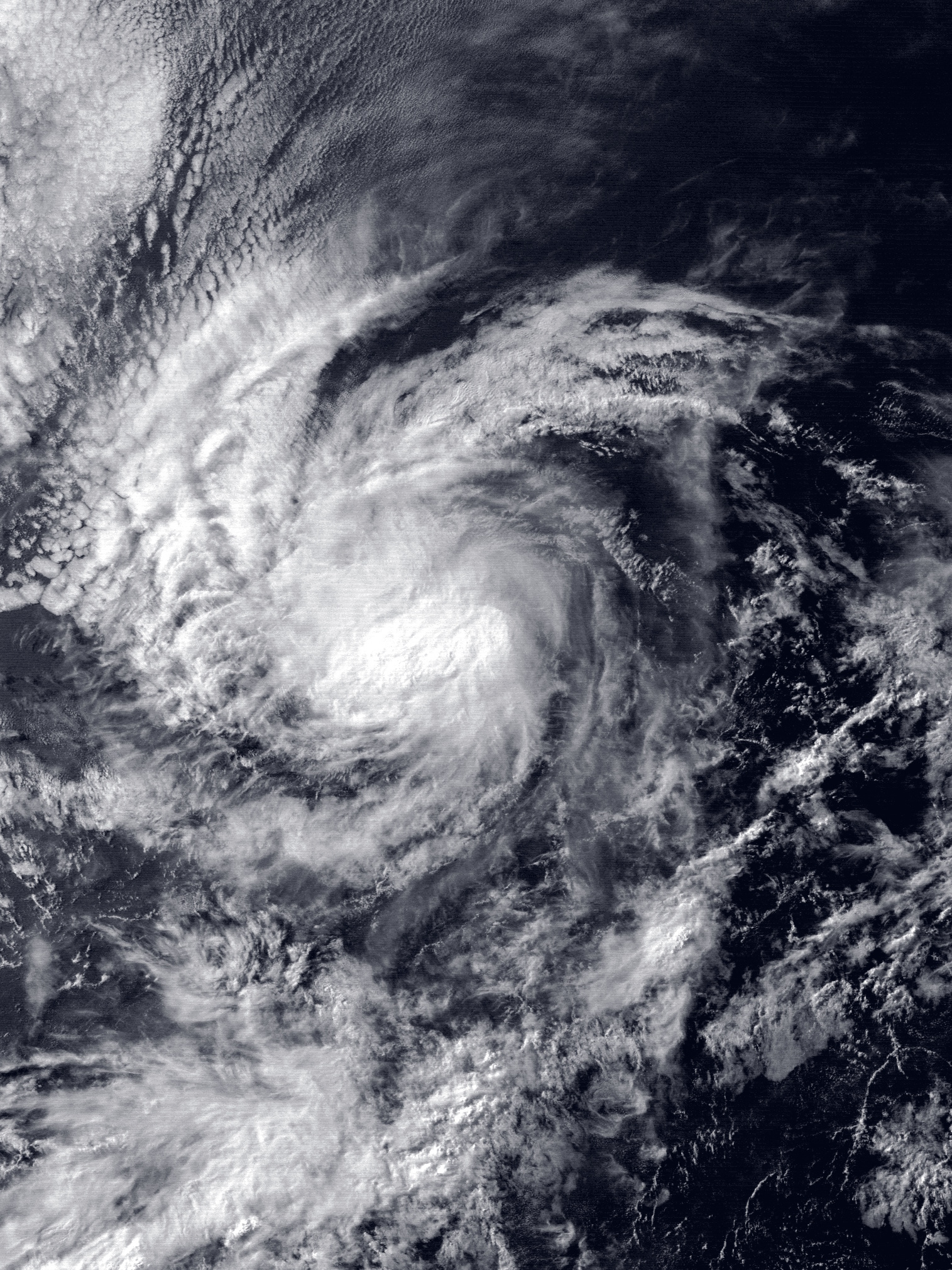
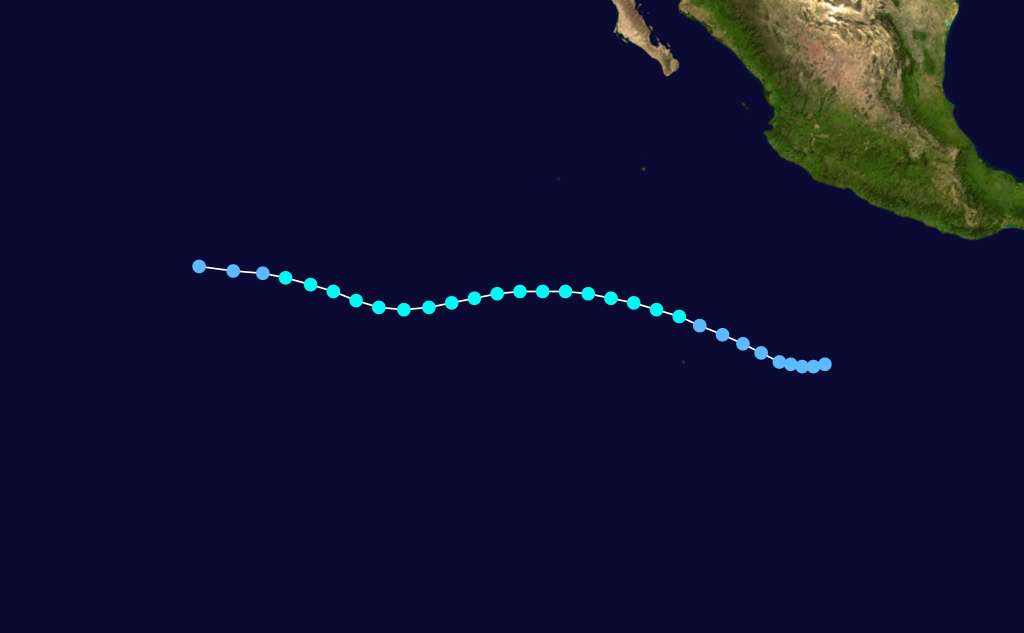
- Duration: June 14 – June 22
- Peak intensity: 65 mph (100 km/h) (1-min); 994 mbar (hPa)

A well organized tropical wave over West Africa entered the Atlantic Ocean on May 31. The wave never showed signs of organization while crossing the Atlantic. It emerged into the eastern north Pacific on June 10. It was not until June 13 when the convection associated with the wave became better organized. On June 14, Tropical Depression Two-E formed at a location about 515 mi (830 km) from Acapulco, Mexico.

For the next 48 hours, the depression moved toward the west and then northwest in response to a weakening ridge to the northwest. On June 17, the strong shear relaxed somewhat and the exposed center moved under the deep convection again. Thus, the depression strengthened into a tropical storm about 725 mi (1,165 km) south of the southern tip of Baja California. Tropical Storm Blanca experienced limited development, reaching its peak windspeed of 60 mph (95 km/h) early on June 20. Then, the center of Blanca became exposed again and weakened into a tropical depression on June 21. Finally, it dissipated on June 22 over colder waters about 1285 mi (2,380 km) southwest of the southern tip of Baja California. There were no casualties or damages attributed to this tropical cyclone.

=== Hurricane Carlos ===
- Category 3 hurricane (SSHWS)
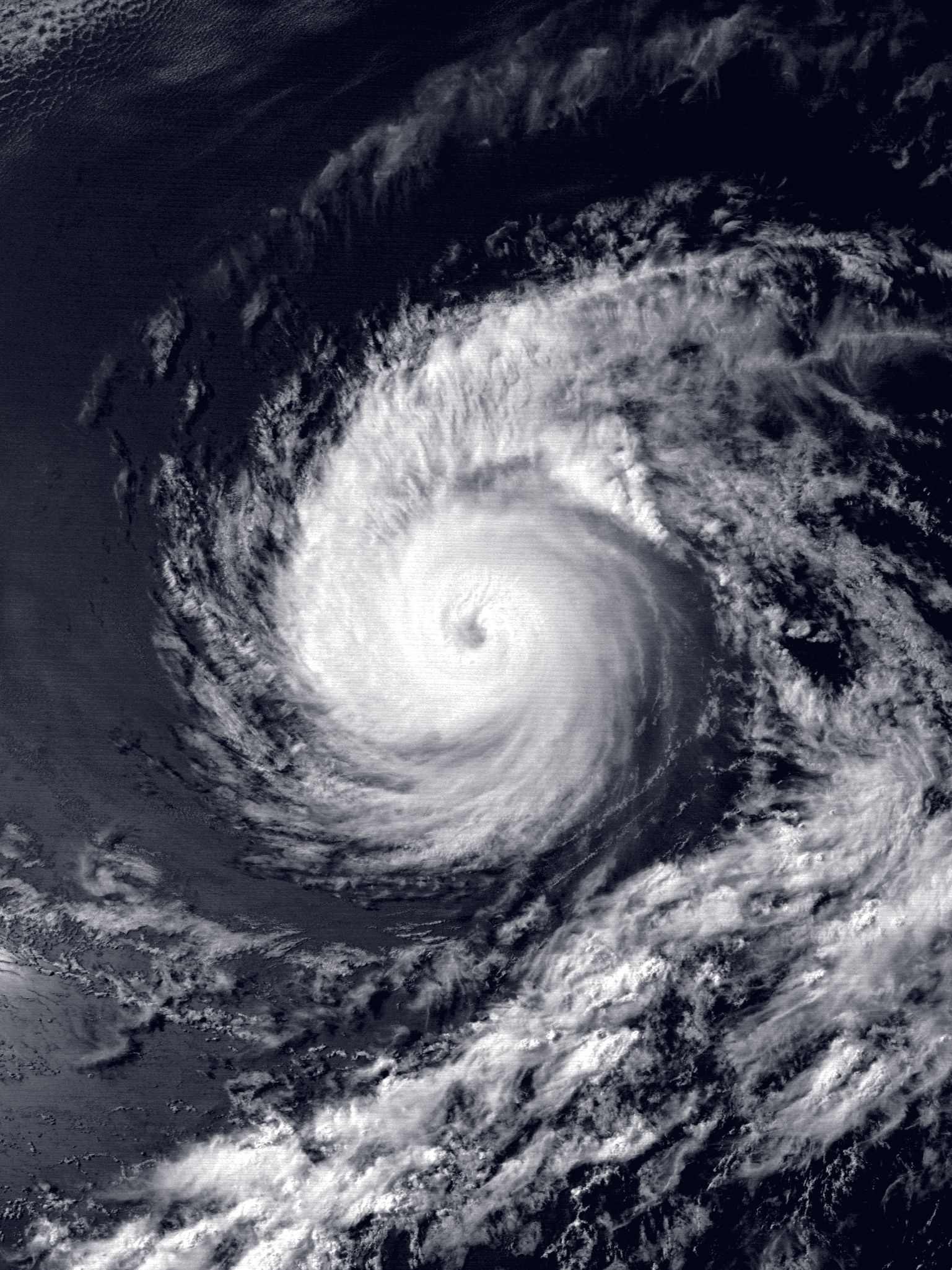
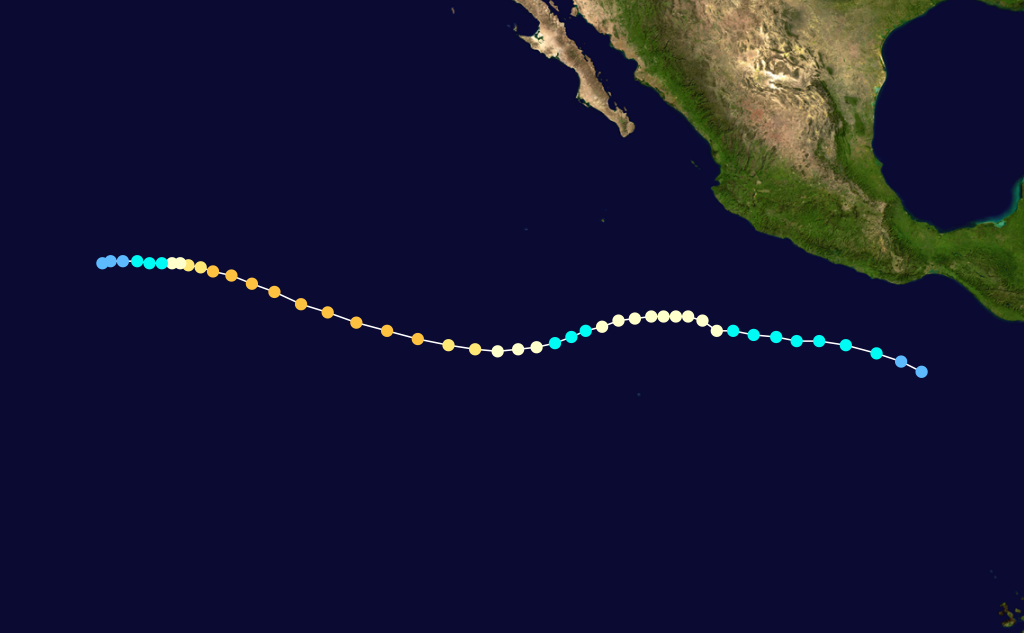
- Duration: June 16 – June 27
- Peak intensity: 120 mph (195 km/h) (1-min); 955 mbar (hPa)

A tropical wave moved off the coast of West Africa on June 4 showing some cyclonic curvature in the low clouds. It passed Barbados six days later, where a low-to-mid wind shift was detected. The wave was followed by a low level wind surge which was observed in Curaçao on June 12. Most of the shower activity associated with the wave moved westward over South America, and then over Panama on June 14. The convection became organized and developed into Tropical Depression Three-E on June 16 while it was located 350 mi (560 km) south of Salina Cruz. It became a tropical storm one day later. Carlos reached minimal hurricane strength on June 18. Two days later, Carlos was briefly downgraded to tropical storm status. A strong high pressure system forced Carlos to move over warmer waters and Carlos began to reintensify. Carlos regained hurricane status and developed a well-defined eye and excellent upper level outflow. On June 24, Carlos peaked at 955 mbar (28.2 inHg) central pressure and 115 mph (185 km/h) maximum sustained winds. The hurricane then weakened when it moved west over colder waters and encountered upper-level shear. Carlos dissipated on June 27. The National Hurricane Center received no reports of impact due to this tropical cyclone.

=== Hurricane Delores ===
- Category 1 hurricane (SSHWS)
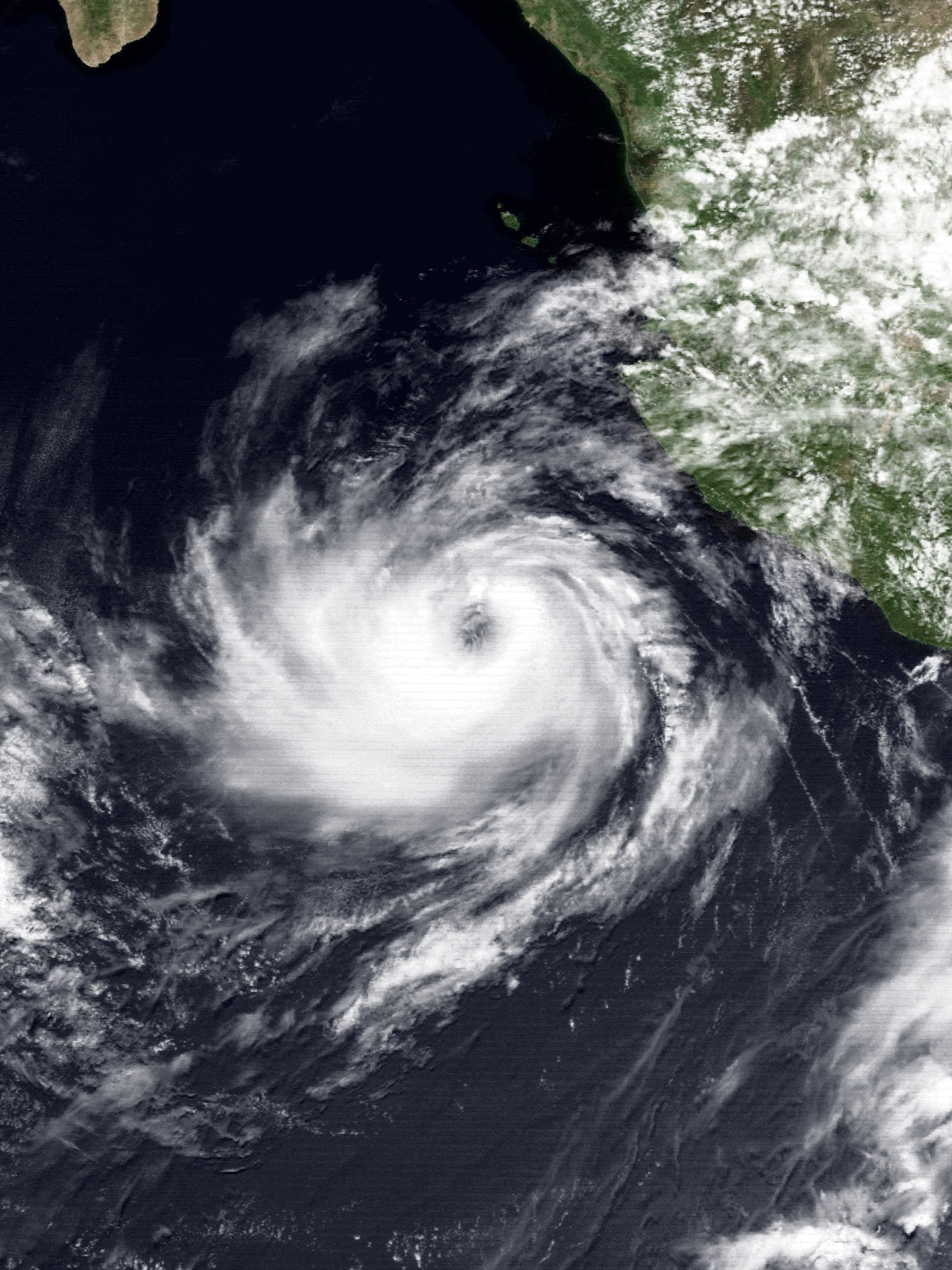
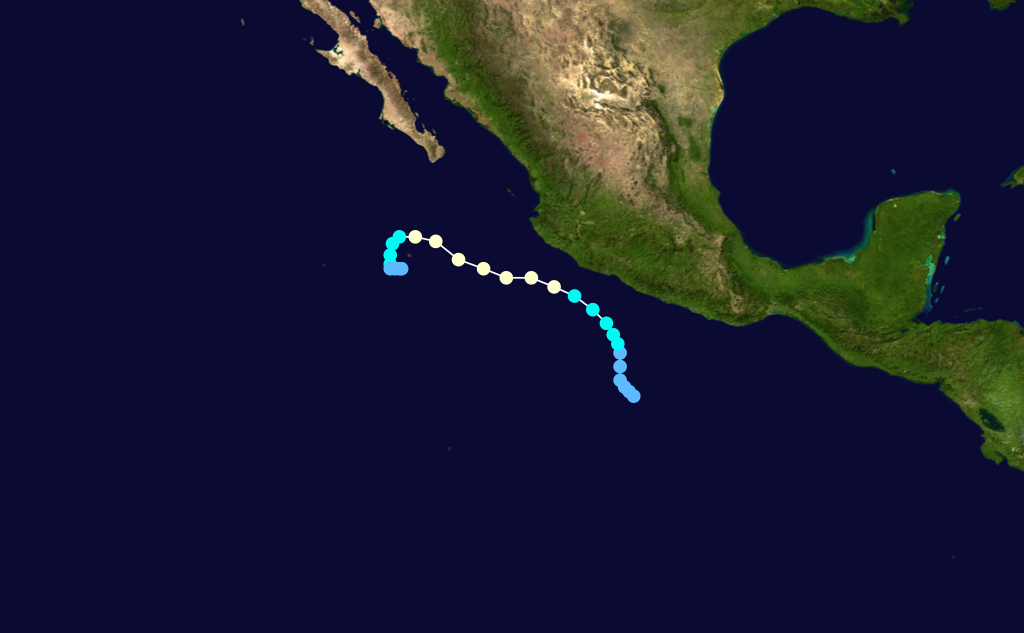
- Duration: June 22 – June 28
- Peak intensity: 85 mph (140 km/h) (1-min); 979 mbar (hPa)

Delores developed from a tropical wave which moved from Africa to the Atlantic on June 7. And it was not until June 22 when it gained organization and was identified as an area of disturbed weather south of Mexico.

The system immediately showed signs of rotation and it was designated Tropical Depression Four-E the same day. It was centered about 515 mi (830 km) south-southeast of Manzanillo, Mexico. Then, the depression reached storm strength, and was named Delores on June 24 while 145 mi (230 km) from the coast of Mexico. It rapidly intensified to a hurricane on June 25 as it approached to the coast. However it rapidly weakened and on June 27 it was downgraded to tropical storm status as it was moving over colder waters. Its deep convection gradually diminished and its west-northwestward motion abruptly halted as the system was being sheared. It weakened to a depression on June 28 near Socorro Island and it dissipated on June 29.

In response to Delores' approach, the Mexican government issued a tropical storm warning and a hurricane watch from Ixtapa to Manzanillo on June 24. The watch and the warning were dropped the next day. The cyclone remained far away enough that no reports of high winds were received. Satellite observations indicated that heavy rains fell in affected areas from June 23 to 26. However, no damages or casualties were reported.

=== Tropical Depression Five-E ===
- Tropical depression (SSHWS)
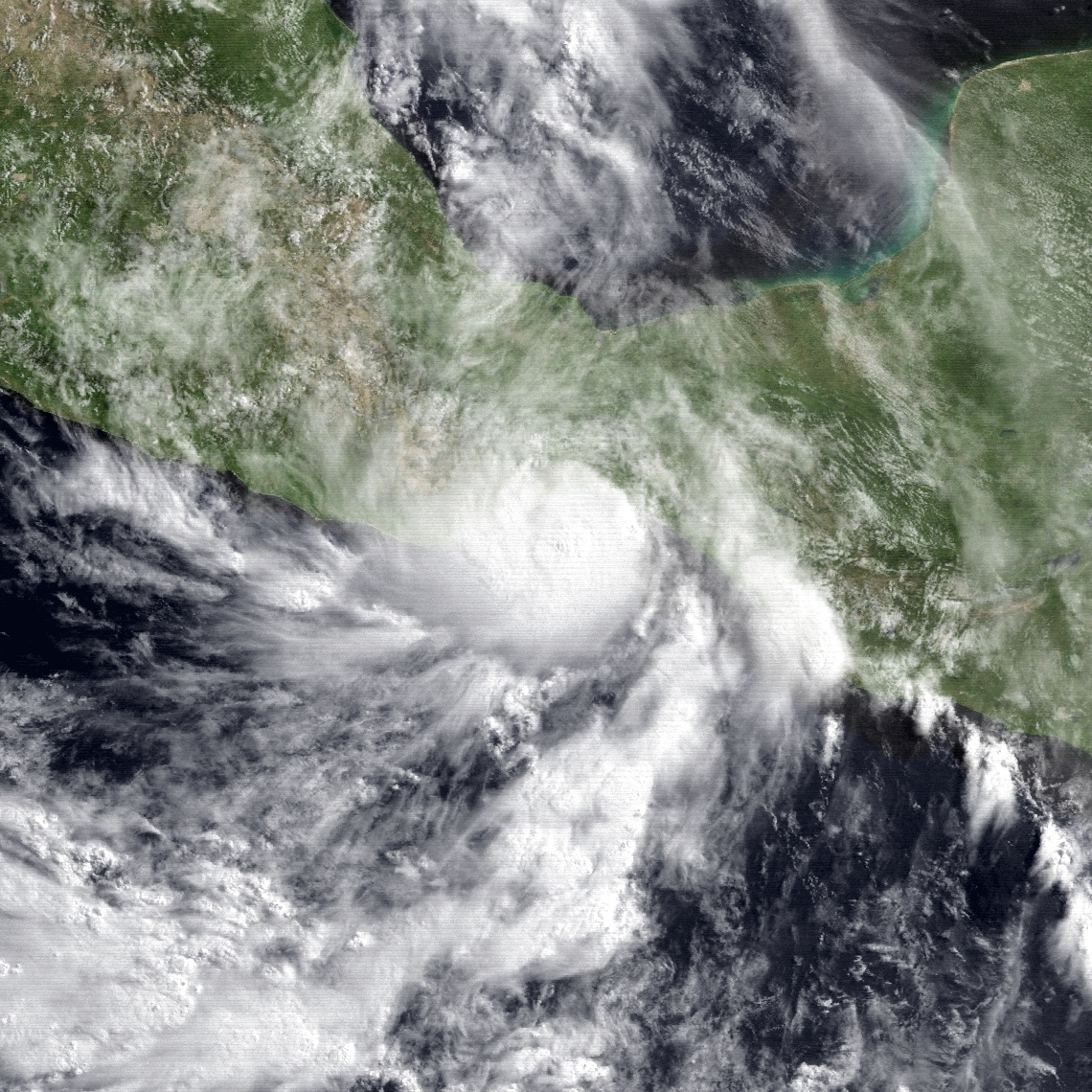
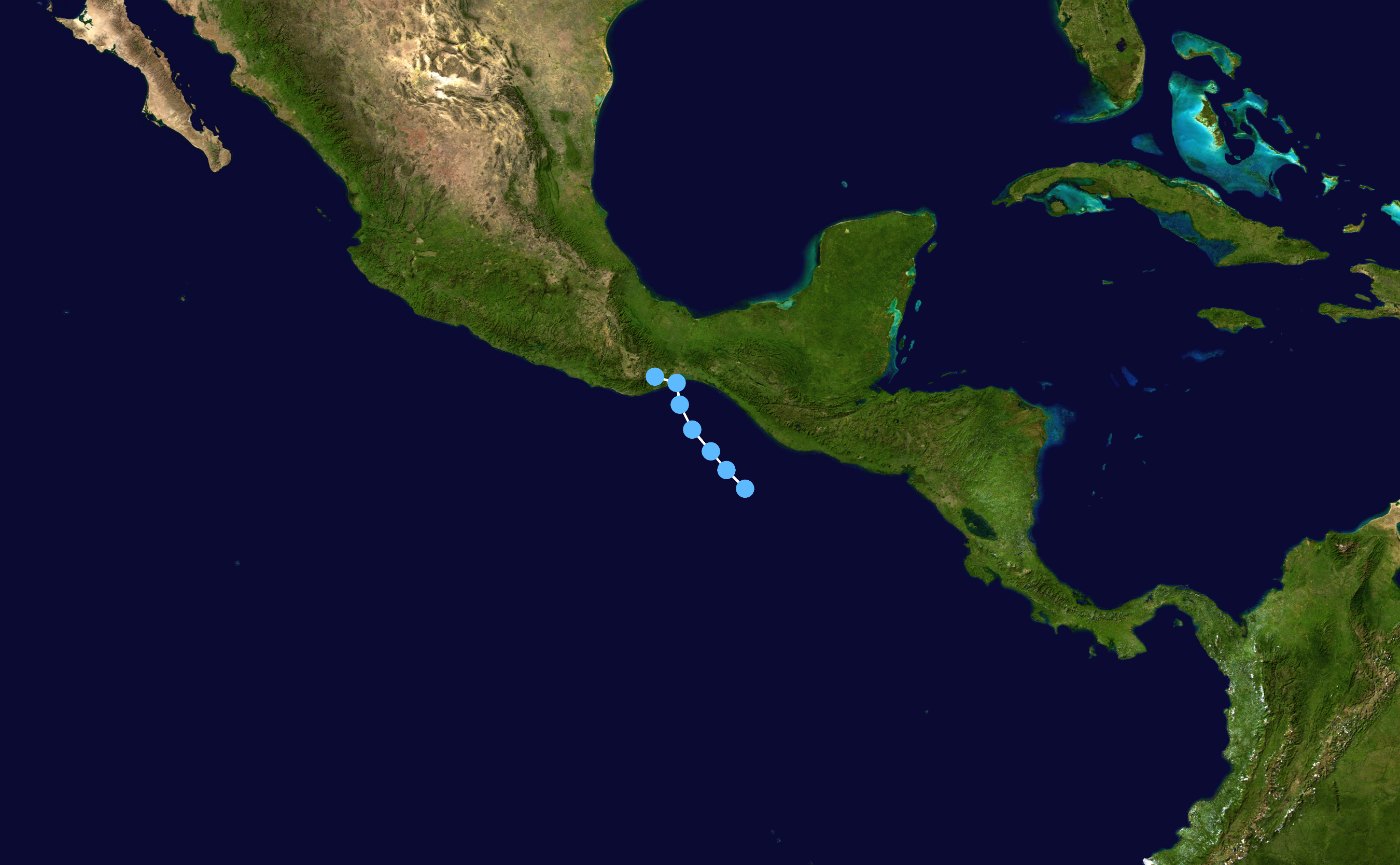
- Duration: June 28 – June 30
- Peak intensity: 35 mph (55 km/h) (1-min); 1006 mbar (hPa)

A tropical disturbance south of the Gulf of Tehuantepec became better organized on June 29 and became a tropical depression. Strengthening was very limited as the depression was approaching land. It made landfall later that day very near Salina Cruz, Oaxaca. As it continued its west-northwest track, it dissipated inland after bringing torrential rains.

Five-E caused one fatality and some significant damage. Five-E destroyed up to 118 homes, injured 500, and also caused two people to go missing. Rainfall totals as high as 9.2 inches (230 mm) in 24 hours accompanied the depression over Southern Mexico.

=== Hurricane Enrique ===
- Category 1 hurricane (SSHWS)
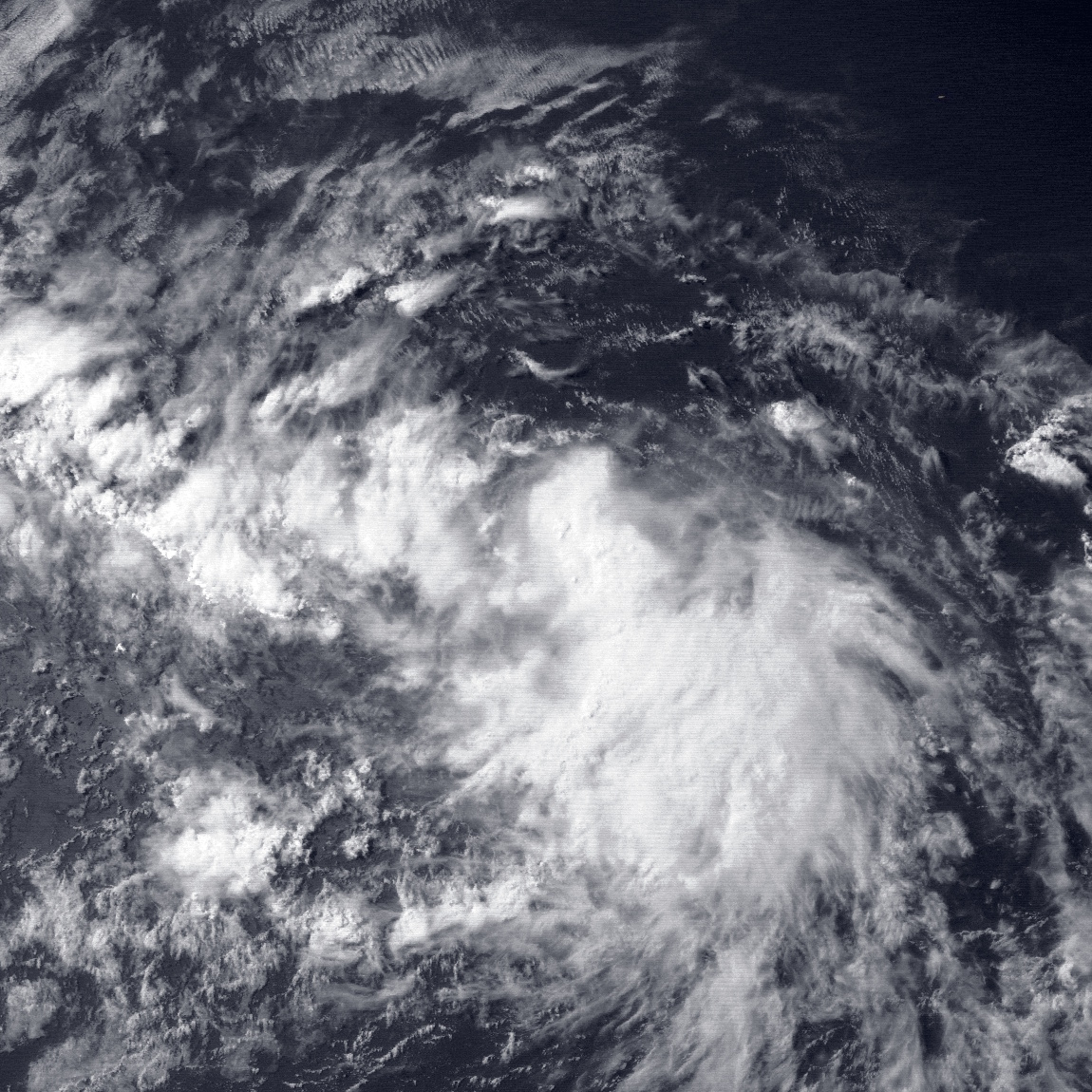
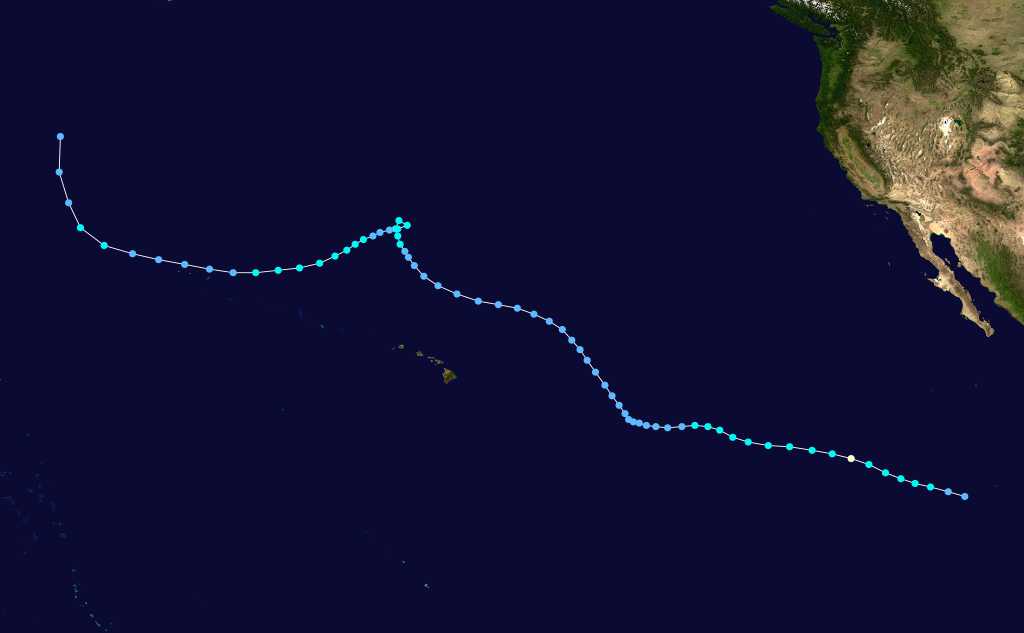
- Duration: July 15 – July 31 (Exited basin)
- Peak intensity: 75 mph (120 km/h) (1-min); 987 mbar (hPa)

Enrique formed from a westward-moving tropical wave that crossed the Atlantic from June 30 to July 8. A short-lived cyclonic circulation center within the wave was detected on satellite imagery when the system was over the eastern Atlantic. However, persistent deep convection did not occur until the wave neared the Gulf of Tehuantepec in the eastern Pacific Ocean on July 11. On July 12, the convection became more concentrated about 500 nmi (575 mi; 925 km) south of Acapulco, near a mid-level vortex within the wave; however, it had diminished the next day. On July 14, it became better organized. Based on reports from satellite imagery the low had developed into the season's sixth tropical depression on July 15. The depression intensified further and was upgraded to Tropical Storm Enrique the next day as it became better organized.

Enrique steadily intensified and by early on July 16, the National Hurricane Center was anticipating for the system to reach hurricane intensity. Continuing to strengthen, it reached hurricane status On July 17. However, this was for a short period of time as it developed an eye. Due to uncertainty in the storm's intensity that day, it is possible that it could have been a hurricane earlier than originally estimated. Wind shear associated with a trough and passage over cooler waters caused Enrique to begin weakening and the cyclone's center soon became exposed. Enrique was downgraded to a depression on July 19 and the weakening cyclone crossed into the central Pacific on July 20. The system persisted drifting northwestward for several days, while maintaining a well-defined, albeit weak, center of circulation. On July 27, after it passed well to the north of the Hawaiian Islands, Enrique managed to briefly re-intensify to tropical storm status, attaining a secondary peak intensity of 50 mph (85 km/h), while completing a clockwise loop. As Enrique headed toward the Midway Island, increased wind shear weakened the system, causing another downgrade to depression status. As the storm approached the International Dateline, the system started to restrengthen. Shortly after crossing the dateline, Enrique became a tropical storm again on August 1. It lasted for less than 24 hours before it lost its convection and thus the cyclone began to dissipate. No damages or casualties were caused by Enrique.

=== Hurricane Fefa ===
- Category 3 hurricane (SSHWS)
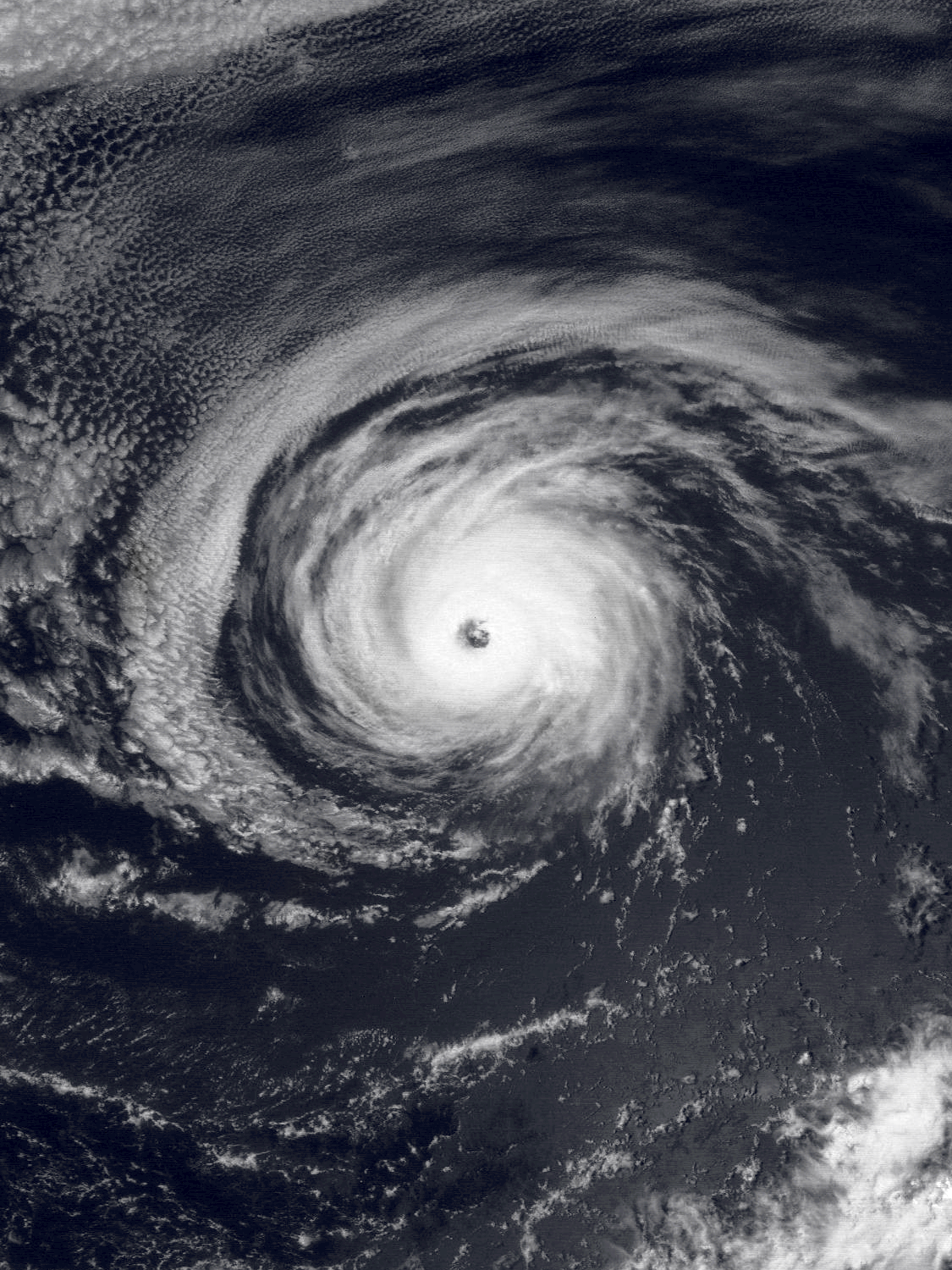
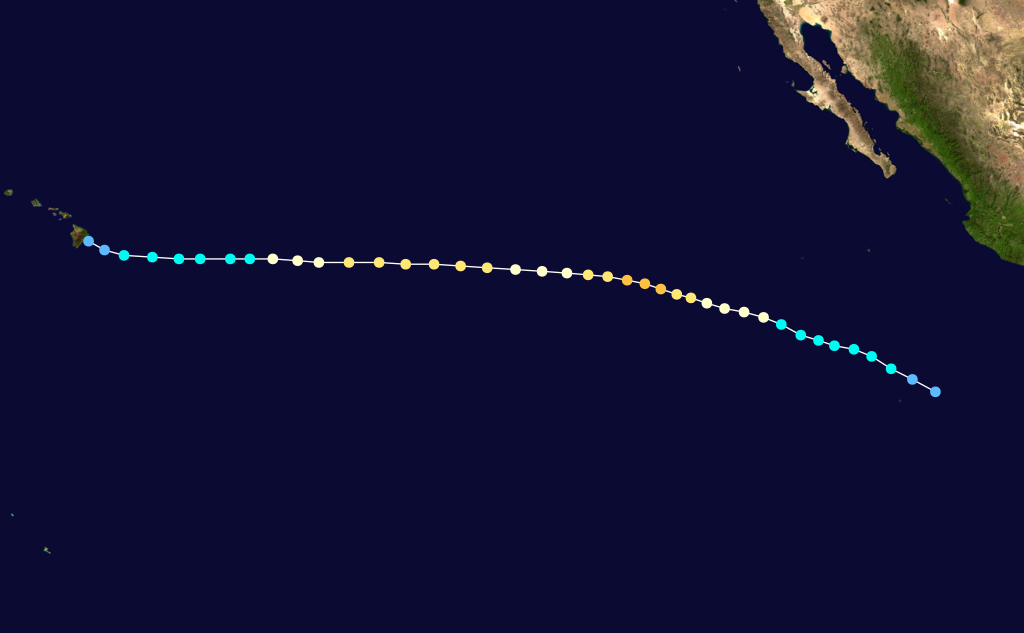
- Duration: July 29 – August 8
- Peak intensity: 120 mph (195 km/h) (1-min); 959 mbar (hPa)

A westward-moving tropical wave exited the coast of Africa on July 17. It tracked the Atlantic and Caribbean without development, and crossed Central America into the eastern Pacific on July 25. The cloud pattern and convection began to become better organized on July 28, and a day later it developed into Tropical Depression Seven-E while located about 975 miles (1,569 km) south-southeast of Cabo San Lucas. Located over warm waters with fair upper-level outflow, the depression intensified into Tropical Storm Fefa twelve hours after forming. Fefa developed a curved cloud band over the southern and eastern portion of the center. Steered by a ridge to its north, Fefa moved to the west-northwest and slowly strengthened, becoming a hurricane on July 31. A large, ragged eye developed the next day, and Fefa reached peak winds of 120 mph (190 km/h) on August 2. After peaking, Fefa encountered cooler waters and drier air, causing it to weaken as it turned more to the west. On August 4, Fefa restrengthened after crossing over warmer waters, reaching a secondary peak intensity of 105 mph (169 km/h). Increasing wind shear caused the hurricane to weaken again. Fefa crossed into the central Pacific on August 5, and weakened into a tropical storm the next day while moving toward Hawaii. Late on August 7, Fefa weakened to a tropical depression a short distance of the island of Hawaii. Early on August 8, the depression degenerated into a tropical wave after moving onshore. The remnants tracked west-northwestward and passed south of the Hawaiian Islands until dissipating on August 9 to the northwest of Kauai.

The prolonged westward track of Hurricane Fefa produced swells of up to 15 feet (4.6 m) in height. The swells hit eastward facing beaches along the island of Hawaii. The swells washed debris and sea water onto coastal roads near Punaluu Black Sand Beach, resulting in the roads being closed following the storm. Southwestern Maui experienced rough surf, as well. The remnants of Fefa produced locally strong wind gusts of up to 50 mph (80 km/h) in the islands of Hawaii and Maui. Strong thunderstorms developed over Mauna Kea and Kohala on the island of Hawaii. The thunderstorms produced flash flooding in Kohala and Hamakua. Lightning from the storm caused two injuries. A man in Hawaii Volcanoes National Park was hurt when lightning struck where he was walking. A man in Hilo was burnt when lightning moved through telephone wires.

=== Hurricane Guillermo ===
- Category 1 hurricane (SSHWS)
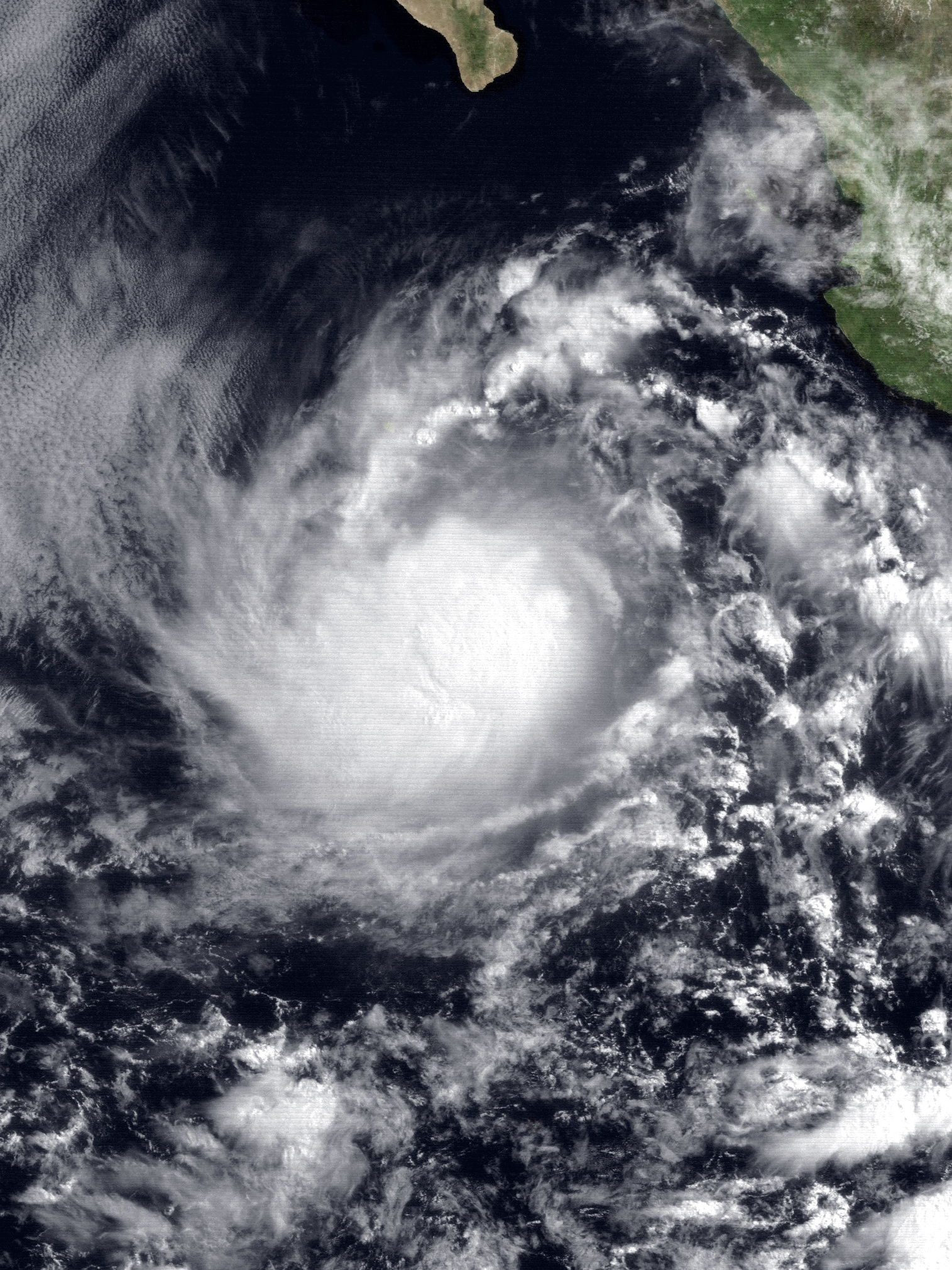
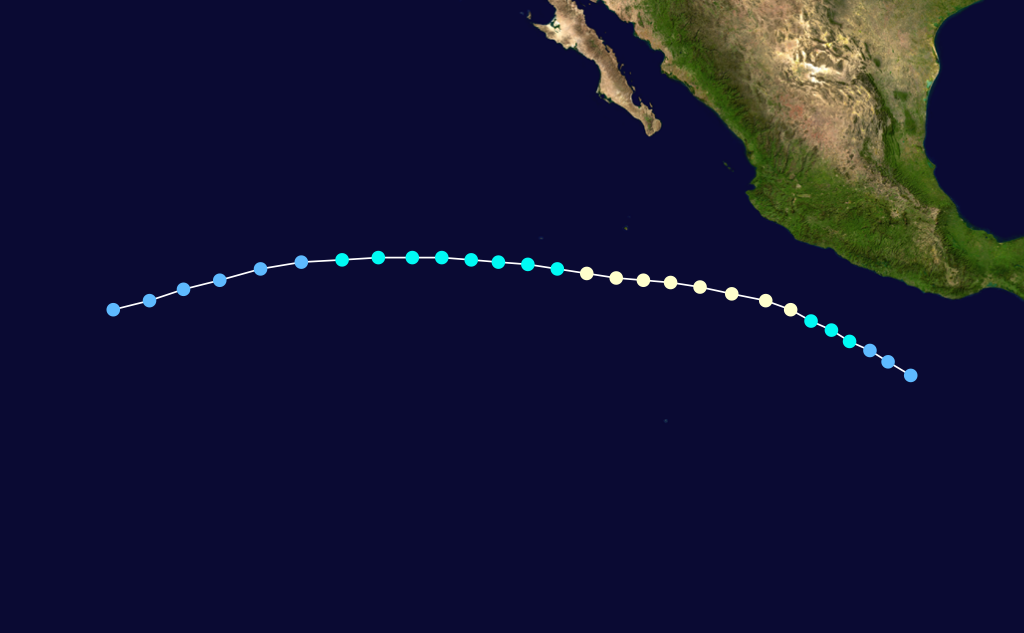
- Duration: August 4 – August 10
- Peak intensity: 80 mph (130 km/h) (1-min); 983 mbar (hPa)

A significant tropical wave with very little deep convection left Africa on July 22. It crossed the Atlantic, with convection associated with its southern part passing over the Windward Islands on July 28 and crossing Central America on July 31.

Signs of organization were evident late on August 2 when the wave was south of the Gulf of Tehuantepec. Then, on August 4, Tropical Depression Eight-E was formed while centered 350 mi (560 km) south-southeast of Acapulco. Despite the presence of easterly shear, the depression gradually intensified as the center moved toward the west-northwest, paralleling the coast of Mexico. Then, it reached tropical storm strength the same day. At that time, it was centered south-southwest of Acapulco. It peaked on August 5 with a central pressure of 993 mbar (29.3 inHg) and maximum sustained winds of 75 mph (121 km/h) while 255 mi (410 km) of Manzanillo, Colima. After its peak, Guillermo weakened to tropical storm status as it began losing convection. It subsequently weakened to a tropical depression and dissipated after that on August 10. There were no damages or casualties associated with this tropical cyclone.

=== Tropical Storm Hilda ===
- Tropical storm (SSHWS)
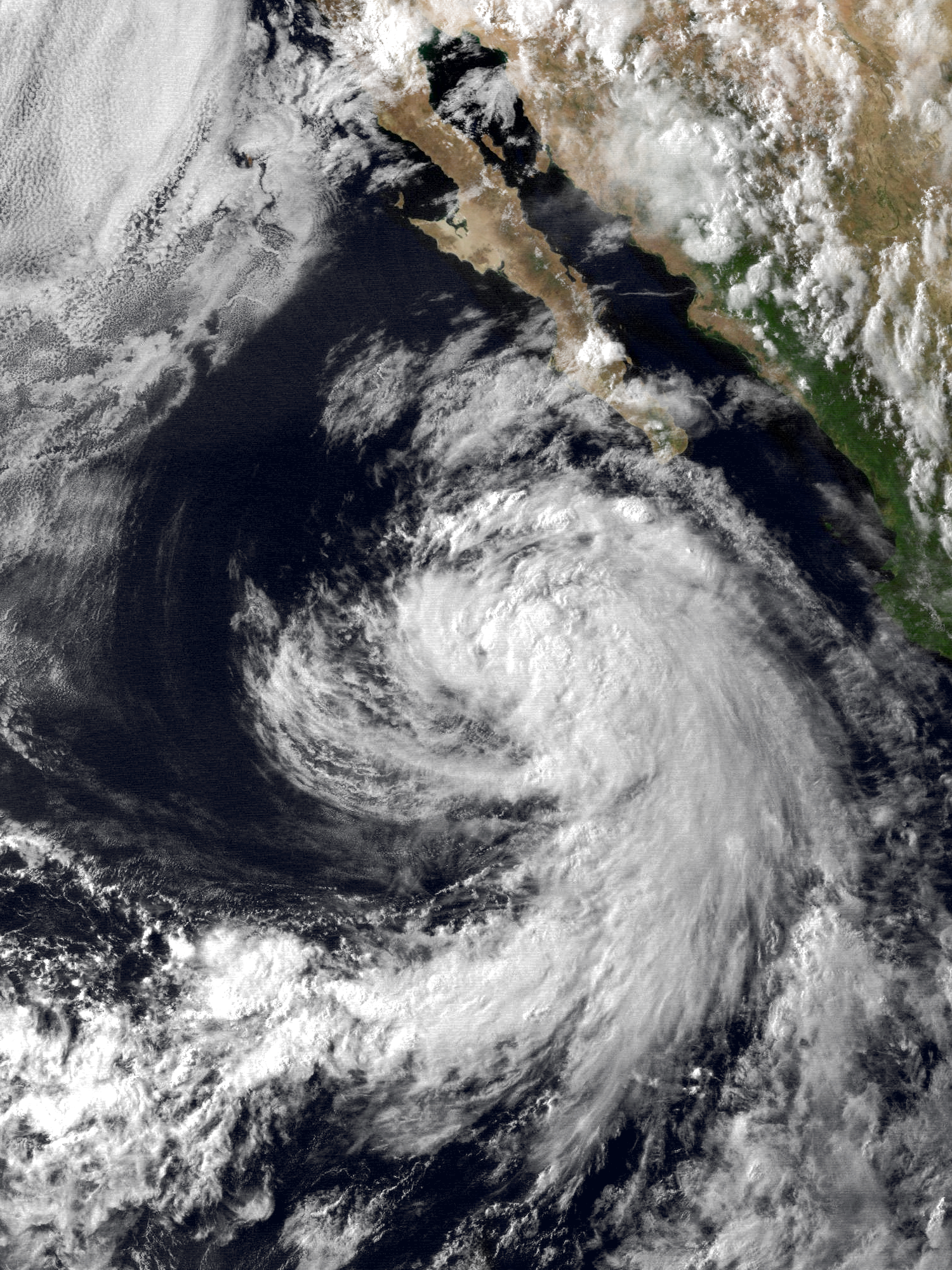
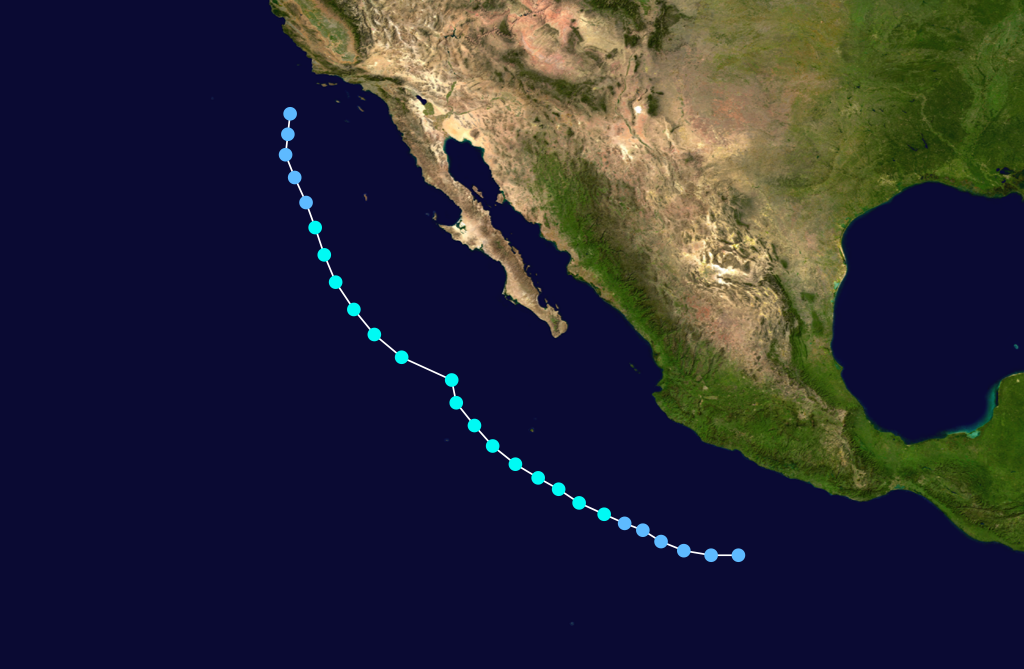
- Duration: August 8 – August 14
- Peak intensity: 65 mph (100 km/h) (1-min); 992 mbar (hPa)

Satellite imagery showed a convective area with some cyclonic turning in connection with a tropical wave over Africa on July 22. The convection gradually diminished as the system moved west-southwest into the Atlantic. On July 31, the wave passed south of Trinidad, where a low-level wind shift was detected. For the next couple of days, this system passed over Venezuela and Colombia. Then it crossed into the Pacific basin. It was not until August 6, while it was south of Guatemala, when the convection became organized. Then, the wave strengthened into a tropical depression about 230 mi (370 km/h) south-southwest of Acapulco, on August 8. The system intensified further and became Tropical Storm Hilda August 9. The storm reached its peak intensity on August 11 with estimated 100 km/h (65 mph) maximum winds and a pressure of 993 hPa (30 inHg). The tropical storm moved on a general west-northwest track for the next couple of days and then turned toward the north on August 13 as it was under the influence of an upper level trough. Later on that day, tropical storm force winds were reported on Guadalupe Island as the center of Hilda was located about 280 km (175 mi) from the island.

Hilda gradually weakened over cool waters but maintained a rather large level of circulation. This caused its dissipation to be slower than normal. Tropical Depression Hilda dissipated on August 14. It large remnant circulation continued northwards and eventually passed over California. There were no casualties or damages attributed to this tropical cyclone. Hilda's remnants caused rain as far north as San Francisco.

=== Tropical Depression Ten-E ===
- Tropical depression (SSHWS)
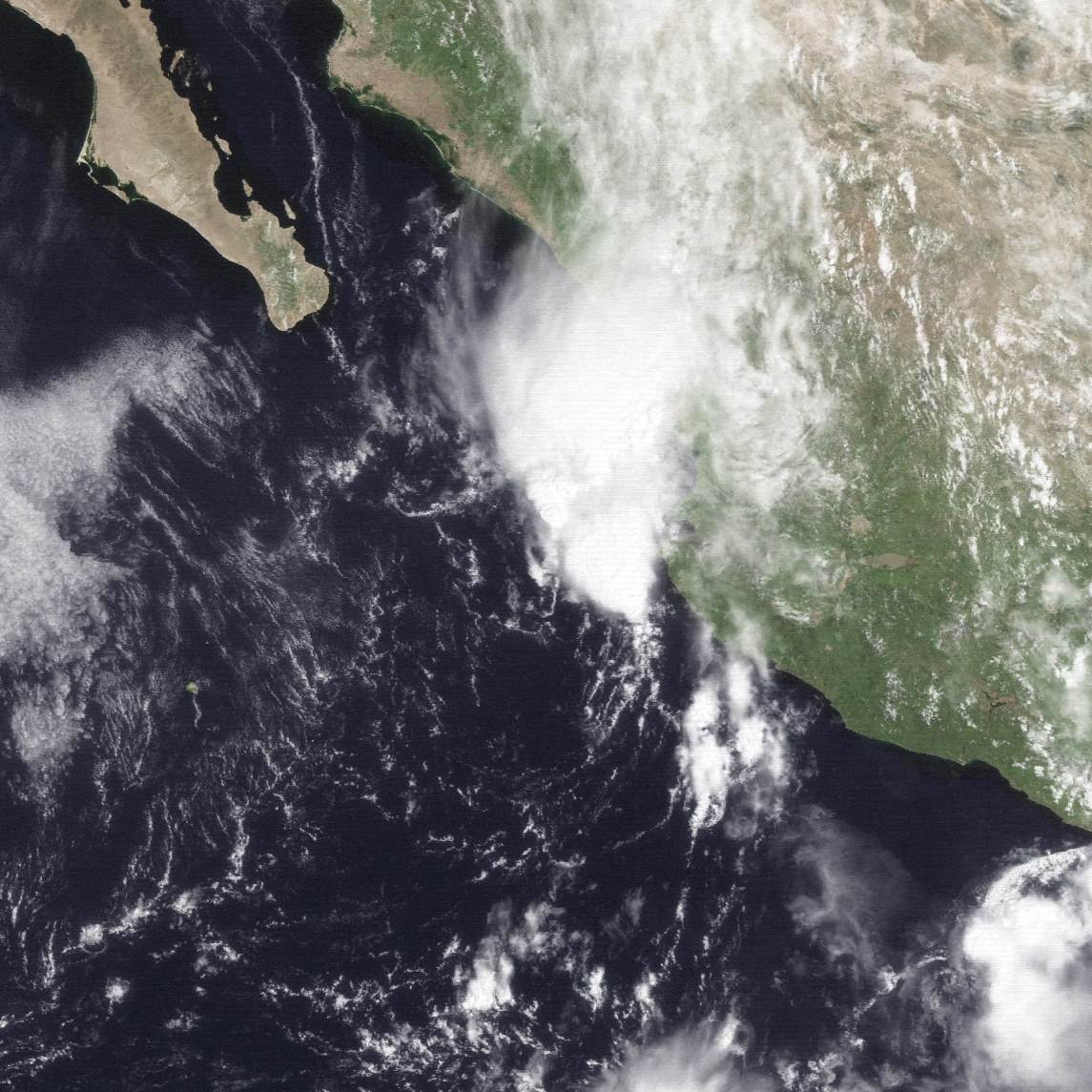
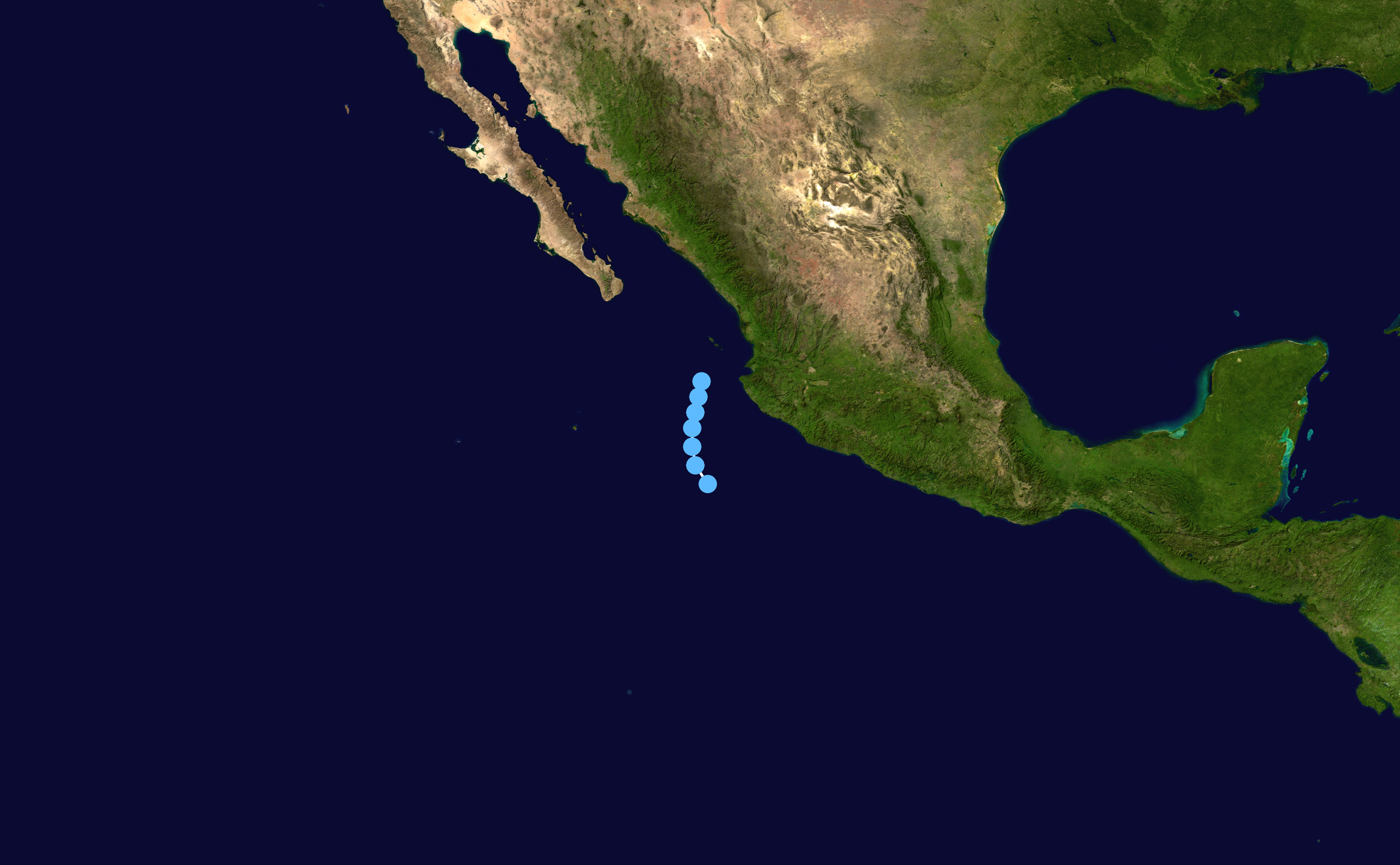
- Duration: September 12 – September 14
- Peak intensity: 35 mph (55 km/h) (1-min); 1005 mbar (hPa)

A tropical disturbance southwest of Manzanillo, Colima became a tropical depression on September 12 when its convection became persistent around a newly formed center of circulation. Conditions were not favorable for development because of strong wind shear environment caused by a trough. The depression took a northward track and dissipated on September 13 as it was being sheared just south of the Gulf of California.

Tropical Depression Ten-E brought heavy showers to parts of Mexico. There were no reported deaths or damages.

=== Tropical Storm Ignacio ===
- Tropical storm (SSHWS)
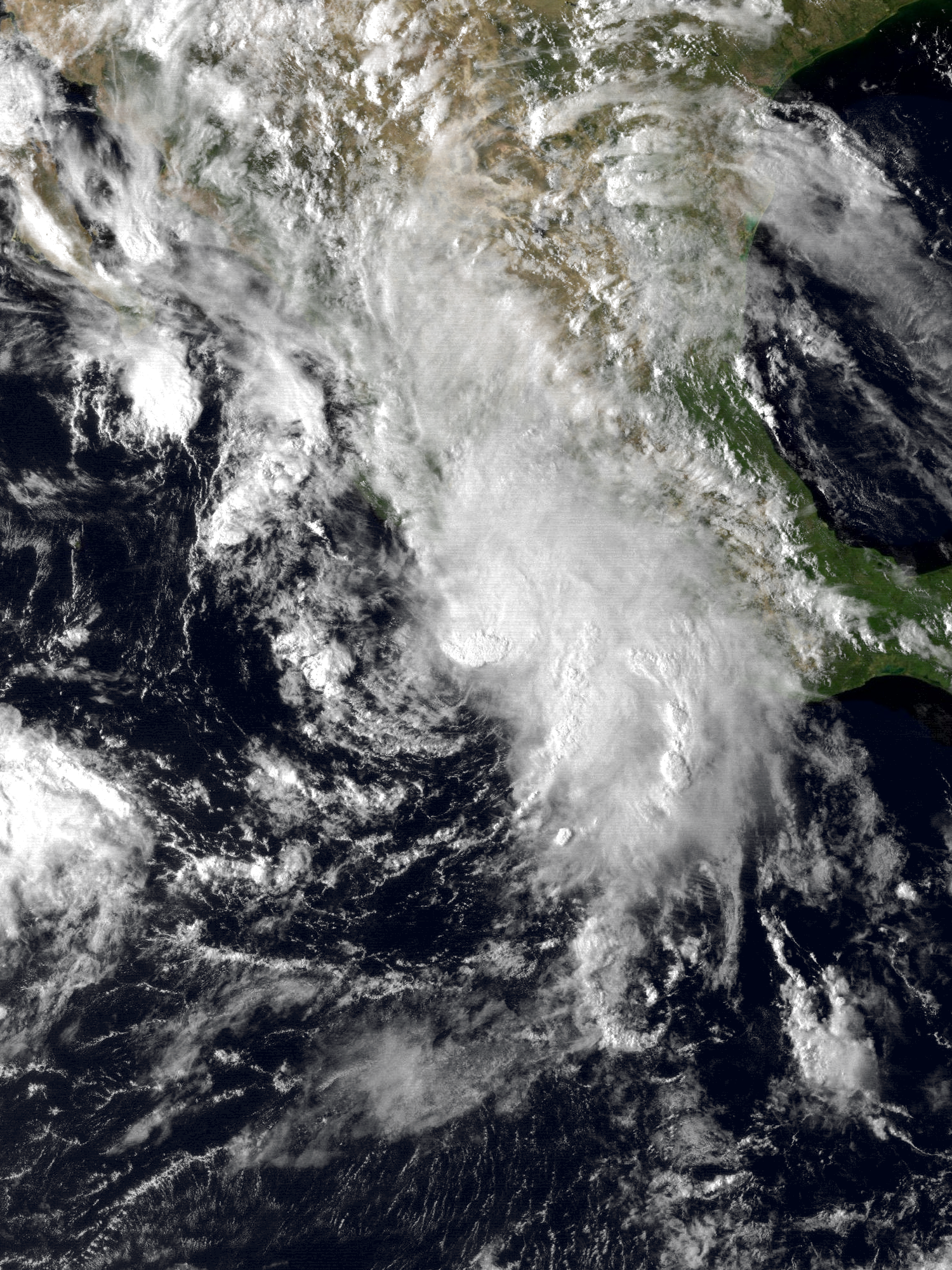
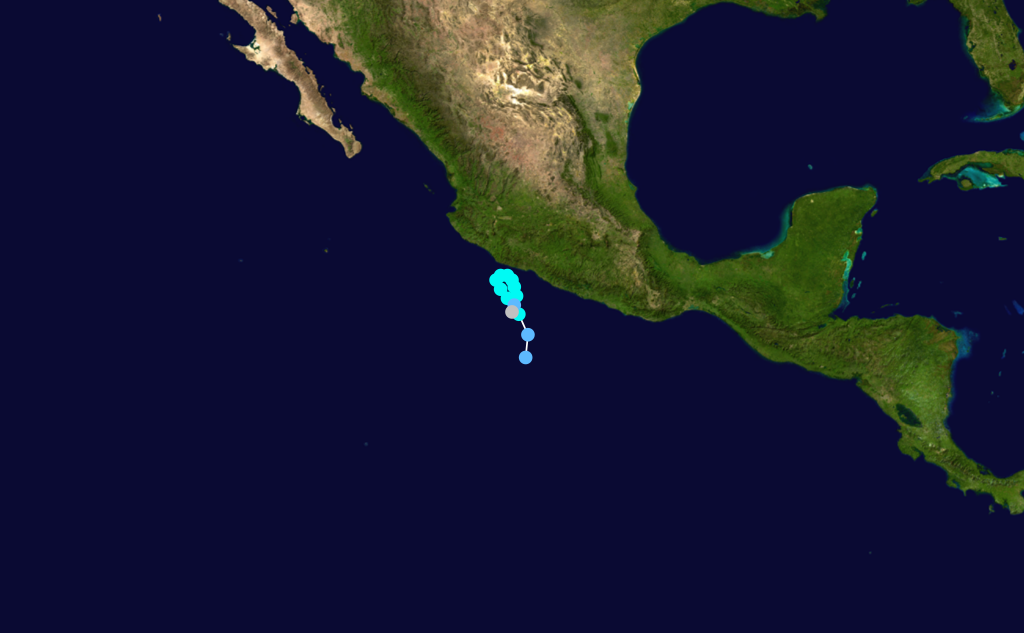
- Duration: September 16 – September 19
- Peak intensity: 65 mph (100 km/h) (1-min); 994 mbar (hPa)

The origins of Ignacio formed from two tropical waves. The pair moved across the Atlantic during the first ten days of September. The second of the two spawned Tropical Storm Erika in the eastern Atlantic. It emerged into the eastern Pacific between the September 10 and September 12. An area of thunderstorms developed southeast of an upper level cyclone off the southern tip of Baja California Sur due to the interaction of the upper cyclone with the pair of tropical waves. It had become a broad area of convection located to the east of a quasi-stationary mid-level trough axis along 115°W. The area of disturbance became a tropical depression on September 16, located about 375 km (233 mi) southwest of Acapulco. It quickly strengthened into Tropical Storm Ignacio. The storm executed a small clockwise loop just 45 km (28 mi) offshore, while reaching peak winds of 65 mph (100 km/h). It also attained a minimum central pressure of 994 mbar (29.4 inHg) on the evening of September 17. Ignacio was downgraded to a tropical depression on September 19 and became a remnant low later that day. The remnants of Ignacio, identified on satellite imagery as occasional flare-ups of convection, moved west-southwestwards over the next two days.

The storm led to tropical storm warnings across portions of southwestern Mexico. Tropical Storm Ignacio dropped heavy rains over a large area of Mexico. The highest amount recorded was 15.43 in (392 mm) at Pasa de San Antonio. Ten people died in Guerrero due to flash flooding. The storm also caused street flooding in Acapulco. The remnants of the storm caused several dams to burst in the state of Chihuahua, leaving 10,000 people homeless and killing another 13. Overall, 40 people were injured.

=== Hurricane Jimena ===
- Category 4 hurricane (SSHWS)
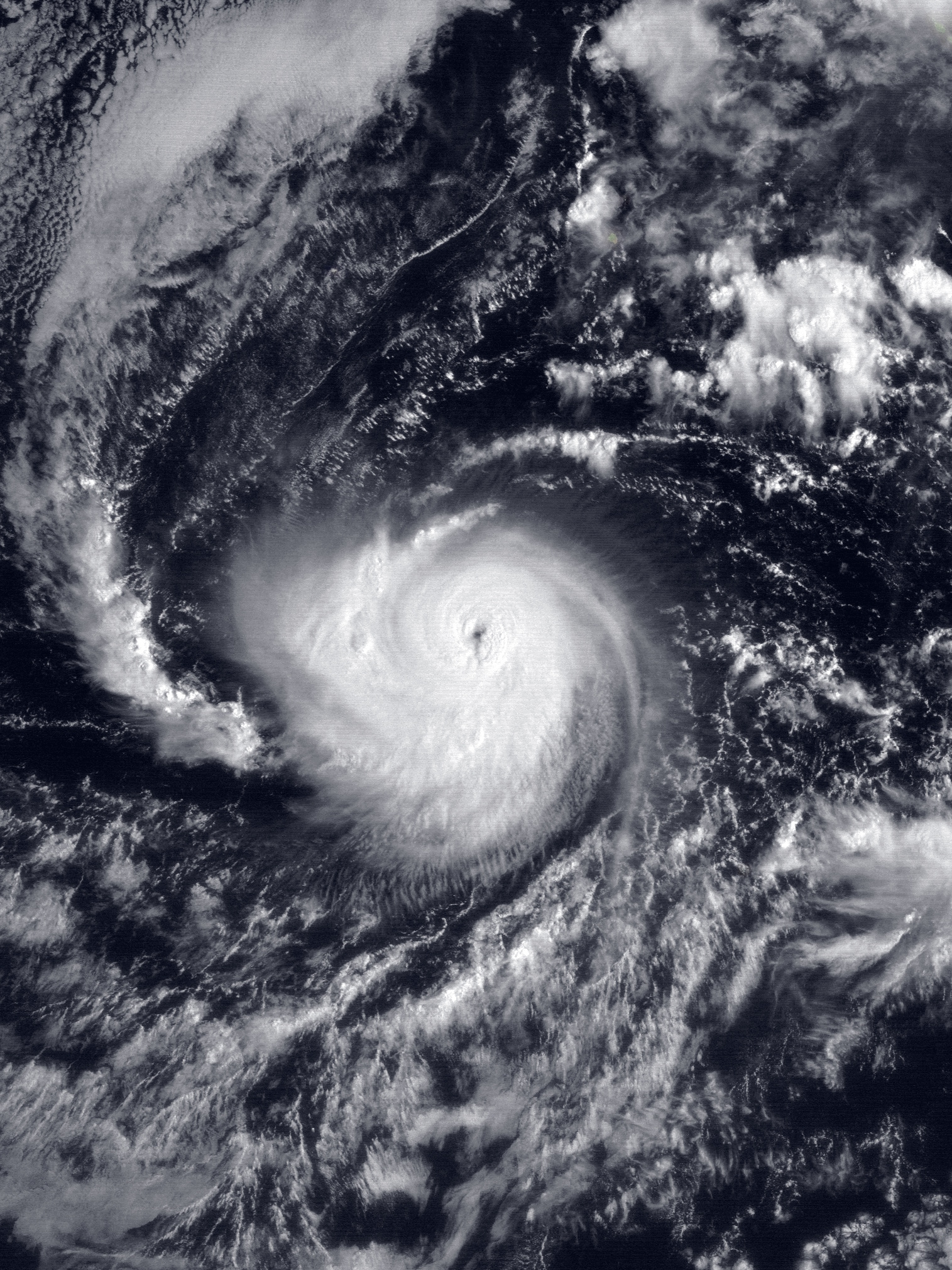
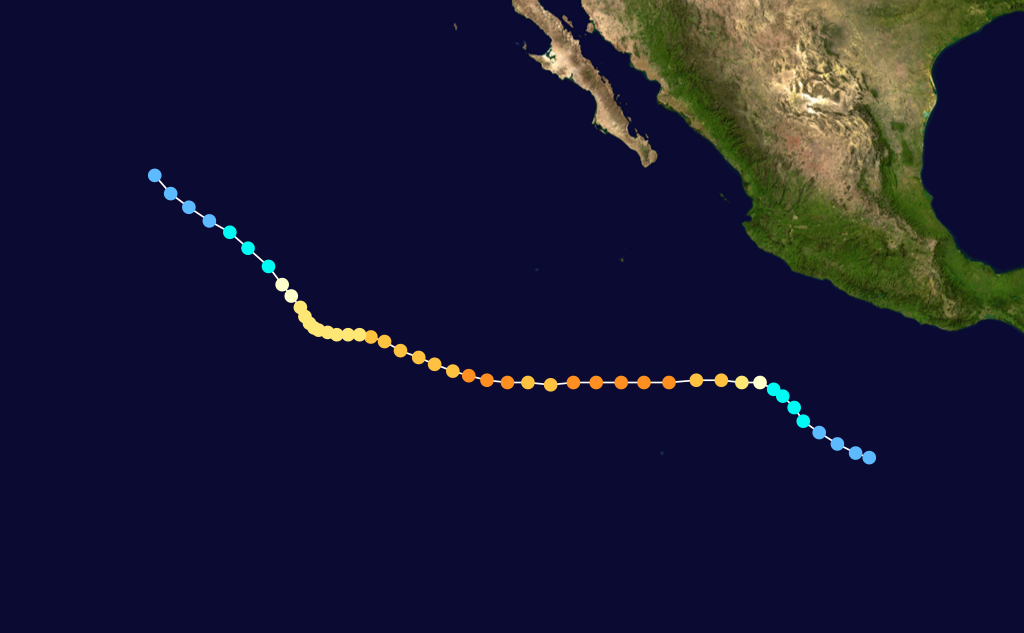
- Duration: September 20 – October 2
- Peak intensity: 130 mph (215 km/h) (1-min); 945 mbar (hPa)

Part of the same tropical wave that formed Tropical Storm Danny in the Atlantic crossed over the Isthmus of Panama and became a disturbance in the Intertropical Convergence Zone during mid to late September. On September 20 the cloud pattern had increased in organization and the system was designated a tropical depression. Continuing to strengthen, the depression became a tropical storm on September 21. The tropical storm then headed towards the northwest. Development was rapid, especially after September 22 as a banding type eye was forming. Further rapid development took place by the following day and the maximum sustained winds increased to its peak of 130 mph (215 km/h) by the afternoon of September 23. Jimena maintained itself as a powerful hurricane for three days, moving west until September 26, when it turned toward the west-northwest. Jimena began to weaken on September 27. A northwestward movement commenced on September 29 in response to a large upper-level trough which developed in its northwest. It continued to weaken and on September 30 it regained tropical storm intensity before becoming downgraded to a depression. On October 2, Jimena dissipated as a tropical cyclone. Hurricane Jimena caused no reported damage or casualties.

=== Hurricane Kevin ===
- Category 4 hurricane (SSHWS)
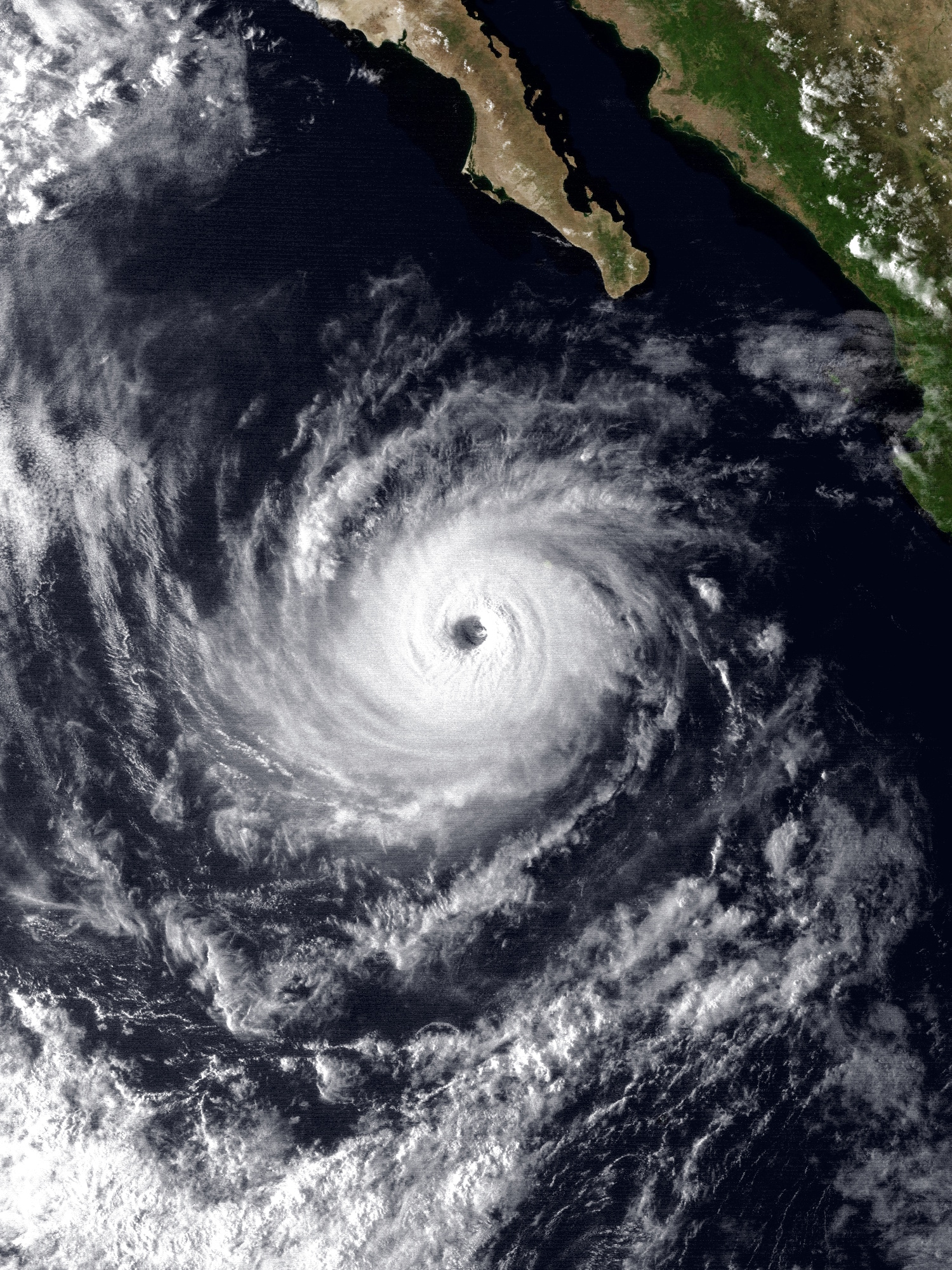
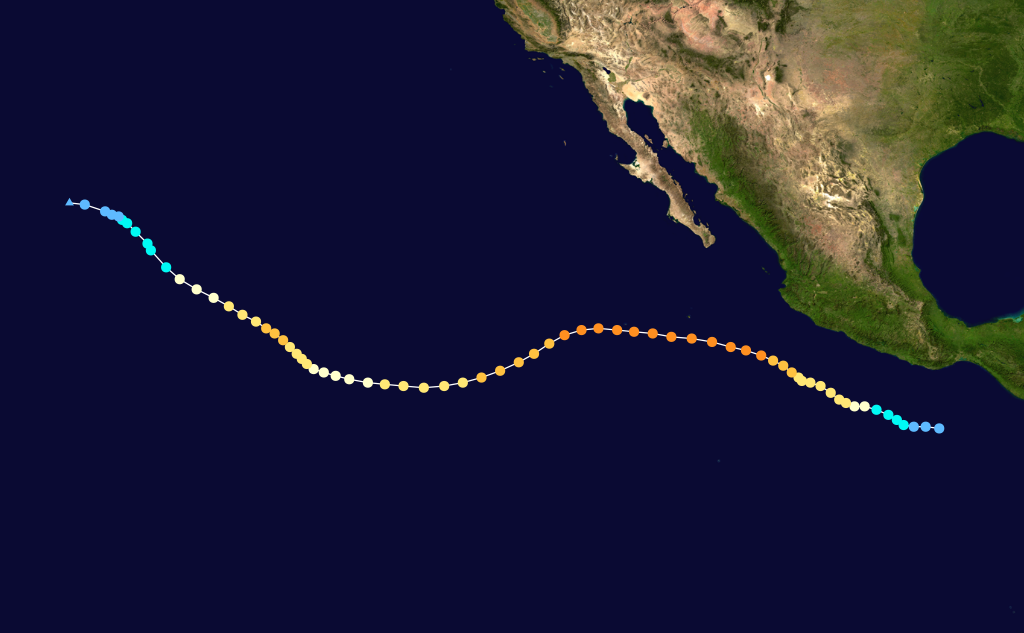
- Duration: September 25 – October 12
- Peak intensity: 145 mph (230 km/h) (1-min); 935 mbar (hPa)

Kevin formed from a westward-moving tropical wave which emerged from the northwest coast of Africa on September 11. The wave crossed into the Pacific basin on September 21 with no signs of development. Cloudiness and convection became better organized on the first hours of September 24, becoming Tropical Depression Thirteen-E the next day as it was located about 405 mi (650 km) southeast of Acapulco. Then the depression moved toward the west. The banding pattern became more pronounced and the depression was upgraded to Tropical Storm Kevin later that day, being centered about 316 mi (509 km) south-southeast of Acapulco. The convective banding increased for the next 24 hours and Kevin strengthened to hurricane status on September 26, while 230 mi (370 km) south-southwest of Acapulco. Kevin continued to strengthen and an eye intermittently appeared on September 27 and 28.

By September 29, Kevin had a well-defined eye and this feature persisted for several days. The hurricane continued to strengthen and on October 1 reached its peak intensity while centered roughly 400 mi (645 km) south-southwest of the southern tip of Baja California Sur, with estimated 145 mph (230 km/h) maximum winds and a minimum pressure of 935 mbar (27.6 inHg). Kevin was moving toward the west at this time. It turned toward the west-southwest due to a strong high pressure system located northwest of the hurricane. Then, Kevin began to weaken gradually and its eye became poorly defined on October 4. It weakened on October 6 as the hurricane began turning toward the northwest and continued this general motion for the next few days.

However, a well-defined eye reappeared on satellite imagery in the system and Kevin re-intensified to a low-end Category 3 hurricane with maximum winds of 115 mph (185 km/h) and a minimum pressure of 960 mbar (28 inHg) on October 7. But this was short-lived and on October 8 the hurricane began to weaken again and on October 9 it had entered into the Central Pacific basin as a waning Category 1 hurricane. After this crossing, it was subsequently downgraded to storm strength the same day and on October 11, to a depression. It dissipated as a tropical cyclone that same day. The remnant circulation did persist a while longer as it slowly drifted north to finally lose its identity late on October 14. Despite its long life, Hurricane Kevin caused no damage or casualties. Because Kevin passed north of Hawaii, its only effect on land was increased trade winds.

=== Hurricane Linda ===
- Category 3 hurricane (SSHWS)
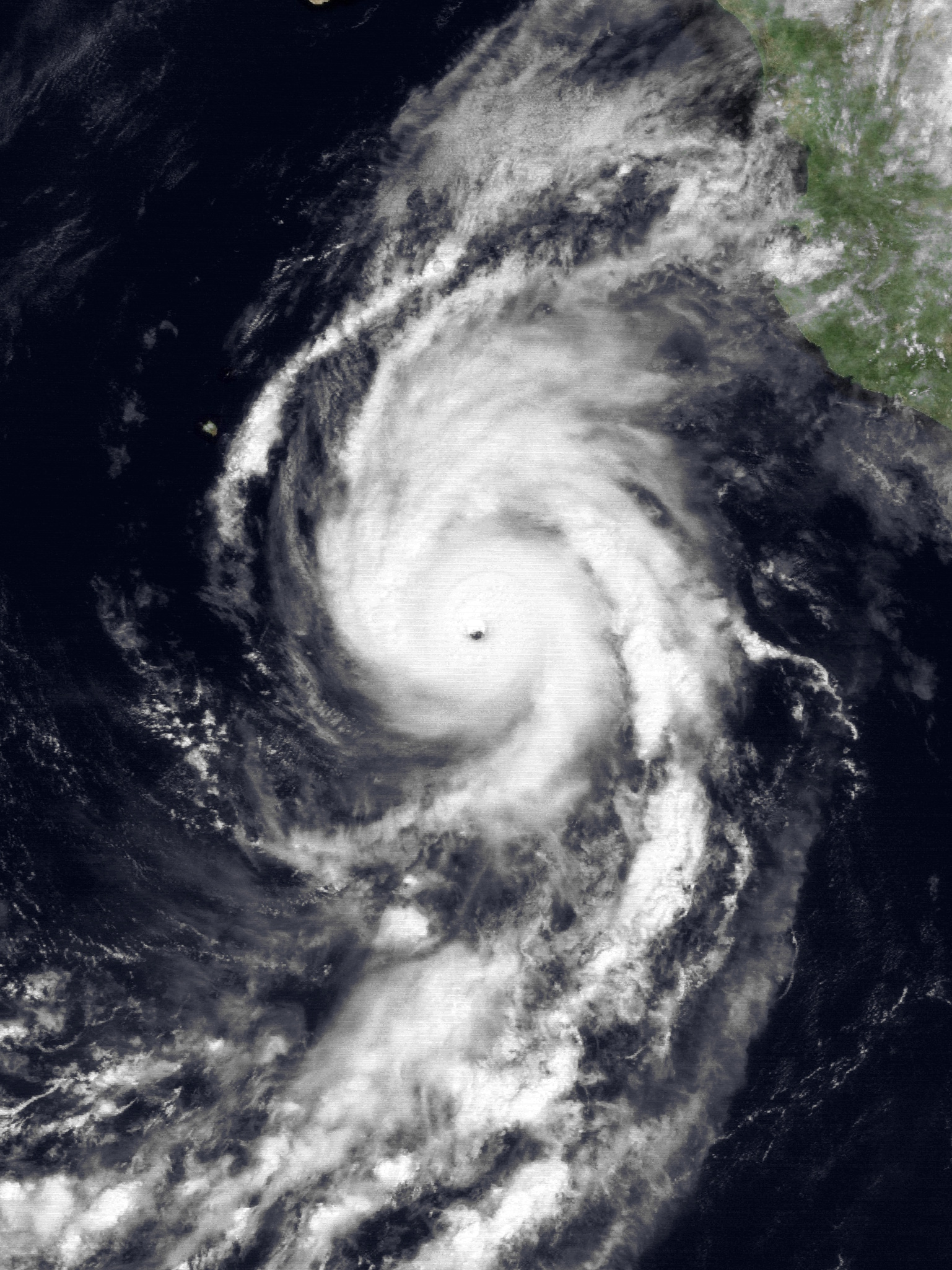
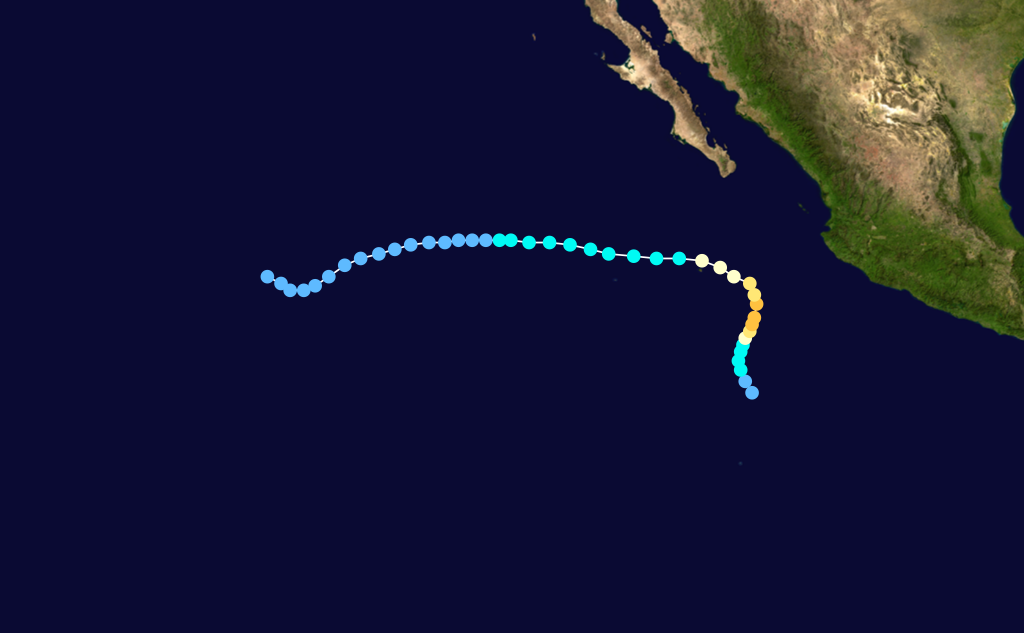
- Duration: October 2 – October 13
- Peak intensity: 120 mph (195 km/h) (1-min); 957 mbar (hPa)

The tropical wave that ultimately produced Hurricane Linda emerged from the northwest coast of Africa on September 16 and tracked westward across the tropical Atlantic. The convection increased markedly upon approaching the Lesser Antilles on September 21. The tropical wave's northern portion split off to the north and caused showers in Jamaica, the Bahamas and Cuba while the southern part continued and crossed Panama into the Pacific basin on September 25 as a group of disorganized cloud clusters. It took many days to organize and it was not until October 3 when organization improved and the wave became Tropical Depression Fourteen-E.

The tropical depression moved toward the northwest while strengthening and became Tropical Storm Linda within 12 hours. As Linda then drifted to the north it was upgraded to a hurricane on October 5. Then, the hurricane reached its estimated peak intensity of 120 mph (195 km/h) and a minimum central pressure of 957 mbar (28.3 inHg) that same day. Linda began to weaken as it was following Kevin's track and entered to colder waters. Linda turned the west-northwest and passed 60 miles (95 km) from Socorro Island, where it caused 80 mph (130 km/h) sustained winds on October 7. Later that day, Linda weakened to a tropical storm. On October 9, as Linda was following Kevin's track, the cyclone continued to weaken and was downgraded to a depression, although deep convection continued to intermittently appear. Finally, on early October 14, Linda dissipated. There were no reported casualties or damages from Linda.

=== Hurricane Marty ===
- Category 1 hurricane (SSHWS)
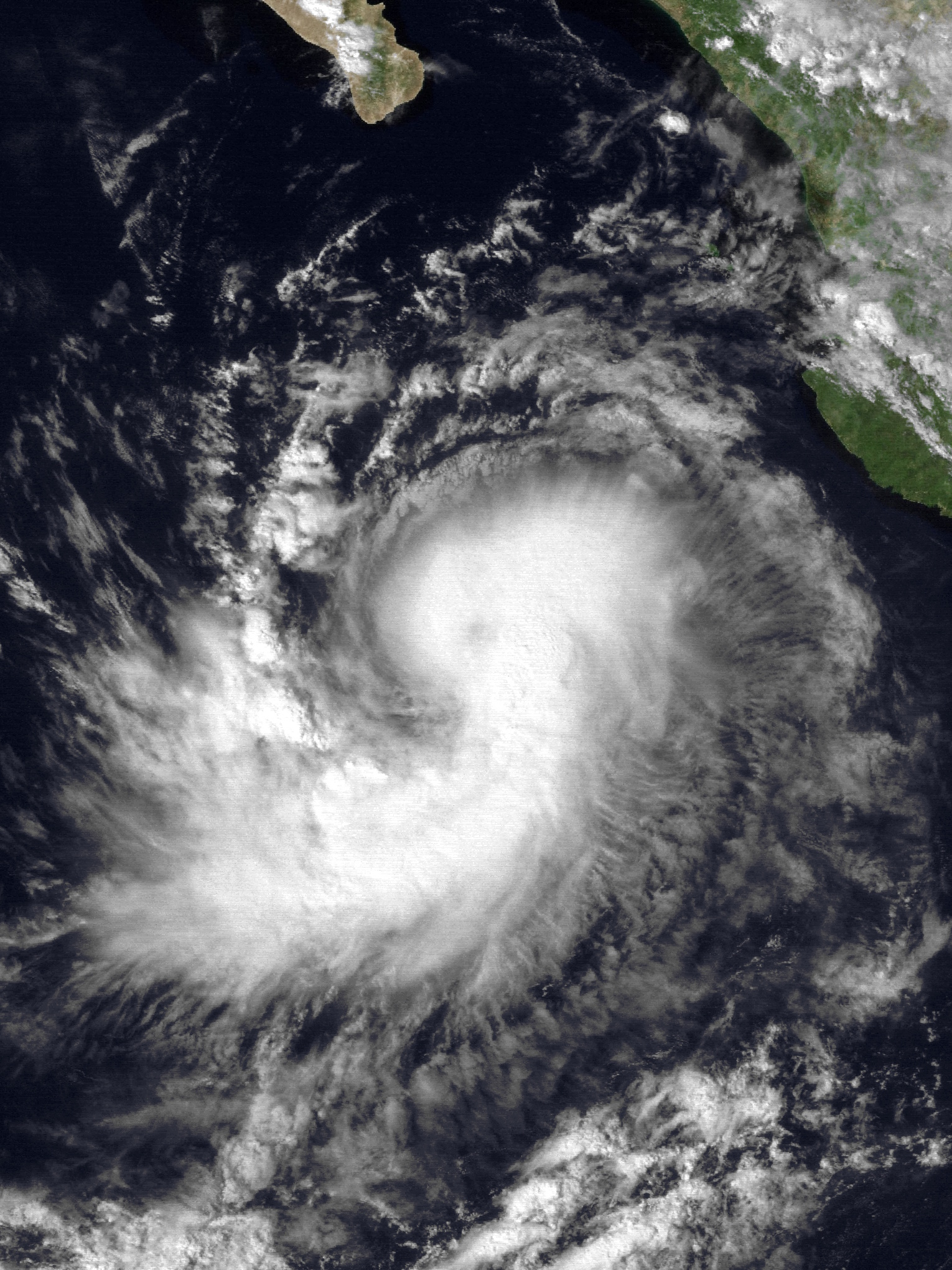
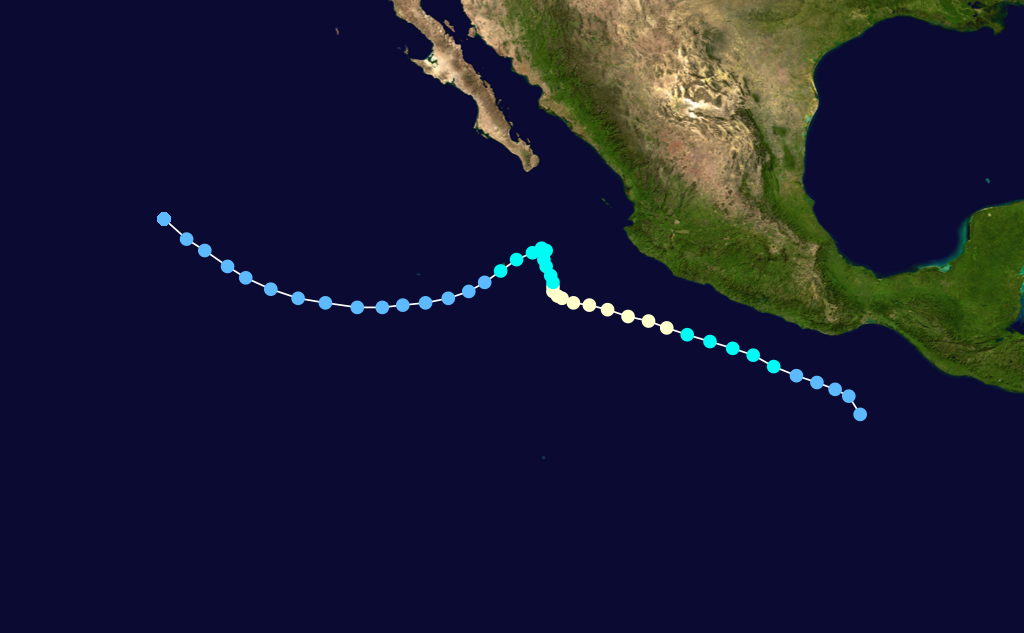
- Duration: October 7 – October 18
- Peak intensity: 80 mph (130 km/h) (1-min); 979 mbar (hPa)

On October 5, a tropical wave crossed Central America and it began to organize the next day. Based on satellite classifications, the weather system was upgraded to tropical depression status about 275 mi (445 km) south of the Gulf of Tehuantepec on October 7. It became a tropical storm on October 8 and was named Marty. It reached hurricane status early on October 10 while moving parallel to the coast of Mexico. There were several occasions when an eye was becoming apparent in satellite imagery but it never fully developed. An upper trough over the Western United States forced Marty to moved toward the northwest and north for a while, bringing the hurricane to waters previously cooled by hurricanes Kevin and Linda. Then, Marty disorganized and weakened into a tropical storm. Also, the trough which forced Marty northward moved out of the area, which made that Marty turned sharply to the west, then west-southwest around a high pressure system. Marty weakened further and remained as a tropical depression. It finally dissipated on October 18.

On October 8, Marty was threatening enough to prompt the Mexican government to issue a tropical storm watch from Manzanillo to Acapulco. The warning was dropped on October 9 when Marty moved away. There were no associated casualties or damages with this tropical cyclone.

=== Hurricane Nora ===
- Category 2 hurricane (SSHWS)
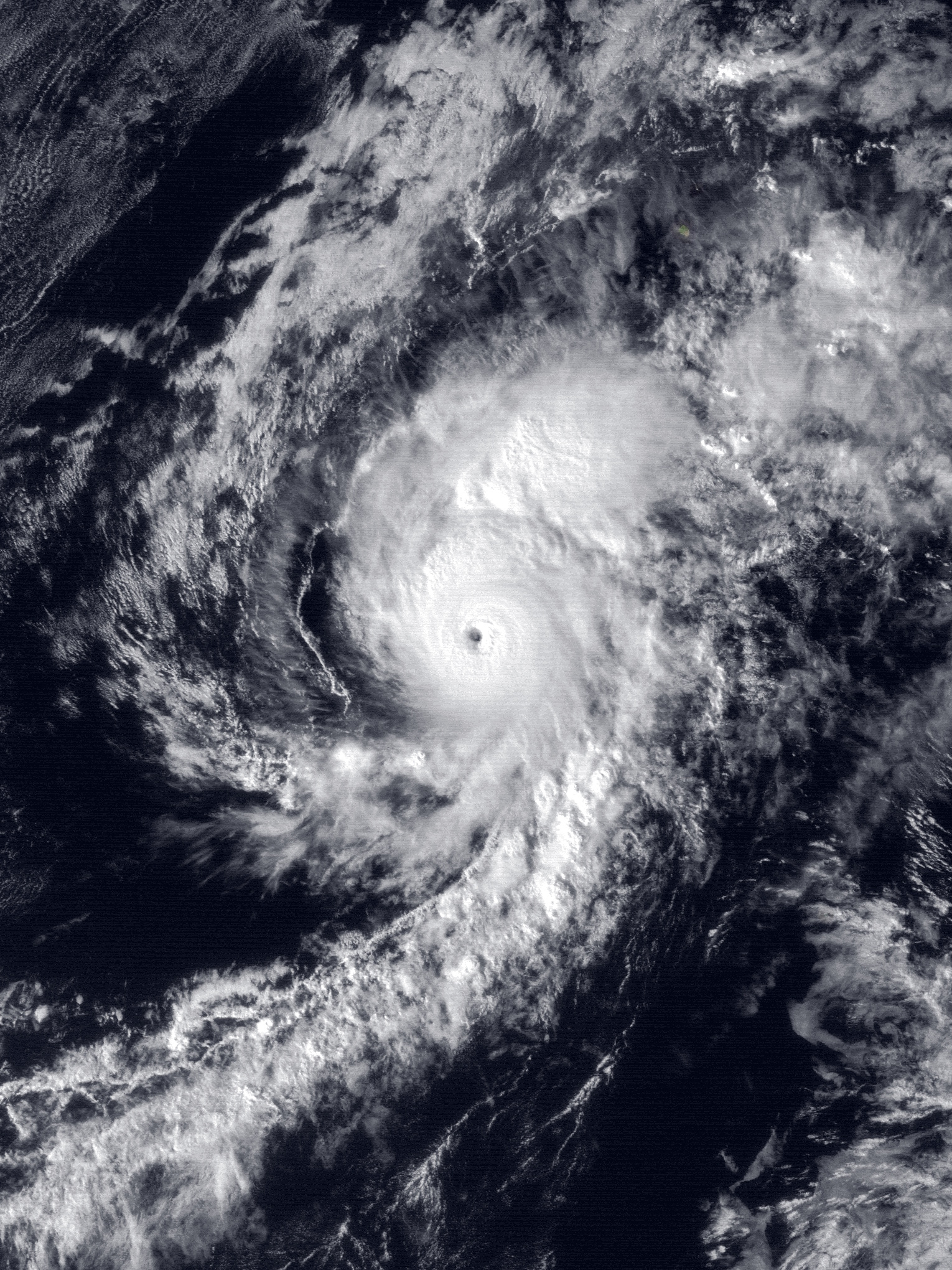
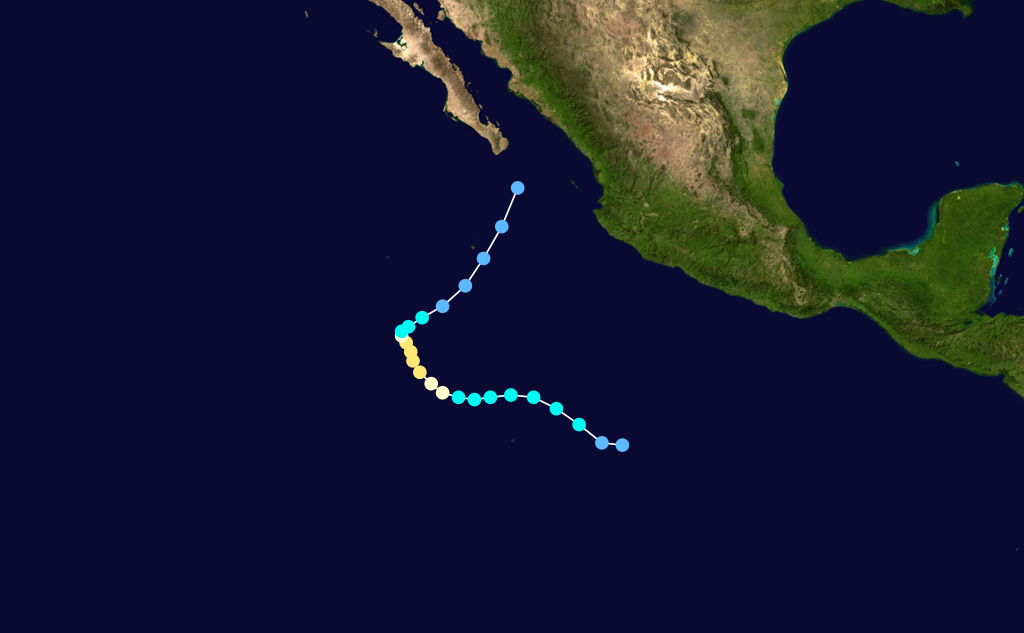
- Duration: November 7 – November 12
- Peak intensity: 105 mph (165 km/h) (1-min); 970 mbar (hPa)

On November 7, an area of convection associated with a tropical wave developed into a tropical depression, while located about 560 mi (900 km) to the southeast of Acapulco, Mexico. During that day the depression moved towards the northwest, intensified into a tropical storm and was named Nora later that day. On the next day, the storm gradually intensified further while temporarily moving towards the west, due to the flow field around a strengthening high pressure system located to the north of Nora. After developing an eye, Nora intensified into a hurricane.

On November 9, Nora. It peaked as a Category 2 hurricane on November 10. A large trough moved in from the west and formed a low. Shear increased and disrupted Nora's convection. The low also caused an abrupt change of course to the northeast. Nora weakened to a depression on November 11 and dissipated the next day. Nora's remnants continued to the northeast, showing brief flare-ups of convection. No deaths or damage were reported to have occurred in association with Nora, despite probable rainfall totals of around 3 in (76 mm) within the Mexican states of Sinaloa and Nayarit.

== Storm names ==
The following list of names was used for named storms that formed in the North Pacific Ocean east of 140°W in 1991. This is essentially the same list used for the 1985 season, though the rotating lists went only to the "W" name at the time. Another difference was that the 1985 "D" name had been "Dolores", whereas "Delores" was used in 1991.

- Andres
- Blanca
- Carlos
- Delores
- Enrique *
- Fefa *
- Guillermo
- Hilda
- Ignacio
- Jimena
- Kevin *
- Linda
- Marty
- Nora
- Olaf (unused)
- Pauline (unused)
- Rick (unused)
- Sandra (unused)
- Terry (unused)
- Vivian (unused)
- Waldo (unused)
- Xina (unused)
- York (unused)
- Zelda (unused)

For storms that form in the North Pacific from 140°W to the International Date Line, the names come from a series of four rotating lists. Names are used one after the other without regard to year, and when the bottom of one list is reached, the next named storm receives the name at the top of the next list. No named storms formed in the central North Pacific in 1991. Named storms in the table above that crossed into the area during the year are noted (*).

=== Retirement ===
Following the 1991 season, the World Meteorological Organization retired the name Fefa from future use in the Eastern Pacific. It was replaced with Felicia for the 1997 season.

== Seasonal effects ==
This is a table of all of the tropical cyclones that formed in the 1991 Pacific hurricane season. It includes their name, duration, peak classification and intensities, areas affected, damage, and death totals. Deaths in parentheses are additional and indirect (an example of an indirect death would be a traffic accident), but were still related to that storm. Damage and deaths include totals while the storm was extratropical, a wave, or a low, and all of the damage figures are in 1991 USD.

Saffir–Simpson scale
TD	TS	C1	C2	C3	C4	C5

1991 Pacific tropical cyclone season statistics
Storm name	Dates active	Storm category at peak intensity	Max 1-min wind mph (km/h)	Min. press. (mbar)	Areas affected	Damage (US$)	Deaths	Ref(s).
Andres	May 16–20	Tropical storm	65 (100)	994	None	None	None	
Blanca	June 14–22	Tropical storm	65 (100)	994	None	None	None	
Carlos	June 16–27	Category 3 hurricane	120 (195)	955	None	None	None	
Delores	June 22–28	Category 1 hurricane	85 (140)	979	Southwestern Mexico, Revillagigedo Islands	Minimal	None	
Five-E	June 28–30	Tropical depression	35 (55)	1006	Southwestern Mexico, Central America	Minimal	1	
Enrique	July 15–31	Category 1 hurricane	75 (120)	987	Hawaiian Islands, Aleutian Islands (before crossover)	Minimal	None	
Fefa	July 29 – August 8	Category 3 hurricane	120 (195)	959	Big Island of Hawaii, Hawaiian Islands	None	None	
Guillermo	August 4–10	Category 1 hurricane	80 (130)	983	None	None	None	
Hilda	August 8–14	Tropical storm	65 (100)	992	Southwestern United States, California	Moderate	None	
Ten-E	September 12–14	Tropical depression	35 (55)	1005	Southwestern Mexico	None	None	
Ignacio	September 16–19	Tropical storm	65 (100)	994	Southwestern Mexico, Northwestern Mexico	Minimal	23	
Jimena	September 20 – October 2	Category 4 hurricane	130 (215)	945	None	None	None	
Kevin	September 25 – October 12	Category 4 hurricane	145 (230)	935	Revillagigedo Islands	None	None	
Linda	October 2–13	Category 3 hurricane	120 (195)	957	None	None	None	
Marty	October 7–18	Category 1 hurricane	80 (130)	979	Southwestern Mexico, Revillagigedo Islands, Baja California Peninsula	None	None	
Nora	November 7–12	Category 2 hurricane	105 (165)	970	Southwestern Mexico, Revillagigedo Islands, Baja California Peninsula, Northwestern Mexico, Texas	None	None	
Season aggregates
16 systems	May 16 – November 12		145 (230)	935			24	

== See also ==
- List of Pacific hurricanes
- Tropical cyclones in 1991
- Pacific hurricane season
- 1991 Atlantic hurricane season
- 1991 Pacific typhoon season
- 1991 North Indian Ocean cyclone season
- South-West Indian Ocean cyclone season: 1990–91, 1991–92
- Australian region cyclone season: 1990–91, 1991–92
- South Pacific cyclone season: 1990–91, 1991–92
