= Salina Cruz =

City in Oaxaca, Mexico

- Municipality and town
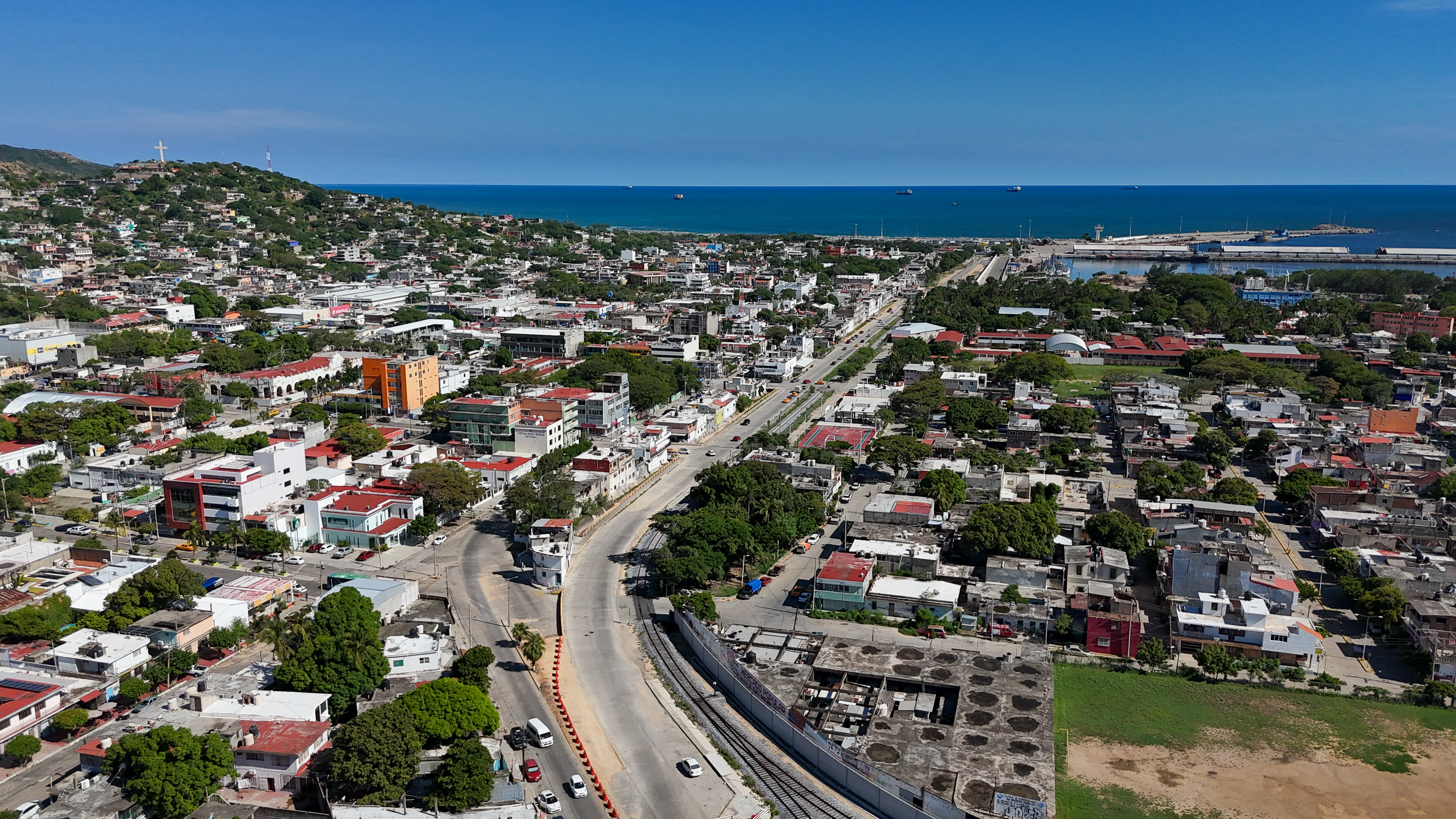
- Aerial view of Salina Cruz, Oaxaca, Mexico.

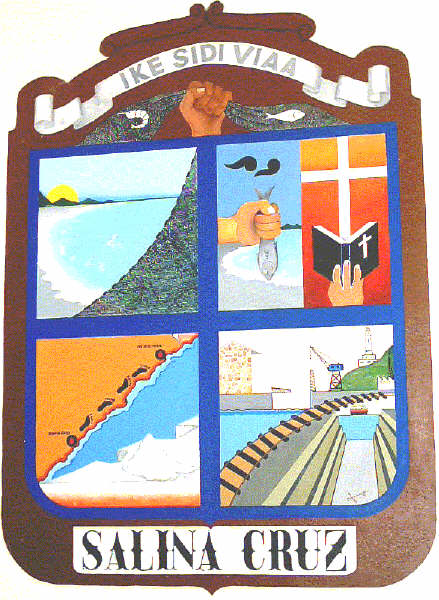
- Coat of arms

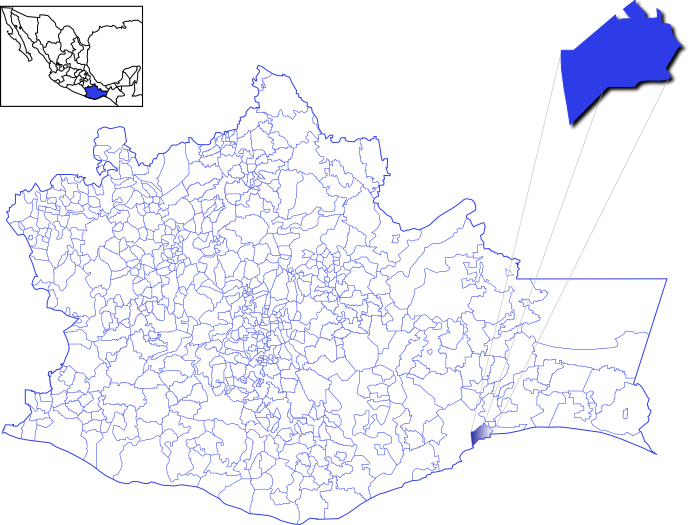
- Location of the municipality in Oaxaca

- Location in Mexico
- Coordinates: 16°10′N 95°12′W
- Country: Mexico
- State: Oaxaca

Area
  - Total: 131.9 km^{2} (50.9 sq mi)
  - Town: 31.7 km^{2} (12.2 sq mi)

Population (2020 census)
  - Total: 84,438
  - Density: 640.2/km^{2} (1,658/sq mi)
  - Town: 76,660
  - Town density: 2,420/km^{2} (6,260/sq mi)
- Time zone: UTC-6 (Zona Centro)

Salina Cruz is a major seaport on the Pacific coast of the Mexican state of Oaxaca. It is the state's fourth-largest city and is the municipal seat of the municipality of the same name. It is part of the Tehuantepec District in the west of the Istmo Region. The city had a 2020 census population of 76,660, while its municipality, with an area of 131.9 km^{2} (50.9 sq mi) had a population of 84,438, the state's fifth-largest municipality in population.

The port was developed in the late 19th century due to its location at the southern terminus of the Tren Interoceánico, which carried freight across the Isthmus of Tehuantepec.

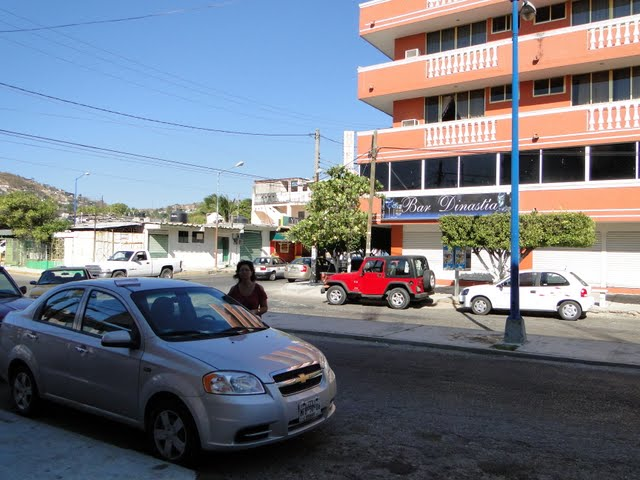
Salina Cruz in 2010

== History ==
Salina Cruz was founded in 1522 by the Spanish, under whose command Pedro de Alvarado came. It was given the name "Salina de la Santa Cruz" as its official foundation day was the Catholic day of the holy cross.

Salina Cruz is situated near the mouth of the Río Tehuantepec, on the open coast of the Isthmus of Tehuantepec on the Gulf of Tehuantepec, and has no natural harbour. There was only a small native village before Salina Cruz was chosen as the Pacific terminus of the Tehuantepec National Railway, whereupon a modern town was laid out and built on adjacent higher ground and an artificial harbour was built by the Mexican government to accommodate the expected traffic. The new port was opened to traffic in 1907 and in 1909 its population was largely composed of labourers. The harbour was formed by the construction of two breakwaters, the western 3,260 ft (990 m) and the eastern 1,900 ft (580 m) long, which curve toward each other at their outer extremities and leave an entrance 635 ft (194 m) wide. The enclosed space is divided into an outer and inner harbour by a double line of quays wide enough to carry six great warehouses with electric cranes on both sides and a number of railway tracks. Connected with the new port works was one of the then-largest dry docks in the world 610 ft (190 m) long and 89 ft (27 m) wide, with a depth of 28 ft (8.5 m) on its sill at low water. The works were planned to handle an immense volume of transcontinental freight, and before they were finished four steamship lines had arranged regular calls at Salina Cruz.

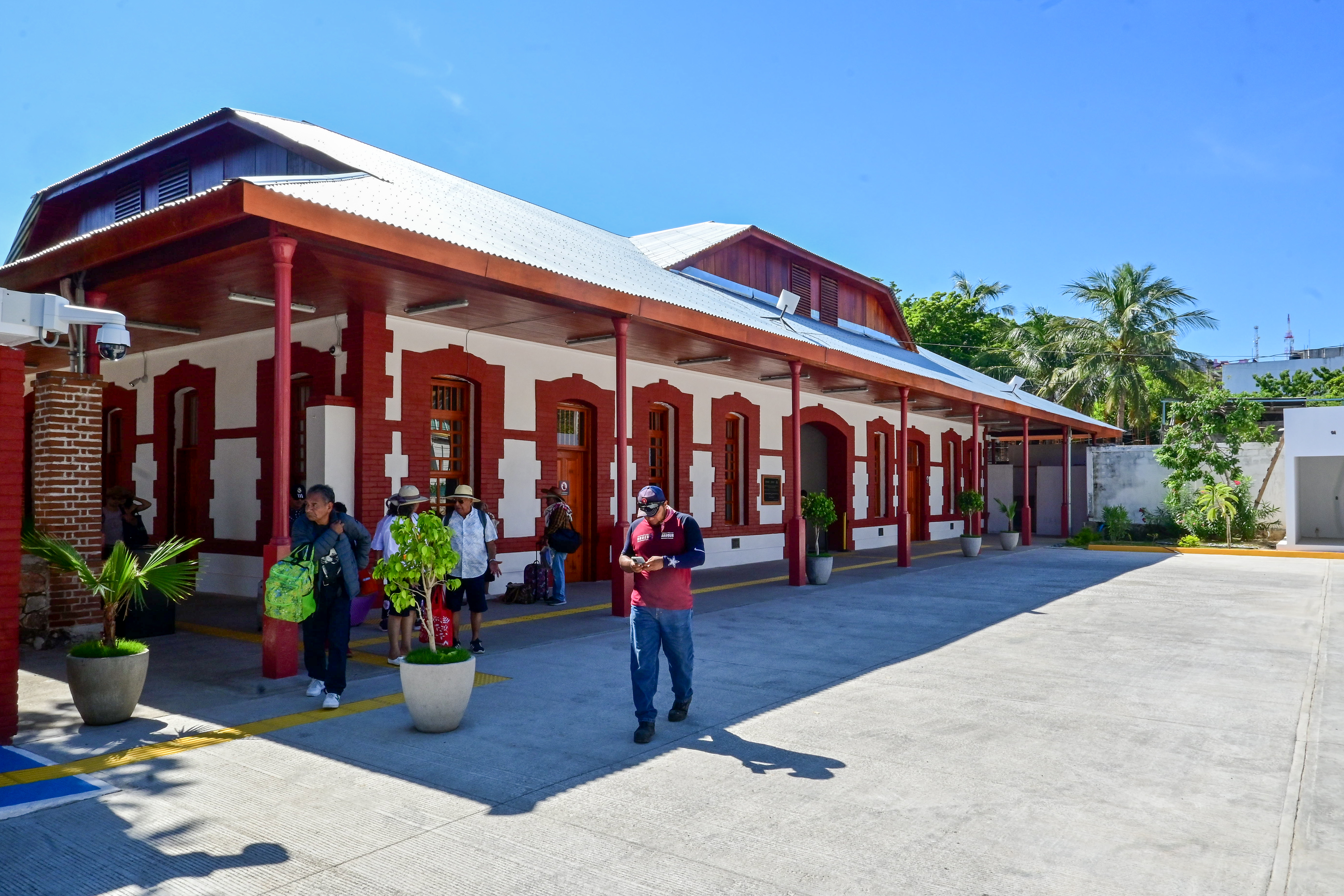
Salina Cruz railway station, restored in 2024.

== The municipality ==
As municipal seat, Salina Cruz has governing jurisdiction over the following communities:

Agua Blanca, Boca del Río, Colonia el Bosque, Colonia el Mirador, Colonia Estibadores, Colonia Granadillo, Colonia la Brecha, Colonia Miramar, Colonia Santita, Colonia Vista Hermosa, El Ciruelo, El Puentecito, Ensenada de la Ventosa, La Brecha (Rancho Moisés Aquino), La Hacienda (Palo Grande), Las Escolleras, Palo Grande, Playa Azul, Playa Brasil (Brasilito), Salinas del Marqués, San Antonio Monterrey, and San José del Palmar.

== Geography ==
=== Climate ===
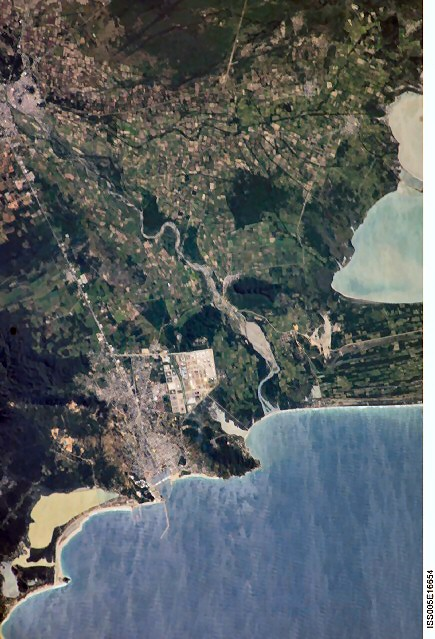
Satellite view

Salina Cruz experiences a tropical savanna climate (Köppen: Aw), with a distinct wet season from April to October and a dry season with almost no precipitation from November to March. Of the 1122.3 mm in average annual precipitation, August experiences the highest average precipitation with 300.7 mm, while February averages only 1.6 mm. Despite the coastal location, it is not uncommon for temperatures to rise to 35 °C throughout the year, and temperatures above 36 °C have been recorded in all 12 months. There is minimal temperature variation between the seasons, with only approximately a 3 °C difference in temperature averages between the hottest and coolest months. In contrast to coastal towns located on the Gulf of Mexico, Salina Cruz has never recorded a temperature below 12 °C. The city experiences ample sunshine hours, exceeding 200 hours most months and averaging 2670.6 annually.

Climate data for Salina Cruz (1981–2000)
Month	Jan	Feb	Mar	Apr	May	Jun	Jul	Aug	Sep	Oct	Nov	Dec	Year
Record high °C (°F)	38.8 (101.8)	38.8 (101.8)	39.4 (102.9)	40.3 (104.5)	41.3 (106.3)	40.0 (104.0)	38.1 (100.6)	38.0 (100.4)	37.9 (100.2)	37.0 (98.6)	36.2 (97.2)	36.2 (97.2)	41.3 (106.3)
Mean daily maximum °C (°F)	31.1 (88.0)	31.8 (89.2)	32.6 (90.7)	34.1 (93.4)	35.2 (95.4)	34.0 (93.2)	34.5 (94.1)	34.2 (93.6)	33.6 (92.5)	33.1 (91.6)	32.5 (90.5)	31.5 (88.7)	33.2 (91.8)
Daily mean °C (°F)	26.3 (79.3)	26.8 (80.2)	27.5 (81.5)	28.9 (84.0)	29.9 (85.8)	29.0 (84.2)	29.6 (85.3)	29.6 (85.3)	29.0 (84.2)	28.5 (83.3)	28.0 (82.4)	27.0 (80.6)	28.3 (82.9)
Mean daily minimum °C (°F)	21.5 (70.7)	21.7 (71.1)	22.4 (72.3)	23.7 (74.7)	24.6 (76.3)	23.9 (75.0)	24.6 (76.3)	25.0 (77.0)	24.4 (75.9)	24.0 (75.2)	23.6 (74.5)	22.4 (72.3)	23.5 (74.3)
Record low °C (°F)	15.6 (60.1)	16.2 (61.2)	16.0 (60.8)	12.6 (54.7)	18.4 (65.1)	17.8 (64.0)	19.6 (67.3)	19.8 (67.6)	19.2 (66.6)	17.9 (64.2)	17.0 (62.6)	16.6 (61.9)	12.6 (54.7)
Average precipitation mm (inches)	4.1 (0.16)	1.6 (0.06)	6.6 (0.26)	3.4 (0.13)	62.0 (2.44)	286.0 (11.26)	147.1 (5.79)	330.7 (13.02)	193.8 (7.63)	71.6 (2.82)	10.7 (0.42)	4.8 (0.19)	1,122.3 (44.19)
Average precipitation days (≥ 0.1 mm)	0.4	0.4	0.7	0.4	2.9	9.7	7.9	8.6	9.3	3.9	0.9	0.5	45.6
Average relative humidity (%)	57	59	61	61	64	67	65	66	66	63	59	58	62
Mean monthly sunshine hours	248.0	254.3	282.1	228.0	217.0	162.0	195.3	213.9	156.0	226.3	249.0	238.7	2,670.6
Mean daily sunshine hours	8.0	9.0	9.1	7.6	7.0	5.4	6.3	6.9	5.2	7.3	8.3	7.7	7.3
Source 1: Servicio Meteorológico Nacional
Source 2: Deutscher Wetterdienst (sun, 1941–1970)

== Transport ==
- Port of Salina Cruz
- Salina Cruz railway station

== See also ==
- American-Hawaiian Steamship Company
