= Tropical cyclone intensity scales =

Scales of the intensity of tropical cyclones

Tropical cyclones are ranked on one of five tropical cyclone intensity scales, according to their maximum sustained winds and which tropical cyclone basins they are located in. Only a few classifications are used officially by the meteorological agencies monitoring the tropical cyclones, but other scales also exist, such as accumulated cyclone energy, the Power Dissipation Index, the Integrated Kinetic Energy Index, and the Hurricane Severity Index.

Tropical cyclones that develop in the Northern Hemisphere are classified by the warning centres on one of three intensity scales. Tropical cyclones or subtropical cyclones that exist within the North Atlantic Ocean or the North-eastern Pacific Ocean are classified as either tropical depressions or tropical storms. Should a system intensify further and become a hurricane, then it will be classified on the Saffir–Simpson hurricane wind scale, and is based on the estimated maximum sustained winds over a 1-minute period. In the Western Pacific, the ESCAP/WMO Typhoon Committee uses four separate classifications for tropical cyclones that exist within the basin, which are based on the estimated maximum sustained winds over a 10-minute period.

The India Meteorological Department's scale uses seven different classifications for systems within the North Indian Ocean, and are based on the systems' estimated 3-minute maximum sustained winds. Tropical cyclones that develop in the Southern Hemisphere are only officially classified by the warning centres on one of two scales, which are both based on 10-minute sustained wind speeds: The Australian tropical cyclone intensity scale is used to classify systems within the Australian or South Pacific tropical cyclone basin. The scale used to classify systems in the South-West Indian Ocean is defined by Météo-France for use in various French territories, including New Caledonia and French Polynesia.

The definition of sustained winds recommended by the World Meteorological Organization (WMO) and used by most weather agencies is that of a 10-minute average at a height of 10 m (33 ft) above the sea surface. However, the Saffir–Simpson hurricane scale is based on wind speed measurements averaged over a 1-minute period, at 10 m (33 ft). The scale used by Regional Specialized Meteorological Centre (RSMC) New Delhi applies a 3-minute averaging period, and the Australian scale is based on both 3-second wind gusts and maximum sustained winds averaged over a 10-minute interval. These differences make direct comparisons between basins difficult.

Within all basins tropical cyclones are named when the sustained winds reach at least 35 kn (40 mph; 65 km/h).

== Background ==
Tropical cyclones are defined as being warm cored, non-frontal synoptic cyclones, that develop over tropical or subtropical waters, with organized atmospheric convection and have a definite cyclonic surface wind circulation. They are classified by the wind speeds located around the circulation centre and are ranked, by the World Meteorological Organization's Regional Specialized Meteorological Centers on one of five tropical cyclone scales. The scale used for a particular tropical cyclone depends on what basin the system is located in; with for example the Saffir–Simpson hurricane wind scale and the Australian tropical cyclone intensity scales both used in the Western Hemisphere. All of the scales rank tropical cyclones using their maximum sustained winds, which are either observed, measured or estimated using various techniques, over a period between one and ten minutes.

== Atlantic, Eastern and Central Pacific ==
Saffir–Simpson scale, 1-minute maximum sustained winds
Category	m/s	knots	mph	km/h
5	≥ 70	≥ 137	≥ 157	≥ 252
4	58–70	113–136	130–156	209–251
3	50–58	96–112	111–129	178–208
2	43–49	83–95	96–110	154–177
1	33–42	64–82	74–95	119–153
TS	18–32	34–63	39–73	63–118
TD	≤ 17	≤ 33	≤ 38	≤ 62

Tropical cyclones that occur within the Northern Hemisphere to the east of the anti-meridian, are officially monitored by either the National Hurricane Center or the Central Pacific Hurricane Center. Within the region a tropical cyclone is defined to be a warm cored, non-frontal synoptic disturbance, that develops over tropical or subtropical waters, with organized atmospheric convection and a closed well defined circulation centre. The region also defines a subtropical cyclone as a non-frontal low pressure disturbance, that has the characteristics of both tropical and extratropical cyclones. Once either of these classifications are met, then advisories are initiated and the warning centers will classify the system as either a tropical or subtropical depression, if the one-minute sustained winds estimated or measured as less than 34 kn (39 mph; 63 km/h).

Also, it will be assigned a tropical cyclone number (or TC number for short) comprising an officially spelled-out number (from ONE to THIRTY or less; these numbers are not recycled until next year) followed by (except for North Atlantic systems) a hyphen and a suffix letter ("-E" for East Pacific, "-C" for Central Pacific); a two-digit (plus any suffix) abbreviation (like TD 08 for North Atlantic depression EIGHT, TD 21E for East Pacific depression TWENTYONE-E, or TD 03C for Central Pacific depression THREE-C) is also generated for bulletin and other automated purposes.

However, if a tropical disturbance is capable of producing tropical storm or hurricane conditions on land within 48 hours, then advisories will be initiated and it will be classified as a potential tropical cyclone (PTC) with a two-digit PTC number (for example, PTC-09 or PTC-15E) that otherwise looks identical to a TC number. Should the system intensify further or already have one-minute sustained winds of 34–63 kn (39–72 mph; 63–117 km/h), then it will be called either a tropical or subtropical storm and assigned a name (which replaces the spelled-out TC number; the two-digit number is still kept for purposes like the Automated Tropical Cyclone Forecasting System, as in 2018's TS 12 (KIRK)).

Should the tropical system further intensify and have winds estimated or measured, as greater than 64 kn (74 mph; 119 km/h), then it will be called a hurricane and classified on the Saffir–Simpson hurricane wind scale. The lowest classification on the SSHWS is a Category 1 hurricane, which has winds of between 64 and 82 kn (74 and 94 mph; 119 and 152 km/h). Should the hurricane intensify further then it will be rated as a Category 2 hurricane, if it has winds of between 83 and 95 kn (96 and 109 mph; 154 and 176 km/h). When a system becomes a Category 3 hurricane with winds of between 96 and 112 kn (110 and 129 mph; 178 and 207 km/h), it is considered to be a major hurricane by the warning centers. A Category 4 hurricane has winds of 113 to 136 kn (130 to 157 mph; 209 to 252 km/h), while a Category 5 hurricane has winds of at least 137 kn (158 mph; 254 km/h). A post tropical cyclone is a system that has weakened, into a remnant low or has dissipated and formal advisories are usually discontinued at this stage. However, advisories may continue if the post tropical cyclone poses a significant threat to life and property. They may also continue if the remnants of the system have a chance of regeneration and producing tropical storm or hurricane-force winds over land within 48 hours.

The SSHS was originally created using both wind speed and storm surge, but since the relationship between wind speed and storm surge is not necessarily definite, the scale was changed to the "Saffir–Simpson Hurricane Wind Scale" (SSHWS), based entirely on wind speed.

Although increasing echelons of the scale correspond to stronger winds, the rankings are not absolute in terms of effects. Lower-category storms can inflict greater damage than higher-category storms, depending on factors such as local terrain, population density and total rainfall. For instance, a Category 2 hurricane that strikes a major urban area will likely do more damage than a large Category 5 hurricane that strikes a mostly rural region. In fact, tropical systems of less than hurricane strength, as in the case of Tropical Storm Allison, can produce significant damage and human casualties, especially from flooding and landslides.

Historically, the term great hurricane was used to describe storms that possessed winds of at least 110 knots (130 mph; 200 km/h), large radii (over 160 km / 100 mi) and that caused large amounts of destruction. This term fell into disuse after the introduction of the Saffir–Simpson scale in the early 1970s.

A minor change to the scale was made ahead of the 2012 hurricane season, with the wind speeds for Categories 3–5 tweaked to eliminate the rounding errors that had occurred during previous seasons, when a hurricane had wind speeds of 115 kn (130 mph; 215 km/h).

== Western Pacific ==
RSMC Tokyo's Tropical Cyclone Intensity Scale
Category	Sustained winds
Violent Typhoon	≥105 knots ≥194 km/h
Very Strong Typhoon	85–104 knots 157–193 km/h
Typhoon	64–84 knots 118–156 km/h
Severe Tropical Storm	48–63 knots 89–117 km/h
Tropical Storm	34–47 knots 62–88 km/h
Tropical Depression	≤33 knots ≤61 km/h

Tropical cyclones that occur within the Northern Hemisphere between the anti-meridian and 100°E are officially monitored by the Japan Meteorological Agency (JMA, RSMC Tokyo). Within the region a tropical cyclone is defined to be a non-frontal synoptic scale cyclone originating over tropical or sub-tropical waters, with organized convection and a definite cyclonic surface wind circulation. The lowest classification used by the Typhoon Committee is a tropical depression, which has 10-minute sustained winds of less than 34 kn (17 m/s; 39 mph; 63 km/h). Should the tropical depression intensify further it is named and classified as a tropical storm, which has winds speeds between 34–47 kn (17–24 m/s; 39–54 mph; 63–87 km/h). Should the system continue to intensify further then it will be classified as a severe tropical storm, which has winds speeds between 48–63 kn (25–32 m/s; 55–72 mph; 89–117 km/h). The highest classification on the Typhoon Committee's scale is a typhoon, which has winds speeds greater than 64 kn (33 m/s; 74 mph; 119 km/h).

The China Meteorological Administration, the Hong Kong Observatory (HKO), Macao Meteorological and Geophysical Bureau (SMG), PAGASA and the JMA, all divide the typhoon category further for domestic purposes. The JMA divides the typhoon category into three categories, with a 10-minute maximum wind speed below 84 kn (43 m/s; 97 mph; 156 km/h) assigned for the (strong) typhoon category. A very strong typhoon has wind speeds between 85–104 kn (44–54 m/s; 98–120 mph; 157–193 km/h), while a violent typhoon has wind speeds of 105 kn (54 m/s; 121 mph; 194 km/h) or greater. The HKO, SMG and the CMA also divide the typhoon category into three categories, with both assigning a maximum wind speed of 80 kn (41 m/s; 92 mph; 150 km/h) to the typhoon category. A severe typhoon has wind speeds of 85–104 kn (44–54 m/s; 98–120 mph; 157–193 km/h), while a super typhoon has winds of 100 kn (51 m/s; 120 mph; 190 km/h). In May 2015, following the damage caused by Typhoon Haiyan in 2013, PAGASA introduced the term Super Typhoon and used it for systems with winds greater than 120 kn (62 m/s; 140 mph; 220 km/h), but later adjusted to at least 99.9 kn (51.4 m/s; 115.0 mph; 185.0 km/h) on March 23, 2022. In 2018, following devastating damage caused by Typhoon Hato to Macau, SMG introduced the super typhoon (Portuguese: Super tufão) category together with the severe typhoon (Portuguese: Tufão severo) category as that of HKO.

In addition to the national meteorological services of each nation, the United States' Joint Typhoon Warning Center (JTWC) monitors the basin, and issues warnings on significant tropical cyclones for the United States Government, assigning them two-digit TC numbers (with suffix "W"). These warnings use a 1-minute sustained wind speed and can be compared to the Saffir–Simpson hurricane wind scale; however, the JTWC uses their own scale for intensity classifications in this basin. These classifications are Tropical Depression, Tropical Storm, Typhoon, and Super Typhoon. The United States' Joint Typhoon Warning Center (JTWC) classifies typhoons with wind speeds of at least 130 knots (150 mph; 240 km/h)—the equivalent of a strong Category 4 storm on the Saffir–Simpson scale—as super typhoons. Also, when a tropical depression is upgraded to tropical storm and named by the JMA, the JTWC appends the international name (parenthesized) to its TC number (i.e., 2018 tropical depression TWENTY-W, abbr. TD 20W, became Tropical Storm Bebinca, but was referred to as TS 20W (BEBINCA) in JTWC advisories); however, in cases when the JTWC upgrades a depression to tropical storm without the JMA following suit (due to the differences between JTWC and JMA wind-speed scales), the spelled-out number (without the suffix) is parenthesized and appended to the TC number as placeholder name, as in TS 16W (SIXTEEN), until JMA upgrades and names it, in which case the name replaces the placeholder.

In addition, the Taiwan Central Weather Administration has its own scale in Chinese but uses the Typhoon Committee scale in English.

== North Indian Ocean ==
India Meteorological Department Tropical Cyclone Intensity Scale
Category	Sustained winds (3-min average)
Super Cyclonic Storm	≥120 kt ≥221 km/h
Extremely Severe Cyclonic Storm	90–119 kt 166–220 km/h
Very Severe Cyclonic Storm	64–89 kt 118–165 km/h
Severe Cyclonic Storm	48–63 kt 89–117 km/h
Cyclonic Storm	34–47 kt 63–88 km/h
Deep Depression	28–33 kt 51–62 km/h
Depression	17–27 kt 31–50 km/h

Any tropical cyclone that develops within the North Indian Ocean between 100°E and 45°E is monitored by the India Meteorological Department (IMD, RSMC New Delhi). Within the region, a tropical cyclone is defined as being a non frontal synoptic scale cyclone that originates over tropical or subtropical waters with organized convection and a definite cyclonic surface wind circulation. The lowest official classification used in the North Indian Ocean is a depression, which has 3-minute sustained wind speeds of between 17 and 27 kn (20 and 31 mph; 31 and 50 km/h). Should the depression intensify further then it will become a deep depression, which has winds between 28 and 33 kn (32 and 38 mph; 52 and 61 km/h). If the system intensifies further, it will be classified as a cyclonic storm and be assigned a name by the IMD, if it should develop gale-force wind speeds of between 34 and 47 kn (39 and 54 mph; 63 and 87 km/h). Severe cyclonic storms have wind speeds between 48 and 63 kn (55 and 72 mph; 89 and 117 km/h), while very severe cyclonic storms have hurricane-force winds of 64–89 kn (74–102 mph; 119–165 km/h). Extremely severe cyclonic storms have hurricane-force winds of 90–119 kn (104–137 mph; 167–220 km/h). The highest classification used in the North Indian Ocean is a super cyclonic storm, which has hurricane-force winds of at least 120 kn (140 mph; 220 km/h).

Historically, a system has been classified as a depression if its surface pressure is lower than its surroundings. Other classifications historically used include: cyclonic storm where the winds did not exceed force 10 on the Beaufort scale and a Cyclone where the winds are either force 11 and 12 on the Beaufort scale. Between 1924 and 1988, tropical cyclones were classified into four categories: depression, deep depression, cyclonic storms and severe cyclonic storms. However, a change was made during 1988 to introduce the category "severe cyclonic storm with core of hurricane winds" for tropical cyclones, with wind speeds of more than 64 kn (74 mph; 119 km/h). During 1999 the categories very severe cyclonic Storm and super cyclonic storm were introduced, while the severe cyclonic storm with a core of hurricane winds category was eliminated. During 2015, another modification to the scale took place, with the IMD calling a system with 3-minute maximum sustained wind speeds between 90 and 119 kn (104 and 137 mph; 167 and 220 km/h): an extremely severe cyclonic storm.

The American Joint Typhoon Warning Center also monitors the basin, and issues warnings on significant tropical cyclones on behalf of the United States, also assigning them TC numbers as in all other basins above (albeit in an unofficial manner for this and subsequent basins; cyclones originating in the Arabian Sea are assigned suffix "A" while those in the Bay of Bengal get suffix "B"). These warnings use a 1-minute sustained wind speed and can be compared to the Saffir–Simpson hurricane wind scale, however, regardless of intensity in this basin the JTWC labels all systems as tropical cyclones with TC numbers (optionally appended with international names or placeholders in parentheses, as done for typhoons above).

== South-West Indian Ocean ==
Southwest Indian Ocean Tropical Cyclone Intensity Scale
Category	Sustained winds
Very Intense Tropical Cyclone	>115 kt >212 km/h
Intense Tropical Cyclone	90–115 kt 166–212 km/h
Tropical Cyclone	64–89 kt 118–165 km/h
Severe Tropical Storm	48–63 kt 89–117 km/h
Moderate Tropical Storm	34–47 kt 63–88 km/h
Tropical Depression	28–33 kt 51–62 km/h
Tropical Disturbance	<28 kt <50 km/h

Any tropical cyclone that develops within the Southern Hemisphere between Africa and 90°E is monitored by Météo-France's La Réunion tropical cyclone centre (MFR, RSMC La Réunion).

A tropical disturbance is MFR's generic term for a non-frontal area of low pressure that has organized convection and definite cyclonic surface wind circulation. The system should be estimated to have wind speeds of less than 28 knots (52 km/h; 32 mph).

A system is designated as a tropical depression or a subtropical depression when it reaches 10 min sustained wind speeds above 28 knots (52 km/h; 32 mph). If a tropical depression reaches wind speeds of 35 knots (65 km/h; 40 mph) then it will be classified as a moderate tropical storm and assigned a name by either the Sub Regional Center in Mauritius or Madagascar. Since the 2024–25 cyclone season, a subtropical system will be classified as a subtropical storm if it reaches wind speeds of 35 knots (65 km/h; 40 mph).

If the named tropical system intensifies further and reaches winds speeds of 48 knots (89 km/h; 55 mph), then it will be classified as a severe tropical storm. A severe tropical storm is designated as a tropical cyclone when it reaches wind speeds of 64 knots (119 km/h; 74 mph). If a tropical cyclone intensify further and reaches wind speeds of 90 knots (170 km/h; 100 mph), it will be classified as an intense tropical cyclone. A very intense tropical cyclone is the highest category on the South-West Indian Ocean Tropical Cyclone scale, and has winds of over 115 knots (213 km/h; 132 mph).

At the tenth RA I tropical cyclone committee held during 1991, it was recommended that the intensity classifications be changed ahead of the 1993–94 tropical cyclone season. Specifically it was decided that the classifications: Weak Tropical Depression, Moderate Tropical Depression and Severe Tropical Depression would be changed to Tropical Depression, Moderate Tropical Storm and Severe Tropical Storm. This change was implemented ahead of the 1993–94 tropical cyclone season.

The United States Joint Typhoon Warning Center also monitors the basin, and issues warnings on significant tropical cyclones on behalf of the United States Government; these systems are unofficially assigned TC numbers with suffix "S" (which spans the whole South Indian Ocean, including both BMKG and BoM areas of responsibility west of 135°E). These warnings use a 1-minute sustained wind speed and can be compared to the Saffir–Simpson hurricane wind scale, however, regardless of intensity in this basin the JTWC labels all systems as tropical cyclones with TC numbers (plus any parenthesized names or placeholders, like typhoons and North Indian Ocean cyclones above).

== Australia and Fiji ==
Australian tropical cyclone intensity scale
Category	Sustained winds	Gusts
Five	>107 kn (198 km/h; 123 mph)	>151 kn (280 km/h; 174 mph)
Four	86–107 kn (159–198 km/h; 99–123 mph)	122–151 kn (226–280 km/h; 140–174 mph)
Three	64–85 kn (119–157 km/h; 74–98 mph)	90–121 kn (167–224 km/h; 104–139 mph)
Two	48–63 kn (89–117 km/h; 55–72 mph)	68–89 kn (126–165 km/h; 78–102 mph)
One	34–47 kn (63–87 km/h; 39–54 mph)	49–67 kn (91–124 km/h; 56–77 mph)

Tropical cyclones that occur within the Southern Hemisphere to the east of 90°E are officially monitored by one or more tropical cyclone warning centres. These are run by the Fiji Meteorological Service, New Zealand's MetService, Indonesia's Badan Meteorologi, Klimatologi, dan Geofisika, Papua New Guinea's National Weather Service and the Australian Bureau of Meteorology. Within the region a tropical cyclone is defined as being a non-frontal low-pressure system of synoptic scale that develops over warm waters, with a definite organized wind circulation and 10-minute sustained wind speeds of 34 kn (63 km/h; 39 mph) or greater near the centre. Once this definition has been met then all of the centres name the system and start to use the Australian tropical cyclone intensity scale, which measures tropical cyclones using a five category system based on 10-minute maximum sustained winds. A Category 1 tropical cyclone is estimated to have 10-minute sustained wind speeds of 34–47 kn (39–54 mph; 63–87 km/h), while a Category 2 tropical cyclone is estimated to have 10-minute sustained wind speeds of 48–63 kn (55–72 mph; 89–117 km/h). When a system becomes a Category 3 tropical cyclone it is reclassified as a Severe tropical cyclone and has wind speeds of 64–85 kn (74–98 mph; 119–157 km/h). A Category 4 severe tropical cyclone has winds of 86–110 kn (99–127 mph; 159–204 km/h), while the maximum rating is a Category 5 severe tropical cyclone, which has winds of at least 108 kn (124 mph; 200 km/h).

For systems below tropical cyclone strength there are various terms used, including Tropical Disturbance, Tropical Low and Tropical Depression. A tropical disturbance is defined as being a non-frontal system of synoptic scale originating over the tropics, with persistent enhanced convection or some indication of a circulation. A tropical depression or tropical low is a disturbance with a defined circulation, where the central position can be estimated, and the maximum 10-minute average wind speed is less than 34 kn (39 mph; 63 km/h) near the centre. The FMS numbers these systems when they have a potential to develop into a tropical cyclone or persist to cause significant impact to life and property, within its area of responsibility and have been analysed for the previous 24 hours. The Australian tropical cyclone intensity scale was introduced by the BoM, ahead of the 1989–90 cyclone season.

The United States Joint Typhoon Warning Center also monitors the basin, and issues warnings on significant tropical cyclones on behalf of the United States Government; these systems are unofficially assigned TC numbers with either suffix "S" (if originating west of 135°E; spans the whole South Indian Ocean, including MFR's area of responsibility) or suffix "P" (if east of 135°E; spans the whole South Pacific Ocean, merging BoM, PNG-NWS, FMS, and MSNZ AORs together). These warnings use a 1-minute sustained wind speed and can be compared to the Saffir–Simpson hurricane wind scale, however, regardless of intensity in these basins the JTWC labels all systems as tropical cyclones with TC numbers (plus any names or placeholders parenthesized, as for typhoons and Indian Ocean cyclones above).

== Alternative scales ==
There are other scales that are not officially used by any of the Regional Specialized Meteorological Centres or the Tropical Cyclone Warning Centres. However they are used by other organizations, such as the National Oceanic and Atmospheric Administration. An example of such scale is the Integrated Kinetic Energy index, which measures the destructive potential of the storm surge on the coast; it works on a scale that ranges from one to six, with six having the highest destructive potential.

=== Accumulated cyclone energy (ACE) ===
Accumulated cyclone energy (ACE) is used by the National Oceanic and Atmospheric Administration and other agencies to express the activity of individual tropical cyclones that are above tropical storm strength and entire tropical cyclone seasons. It is calculated by taking the squares of the estimated maximum sustained velocity of every active tropical storm (wind speed 35 knots or higher) at six-hour intervals. The numbers are usually divided by 10,000 to make them more manageable. The unit of ACE is 10^{4} kn^{2}, and for use as an index the unit is assumed. As well as being squared for ACE, wind speed can also be cubed, which is referred to as the Power Dissipation Index (PDI).

=== Hurricane Severity Index (HSI) ===
The Hurricane Severity Index (HSI) is another scale used and rates the severity of all types of tropical and subtropical cyclones based on both the intensity and the size of their wind fields. The HSI is a 0 to 50 point scale, allotting up to 25 points for a tropical cyclone's intensity and up to 25 points for wind field size. Points are awarded on a sliding scale, with the majority of points reserved for hurricane force and greater wind fields. A paper describing the scale was published in 2008. HSI was developed by ImpactWeather (now StormGeo) meteorologists as a proprietary method of hurricane severity classification. HSI misclassifies hurricanes in some cases because it does not account for rainfall. HSI is based on a lookup table rather than an equation. It does not take into account the translational speed of the storm.

== See also ==
- Chicago Mercantile Exchange Hurricane Index
- Dvorak technique – Subjective technique to estimate tropical cyclone intensity
- Rapid intensification – Dramatic increase in a tropical cyclone's strength
- Tropical cyclone naming – Tables of names for tropical cyclones
- Waffle House Index – Informal metric to rate disaster severity
- Hypercane – Hypothetical class of extreme tropical cyclone
