= Invest (meteorology) =

Area of weather monitored for cyclones

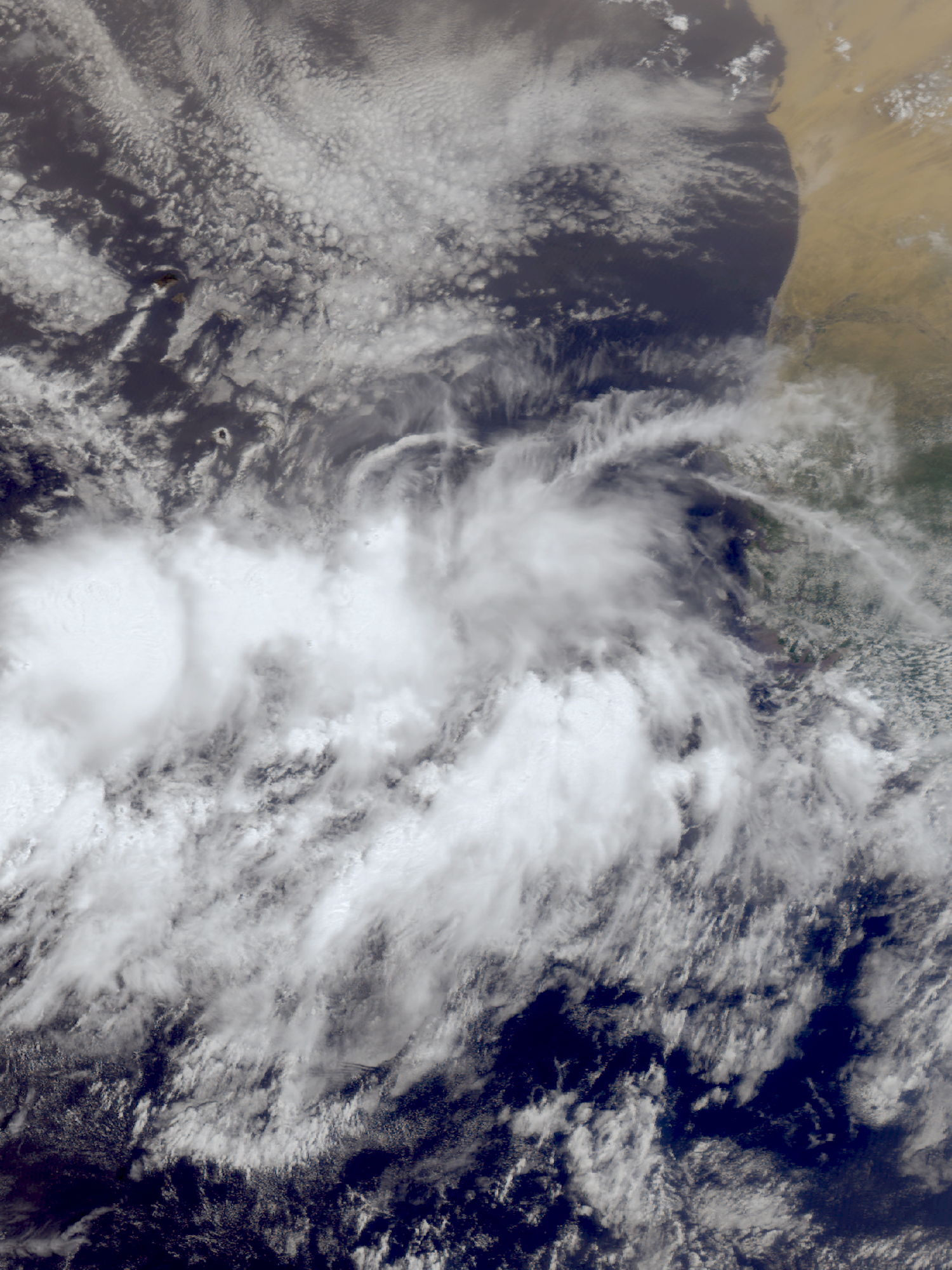
Invest 97L emerging off the coast of Africa on August 8, 2022. Note the cyclonic shape.

In meteorology, an invest (short for "investigative area") is a designated area of disturbed weather that is monitored for potential tropical cyclone (TC) development. Invests (also called areas of interest) are designated by three separate forecast centers located in the United States: the National Hurricane Center in Miami, Florida, overseeing the North Atlantic and North Eastern Pacific basins (east of the 140°W meridian); the Central Pacific Hurricane Center in Honolulu, Hawaii, monitoring the North Central Pacific basin (between the International Date Line and the 140°W meridian); and the military Joint Typhoon Warning Center in Pearl Harbor, Hawaii (formerly located in the island of Guam), serving U.S. government interests elsewhere (i.e. the North Western Pacific basin west of the International Date Line). The designation of a system as an invest does not necessarily correspond to any particular likelihood of development of the system into a tropical cyclone (tropical depression, tropical storm, or hurricane/typhoon).

== Designation ==
INVEST Numbering (NHC/CPHC/JTWC)
Basin(s)	Warning Center	Suffix	Rolling numbers
N Atlantic	NHC	L	from Invest-90L to Invest-99L
NE Pacific (E of 140°W)	NHC	E	from Invest-90E to Invest-99E
NC Pacific (E of IDL, W of 140°W)	CPHC	C	from Invest-90C to Invest-99C
NW Pacific (W of IDL)	JTWC	W	from Invest-90W to Invest-99W
N Indian O. (Bay of Bengal)	JTWC (unoff.)	B	from Invest-90B to Invest-99B
N Indian O. (Arabian Sea)	JTWC (unoff.)	A	from Invest-90A to Invest-99A
SW Indian O. & Australian reg. (W of 135°E)	JTWC (unoff.)	S	from Invest-90S to Invest-99S
Australian reg. & S Pacific (E of 135°E)	JTWC (unoff.)	P	from Invest-90P to Invest-99P
S Atlantic	NRL, NHC (unoff.)	Q	from Invest-90Q to Invest-99Q
Mediterranean	SAB (unoff.)	M	from Invest-90M to Invest-99M

Invests are numbered from 90 to 99, followed by a suffix letter "L" in the North Atlantic basin, "E" and "C" in the Eastern and Central Pacific basins (respectively), or "W" in the Western Pacific basin.

The Joint Typhoon Warning Center also issues unofficial warnings for U.S. government interests (predominantly military) in the Southern Hemisphere, designating tropical invests with the "S" suffix when they form west of 135°E (this spans the whole South Indian Ocean, including the South-Western Indian Ocean basin and the western half of the Australian-region basin), and the "P" suffix when they form east of 135°E (spans both the eastern half of the Australian region and the South Pacific basin). In addition, invests in the North Indian Ocean cyclone basin are also labelled by the JTWC, and are suffixed with "A" if they form in the Arabian Sea and with "B" if they form in the Bay of Bengal.

The Naval Research Laboratory's Marine Meteorology Division also uses the "Q" suffix to designate invests which form in the South Atlantic Ocean, even though it is not recognized as an official tropical cyclone basin by the World Meteorological Organization.

These suffix letters (with the usual exception of "L") are also used with the tropical cyclone numbers (TC numbers for short) assigned to tropical and subtropical depressions (and potential tropical cyclones) monitored by the NHC & CPHC (North Atlantic systems are usually designated by TC numbers without a suffix letter; the "L" is still used, however, by the NRL for this basin) and all tropical, subtropical, and potential tropical cyclones tracked by the JTWC.

== Number rotation ==
Numbers are rotated within the season and are re-used as necessary (the next invest after 99 would be numbered 90). In contrast, TC numbers start each year/season with 01 and run upwards, usually up to 30 in NHC and CPHC-monitored basins. The hard-coded limit imposed by the Automated Tropical Cyclone Forecasting System is 49. TC numbers assigned to proper cyclones (tropical, subtropical, and potential tropical) are not recycled until the following year/season. If the invest system develops into a (sub)tropical cyclone, it is reclassified as the next name/number on the list. This is a TC number if evolving into a depression or JTWC cyclone; or a name if evolving quickly into a tropical or subtropical storm, bypassing the depression stage).
