= Timeline of the 1991 Pacific hurricane season =

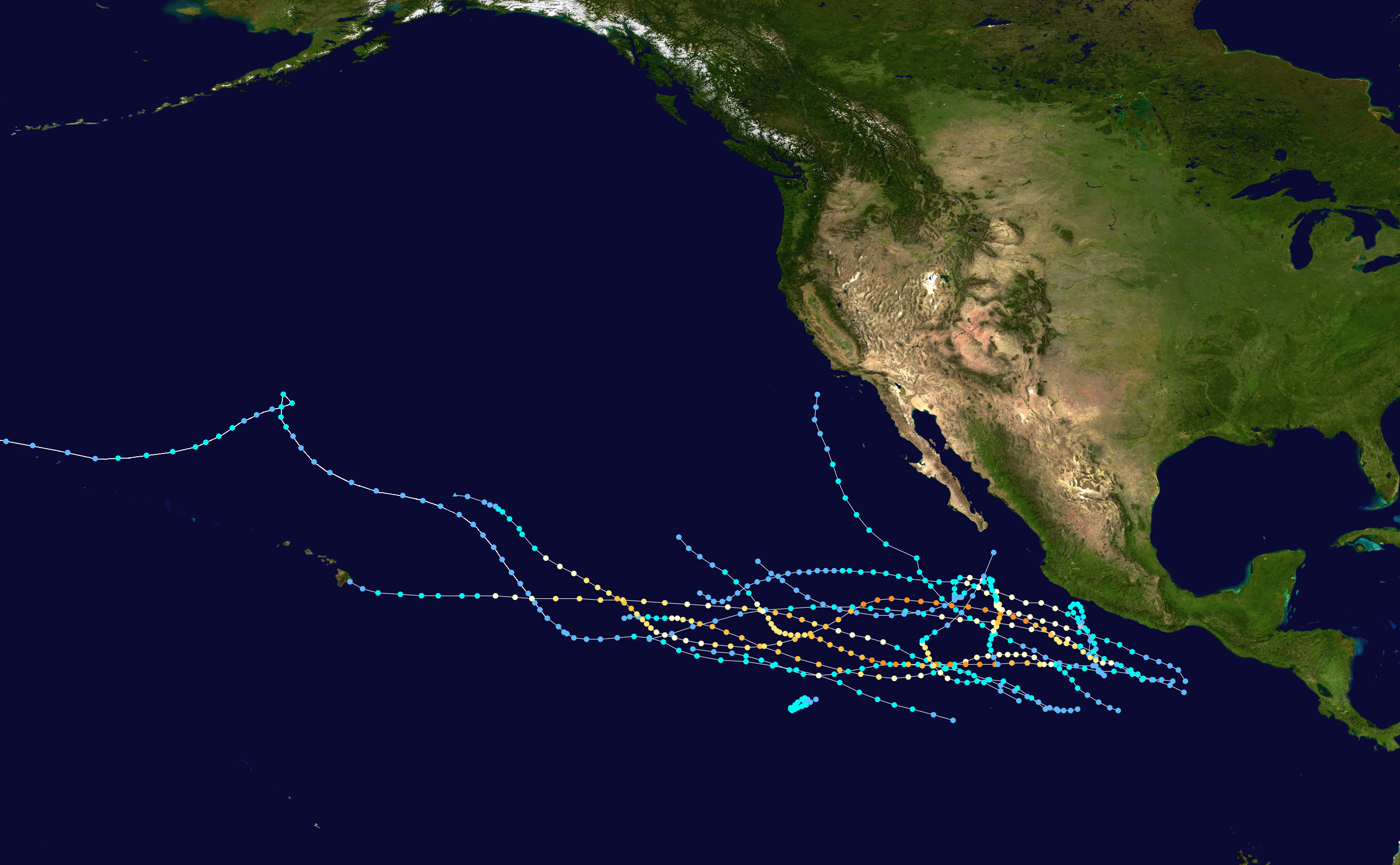
- Season summary map

Season boundaries
- First system formed: May 16, 1991
- Last system dissipated: November 12, 1991

Strongest system
- Name: Kevin
- Maximum winds: 145 mph (230 km/h) (1-minute sustained)
- Lowest pressure: 935 mbar (hPa; 27.61 inHg)

Longest lasting system
- Name: Kevin
- Duration: 17.25 days
Storm articles
- None

The 1991 Pacific hurricane season was the annual cycle of tropical cyclone formation over the Pacific Ocean north of the equator and east of the International Date Line. The season officially began on May 15 in the Eastern Pacific basin proper (east of 140°W) and June 1 in the Central Pacific basin (140°W to the International Date Line), and ended on November 30 in both areas. This is historically the period during which most tropical cyclogenesis occurs in these respective areas. The first system, Tropical Storm Andres, formed on May 16; the final system, Hurricane Nora, dissipated on November 12.

Activity during the 1991 season was irregular, with intense bursts of activity punctured by lulls which occurred during climatologically busy periods. A near-average total of 14 named tropical storms ultimately developed, though most were strong or long-lasting. (Note: During the period from 1991 to 2020, an average Pacific hurricane season generated 15 tropical storms, eight hurricanes, and four major hurricanes.) Ten strengthened into hurricanes, of which five became major hurricanes by reaching Category 3 or higher on the five-level Saffir–Simpson scale. Hurricane Kevin, the strongest storm of the season, spent 12 days as a hurricane east of 140°W, setting a basin record. The season also produced two tropical depressions that did not attain tropical storm status. No tropical cyclones formed in the Central Pacific basin, though three crossed 140°W from the east, two of which—Fefa and Kevin—did so as hurricanes.

The only system to make landfall this season was Tropical Depression Five-E, which struck Mexico near Salina Cruz in late June, though the remnants of Hurricane Fefa passed directly over Hawaii after it dissipated nearby. While its center remained offshore, the outer rainbands of Tropical Storm Ignacio produced torrential rainfall in Mexico. Flooding and mudslides killed 23 people: 10 in Guerrero, and 13 in Chihuahua.

This timeline documents tropical cyclone formations, strengthening, weakening, landfalls, extratropical transitions, and dissipations during the season. It includes information that was not released during the season, meaning that data from post-storm reviews by the National Hurricane Center (NHC) and the Central Pacific Hurricane Center (CPHC) has been included.

The time stamp for each event is first stated using Coordinated Universal Time (UTC), the 24-hour clock where 00:00 = midnight UTC. The NHC uses both UTC and the time zone where the center of the tropical cyclone was then located. Prior to 2015, two time zones were utilized in the Eastern Pacific basin: Pacific for the Eastern Pacific, and Hawaii−Aleutian for the Central Pacific. In this timeline, the respective area time is included in parentheses. Additionally, figures for maximum sustained winds and position estimates are rounded to the nearest 5 units (miles, or kilometers), following NHC practice. Direct wind observations are rounded to the nearest whole number. Atmospheric pressures are listed to the nearest millibar and nearest hundredth of an inch of mercury.

== Timeline of events ==
=== May ===
May 15

- The 1991 Eastern Pacific hurricane season officially begins.

May 16

- 06:00 UTC (11:00 p.m. PDT, May 15) at 10.7°N 122.5°W – Tropical Depression One-E forms from an area of unsettled weather about 1,180 mi (1,900 km) southwest of the southern tip of the Baja California peninsula.

May 17

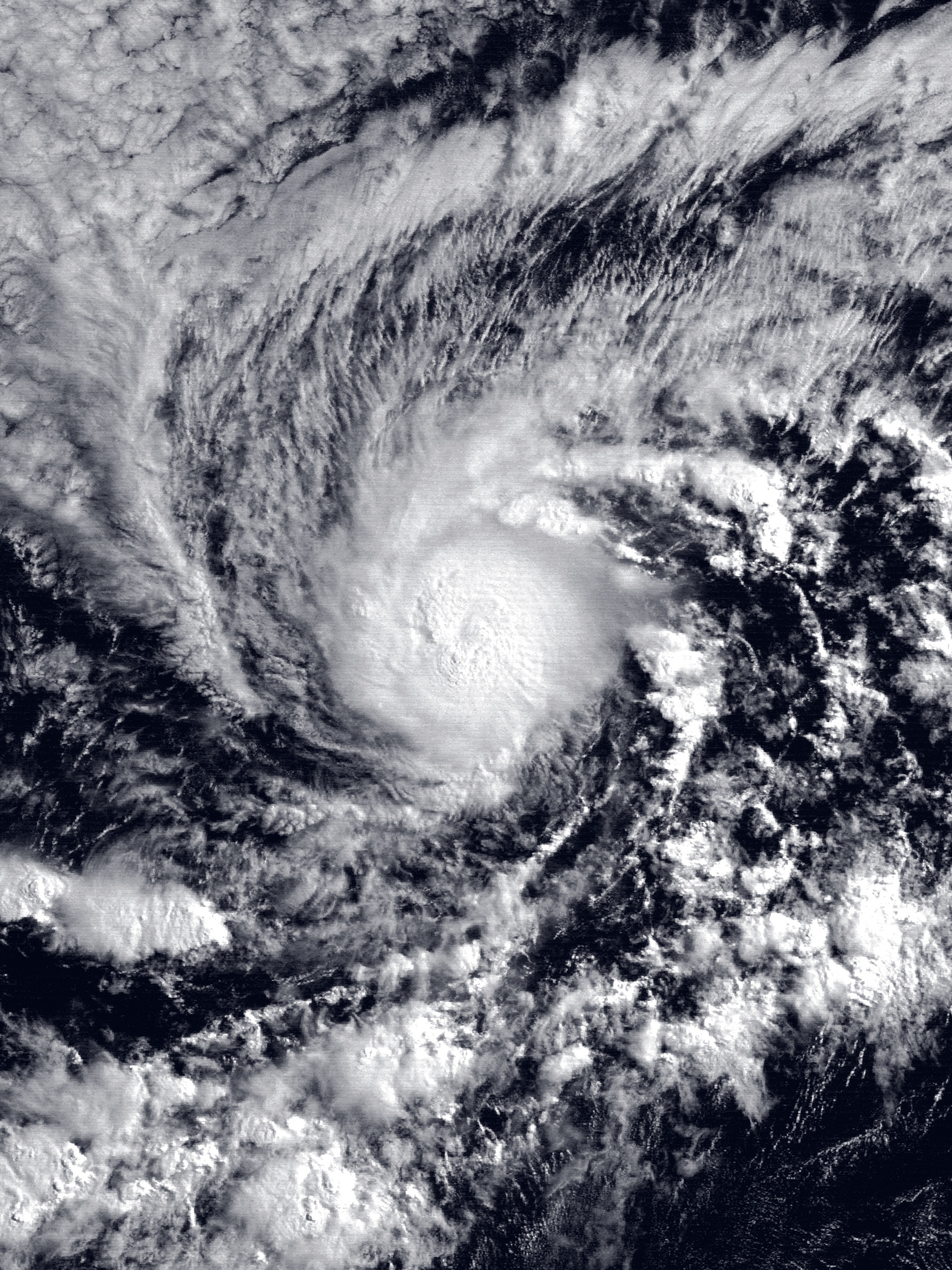
Tropical Storm Andres at peak intensity on May 17

- 00:00 UTC (5:00 p.m. PDT, May 16) at 11.0°N 122.5°W – Tropical Depression One-E strengthens into Tropical Storm Andres about 1,160 mi (1,870 km) southwest of the southern tip of the Baja California peninsula.
- 12:00 UTC (5:00 a.m. PDT) at 10.7°N 123.0°W – Tropical Storm Andres attains its peak intensity, with maximum sustained winds of 65 mph (100 km/h) and a minimum central pressure of 994 mbar (29.35 inHg), about 1,205 mi (1,935 km) southwest of the southern tip of the Baja California peninsula.

May 19

- 18:00 UTC (11:00 a.m. PDT) at 10.7°N 122.1°W – Tropical Storm Andres weakens into a tropical depression about 1,160 mi (1,870 km) southwest of the southern tip of the Baja California peninsula.

May 20

- 00:00 UTC (5:00 p.m. PDT, May 19) at 10.9°N 121.7°W – Tropical Depression Andres is last noted as a tropical cyclone about 1,135 mi (1,825 km) southwest of the southern tip of the Baja California peninsula, dissipating shortly thereafter.

=== June ===
June 1

- The 1991 Central Pacific hurricane season officially begins.

June 14

- 18:00 UTC (11:00 a.m. PDT) at 10.2°N 103.0°W – Tropical Depression Two-E forms from a tropical wave about 505 mi (815 km) south-southwest of Acapulco, Guerrero.

June 16

- 12:00 UTC (5:00 a.m. PDT) at 11.4°N 95.4°W – Tropical Depression Three-E forms from a tropical wave about 330 mi (530 km) south of Salina Cruz, Oaxaca.

June 17

- 00:00 UTC (5:00 p.m. PDT, June 16) at 12.3°N 109.4°W – Tropical Depression Two-E strengthens into Tropical Storm Blanca about 730 mi (1,175 km) south of the southern tip of the Baja California peninsula.
- 00:00 UTC (5:00 p.m. PDT, June 16) at 12.3°N 97.6°W – Tropical Depression Three-E strengthens into Tropical Storm Carlos about 310 mi (500 km) south-southwest of Salina Cruz.

June 18

- 18:00 UTC (11:00 a.m. PDT) at 13.4°N 105.4°W – Tropical Storm Carlos strengthens into a Category 1 hurricane on the Saffir–Simpson scale about 710 mi (1,140 km) west-southwest of Salina Cruz, or about 720 mi (1,160 km) south-southeast of the southern tip of the Baja California peninsula.

June 20

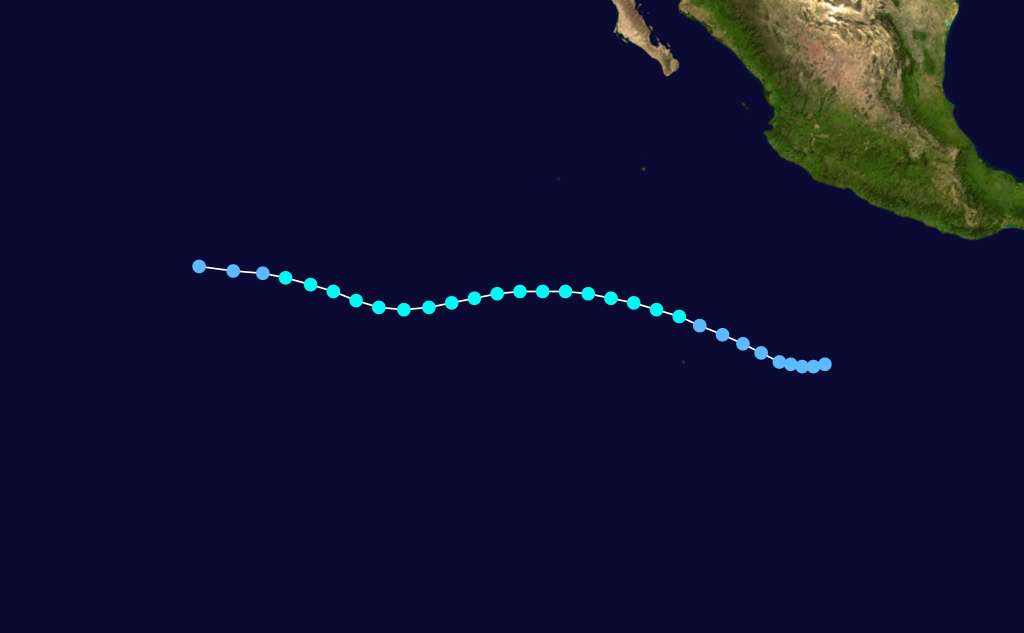
Storm path of Tropical Storm Blanca

- 00:00 UTC (5:00 p.m. PDT, June 19) at 12.6°N 121.5°W – Tropical Storm Blanca attains its peak intensity, with maximum sustained winds of 65 mph (100 km/h) and a minimum central pressure of 994 mbar (29.35 inHg), about 1,035 mi (1,665 km) southwest of the southern tip of the Baja California peninsula.

June 21

- 00:00 UTC (5:00 p.m. PDT, June 20) at 13.4°N 111.8°W – Hurricane Carlos weakens into a tropical storm about 665 mi (1,075 km) south of the southern tip of the Baja California peninsula.
- 12:00 UTC (5:00 a.m. PDT) at 14.2°N 127.7°W – Tropical Storm Blanca weakens into a tropical depression about 1,305 mi (2,100 km) west-southwest of the southern tip of the Baja California peninsula.
- 18:00 UTC (11:00 a.m. PDT) at 12.6°N 114.2°W – Tropical Storm Carlos restrengthens into a Category 1 hurricane about 760 mi (1,220 km) south-southwest of the southern tip of the Baja California peninsula.

June 22

- 00:00 UTC (5:00 p.m. PDT, June 21) at 14.5°N 130.5°W – Tropical Depression Blanca is last noted as a tropical cyclone about 1,460 mi (2,350 km) west-southwest of the southern tip of the Baja California peninsula, dissipating shortly thereafter.
- 12:00 UTC (5:00 a.m. PDT) at 12.5°N 117.2°W – Hurricane Carlos strengthens to Category 2 intensity about 855 mi (1,380 km) southwest of the southern tip of the Baja California peninsula.
- 12:00 UTC (5:00 a.m. PDT) at 12.6°N 101.1°W – Tropical Depression Four-E forms from a tropical wave about 495 mi (795 km) south-southeast of Manzanillo, Colima.

June 23

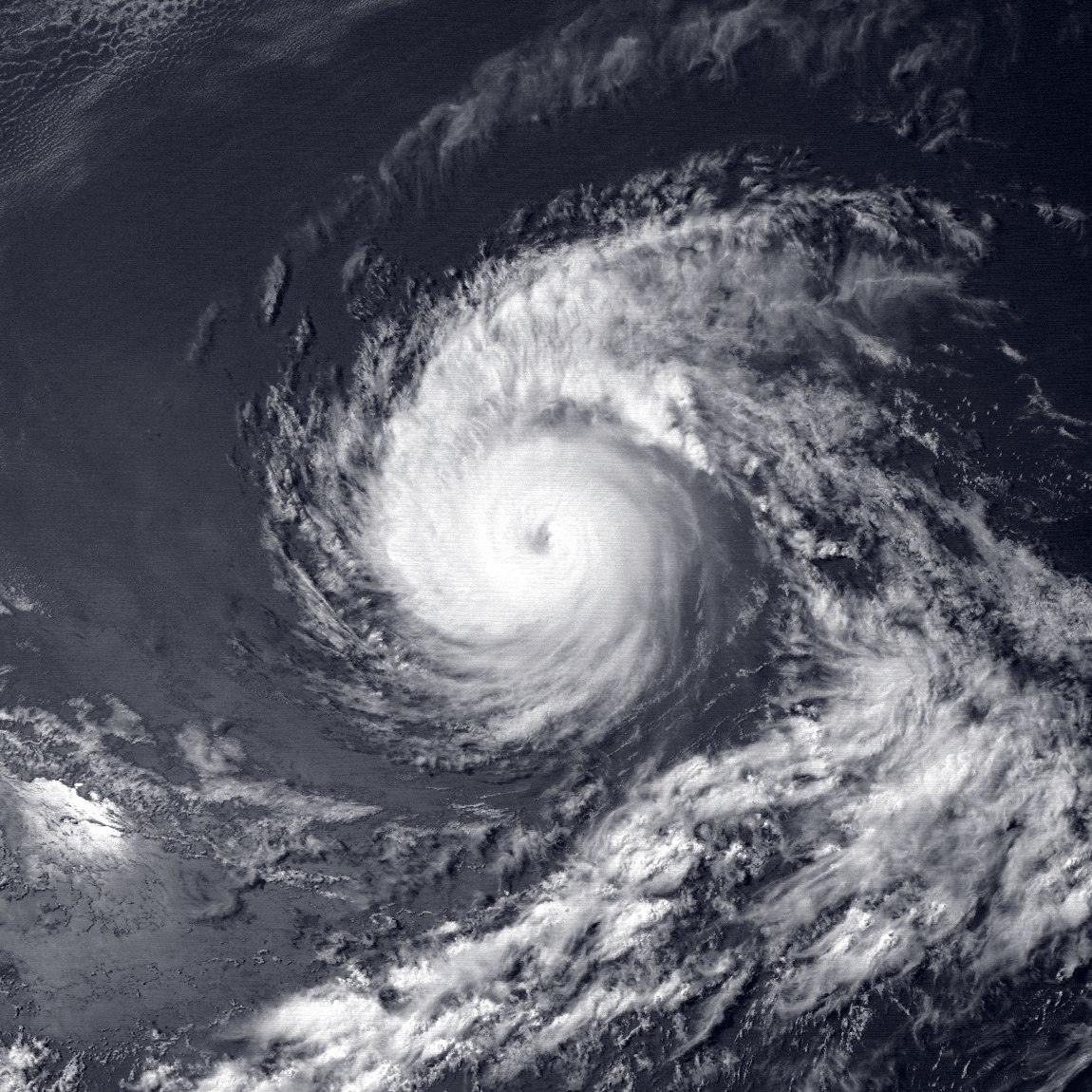
Hurricane Carlos late on June 23

- 00:00 UTC (5:00 p.m. PDT, June 22) at 13.0°N 120.0°W – Hurricane Carlos strengthens to Category 3 intensity about 950 mi (1,530 km) southwest of the southern tip of the Baja California peninsula, making it the first major hurricane of the season.

June 24

- 00:00 UTC (5:00 p.m. PDT, June 23) at 14.9°N 101.8°W – Tropical Depression Four-E strengthens into Tropical Storm Delores about 335 mi (535 km) south-southeast of Manzanillo.
- 06:00 UTC (11:00 p.m. PDT, June 23) at 15.3°N 127.0°W – Hurricane Carlos attains its peak intensity, with maximum sustained winds of 120 mph (195 km/h) and a minimum central pressure of 955 mbar (28.20 inHg), about 1,225 mi (1,970 km) west-southwest of the southern tip of the Baja California peninsula.

June 25

- 06:00 UTC (11:00 p.m. PDT, June 24) at 16.5°N 130.6°W – Hurricane Carlos weakens to Category 2 intensity about 1,410 mi (2,270 km) west-southwest of the southern tip of the Baja California peninsula.
- 06:00 UTC (11:00 p.m. PDT, June 24) at 17.4°N 104.6°W – Tropical Storm Delores strengthens into a Category 1 hurricane about 115 mi (185 km) south of Manzanillo.
- 18:00 UTC (11:00 a.m. PDT) at 16.7°N 131.6°W – Hurricane Carlos weakens to Category 1 intensity about 1,465 mi (2,360 km) west-southwest of the southern tip of the Baja California peninsula.
- 18:00 UTC (11:00 a.m. PDT) at 17.8°N 106.7°W – Hurricane Delores attains its peak intensity, with maximum sustained winds of 85 mph (140 km/h) and a minimum central pressure of 979 mbar (28.91 inHg), about 180 mi (285 km) west-southwest of Manzanillo.

June 26

- 06:00 UTC (11:00 p.m. PDT, June 25) at 16.7°N 132.5°W – Hurricane Carlos weakens into a tropical storm about 1,525 mi (2,455 km) west-southwest of the southern tip of the Baja California peninsula.

June 27

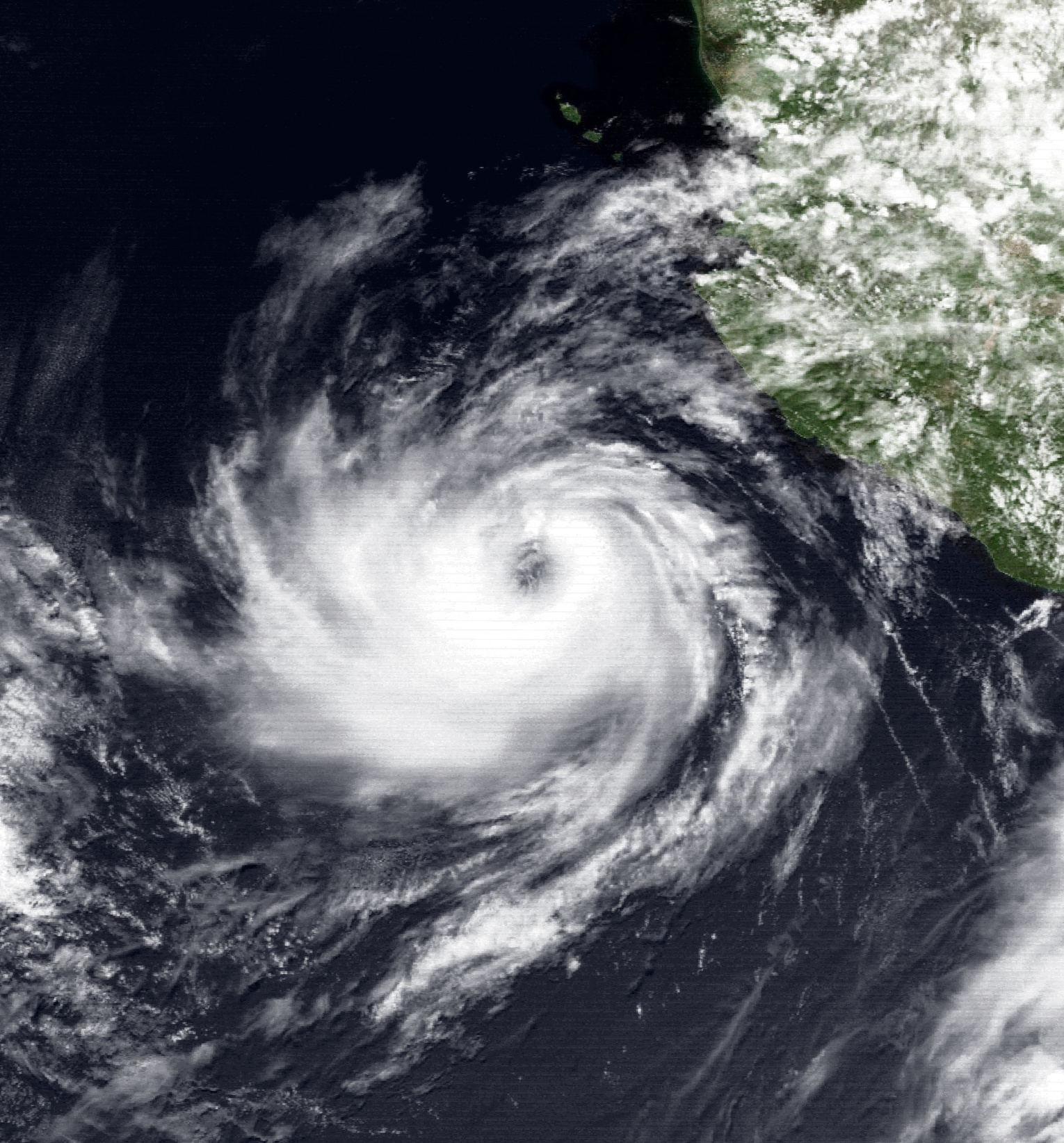
Hurricane Delores at peak intensity late on June 25

- 00:00 UTC (5:00 p.m. PDT, June 26) at 16.8°N 134.4°W – Tropical Storm Carlos weakens into a tropical depression about 1,640 mi (2,640 km) west-southwest of the southern tip of the Baja California peninsula.
- 00:00 UTC (5:00 p.m. PDT, June 26) at 19.6°N 111.4°W – Hurricane Delores weakens into a tropical storm about 65 mi (100 km) north-northwest of Socorro Island.
- 12:00 UTC (5:00 p.m. PDT) at 16.7°N 135.4°W – Tropical Depression Carlos is last noted as a tropical cyclone about 1,705 mi (2,740 km) west-southwest of the southern tip of the Baja California peninsula, dissipating shortly thereafter.

June 28

- 00:00 UTC (5:00 p.m. PDT, June 27) at 18.2°N 111.8°W – Tropical Storm Delores weakens into a tropical depression about 70 mi (110 km) southwest of Socorro Island.
- 12:00 UTC (5:00 a.m. PDT) at 12.7°N 92.9°W – Tropical Depression Five-E forms from an area of unsettled weather about 280 mi (455 km) southeast of Salina Cruz.
- 18:00 UTC (11:00 a.m. PDT) at 18.2°N 111.3°W – Tropical Depression Delores is last noted as a tropical cyclone about 45 mi (75 km) south-southwest of Socorro Island, dissipating shortly thereafter.

June 29

- 12:00 UTC (5:00 a.m. PDT) at 15.4°N 95.0°W – Tropical Depression Five-E attains its peak intensity, with maximum sustained winds of 35 mph (55 km/h) and an unknown central pressure, about 50 mi (85 km) south-southeast of Salina Cruz.
- Exact time and location unknown – Tropical Depression Five-E makes landfall near Salina Cruz at its peak intensity.

June 30

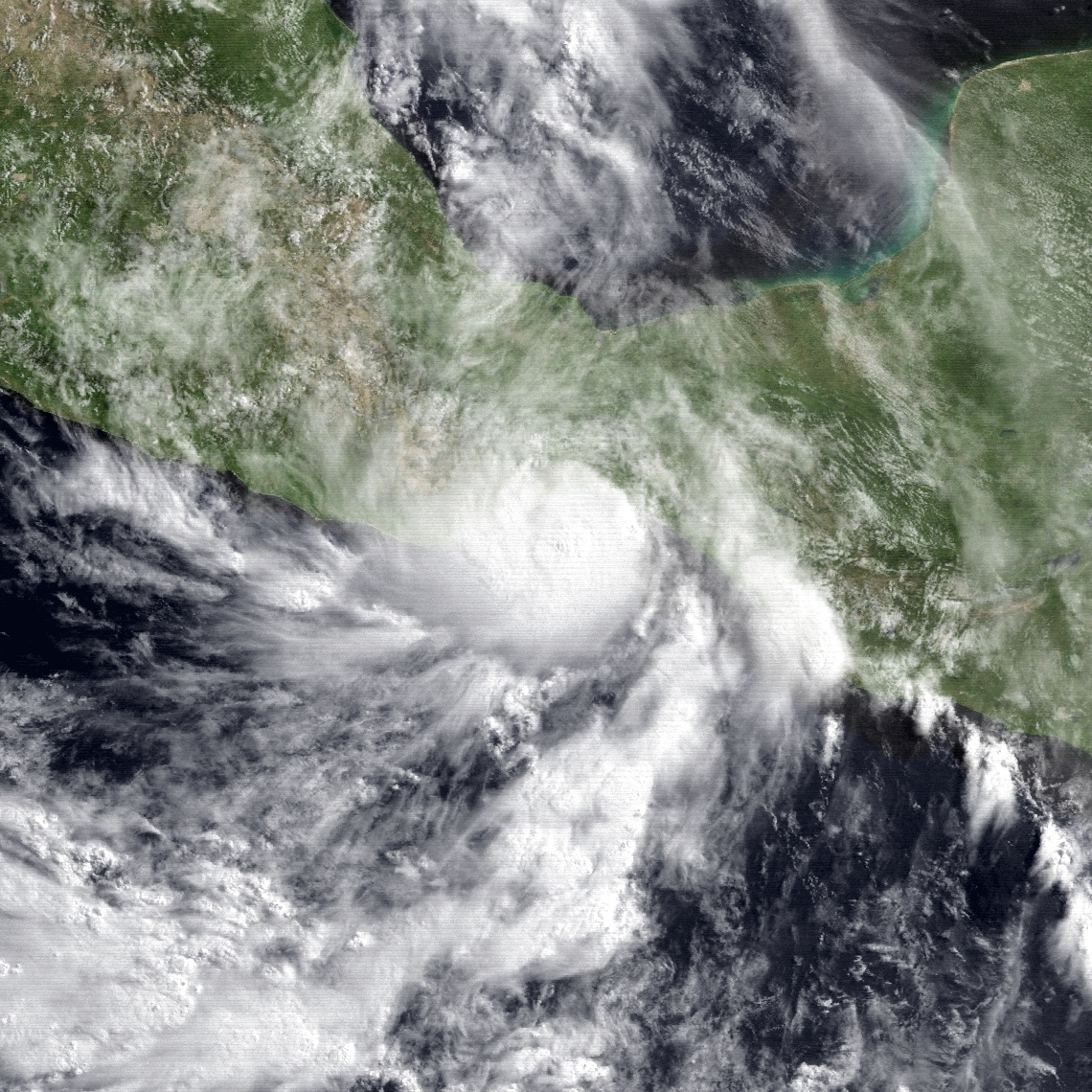
Tropical Depression Five-E near landfall on June 29

- 00:00 UTC (5:00 p.m. PDT, June 29) at 16.3°N 95.8°W – Tropical Depression Five-E is last noted as a tropical depression over land about 40 mi (65 km) west-northwest of Salina Cruz, dissipating shortly thereafter.

=== July ===
July 15

- 12:00 UTC (5:00 a.m. PDT) at 9.4°N 111.9°W – Tropical Depression Six-E forms from a tropical wave about 940 mi (1,510 km) south of the southern tip of the Baja California peninsula.

July 16

- 00:00 UTC (5:00 p.m. PDT, July 15) at 10.2°N 114.8°W – Tropical Depression Six-E strengthens into Tropical Storm Enrique about 930 mi (1,500 km) south-southwest of the southern tip of the Baja California peninsula.

July 17

- 06:00 UTC (11:00 p.m. PDT, July 16) at 12.6°N 121.5°W – Tropical Storm Enrique strengthens into a Category 1 hurricane about 1,035 mi (1,665 km) southwest of the southern tip of the Baja California peninsula. It simultaneously attains its peak intensity, with maximum sustained winds of 75 mph (120 km/h) and a minimum central pressure of 987 mbar (29.15 inHg).
- 12:00 UTC (5:00 a.m. PDT) at 13.0°N 123.1°W – Hurricane Enrique weakens into a tropical storm about 1,100 mi (1,770 km) southwest of the southern tip of the Baja California peninsula.

July 19

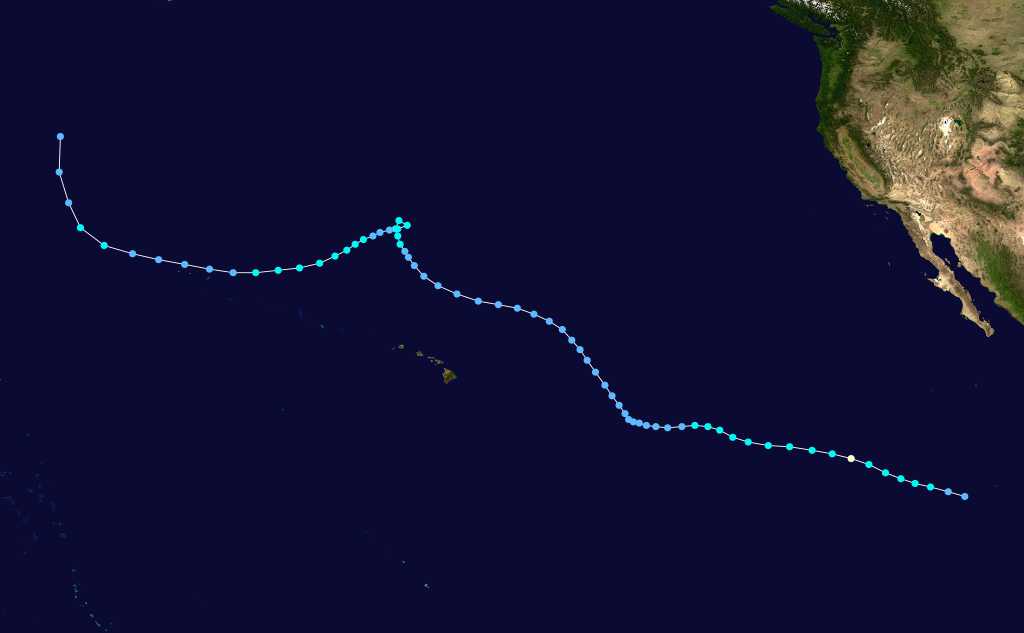
Storm path of Hurricane Enrique

- 18:00 UTC (11:00 a.m. PDT) at 15.3°N 135.9°W – Tropical Storm Enrique weakens into a tropical depression about 1,765 mi (2,845 km) west-southwest of the southern tip of the Baja California peninsula.

July 21

- 12:00 UTC (2:00 a.m. HST) at 16.0°N 140.0°W (Note: The Northeast and North Central Pacific hurricane database (HURDAT) places Enrique at 16.1°N 140.1°W, or about 1,015 mi (1,630 km) east-southeast of Hilo, Hawaii.) – Tropical Depression Enrique crosses 140°W into the Central Pacific basin about 1,025 mi (1,650 km) east-southeast of Hilo, Hawaii.

July 22

- 00:00 UTC (2:00 p.m. HST, July 21) at 16.8°N 140.9°W (Note: HURDAT does not contain a data point for Enrique at 00:00 UTC on July 22 (2:00 p.m. HST on July 21). All information on Enrique's track and intensity after this time is cited to the system's file in the International Best Track Archive for Climate Stewardship (IBTrACS).) The Central Pacific Hurricane Center stops tracking Tropical Depression Enrique about 950 mi (1,530 km) east of Hilo, though it remains a tropical cyclone.

July 26

- 12:00 UTC (2:00 a.m. HST) at 30.8°N 159.6°W – Tropical Depression Enrique restrengthens into a tropical storm about 815 mi (1,315 km) north-northwest of Hilo.

July 28

- 00:00 UTC (2:00 p.m. HST, July 27) at 31.9°N 160.4°W – Tropical Storm Enrique again weakens into a tropical depression about 905 mi (1,455 km) north-northwest of Hilo.
- 18:00 UTC (8:00 a.m. HST) at 31.1°N 163.1°W – Tropical Depression Enrique again restrengthens into a tropical storm about 875 mi (1,410 km) east-northeast of Midway Atoll.

July 29

- 06:00 UTC (11:00 p.m. PDT, July 28) at 10.8°N 107.2°W – Tropical Depression Seven-E forms from a tropical wave about 850 mi (1,370 km) south-southeast of the southern tip of the Baja California peninsula.
- 18:00 UTC (11:00 a.m. PDT) at 12.1°N 109.7°W – Tropical Depression Seven-E strengthens into Tropical Storm Fefa about 740 mi (1,195 km) south of the southern tip of the Baja California peninsula.

July 30

- 18:00 UTC (8:00 a.m. HST) at 28.4°N 174.0°W – Tropical Storm Enrique weakens into a tropical depression for the third time about 200 mi (325 km) east of Midway Atoll.

July 31

- 12:00 UTC (2:00 a.m. HST) at 29.4°N 180.0°E – Tropical Depression Enrique crosses the International Date Line into the Western Pacific basin about 180 mi (285 km) west-northwest of Midway Atoll, thereby becoming part of the annual typhoon season.
- 12:00 UTC (5:00 a.m. PDT) at 15.0°N 116.9°W – Tropical Storm Fefa strengthens into a Category 1 hurricane about 710 mi (1,140 km) southwest of the southern tip of the Baja California peninsula.

=== August ===
August 1

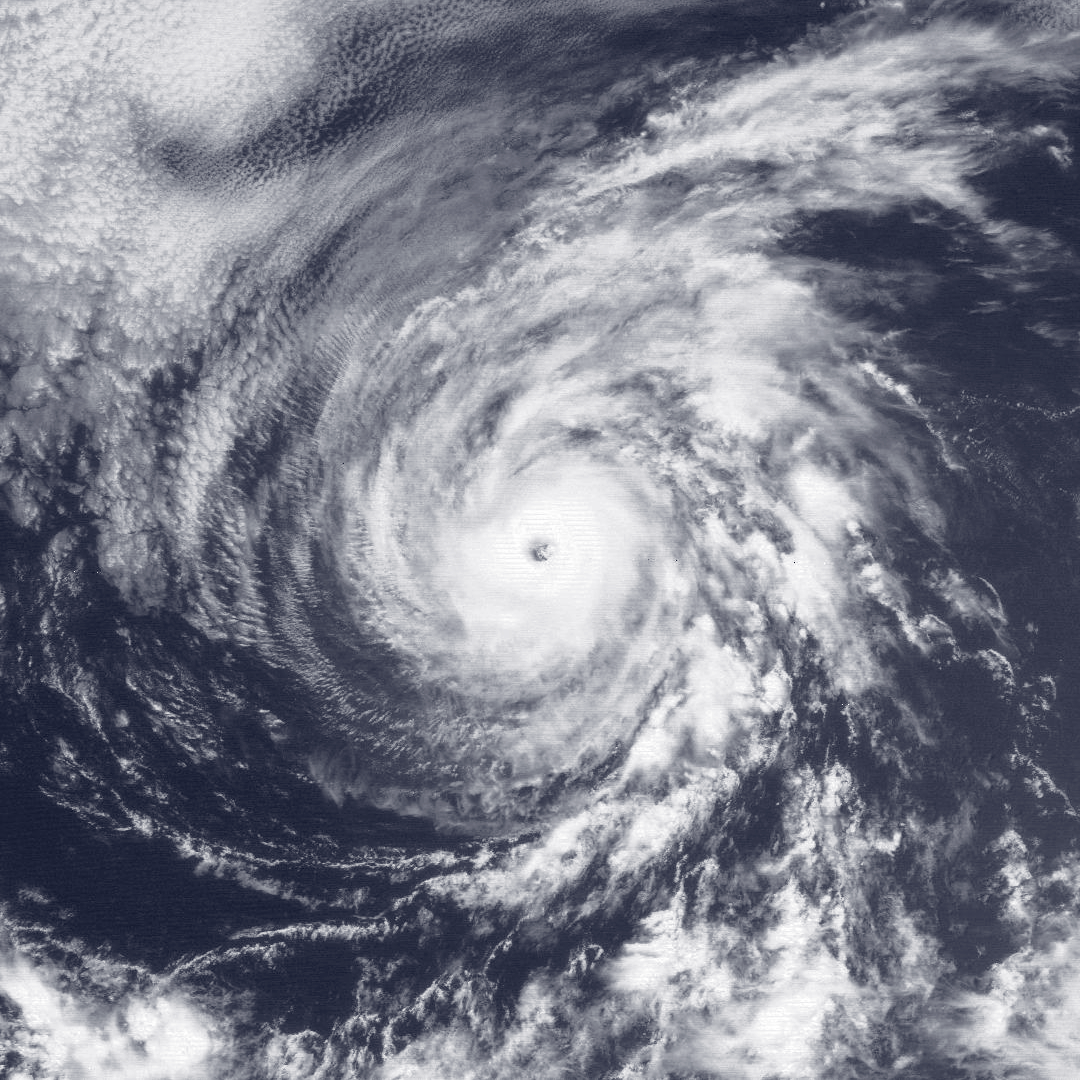
Hurricane Fefa strengthening late on August 1

- 12:00 UTC (5:00 a.m. PDT) at 16.1°N 121.0°W – Hurricane Fefa strengthens to Category 2 intensity about 855 mi (1,380 km) southwest of the southern tip of the Baja California peninsula.

August 2

- 00:00 UTC (5:00 p.m. PDT, August 1) at 16.6°N 122.7°W – Hurricane Fefa strengthens to Category 3 intensity about 930 mi (1,500 km) west-southwest of the southern tip of the Baja California peninsula, making it the second major hurricane of the season. It simultaneously attains its peak intensity, with maximum sustained winds of 120 mph (195 km/h) and a minimum central pressure of 959 mbar (28.32 inHg).
- 18:00 UTC (11:00 a.m. PDT) at 17.3°N 125.7°W – Hurricane Fefa weakens to Category 2 intensity about 1,085 mi (1,750 km) west-southwest of the southern tip of the Baja California peninsula.

August 3

- 06:00 UTC at (11:00 p.m. PDT, August 2) at 17.5°N 128.0°W – Hurricane Fefa weakens to Category 1 intensity about 1,225 mi (1,970 km) west-southwest of the southern tip of the Baja California peninsula.

August 4

- 00:00 UTC (5:00 p.m. PDT, August 3) at 17.8°N 132.5°W – Hurricane Fefa restrengthens to Category 2 intensity about 1,500 mi (2,415 km) west-southwest of the southern tip of the Baja California peninsula.
- 00:00 UTC (5:00 p.m. PDT, August 3) at 12.3°N 98.4°W – Tropical Depression Eight-E forms from a tropical wave about 330 mi (530 km) south-southeast of Acapulco.
- 18:00 UTC (11:00 a.m. PDT) at 13.8°N 101.1°W – Tropical Depression Eight-E strengthens into Tropical Storm Guillermo about 225 mi (360 km) south-southwest of Acapulco.

August 5

- 06:00 UTC (8:00 p.m. HST, August 4) at 18.1°N 140.3°W – Hurricane Fefa crosses 140°W into the Central Pacific basin about 970 mi (1,565 km) east of Hilo.
- 12:00 UTC (2:00 a.m. HST) at 18.1°N 142.0°W – Hurricane Fefa again weakens to Category 1 intensity about 865 mi (1,390 km) east of Hilo.
- 12:00 UTC (5:00 a.m. PDT) at 15.2°N 103.7°W – Tropical Storm Guillermo strengthens into a Category 1 hurricane about 270 mi (435 km) south of Manzanillo.

August 6

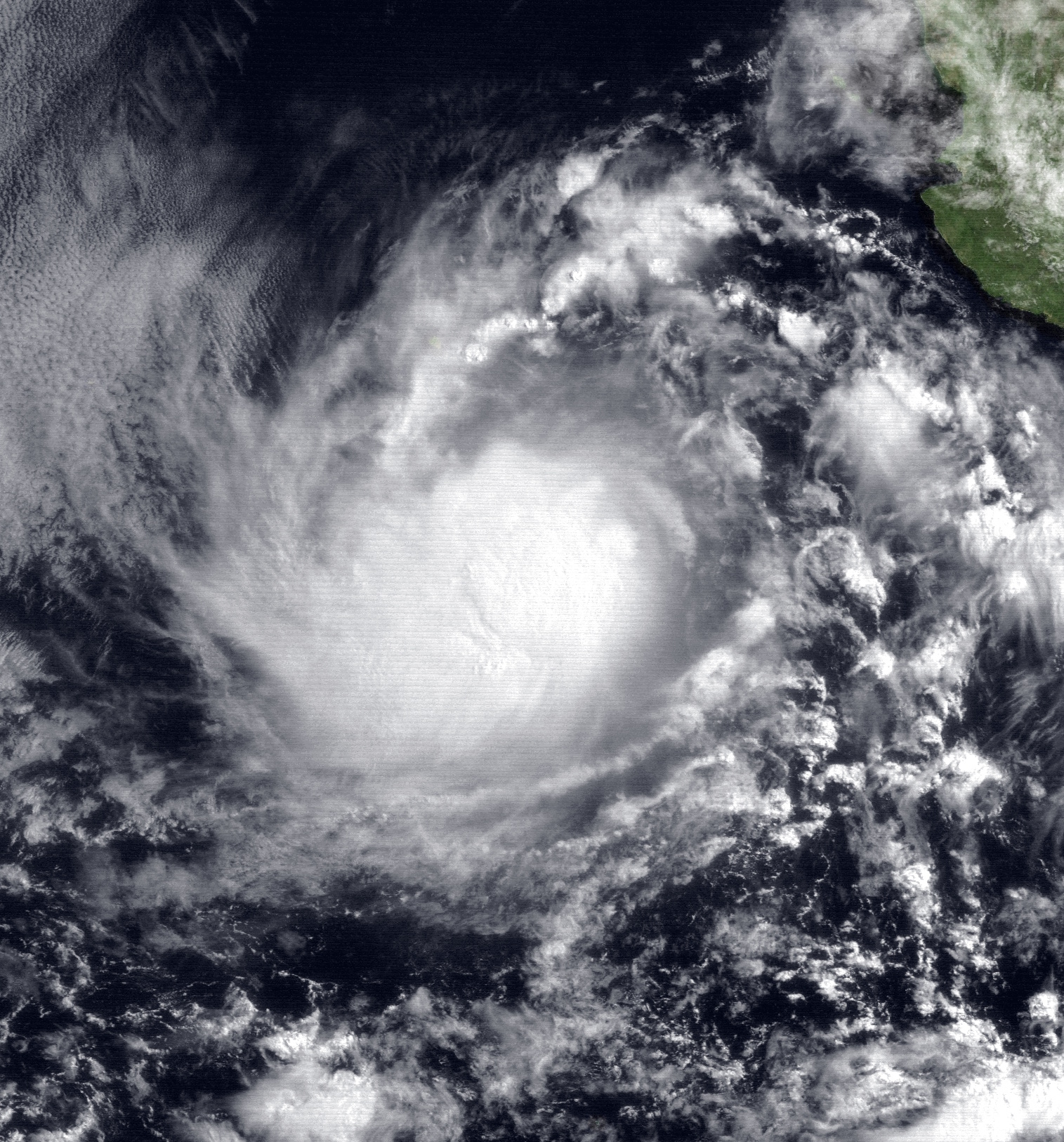
Hurricane Guillermo at peak intensity on August 6

- 06:00 UTC (11:00 p.m. PDT, August 5) at 16.7°N 107.7°W – Hurricane Guillermo attains its peak intensity, with maximum sustained winds of 80 mph (130 km/h) and a minimum central pressure of 983 mbar (29.03 inHg), about 275 mi (445 km) southwest of Manzanillo.
- 12:00 UTC (2:00 a.m. HST) at 18.4°N 147.0°W (Note: HURDAT places Fefa at 18.3°N 147.0°W, or about 535 mi (860 km) east of Hilo.) – Hurricane Fefa weakens into a tropical storm about 535 mi (860 km) east of Hilo. (Note: According to HURDAT, Fefa weakened into a tropical storm at 06:00 UTC on August 6 (8:00 p.m. HST on August 5) at 18.3°N 145.9°W, or about 610 mi (980 km) east of Hilo.)

August 7

- 12:00 UTC (5:00 a.m. PDT) at 17.0°N 114.0°W – Hurricane Guillermo weakens into a tropical storm about 485 mi (780 km) southwest of the southern tip of the Baja California peninsula.
- 18:00 UTC (8:00 a.m. HST) at 18.6°N 153.8°W (Note: HURDAT places Fefa at 18.8°N 154.1°W, or about 90 mi (150 km) southeast of Hilo.) – Tropical Storm Fefa weakens into a tropical depression about 115 mi (185 km) southeast of Hilo.

August 8

- 00:00 UTC (2:00 p.m. HST, August 7) at 18.7°N 154.6°W (Note: HURDAT places Fefa at 19.3°N 155.0°W, or about 30 mi (45 km) south of Hilo.) – Tropical Depression Fefa is last noted as a tropical cyclone about 75 mph (120 km/h) south-southeast of Hilo, dissipating near or over the island of Hawaiʻi shortly thereafter.
- 00:00 UTC (5:00 p.m. PDT, August 7) at 13.3°N 101.9°W – Tropical Depression Nine-E forms from a tropical wave about 280 mi (455 km) south-southwest of Acapulco.

August 9

- 12:00 UTC (5:00 a.m. PDT) at 17.3°N 125.3°W – Tropical Storm Guillermo weakens into a tropical depression about 1,065 mi (1,715 km) west-southwest of the southern tip of the Baja California peninsula.
- 12:00 UTC (5:00 a.m. PDT) at 15.1°N 107.8°W – Tropical Depression Nine-E strengthens into Tropical Storm Hilda about 550 mi (890 km) south-southeast of the southern tip of the Baja California peninsula.

August 10

- 18:00 UTC (11:00 a.m. PDT) at 15.2°N 133.6°W – Tropical Depression Guillermo is last noted as a tropical cyclone about 1,630 mi (2,620 km) west-southwest of the southern tip of the Baja California peninsula, dissipating shortly thereafter.

August 11

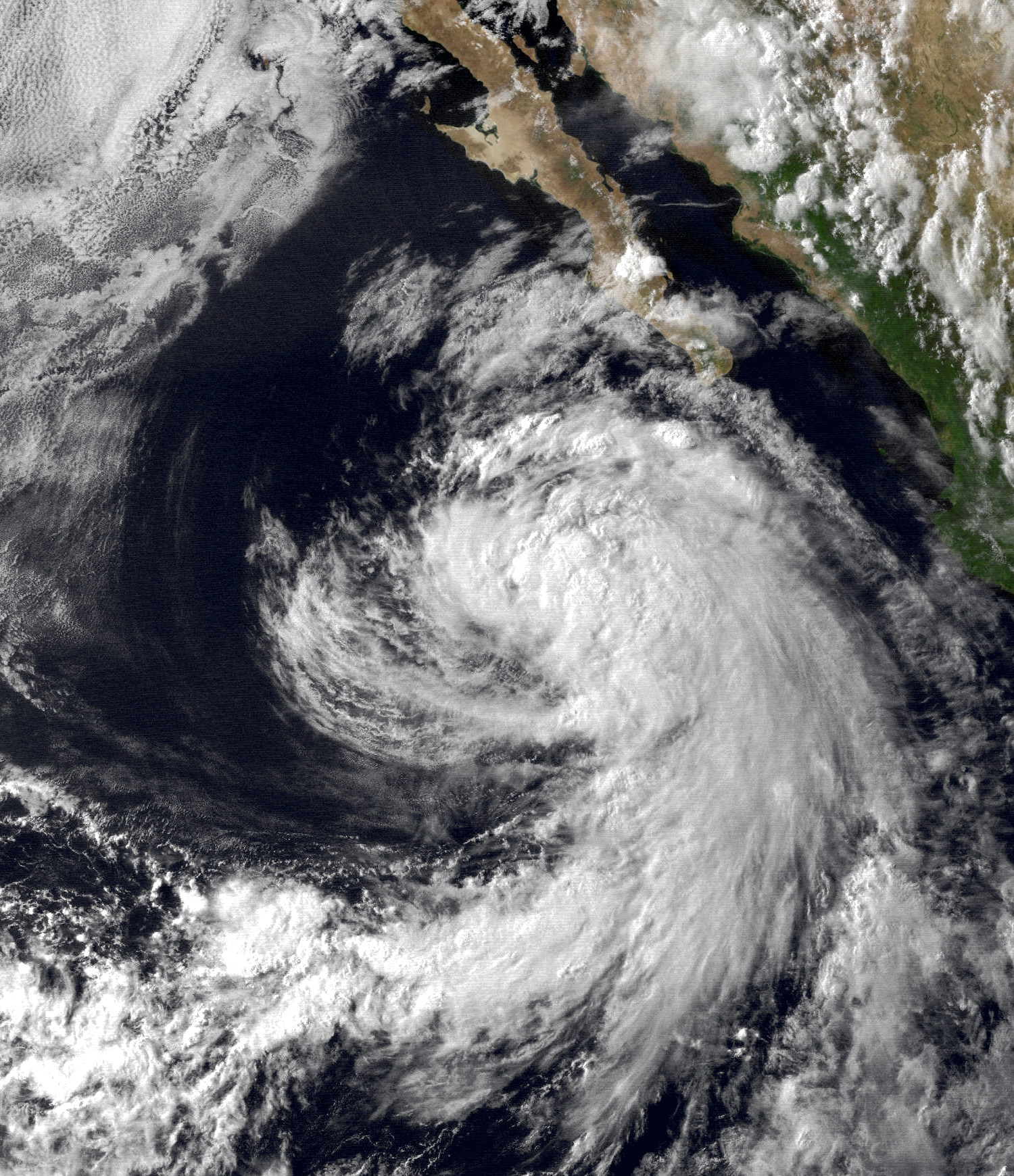
Tropical Storm Hilda near peak intensity early on August 11

- 06:00 UTC (11:00 p.m. PDT, August 10) at 20.0°N 114.3°W – Tropical Storm Hilda attains its peak intensity, with maximum sustained winds of 65 mph (100 km/h) and a minimum central pressure of 992 mbar (29.29 inHg), about 340 mi (545 km) southwest of the southern tip of the Baja California peninsula.

August 13

- 00:00 UTC (5:00 p.m. PDT, August 12) at 28.8°N 120.9°W – Tropical Storm Hilda weakens into a tropical depression about 160 mi (260 km) west of Guadalupe Island.

August 14

- 06:00 UTC (11:00 p.m. PDT, August 13) at 32.7°N 121.6°W – Tropical Depression Hilda is last noted as a tropical cyclone about 320 mi (520 km) northwest of Guadalupe Island, off the coast of Southern California, dissipating shortly thereafter.

=== September ===
September 12

- 12:00 UTC (5:00 a.m. PDT) at 17.0°N 106.7°W – Tropical Depression Ten-E forms from an area of unsettled weather about 215 mi (345 km) southwest of Manzanillo.

September 13

- 06:00 UTC (11:00 p.m. PDT, September 12) at 18.8°N 107.2°W – Tropical Depression Ten-E attains its peak intensity, with maximum sustained winds of 35 mph (55 km/h) and an unknown central pressure, about 190 mi (305 km) west of Manzanillo.

September 14

- 00:00 UTC (5:00 p.m. PDT, September 13) at 20.3°N 106.9°W – Tropical Depression Ten-E is last noted as a tropical cyclone about 190 mi (305 km) west-northwest of Manzanillo, dissipating shortly thereafter.

September 16

- 06:00 UTC (11:00 p.m. PDT, September 15) at 14.1°N 102.2°W – Tropical Depression Eleven-E forms from an area of unsettled weather about 245 mi (400 km) southwest of Acapulco.
- 18:00 UTC (11:00 a.m. PDT) at 16.0°N 102.5°W – Tropical Depression Eleven-E strengthens into Tropical Storm Ignacio about 185 mi (295 km) west-southwest of Acapulco.

September 17

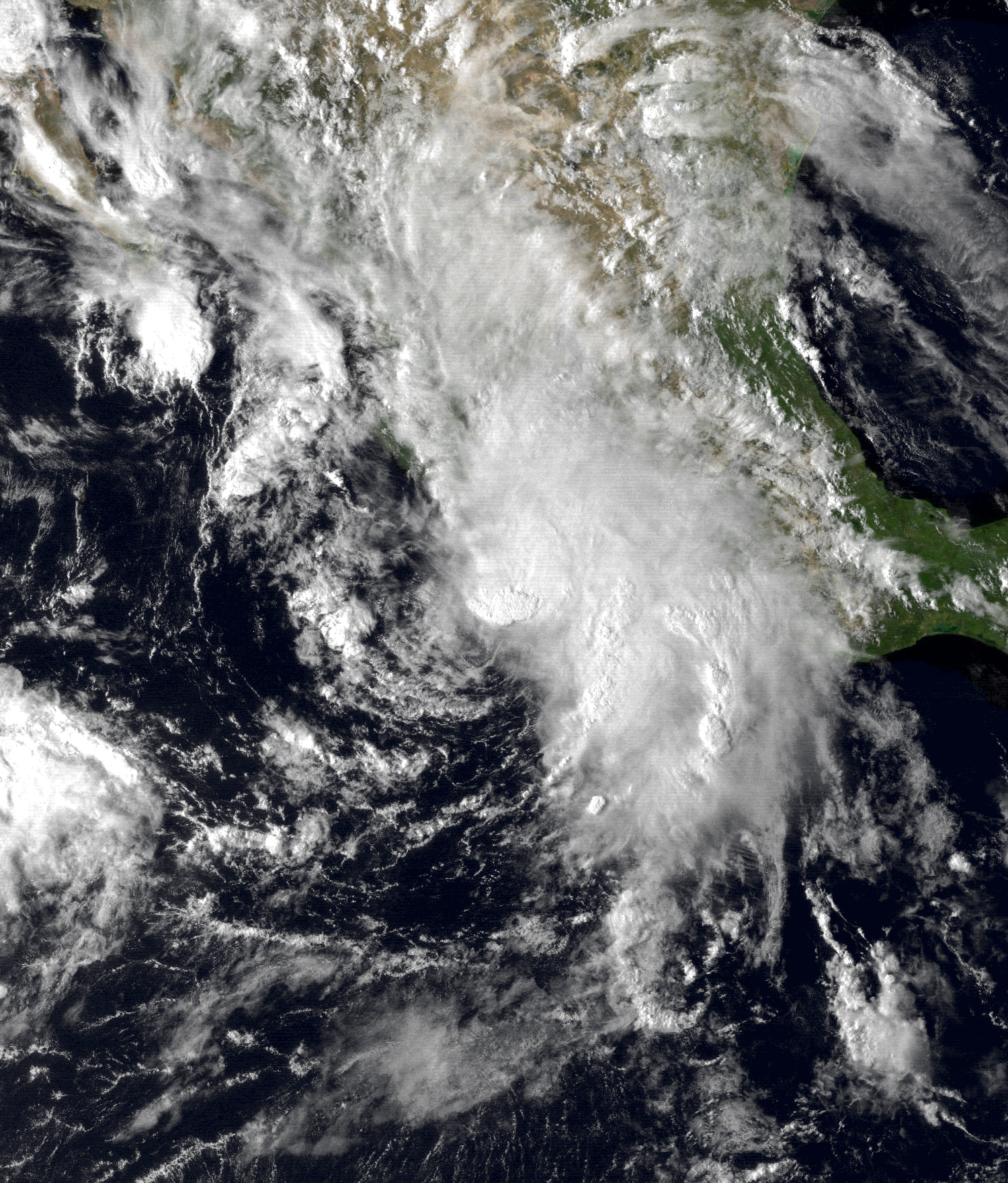
Tropical Storm Ignacio strengthening late on September 16

- 12:00 UTC (5:00 a.m. PDT) at 17.5°N 103.5°W – Tropical Storm Ignacio attains its peak intensity, with maximum sustained winds of 65 mph (100 km/h) and a minimum central pressure of 994 mbar (29.35 inHg), about 240 mi (390 km) west of Acapulco.

September 19

- 00:00 UTC (5:00 p.m. PDT, September 18) at 16.4°N 102.7°W – Tropical Storm Ignacio weakens into a tropical depression about 190 mi (305 km) west of Acapulco.
- 06:00 UTC (11:00 p.m. PDT, September 18) at 16.1°N 102.8°W – Tropical Depression Ignacio dissipates about 200 mi (325 km) west-southwest of Acapulco. (Note: HURDAT maintains Ignacio as a tropical depression at 06:00 UTC on September 19 (11:00 p.m. PDT on September 18), terminating it afterwards.)

September 20

- 18:00 UTC (11:00 a.m. PDT) at 10.1°N 100.1°W – Tropical Depression Twelve-E forms from a tropical wave about 465 mi (750 km) south of Acapulco.

September 21

- 18:00 UTC (11:00 a.m. PDT) at 11.7°N 103.0°W – Tropical Depression Twelve-E strengthens into Tropical Storm Jimena about 415 mi (665 km) south-southwest of Acapulco.

September 22

- 18:00 UTC (11:00 a.m. PDT) at 13.4°N 104.9°W – Tropical Storm Jimena strengthens into a Category 1 hurricane about 410 mi (655 km) southwest of Acapulco.

September 23

- 00:00 UTC (5:00 p.m. PDT, September 22) at 13.4°N 105.7°W – Hurricane Jimena strengthens to Category 2 intensity about 455 mi (730 km) west-southwest of Acapulco.
- 06:00 UTC (11:00 p.m. PDT, September 22) at 13.5°N 106.6°W – Hurricane Jimena strengthens to Category 3 intensity about 505 mi (815 km) west-southwest of Acapulco, making it the third major hurricane of the season.
- 18:00 UTC (11:00 a.m. PDT) at 13.4°N 108.9°W – Hurricane Jimena strengthens to Category 4 intensity about 645 mi (1,035 km) west-southwest of Acapulco, or about 655 mi (1,055 km) south of the southern tip of the Baja California peninsula.

September 24

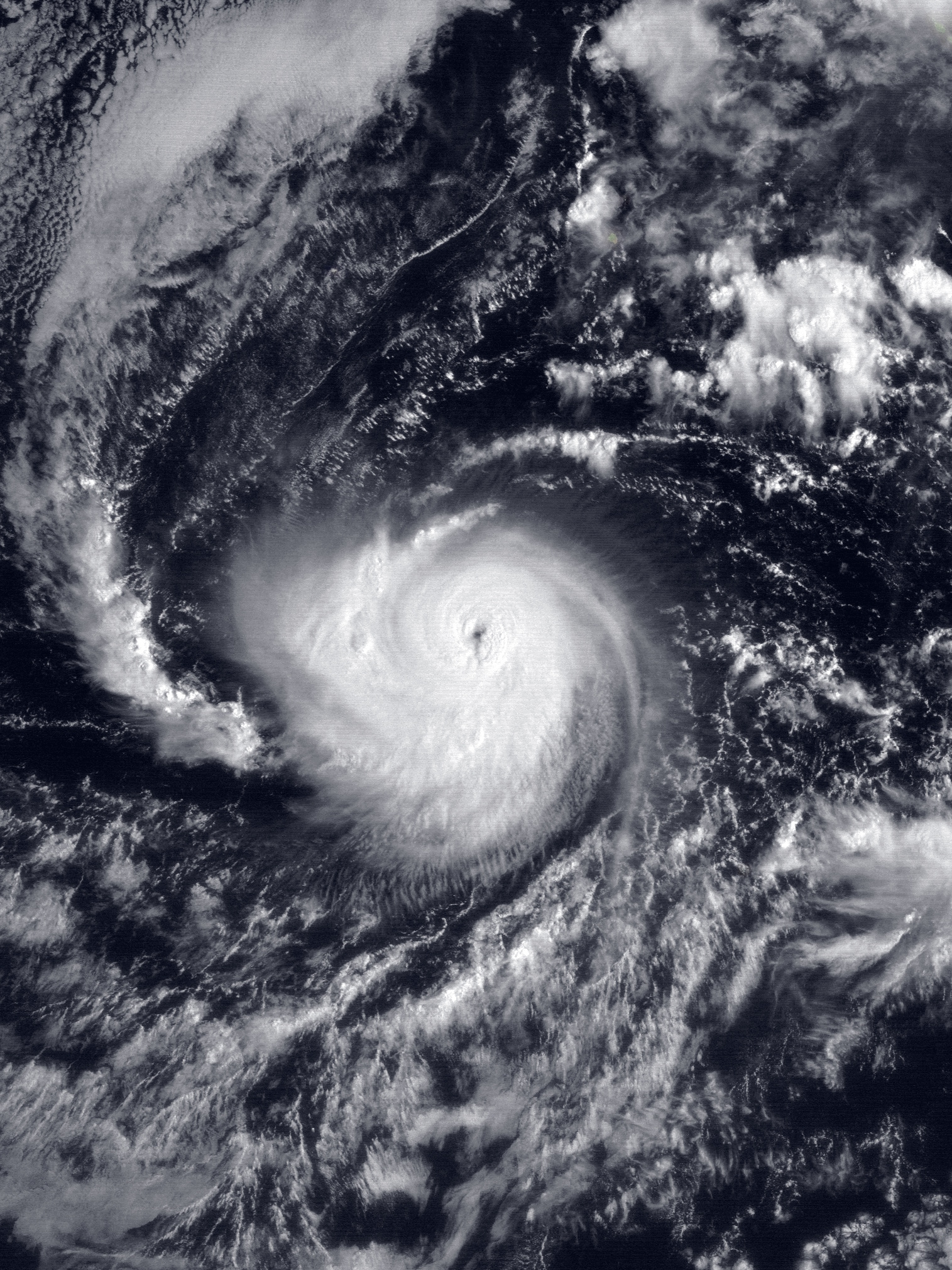
Hurricane Jimena at peak intensity on September 24

- 12:00 UTC (5:00 a.m. PDT) at 13.4°N 112.1°W – Hurricane Jimena attains its peak intensity, with maximum sustained winds of 130 mph (215 km/h) and a minimum central pressure of 945 mbar (27.91 inHg), about 665 mi (1,075 km) south of the southern tip of the Baja California peninsula.

September 25

- 00:00 UTC (5:00 p.m. PDT, September 24) at 13.3°N 114.1°W – Hurricane Jimena weakens to Category 3 intensity about 715 mi (1,150 km) south-southwest of the southern tip of the Baja California peninsula.
- 00:00 UTC (5:00 p.m. PDT, September 24) at 12.2°N 96.2°W – Tropical Depression Thirteen-E forms from a tropical wave about 405 mi (650 km) southeast of Acapulco.
- 12:00 UTC (5:00 a.m. PDT) at 13.4°N 116.0°W – Hurricane Jimena restrengthens to Category 4 intensity about 765 mi (1,230 km) south-southwest of the southern tip of the Baja California peninsula.
- 18:00 UTC (11:00 a.m. PDT) at 12.4°N 98.3°W – Tropical Depression Thirteen-E strengthens into Tropical Storm Kevin about 330 mi (530 km) south-southeast of Acapulco.

September 26

- 06:00 UTC (11:00 p.m. PDT, September 25) at 13.9°N 118.4°W – Hurricane Jimena again weakens to Category 3 intensity about 765 mi (1,230 km) southwest of the southern tip of the Baja California peninsula.
- 18:00 UTC (11:00 a.m. PDT) at 13.5°N 100.6°W – Tropical Storm Kevin strengthens into a Category 1 hurricane about 235 mi (380 km) south of Acapulco.

September 27

- 06:00 UTC (11:00 p.m. PDT, September 26) at 13.7°N 101.7°W – Hurricane Kevin strengthens to Category 2 intensity about 245 mi (400 km) south-southwest of Acapulco.
- 18:00 UTC (11:00 a.m. PDT) at 15.5°N 122.5°W – Hurricane Jimena weakens to Category 2 intensity about 960 mi (1,545 km) west-southwest of the southern tip of the Baja California peninsula.

September 29

- 00:00 UTC (5:00 p.m. PDT, September 28) at 15.5°N 104.9°W – Hurricane Kevin strengthens to Category 3 intensity about 345 mi (555 km) west-southwest of Acapulco, making it the fourth major hurricane of the season.
- 18:00 UTC (11:00 a.m. PDT) at 16.5°N 106.7°W – Hurricane Kevin strengthens to Category 4 intensity about 450 mi (720 km) west of Acapulco, or about 490 mi (785 km) south-southeast of the southern tip of the Baja California peninsula.

September 30

- 00:00 UTC (5:00 p.m. PDT, September 29) at 17.2°N 125.5°W – Hurricane Jimena weakens to Category 1 intensity about 1,080 mi (1,740 km) west-southwest of the southern tip of the Baja California peninsula.
- 12:00 UTC (5:00 a.m. PDT) at 18.5°N 126.5°W – Hurricane Jimena weakens into a tropical storm about 1,110 mi (1,785 km) west-southwest of the southern tip of the Baja California peninsula.

=== October ===
October 1

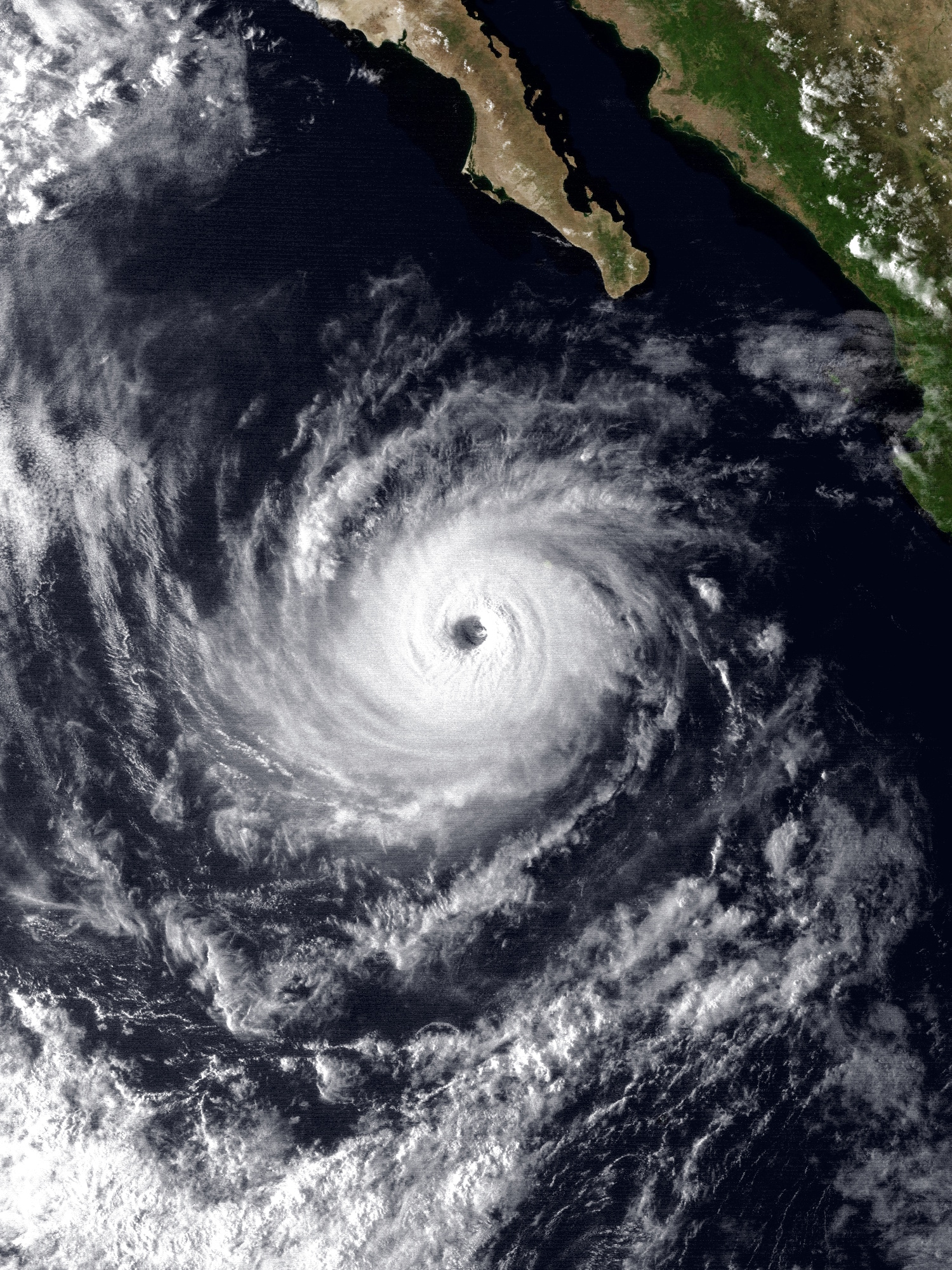
Hurricane Kevin at peak intensity early on October 1

- 00:00 UTC (5:00 p.m. PDT, September 30) at 17.6°N 112.0°W – Hurricane Kevin attains its peak intensity, with maximum sustained winds of 145 mph (230 km/h) and a minimum central pressure of 935 mbar (27.61 inHg), about 385 mi (620 km) south-southwest of the southern tip of the Baja California peninsula, making it the strongest storm of the season.
- 06:00 UTC (11:00 p.m. PDT, September 30) at 20.5°N 129.1°W – Tropical Storm Jimena weakens into a tropical depression about 1,235 mi (1,990 km) west of the southern tip of the Baja California peninsula.

October 2

- 00:00 UTC (5:00 p.m. PDT, October 1) at 22.5°N 131.5°W – Tropical Depression Jimena is last noted as a tropical cyclone about 1,370 mi (2,205 km) west of the southern tip of the Baja California peninsula, dissipating shortly thereafter.
- 18:00 UTC (11:00 a.m. PDT) at 17.2°N 119.2°W – Hurricane Kevin weakens to Category 3 intensity about 715 mi (1,150 km) southwest of the southern tip of the Baja California peninsula.

October 3

- 12:00 UTC (5:00 a.m. PDT) at 13.4°N 108.7°W – Tropical Depression Fourteen-E forms from a tropical wave about 405 mi (650 km) south-southeast of Socorro Island.

October 4

- 00:00 UTC (5:00 p.m. PDT, October 3) at 14.9°N 124.3°W – Hurricane Kevin weakens to Category 2 intensity about 1,085 mi (1,750 km) west-southwest of the southern tip of the Baja California peninsula.
- 00:00 UTC (5:00 p.m. PDT, October 3) at 14.4°N 109.2°W – Tropical Depression Fourteen-E strengthens into Tropical Storm Linda about 320 mi (520 km) south-southeast of Socorro Island.

October 5

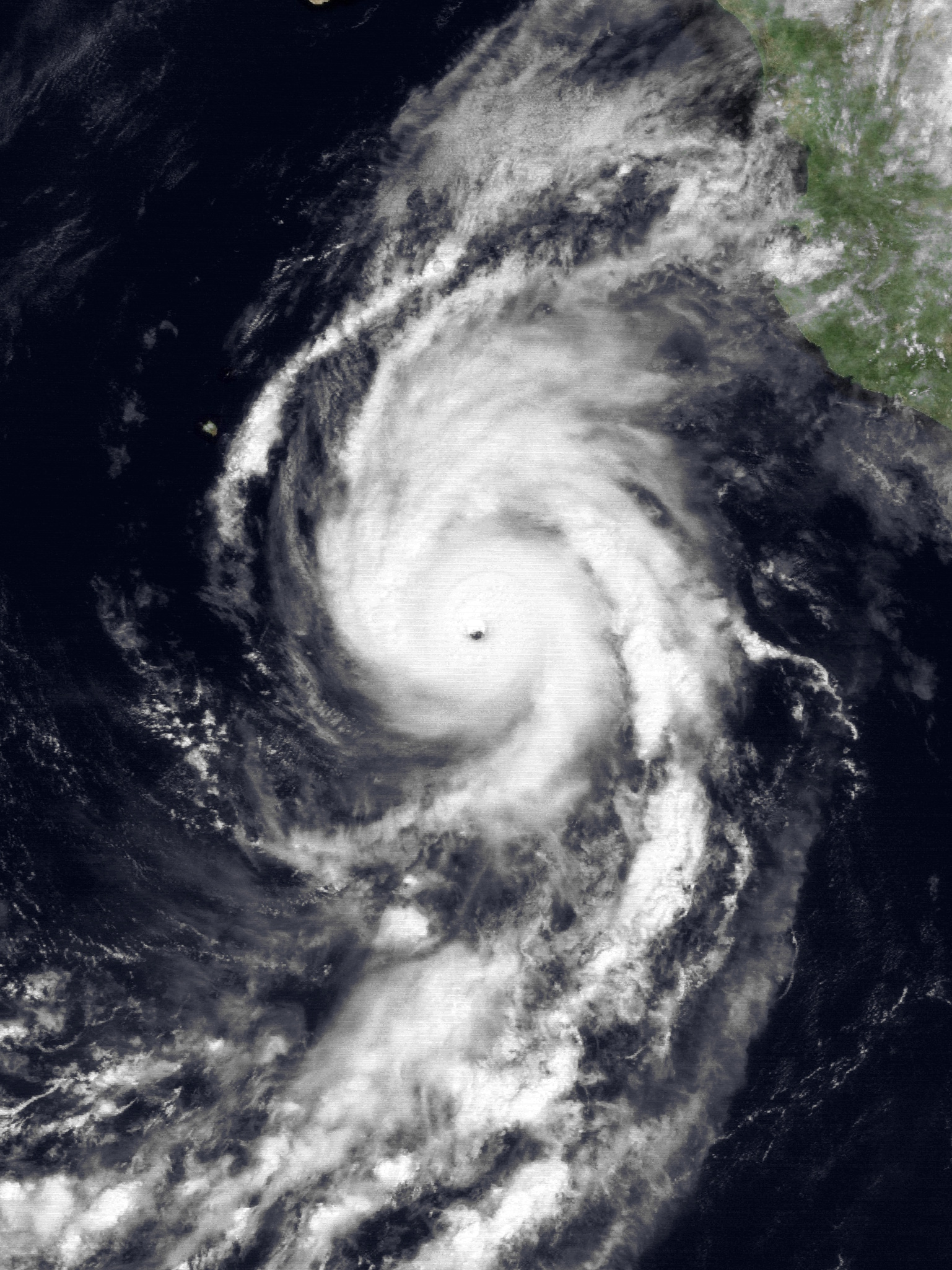
Hurricane Linda at peak intensity late on October 5

- 00:00 UTC (5:00 p.m. PDT, October 4) at 15.8°N 109.0°W – Tropical Storm Linda strengthens into a Category 1 hurricane about 240 mi (390 km) south-southeast of Socorro Island.
- 06:00 UTC (11:00 p.m. PDT, October 4) at 14.9°N 129.9°W – Hurricane Kevin weakens to Category 1 intensity about 1,410 mi (2,270 km) west-southwest of the southern tip of the Baja California peninsula.
- 06:00 UTC (11:00 p.m. PDT, October 4) at 16.1°N 108.8°W – Hurricane Linda strengthens to Category 2 intensity about 235 mi (380 km) southeast of Socorro Island.
- 12:00 UTC (5:00 a.m. PDT) at 16.4°N 108.7°W – Hurricane Linda strengthens to Category 3 intensity about 225 mi (360 km) southeast of Socorro Island, making it the fifth and final major hurricane of the season.
- 18:00 UTC (11:00 a.m. PDT) at 16.7°N 108.6°W – Hurricane Linda attains its peak intensity, with maximum sustained winds of 120 mph (195 km/h) and a minimum central pressure of 957 mbar (28.26 inHg), about 215 mi (345 km) southeast of Socorro Island.

October 6

- 06:00 UTC (11:00 p.m. PDT, October 5) at 17.7°N 108.6°W – Hurricane Linda weakens to Category 2 intensity about 175 mi (280 km) east-southeast of Socorro Island.
- 12:00 UTC (5:00 a.m. PDT) at 16.0°N 133.5°W – Hurricane Kevin restrengthens to Category 2 intensity about 1,600 mi (2,575 km) west-southwest of the southern tip of the Baja California peninsula.
- 18:00 UTC (11:00 a.m. PDT) at 18.5°N 109.5°W – Hurricane Linda weakens to Category 1 intensity about 100 mi (155 km) east of Socorro Island.

October 7

- 12:00 UTC (5:00 a.m. PDT) at 17.4°N 134.9°W – Hurricane Kevin restrengthens to Category 3 intensity about 1,655 mi (2,665 km) west-southwest of the southern tip of the Baja California peninsula.
- 12:00 UTC (5:00 a.m. PDT) at 19.3°N 111.9°W – Hurricane Linda weakens into a tropical storm about 70 mi (110 km) west-northwest of Socorro Island.
- 12:00 UTC (5:00 a.m. PDT) at 12.2°N 95.3°W – Tropical Depression Fifteen-E forms from a tropical wave about 445 mi (715 km) southeast of Acapulco.

October 8

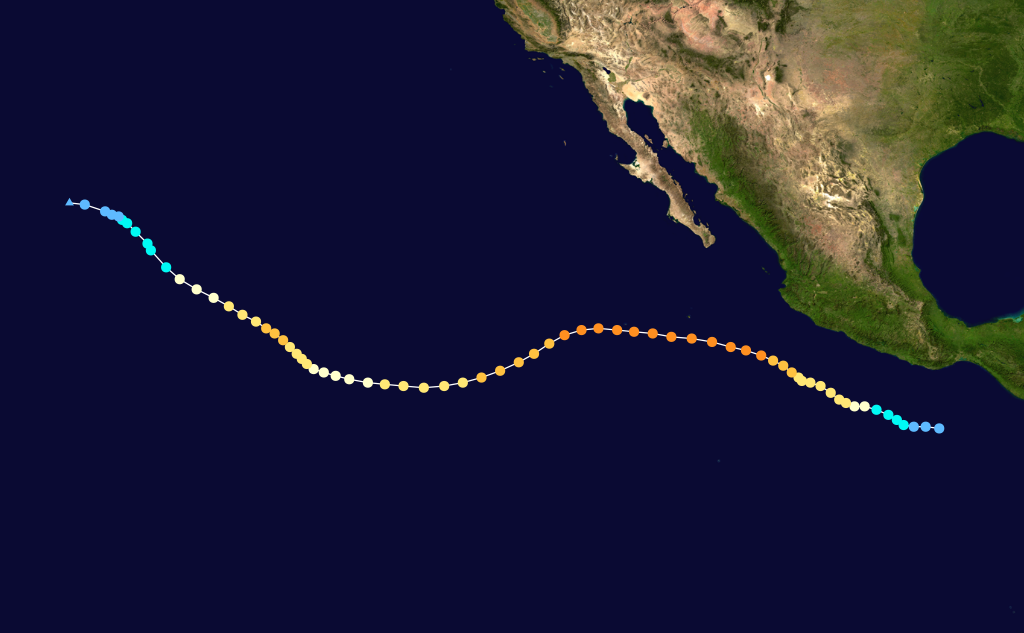
Storm path of Hurricane Kevin

- 06:00 UTC (11:00 p.m. PDT, October 7) at 18.5°N 136.5°W – Hurricane Kevin again weakens to Category 2 intensity about 1,740 mi (2,795 km) west of the southern tip of the Baja California peninsula.
- 18:00 UTC (11:00 a.m. PDT) at 14.3°N 99.1°W – Tropical Depression Fifteen-E strengthens into Tropical Storm Marty about 185 mi (295 km) south-southeast of Acapulco.

October 9

- 00:00 UTC (5:00 p.m. PDT, October 8) at 19.9°N 139.0°W – Hurricane Kevin again weakens to Category 1 intensity about 1,875 mi (3,020 km) west of the southern tip of the Baja California peninsula.
- 12:00 UTC (2:00 a.m. HST) at 21.0°N 141.0°W – Hurricane Kevin crosses 140°W into the Central Pacific basin about 915 mi (1,470 km) east of Hilo. (Note: HURDAT assesses Kevin as crossing 140°W six hours earlier. At 06:00 UTC on October 9 (8:00 p.m. HST on October 8), HURDAT places Kevin at 20.4°N 140.0°W—just inside the Central Pacific Hurricane Center's area of responsibility—or about 980 mi (1,575 km) east of Hilo.)
- 18:00 UTC (8:00 a.m. HST) at 21.7°N 142.0°W (Note: HURDAT places Kevin at 21.7°N 141.8°W, or about 870 mi (1,400 km) east of Hilo.) – Hurricane Kevin weakens into a tropical storm about 855 mi (1,380 km) east of Hilo.

October 10

- 00:00 UTC (5:00 p.m. PDT, October 9) at 20.1°N 120.4°W – Tropical Storm Linda weakens into a tropical depression about 620 mi (1,000 km) west of Socorro Island.
- 06:00 UTC (11:00 p.m. PDT, October 9) at 16.3°N 104.6°W – Tropical Storm Marty strengthens into a Category 1 hurricane about 190 mi (305 km) south of Manzanillo.

October 11

- 06:00 UTC (8:00 p.m. HST, October 10) at 24.6°N 144.6°W (Note: HURDAT places Kevin at 24.7°N 144.6°W, or about 755 mi (1,215 km) east-northeast of Hilo.) – Tropical Storm Kevin weakens into a tropical depression about 750 mi (1,205 km) east-northeast of Hilo.
- 18:00 UTC (11:00 a.m. PDT) at 17.4°N 108.6°W – Hurricane Marty attains its peak intensity, with maximum sustained winds of 80 mph (130 km/h) and a minimum central pressure of 979 mbar (28.91 inHg), about 305 mi (490 km) west-southwest of Manzanillo.

October 12

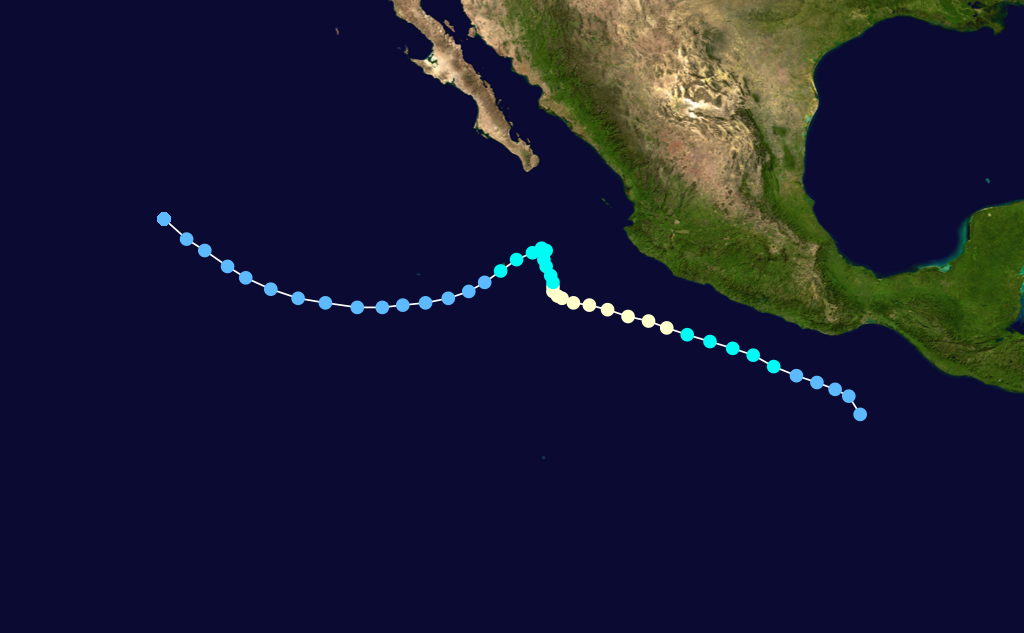
Storm path of Hurricane Marty

- 00:00 UTC (2:00 p.m. HST, October 11) at 25.4°N 146.6°W – Tropical Depression Kevin is last noted as a tropical cyclone about 665 mi (1,075 km) northeast of Hilo, either transitioning into an extratropical cyclone or outright dissipating shortly thereafter.
- 18:00 UTC (11:00 a.m. PDT) at 18.3°N 108.9°W – Hurricane Marty weakens into a tropical storm about 305 mi (490 km) west of Manzanillo.

October 13

- 18:00 UTC (11:00 a.m. PDT) at 18.5°N 130.0°W – Tropical Depression Linda is last noted as a tropical cyclone about 1,245 mi (2,000 km) west of Socorro Island, dissipating shortly thereafter.

October 15

- 06:00 UTC (11:00 p.m. PDT, October 14) at 17.6°N 112.5°W – Tropical Storm Marty weakens into a tropical depression about 395 mi (640 km) south-southwest of the southern tip of the Baja California peninsula.

October 18

- 18:00 UTC (11:00 a.m. PDT) at 22.0°N 126.8°W – Tropical Depression Marty dissipates about 1,075 mi (1,730 km) west of the southern tip of the Baja California peninsula.

=== November ===
November 7

- 00:00 UTC (4:00 p.m. PST, (Note: Daylight saving time ended on October 27, 1991. At 2:00 a.m. PDT, clocks were moved back to 1:00 a.m. PST.) November 6) at 10.1°N 104.4°W – Tropical Depression Sixteen-E forms from a tropical wave about 560 mi (900 km) southwest of Acapulco.
- 12:00 UTC (4:00 a.m. PST) at 11.0°N 106.3°W – Tropical Depression Sixteen-E strengthens into Tropical Storm Nora about 595 mi (955 km) southwest of Acapulco.

November 9

- 06:00 UTC (10:00 p.m. PST, November 8) at 12.4°N 112.3°W – Tropical Storm Nora strengthens into a Category 1 hurricane about 740 mi (1,195 km) south of the southern tip of the Baja California peninsula, thereby becoming the first recorded Pacific hurricane in November.
- 18:00 UTC (10:00 a.m. PST) at 13.3°N 113.3°W – Hurricane Nora strengthens to Category 2 intensity about 695 mi (1,120 km) south-southwest of the southern tip of the Baja California peninsula.

November 10

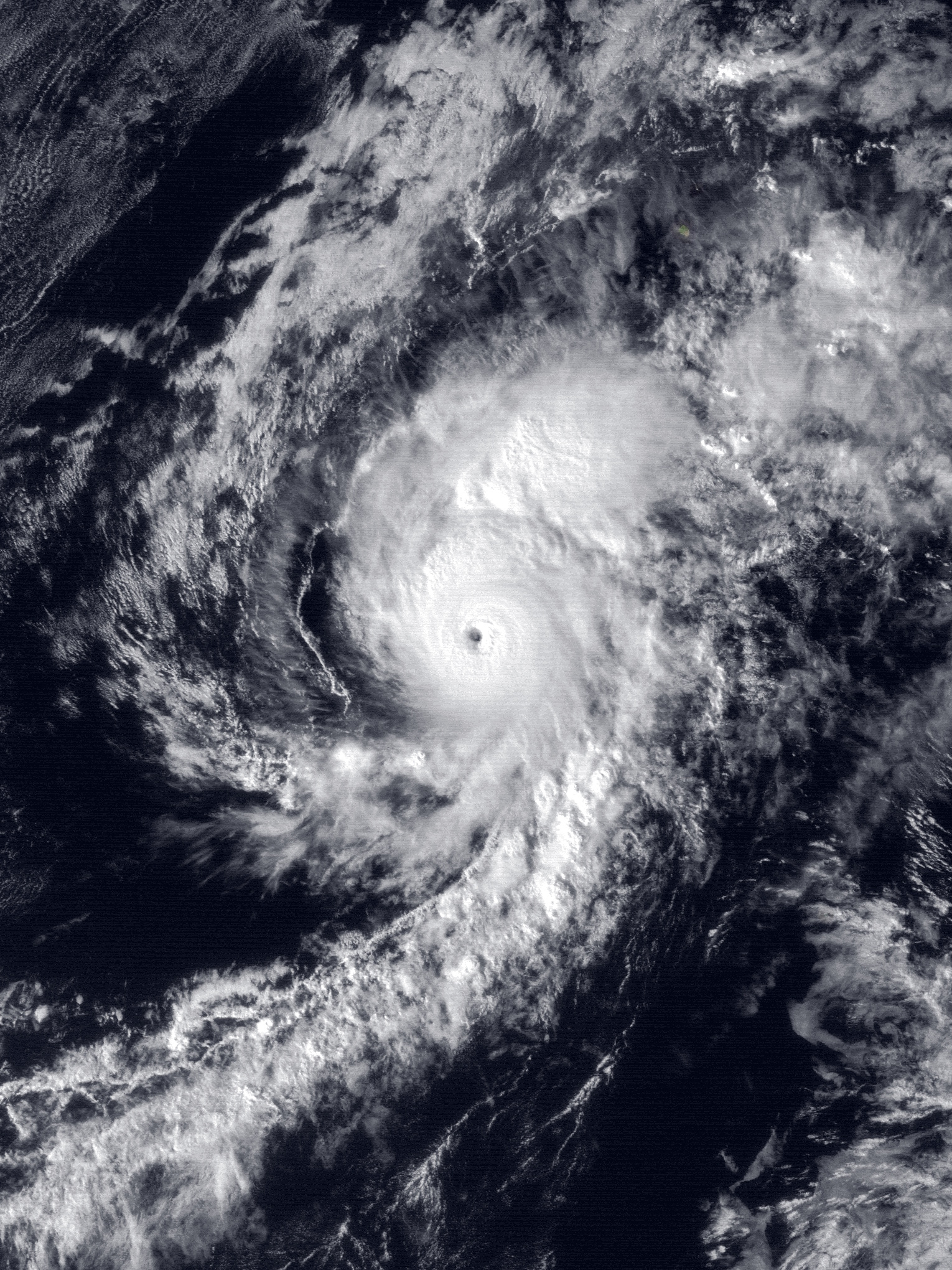
Hurricane Nora near peak intensity late on November 9

- 00:00 UTC (4:00 p.m. PST, November 9) at 13.8°N 113.6°W – Hurricane Nora attains its peak intensity, with maximum sustained winds of 105 mph (165 km/h) and a minimum central pressure of 970 mbar (28.64 inHg), about 675 mi (1,085 km) south-southwest of the southern tip of the Baja California peninsula.
- 18:00 UTC (10:00 a.m. PST) at 14.9°N 114.1°W – Hurricane Nora weakens to Category 1 intensity about 615 mi (990 km) south-southwest of the southern tip of the Baja California peninsula.

November 11

- 00:00 UTC (4:00 p.m. PST, November 10) at 15.1°N 114.1°W – Hurricane Nora weakens into a tropical storm about 600 mi (965 km) south-southwest of the southern tip of the Baja California peninsula.
- 18:00 UTC (10:00 a.m. PST) at 16.2°N 112.3°W – Tropical Storm Nora weakens into a tropical depression about 485 mi (780 km) south-southwest of the southern tip of the Baja California peninsula.

November 12

- 18:00 UTC (10:00 a.m. PST) at 21.4°N 109.0°W – Tropical Depression Nora is last noted as a tropical cyclone about 120 mi (195 km) south-southeast of the southern tip of the Baja California peninsula, dissipating shortly thereafter.

November 30

- The 1991 Pacific hurricane season officially ends.

== See also ==
- List of Pacific hurricane records
- Timeline of the 1991 Atlantic hurricane season
- Tropical cyclones in 1991
