= Automated Tropical Cyclone Forecasting System =

Software used to predict and track tropical cyclones

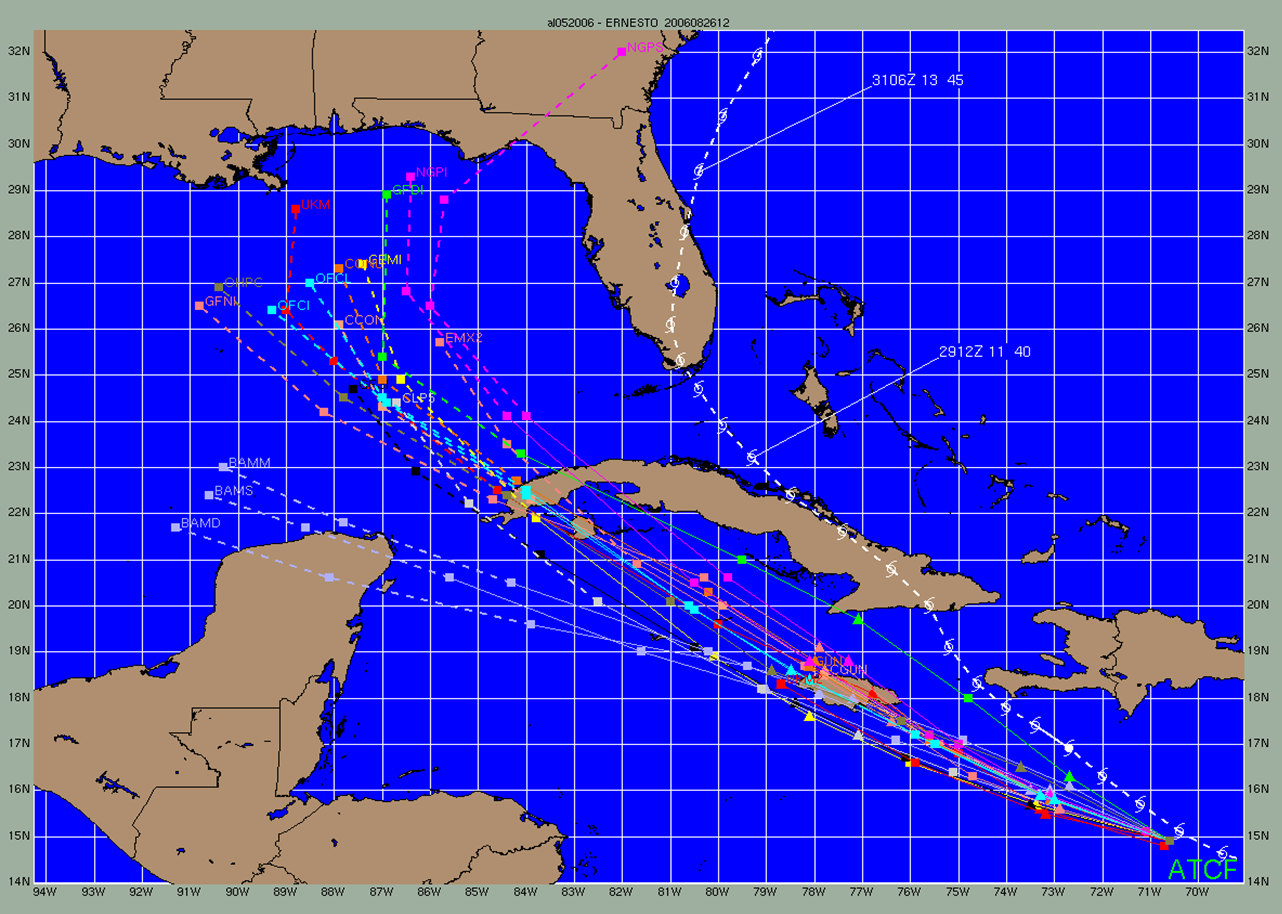
This is how forecast model tracks appear within ATCF. This example is from 2006 Ernesto's first advisory. The NHC official forecast is light blue, while the storm's actual track is the white line over Florida.

The Automated Tropical Cyclone Forecasting System (ATCF) is a piece of software originally developed to run on a personal computer for the Joint Typhoon Warning Center (JTWC) in 1988, and the National Hurricane Center (NHC) in 1990. ATCF remains the main piece of forecasting software used for the United States Government, including the JTWC, NHC, and Central Pacific Hurricane Center. Other tropical cyclone centers in Australia and Canada developed similar software in the 1990s. The data files with ATCF lie within three decks, known as the a-, b-, and f-decks. The a-decks include forecast information, the b-decks contain a history of center fixes at synoptic hours, and the f-decks include the various fixes made by various analysis center at various times. In the years since its introduction, it has been adapted to Unix and Linux platforms.

== Reason for development ==
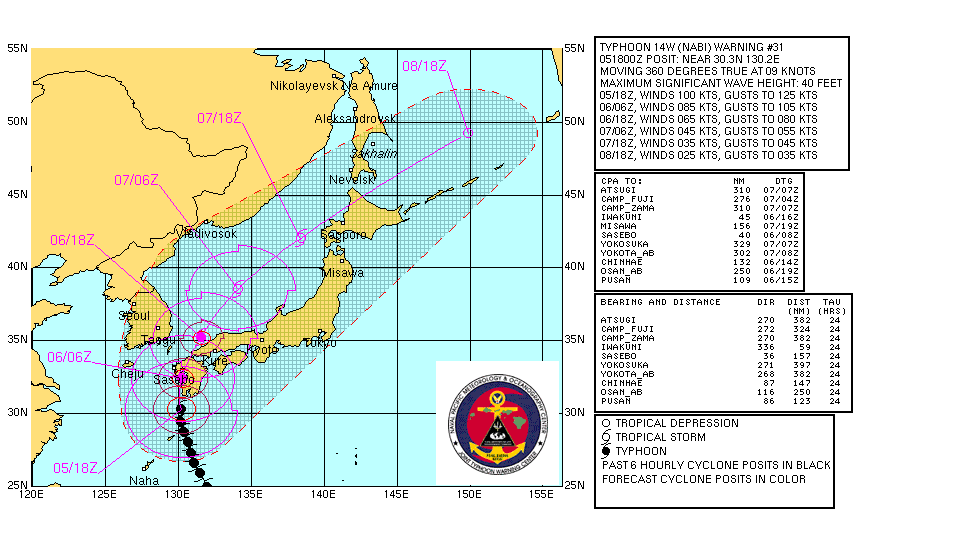
ATCF image of Nabi's (2005) previous track, forecast track, along with tropical storm, storm, and hurricane-force wind radii depicted, from 18z on September 5

The need for a more modernized method for forecasting tropical cyclones had become apparent by the mid-1980s. At that time, the Department of Defense was using acetate, grease pencils, and disparate computer programs to forecast tropical cyclones. The ATCF software was developed by the Naval Research Laboratory for the Joint Typhoon Warning Center (JTWC) in Monterey, California beginning in 1986, and used since 1988. In the 1990s, the system was adapted by the National Hurricane Center (NHC) for use at the NHC, National Centers for Environmental Prediction, and the Central Pacific Hurricane Center. This provided the NHC with a multitasking software environment which allowed them to improve efficiency and cut the time required to make a forecast by 25% or 1 hour. ATCF was originally developed for MS-DOS, before being adapted to Unix and Linux.

== System identification ==
Systems within ATCF are identified with the basin prefix (AL – North Atlantic Ocean, CP – Central North Pacific Ocean, EP – North-East Pacific Ocean, IO – North Indian Ocean, SH – Southern Hemisphere, SL – South Atlantic Ocean, WP – North-West Pacific Ocean) and then followed by two digit number between 01 and 49 for active tropical cyclones, which becomes incremented with each new system, and then the year associated with the system (e.g., EP202015 for Hurricane Patricia). Numbers from 50 through 79 after the basin acronym are used internally by the basin's respective Tropical Cyclone Warning Centers and Regional Specialized Meteorological Center. Numbers in the 80s are used for training purposes and can be reused. Numbers in the 90s are used for areas of interest, sometimes referred to as invests or areas of disturbed weather, and are also reused within any particular year. Their status is listed the following ways within the associated data file: DB – disturbance, TD – tropical depression, TS – tropical storm, TY – typhoon, ST – super typhoon, TC – tropical cyclone, HU – hurricane, SD – subtropical depression, SS – subtropical storm, EX – extratropical systems, IN – inland, DS – dissipating, LO – low, WV – tropical wave, ET – extrapolated, and XX – unknown. Times used are in a four digit year, month, day, and hour format.

== Data formats and locations in ATCF ==
The "A deck" contains the official track and intensity forecast, as well as the model guidance, also known as the objective aids. The "B deck" contains the storm's track information at synoptic hours (0000, 0600, 1200, and 1800 UTC). The "F deck" contains what are known as position fixes and intensity estimates for the associated tropical cyclone, based on satellite data on the cyclone derived by the Dvorak technique. The "E deck" contains information regarding position error and probabilistic information regarding the forecast at that time.

== Similar software used elsewhere ==
In the 1990s, other countries developed similar tropical cyclone forecasting software. The Bureau of Meteorology in Australia developed the Australian Tropical Cyclone Workstation. The Canadian Hurricane Centre developed Canadian Hurricane Centre Forecaster's Workstation, which runs on Unix workstations.
