= Central Pacific Hurricane Center =

United States National Weather Service body

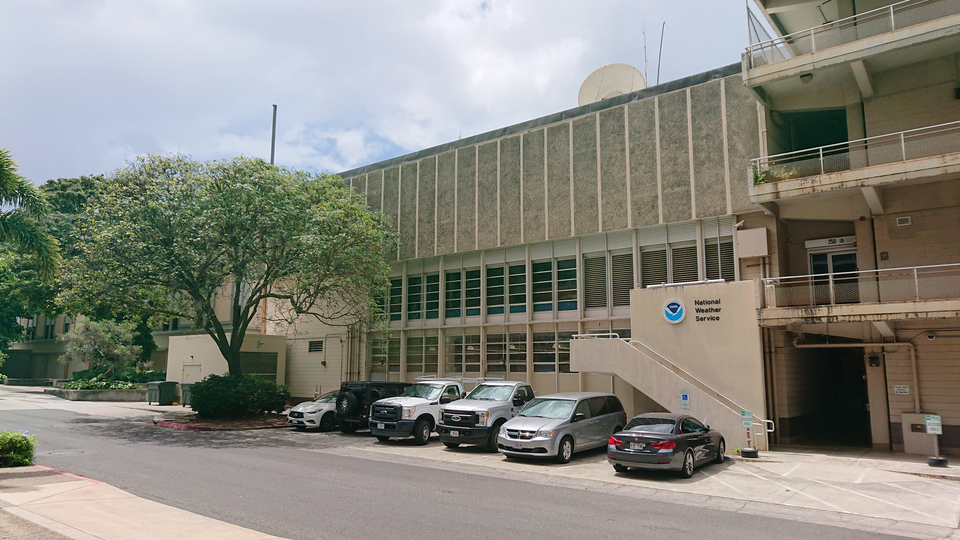
- Front view of the Central Pacific Hurricane Center

Agency overview
- Jurisdiction: United States government
- Headquarters: Honolulu, Hawaii, U.S.; 21°17′55″N 157°49′00″W
- Parent agency: NOAA

The Central Pacific Hurricane Center (CPHC) of the United States National Weather Service was the official body responsible for tracking and issuing tropical cyclone warnings, watches, advisories, discussions, and statements for the Central Pacific region: from the equator northward, 140°W–180°W, most significantly for Hawai‘i. It was the Regional Specialized Meteorological Center (RSMC) for tropical cyclones in this region, and in this capacity was known as RSMC Honolulu.

Based in Honolulu, Hawaii, the CPHC was co-located with the National Weather Service's Honolulu forecast office on the campus of the University of Hawaiʻi at Mānoa. The Honolulu forecast office activated the CPHC when tropical cyclones formed in, or moved into, the Central Pacific region. The CPHC replaced the previous forecaster, the Joint Hurricane Warning Center, starting in the 1970 season.

Starting on June 1, 2025 until January 24, 2026, two CPHC forecasters were integrated into the National Hurricane Center as a proof of concept for unifying the central and eastern Pacific basins under one mission. After this proof of concept, the NHC formally assumed responsibility for the central Pacific basin beginning with the 2026 hurricane season.

== Area of responsibility ==
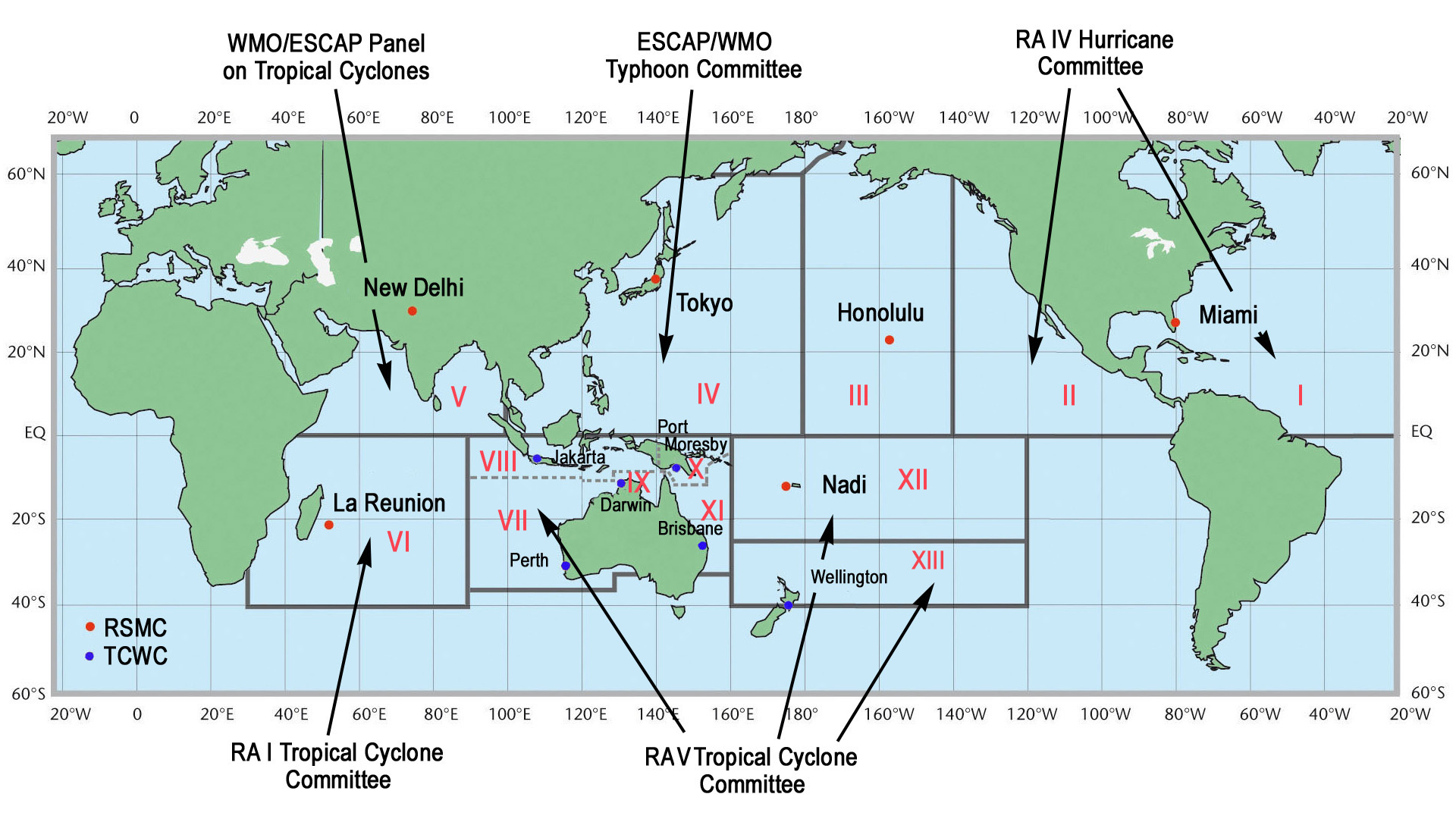
Areas of responsibility, showing RSMC Honolulu's area (Region III).

The CPHC's area of responsibility is the Central Pacific (CP) region, which is an administrative region, not a meteorological one. It is not a tropical cyclone basin (a distinct area where cyclones form), but is still often referred to as the Central Pacific basin or Central North Pacific basin. The western edge of the area of responsibility, 180°W, is formally the antimeridian, though this coincides with the International Date Line for tropical latitudes, and thus these are often conflated. Meteorologically, this region covers the western part of the Eastern Pacific basin and the eastern part of the Western Pacific basin, though administratively the National Hurricane Center is responsible for the Eastern Pacific basin east of 140°W, and thus the Eastern Pacific region (EP) typically refers to region east of 140°W, not the whole meteorological basin. The region east of 140°W was formerly the responsibility of the Eastern Pacific Hurricane Center; like the CPHC, it took responsibility in 1970, but it is now folded into the NHC.

In this area, the hurricane season lasts from June 1 through November 30. Practically, storms may form in the Eastern Pacific region (east or west of 140°W) and move west, possibly affecting Hawaii, or in the Western Pacific basin and move west, possibly affecting Asia. Smaller islands may also be affected, though this region is otherwise very sparsely populated.

== Forecasting system ==
Since the 1990s, the CPHC has used the Automated Tropical Cyclone Forecasting System to create forecasts, advisories, and their associated graphics.

== See also ==
- Joint Typhoon Warning Center (JTWC)
- List of tropical cyclone names#Central North Pacific Ocean (140°W to 180°)
