= Perfect storm (disambiguation) =

A perfect storm is a confluence of events that drastically aggravates a situation.

Perfect storm may also refer to:

- 1991 Perfect Storm, a weather event
  - The Perfect Storm (book), a 1997 book by Sebastian Junger about the 1991 Perfect Storm
  - The Perfect Storm (film), a 2000 film adapted from the book

== Television ==
- "Perfect Storm" (Flashpoint)
- "The Perfect Storm" (The O.C.)
- "The Perfect Storm" (Pretty Little Liars)
- "Perfect Storm" (Tru Calling)
- "Perfect Storm" (Grey's Anatomy)
- Perfect Storm: Disasters That Changed The World, a Canadian historical documentary series

== Music ==
- The Perfect Storm (album), by Twista, 2010
- Perfect Storm (EP), by Tomorrow X Together, 2026
- Perfect Storm, an album by Hurricane Wisdom, 2025
- "Perfect Storm" (song), by Brad Paisley, 2014
- "Perfect Storm", a song by AJ Tracey from Flu Game, 2021

== Other ==
- The Perfect Storm, a concept in the ministry and marketing from John Paul Jackson
- Carl Crawford (born 1981), nicknamed "The Perfect Storm", an American professional baseball left fielder with the Los Angeles Dodgers
