= Tropical cyclones in popular culture =

The appearances of tropical cyclones in popular culture spans many genres of media and encompasses many different plot uses.

It includes both fictional tropical cyclones, (Note: Depending on their location and strength, tropical cyclones are referred to by various other names, such as hurricane, typhoon, tropical storm, cyclonic storm, and tropical depression.) and real ones used as the basis for a fictional work, and has proven to be of enough interest for the National Oceanic and Atmospheric Administration ("NOAA") to maintain a webpage on the topic.

== Purpose in fiction and literature ==
Although many forms of natural disaster appear in fiction and literature, tropical cyclones serve a number of useful literary functions because they are both extraordinarily powerful and, to those who have some experience with them, their occurrence can be portended several days in advance. The NOAA page notes that:

There is undeniable drama to hurricanes; their massive scale affecting the lives of thousands, the foreshadowing of impending doom, and their ponderous pace as they approach the shore. This has made them ideal plot elements in many fictional works.

The strength of the tropical cyclone has made it a device by which authors explain the upending of characters' lives, and even transformations of the personalities of those who live through such an event. Their somewhat hazy predictability also makes them a useful MacGuffin, an impetus for characters to set to action. In some instances, the storm provides cover for characters to engage in covert behavior.

== Early history of tropical cyclones in literature ==
One of the earliest uses of a tropical cyclone as a plot device occurs in a William Shakespeare play, The Tempest, first performed in 1611 or 1612. There, a storm (raised by the sorcerer Prospero) blows key characters to the island to which Prospero had been exiled many years before. The theme is said to have been inspired by Shakespeare's knowledge of a real-life hurricane which had caused the shipwreck of the Sea Venture in 1609 on the islands of Bermuda, while sailing toward Virginia.

Edgar Allan Poe, in his 1841 story, "A Descent into the Maelström", has the main character describe how "the most terrible hurricane that ever came out of the heavens" forced the boat crewed by himself and his brothers into a gigantic whirlpool. The trauma of surviving the storm and the whirlpool (and seeing the death of his brothers) is asserted to have a profound effect on the character, causing his hair to turn white. However, since the story is asserted to occur off the coast of Norway, it is unlikely that the event described could have fallen within the formal definition of a hurricane, as such storms form almost exclusively in the Maritime Tropical air masses of tropical regions of the globe.

Joseph Conrad, in his acclaimed 1903 book Typhoon, uses a tropical cyclone as a more direct element of the story, centering the plot on a ship captain's stubborn insistence on going into the heart of such a storm.

== Fictional tropical cyclones ==
=== Works predominantly focused on the occurrence of a fictional tropical cyclone ===
==== Books and plays ====
- (Unnamed): A High Wind in Jamaica (U.S. title: The Innocent Voyage). In this 1929 novel by Richard Hughes, horrific incidents are described from a child's point of view, beginning with the destruction of the family's house by a hurricane. "If Emily had known this was a Hurricane, she would doubtless have been far more impressed, for the word was full of romantic terrors...."
- (Unnamed): In Hazard, a 1938 novel by Richard Hughes. A single-screw turbine cargo steamer encounters a hurricane off the coast of Cuba. Reviewers compared it to Joseph Conrad's Typhoon, admired the weather descriptions, complained of "puppet-like" characters.
- (Unnamed): The Mystery of the Double Double Cross A 1982 novel by Mary Blount Christian prominently features a hurricane hitting Galveston, TX.
- Tropical Storm Barney: The name of an artificially enhanced tropical storm that strikes Barbados with winds in excess of 75 mph (121 km/h) in opening of the novel, Category 7: The Biggest Storm in History. The authors describe the storms sudden intensification as "...bloated menacing clouds exploding over the open ocean with the unholy force of a mid-air detonation." This description is the books leitmotif for a manipulated storm.
- Hurricane Claude: A team of scientists try to use an EMP burst to destroy a Category Two hurricane following a track similar to that of the Long Island Express. Preceded by Hurricane Barbara.
- Hurricane Faith: Category Five Cape Verde hurricane which hits New York City with full force, causing a storm surge that topples the Statue of Liberty and inflicts severe damage on the rest of the city. The novels hurricane season prior to the appearance of Faith is described by one of the characters as "Just five in six weeks since the start of the season. And every one has gone flatter than my wife's pancakes in less than a week". Of these storms, only hurricanes Anthony(Category One), Barbara, Christopher & Eric are named in the novel.
- Hurricane Mabel: The name of the storm in Desmond Bagley's 1966 novel Wyatt's Hurricane. The titular scientist predicts the hurricane will strike a small Caribbean island despite what the models show. Local rebels use it to help overthrow the island's dictator. Mabel is described at the start of the novel as having a central pressure of 870 millibars and an outside pressure of 1040 millibars and winds strong enough to classify it as Category Five. Reference is also made in the novel to Hurricane Ione as proof of the difficulties of forecasting a hurricanes course. Preceded by Hurricane Laura.
- Maria: The name of the storm in George R. Stewart's bestselling 1941 novel, Storm. Although not, strictly speaking, a hurricane, the storm is highly notable for receiving a woman's name, the first widely known example of such personification. In the novel, a character referred to only as "the Junior Meteorologist" gives storms women's names as a private mental game. Stewart said that he was inspired by reading that "a certain meteorologist had even felt storms to be so personal that he had given them names." Stewart's book in turn inspired Lerner and Loewe's song "They Call the Wind Maria." It is widely thought to have influenced U.S. Navy meteorologists, who gave female names to Pacific tropical storms during World War II.
- Hurricane Omega: The name of a Category Five hurricane threatening the east coast of the United States that is deflected by moving the jet stream.
- Hurricane Simone: The name of an artificially created storm that threatens to hit New York City with a strength of above Category Five in the novel, Category 7: The Biggest Storm in History. While the storm is successfully disrupted before it makes landfall, the storm surge it generates devastates the city and topples the Statue of Liberty into the Hudson. Reference is made to Hurricanes Mitch & Ivan as being the products of trial runs of the technology used to create Simone, which was originally developed and tested during the 1971 Pacific typhoon season by the U.S. Government.

==== Television ====
- (Unnamed): Category Five storm of mysterious origin that threatens Miami with winds of over 250 mph (400 km/h) in the first-season episode Target Hurricane of Science Fiction Theater.
- Hurricane Grace and Hurricane Agatha: The made-for-BBC movie Superstorm, starring Tom Sizemore and Nicola Stephenson, involves two hurricanes named Grace and Agatha. Grace is a Category 5 hurricane that strikes Long Island, where the Stormshield headquarters is located. Agatha downs a plane.
- Hurricane Eduardo: Hit the United States east coast, particularly Florida, in Category 7: The End of the World, and later merged with a destructive non-tropical system near Washington, D.C. The resulting storm was more powerful than either of the other two. The NOAA website sums up the somewhat shoddy science as follows: "Falling chunks of the mesosphere combine with urban heat islands to spawn global spanning superstorms." Eduardo is considered as a Category 5 hurricane.
- Hurricane Gil: Hit Miami on a November 9, 1991, multiple crossover episode of The Golden Girls (The Monkey Show(Parts 1 & 2)), Empty Nest (Windy), and Nurses (Begone with the Wind), forcing characters from each show to take refuge in the locale of the other two shows.
- Hurricane Hilda: Massive storm based on Hurricane Camille hits the town of Cassier, Mississippi causing great devastation.
- Super Typhoon Vipa: a massive storm makes a direct hit on Hong Kong causing death and destruction in the Discovery Channel series 'Perfect Disaster'. Category 5 typhoon.

==== Music ====
- (Unnamed): Hugh Prestwood dreams of a hurricane in his song Savannah Fare You Well. The hurricane produces heavy rainfall which kills the songwriter.
- (Various): Jimmy Buffett has penned a number of songs describing the effects of unnanmed tropical cyclones. In his A1A song Trying to Reason with the Hurricane Season he describes a storm in the Gulf Stream with winds greater than 60 mph. The storm produces rough seas and grey skies in southeastern Florida. In Nobody Speaks to the Captain No More on his Floridays album, a fugitive captain loses his mind during a hurricane when a coconut hits him in the head. Buffett describes a sailor who goes through several hurricanes and typhoons in his Christmas Island song A Sailor's Christmas." Finally, several hurricanes affect the fictional Caribbean island of Kinja in the Jimmy Buffett song Don't Stop the Carnival.
- (Unnamed): Creedence Clearwater Revival sings a warning about hearing "hurricanes a-blowing" and fearing "rivers overflowing," among other disasters, in band frontman John Fogerty's apocalyptic Bad Moon Rising (song).

=== Works in which a fictional tropical cyclone is a key event ===
==== Books and plays ====
- (Unnamed): A hurricane striking the South Carolina setting is a major turning point of the 1925 novel Porgy, and its later adaptation, the subsequent 1935 opera Porgy and Bess, as well as the 1959 movie version. The storm causes the death of key characters, causing a sudden change in the direction of the story.

Cover artwork for The Cay, showing the characters trying to survive the hurricane

- (Unnamed): The Cay. A pivotal point of the story involves the hurricane that strikes the small island where the two main characters are marooned. Phillip, a prejudiced, blind, white child, is stranded with the elderly black Timothy. The pair deals with a hurricane that passes across the island by lashing themselves to a sturdy palm. The storm injures the eighty-year-old Timothy, who slowly dies afterwards.
- (Unnamed): In the 1966 techno-thriller Hunter-Killer by Geoffrey Jenkins, the heroes use the conditions induced by an Indian Ocean cyclone to evade a search by the United States Navy's Seventh Fleet.
- (Unnamed): In Douglas Reemans 1966 novel Path of the Storm, the author uses a Philippine Sea typhoon with a strength of at least Category Three as the reason for the hero and his ship to return to the Taiwanese island they have just left in time to prevent an invasion by China.
- (Unnamed): A Category One hurricane threatening Cape Canaveral in the science-fiction thriller Gravity by Tess Gerritsen. It forces the seriously ill crew of the Space Shuttle Discovery to make an attempt to land at White Sands Space Harbor.
- Hurricane Adele: The name of the storm in Thomas Clancy's Clear and Present Danger. Described by the author as "...a small, weak, disorganized hurricane, now turning back into a tropical storm..." its presence complicates a tricky rescue mission.
- Cyclone Alpha: In the 1972 novel (Set sometime between 1959 and 1965.) The Moonraker Mutiny by Anthony Trew, a ship's captain drunkenly applies his experience of typhoons to a Category Three Indian Ocean cyclone. As a result, the ship sails into the heart of the storm and is crippled, triggering the mutiny of the title.
- Hurricane Amanda: The name of the Beaufort Fifteen level storm in Clive Cussler's Raise the Titanic. The Soviet Navy used the storm as cover to board the newly raised ship in an attempt to sabotage the retrieval of a rare (fictional) mineral, byzanium, for use in an anti-ballistic missile defense system.
- Hurricane Annabelle: The name of the hurricane in the 1939 set novel Slade's Marauder by Steven Cade. It prevents the hero's ship from escaping a German commerce raider. (Note: The name is anachronistic, at the time the story is set hurricanes were not named.)
- Hurricane Ben: The name of the storm in G.M. Hagues Ghost Beyond Earth. The hurricane prevents NASA from sending a Space Shuttle to the crew of Space Station Freedom until the end of the novel.
- Typhoon Bernard: The name of the storm that delays the arrival of Soviet ships coming to pick up a sabotage party in Shuttle Down by Lee Correy.
- Hurricane Carmen: In the novel The Lies We Told by Diane Chamberlain, this Category Four hurricane strikes the area around Wilmington, North Carolina causing widespread damage and for the two major characters beginning a sequence of events that leads both to question the direction of their lives. Succeeded by Hurricanes Donald and Erin, the latter of which also reaches Category Four.
- Hurricane Dana: In Karen Harper's romantic thriller, Hurricane, the villains try to use the effects of the storm and its passage to cover up a series of murders.
- Typhoon Donald: Named by "...a wit in the Hong Kong typhoon center...", this Category Three typhoon is used by the crew of the pirate battleship Stalin to conceal their approach on the first of their targets in the novel The Iron Man by John Watson. Preceded by Typhoon Charlie
- Tropical Storm Hannah: The name of a storm that hits the Caribbean unexpectedly in the novel Star Shot by Douglas Terman. The author uses it to show the skill and determination of the hero.
- Hurricane Herman: In The Wide Window (the third book of Lemony Snicket's A Series of Unfortunate Events), this hurricane demolishes Aunt Josephine's home. Later on in the book, Violet, Klaus, and Sunny Baudelaire endure the brunt of the storm while searching for their aunt.
- Hurricane Hope: Kristen Ethridge's contemporary romance series spanning five books focuses on the impact of Hurricane Hope on the fictional Texas gulf coast town of Port Provident. Ethridge based the books on her own experiences going through 2008's Hurricane Ike in Galveston, Texas.
- Hurricane Joyce: The name of the monstrous, continent-spanning storm triggered by the impact of the asteroid Hermes into the North Atlantic in the 1978 novel The Hermes Fall by John Baxter. Powered in part by the heat of the asteroid's impact, the hurricane produces wind speeds "...more than double the record of 171 knots - almost two hundred miles an hour set by the hurricane in 1966." (e.g. 400 mph (640 km/h)) near the eye as it makes its way up the eastern coast of the United States.
- Hurricane Juanita: In Kathryn Caseys novel The Killing Storm, the hunt for a boy kidnapped by a serial killer is complicated by a Category Four hurricane on a course to strike Houston.
- Hurricane Little Eva: The name of the storm in Clive Cussler's Cyclops. Described as "...a small blow with a diameter no more than sixty miles wide." The storm strands the heroes on an island used by the Soviets as an electronic intelligence post.
- Hurricane Lorna: Category Five hurricane that threatens environmental havoc in Wilbur Smiths Hungry As The Sea, the storm is disrupted when the cargo of the world's largest oil tanker is ignited at its heart.
- Typhoon Louise: In the 1986 thriller Tsunami, the hero investigates the sinking of a ship off the coast of Taiwan by this storm, uncovering evidence that the storm has been used to cover up insurance fraud.
- Hurricane Odin: The name of a Category Five hurricane, that forces the hero's plane to crash near a small Caribbean island being used by nuclear smugglers in the novel Second Wind by Dick Francis. Preceded by Hurricane Nicky(Category Three) and followed by Hurricane Sheila (after two unnamed storms),
- Hurricane Phyllis: The name of a Category Five hurricane that strikes South Carolina in the 1970 novel Killers at Sea by Alan Joseph. (Note: A pseudonym for author John Messmann.) The storm reveals the true nature of one character and allows the hero to escape his pursuers in the climax of the story.
- Hurricane Queenie: The name of a Category Five hurricane that strikes New York City on the night of 4 August 1970 in the opening of the novel Summer of Storms by Judith Kelman. The author describes the storm as the "...feisty and temperamental..." seventeenth storm in a season where "Sixteen tropical disturbances had pummeled Caribbean islands and Atlantic seaboard towns since the National Weather Center began its annual six-month count in early June. Twelve of those had grown into full-fledged hurricanes, and six, triple the normal number, had intensified to the most lethal categories...". Queenie's furious arrival in New York City provides the cover for a brutal murder. (Note: Using the 1970 name list the name for this storm would actually have been Rena)
- Typhoon Rose: The name of a Category Five tropical storm that strikes Hong Kong with winds of up to 190 mph (310 km/h) in the novel Typhoon by John Gordon Davis. It triggers massive landslides, kills several of the novel's main characters and provides the impetus for the hero's final encounter with the novels major villain.
- Hurricane Sigrid: The name of the Category Five hurricane that complicates attempts to deal with a madman's home-made nuclear weapon over Washington DC in the novel Medusa's Child by John J. Nance.
- Hurricane Simone: Category Four hurricane that strikes Florida south of Sanibel island as a category three storm, triggering a chain of events that lead to a bloody shootout at an illegal geophysical laboratory in the Florida Everglades.
- Hurricane Tricia: The name of the storm in James Follett's novel Ice. Its arrival complicates attempts to tow a gigantic iceberg away from a collision with the North American continental shelf.
- (Various): Hurricane Punch, a comedic thriller by Tim Dorsey in which a misanthropic serial killer and his bumbling partner-in-crime take an impromptu storm-chasing trek across Florida with a kidnapped journalist in tow.

==== Television ====
- (Unnamed): A 1978 hurricane mentioned in The Simpsons episode "Hurricane Neddy" which blew down Hall of Records, but was never officially confirmed.
- Hurricane Anthony: A couple trying to escape this hurricane strikes a man with their car in the CSI: Miami episode Hurricane Anthony.
- Hurricane Barbara: Hit Springfield in The Simpsons episode "Hurricane Neddy." Destroyed Ned Flanders's house, picked up Barney Gumble's Bowlerama and dumped it on a nearby hill.
- Hurricane Elizabeth: Artificially created Category Five hurricane targeted at Los Angeles in the film Storm. The film's opening reveals that Hurricane Andrew was the result of an earlier test of the same technology.,
- Hurricane Eve: Hit Miami, Florida on the premiere episode of Invasion. Believed to be cover for extraterrestrial activity. Had a pressure of 936 mbar; according to TV Guide, a Category three on the Saffir-Simpson Scale. The NOAA website notes that "[t]he series was cancelled after its initial season, with no resolution to the question, 'Does global warming cause more squid people?'"
- Hurricane Lenore: Shown in the Nip/Tuck episode "Conor McNamara, 2026". Struck Miami.
- Hurricane Norman: Shown on the Family Guy episode "One If By Clam, Two If By Sea." Hit Quahog, Rhode Island with downed power lines, several damaged buildings, and downed trees and brush...
- Tropical Storm Renee: Shown in the Seinfeld episode "The Checks." Struck before 1981, experienced by umbrella salesmen Teddy Padillac and Jerry Seinfeld. The storm dropped heavy rainfall, resulting in good business for the two salesmen.
- Hurricane Robert: Mentioned in an episode of The Fresh Prince of Bel-Air as having wiped out half of Miami and Hilary refers to it as Bobby to "...spread a little sunshine".
- Hurricane RuPaul: Massive storm headed for Quahog in the Family Guy episode "The Perfect Castaway".
- Hurricane Sarah: Strikes the US east coast causing damage to the US fleet in The West Wing episode "The State Dinner".
- Scrambles the Death Dealer: Strikes Florida, devastating the state in the Metalocalypse episode "Dethgov".

==== Theatrical films ====
- (Unnamed): In the 1948 film, Key Largo, gangsters who have taken over a small hotel in the title locale are delayed in their planned getaway by a hurricane. In one exchange, a gang member asks another, "what all happens in a hurricane?" to which the other replies, "The wind blows so hard the ocean gets up on its hind legs and walks right across the land." Later, the leader of the gang is shaken by the presence of the storm, leading Frank McCloud, the protagonist of the film, to say, "You don't like it, do you Rocco, the storm? Show it your gun, why don't you? If it doesn't stop, shoot it."
- (Unnamed): The 1999 film Virus had a tugboat crew seek refuge during a typhoon on board a Russian research ship only to find it occupied by aliens who view humanity as a virus that they try to exterminate.
- (Unnamed, but referred to as Typhoon Eighteen and Typhoon Kenny): Strikes Japan during the events of Welcome to Pia Carrot: Sayaka's Love Story. Causes the title character to develop a fever and triggers waves that sweep the main characters into the ocean.
- Hurricane Alma: The Category One hurricane that delays the launch of the rescue mission in Marooned.
- Hurricane Clarissa: In The Lost World: Jurassic Park. A Pacific hurricane that wiped out the facilities on Site B, near Costa Rica.
- Hurricane Jezebel: Hit New Jersey, in the Brian De Palma film, Snake Eyes, on the night of a prize fight.
- Hurricane Noelani: Massive hurricane in the East Pacific in the movie The Day After Tomorrow. It never made landfall, but was called the strongest hurricane on record.

==== Video games ====
- Hurricane Alex: Near the end of Ace Combat: Assault Horizon, this Category 5 hurricane halted a manhunt for the game's antagonist, Andrei Markov, and his organization, allowing them to launch an aerial assault on the United States. The penultimate mission takes place inside Hurricane Alex itself, as well as inside a large waterspout the hurricane had spawned.
- Hurricane Gordy: At the beginning of the prequel of Grand Theft Auto: Vice City, namely Grand Theft Auto: Vice City Stories, this hurricane was forecast to hit Vice City in summer 1984, with officials closing off all bridges, keeping the player confined to the city's westernmost island. After a while the bridge closures are again lifted.
- Hurricane Hermione: At the beginning of Grand Theft Auto: Vice City, this hurricane was forecast to hit Vice City in 1986, forcing officials to close all bridges, keeping the player confined to the city's easternmost island. As the game progresses, the bridge closures are lifted as it is announced that the hurricane has missed Vice City.
- Cyclone Sanvu: An extremely powerful cyclone in Fate of the World that devastates an unspecified coastline in 2018. Called by many experts the world's first Hypercane, this catastrophic storm helps gather support for the formation of the Global Environmental Organization in 2020, which the player controls as president of the organization.

== Fictional accounts of real tropical cyclones ==
=== Works predominantly focused on the occurrence of a tropical cyclone ===
==== Books ====
- Hurricane Carol (1954): Denis Lehane's 2003 novel Shutter Island is set in 1954 on an island off the U.S. eastern seaboard, as the hurricane strikes two U.S. Marshalls search for a murderess who has escaped from a mental hospital for the criminally insane.,
- 1991 Perfect Storm: Sebastian Junger's novel The Perfect Storm is about the crew of the Andrea Gail during the storm.
- Hurricane Andrew (1992): Carl Hiaasen's Stormy Weather gives a madcap tale of the aftermath of Andrew's visit to South Florida in 1992, lambasting shoddy builders and corrupt inspectors, and providing happy endings for most of those who deserve it, and biblical punishments for those that don't.
- Hurricane Vince (2005): Robin White's Hunters in the Sea opens with a Los Angeles class submarine searching for a Hurricane Hunter aircraft which had been downed investigating Hurricane Vince.

==== Television ====
- Cyclone Tracy (1974): The Nine Network's dramatic miniseries Cyclone Tracy is based on the events surrounding the cyclone.
- Hurricane Katrina (2005): K-Ville is an American television drama centered on policing New Orleans after the hurricane.

==== Theatrical films ====
- 1991 Perfect Storm: The film adaptation of Sebastian Junger's The Perfect Storm is about the crew of the Andrea Gail during the storm.

==== Music ====
- Cyclone Tracy (1974): Bill Cate's charity song "Santa Never made it into Darwin", in 1974 to raise money for the relief after the disaster.
- Cyclone Tracy (1974): Hoodoo Gurus' song "Tojo", from the 1984 album Stoneage Romeos, personifying Tracy as callously justifying hitting Darwin by the fact that the city was spared from Japanese invasion during World War II.
- Hurricane Katrina (2005): Jimmy Buffett's song Breathe In, Breathe Out, Move On describes the effect of Hurricane Katrina on New Orleans and the need to move on after a disaster. Green Day and U2's charity song, "The Saints Are Coming" in 2006 to raise money for the relief after the disaster. This song was originally sung by The Skids, who first recorded the song in 1978.

=== Works in which a tropical cyclone is a key event ===
==== Theatrical films ====
- Great New England Hurricane of 1938: In John M. Stahl's 1939 film When Tomorrow Comes, based on James M. Cain's idea for The Root of His Evil (called The Modern Cinderella, a name that was also used in some publicity material for Stahl's film) two lovers are trapped by a hurricane that causes major damage to the Northeast. The storm forces the two to stay the night together in a church, simultaneously ending a strike that Irene Dunne's character organized, bringing the lovers closer together, and prompting major conflicts with other characters. Although the storm is not named, the film was released in 1939, and the major hurricane that struck New England the year before would have been the storm most closely associated with it.
- Hurricane Carmen (1974): A pivotal scene in Forrest Gump occurs when Gump and his former commanding officer, Lieutenant Dan Taylor, ride out the storm in Gump's shrimping boat; having been the only such boat to remain at sea, theirs is the only one not wrecked by the storm, allowing an unwitting Gump to monopolize the shrimping industry and become a millionaire. During the storm, Lieutenant Dan - in an alcoholic depression since the loss of his legs in the Vietnam War - challenges God, who is embodied in the fury of the hurricane. After surviving the event, Lieutenant Dan finally makes peace with his fate.

== See also ==
- Popular culture studies
- Tropical cyclones and climate change
