= Perfect storm =

Phrase

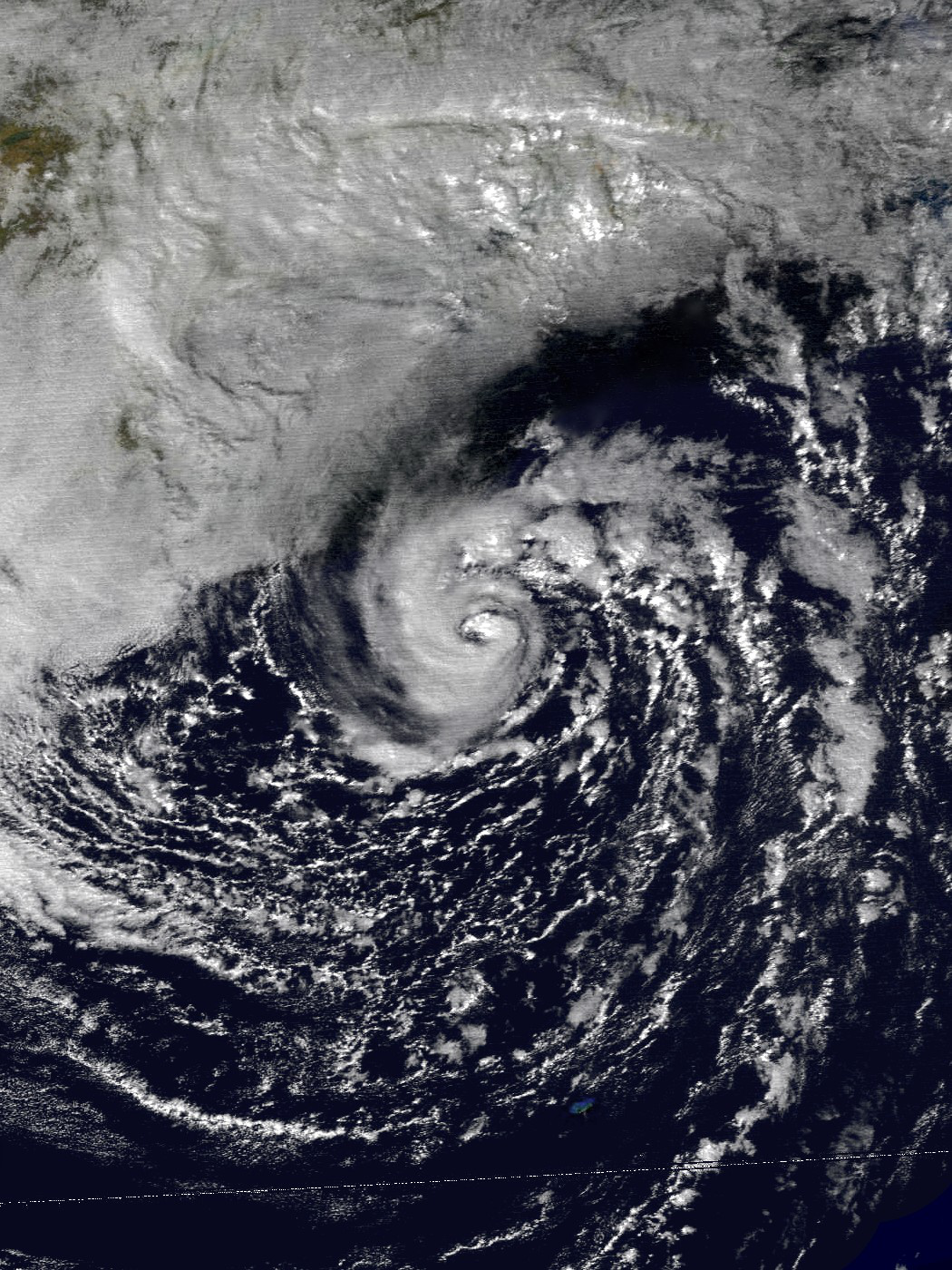
Satellite image of northeast U.S. coast on November 1, 1991. Depicted is the 1991 Perfect Storm.

A perfect storm is an unusually severe storm aggravated by some rare combination of various meteorological phenomena.

Before the early 1990s, the phrases "storm of the century" or "perfect storm" were generally used to describe unusually large or destructive storms. The term superstorm was employed in 1993 by the US National Weather Service to describe a nor'easter in March of that year. The term is most frequently used to describe a weather pattern that is as destructive as a hurricane, but which exhibits the cold-weather patterns of a winter storm.

== Origin ==
The Oxford English Dictionary has published references going back to 1718 for "perfect storm", though the earliest citations use the phrase in the sense of "absolute" or "complete", or for emphasis, as in "a perfect stranger".

The phrase appears in William Makepeace Thackeray's novel Vanity Fair (1847-1848)

I have heard a brother of the story-telling trade at Naples preaching to a pack of good-for-nothing honest, lazy fellows by the sea-shore, work himself up into such a rage and passion with some of the villains whose wicked deeds he was describing and inventing, that the audience could not resist it; and they and the poet together would burst out into a roar of oaths and execrations against the fictitious monster of the tale, so that the hat went round, and the bajocchi tumbled into it, in the midst of a perfect storm of sympathy.

The first known use of the expression in the meteorological sense is on May 30, 1850, when the Rev. Lloyd of Withington describes ″A perfect storm of thunder and lightning all over England (except London) doing fearful and fatal damage″ when recording monthly rainfall measurements for that year. This record is kept by the UK Meteorological Office. The next recorded instance is in the March 20, 1936, issue of the Port Arthur News in Texas: "The weather bureau describes the disturbance as 'the perfect storm' of its type. Seven factors were involved in the chain of circumstances that led to the flood."

In 1993, journalist and author Sebastian Junger planned to write a book about a fishing boat caught in the 1991 Halloween Nor'easter storm. Technically, this storm was an extratropical cyclone. In the course of his research, he spoke with Bob Case, who had been a deputy meteorologist in the Boston office of the National Weather Service at the time of the storm. Case described to Junger the confluence of three different weather-related phenomena that combined to create what Case referred to as the "perfect situation" to generate such a storm:

- warm air from a low-pressure system coming from one direction
- a flow of cool and dry air generated by a high-pressure from another direction
- tropical moisture provided by tropical storm (or hurricane)

From that, Junger keyed on Case's use of the word perfect and coined the phrase perfect storm, choosing to use The Perfect Storm as the title of his book.

Junger published his book The Perfect Storm in 1997 and its success brought the phrase into popular culture. Its adoption was accelerated with the release of the 2000 feature film adaptation of Junger's book. Since the release of the movie, the phrase has grown to mean any event where a situation is aggravated drastically by an exceptionally rare combination of circumstances.

Although the 1991 Halloween Nor'easter was a powerful storm by any measure, there have been other storms that have exceeded its strength. According to Case, the type of convergence of weather events to which he was referring, while unusual, is not exceptionally rare or unique, despite the way the phrase is commonly used.

== Other uses ==
The phrase saw heavy use from the beginning of the 2008 financial crisis, even to the point of pundits anticipating "another perfect storm".

The phrase was awarded the top prize by Lake Superior State University in their 2007 list of words that deserve to be banned for overuse.

The catastrophic wildfires of July 2026 in Spain were described by the regional mayor of the province Community of Madrid, Isabel Díaz Ayuso, as “...the worst fire in the history of the Madrid region, a perfect storm, with extremely high temperatures, a relentless wind and the misfortune of having several fire fronts join together”.

== See also ==
- ARkStorm
- Blizzard
- Bomb cyclone
- Butterfly effect
- Hypercane
- Spring tide
- Synergy
