= Linda Greenlaw =

American novelist (born 1960)

- Born: December 22, 1960 (age 65); Connecticut, U.S.
- Education: Colby College
- Occupations: Author, fisher
- Writing career
- Genres: Maritime, autobiography, detective fiction, cookbooks
- Notable awards: U.S. Maritime Literature Award (2003); New England Book Award (2004)

Linda Greenlaw (born December 22, 1960) is an American author of books with maritime themes and the only female swordfishing boat captain on the East Coast of the United States. She was featured in the 1997 book The Perfect Storm and the film The Perfect Storm.

Greenlaw wrote three best-selling books about life as a commercial fisher: The Hungry Ocean in 1999, The Lobster Chronicles in 2002 and All Fishermen Are Liars in 2002.

Her books have climbed as high as No. 2 on The New York Times Best Seller list, with The Hungry Ocean remaining on the list for three months.

Greenlaw lives on Isle au Haut, Maine, and was the first female sword-fishing boat captain on the American East Coast.

== Early life ==
Greenlaw was born in Connecticut, the daughter of Jim and Martha Greenlaw. Her father was an information systems manager for Bath Iron Works. She was raised in Topsham, Maine, and her family spent their summers in Isle au Haut, a village of 71 people off the coast of Maine. Greenlaw attended Colby College, where she majored in both English and government. To help pay her way through college, Linda worked as a cook and deckhand aboard the sword-fishing boat Walter Leeman during her summers. She continued working on the boat during free time and vacations and, after her graduation in 1983, continued working for the boat's owner, Alden Leeman, who installed Greenlaw as a swordfish captain in 1986 when he acquired a second vessel.

Greenlaw wrote in The Hungry Ocean: "Being a woman hasn't been a big deal. I never anticipated problems stemming from being female, and never encountered any. I have been surprised, even embarrassed, by the number of people who are genuinely amazed that a woman might be capable of running a fishing boat."

== Career ==
=== Commercial fisherman ===
Greenlaw was the captain of the Hannah Boden in October 1991 when Andrea Gail sank in the Atlantic in the 1991 Perfect Storm. Greenlaw's efforts to warn the Andrea Gail about the impending storm were portrayed in Sebastian Junger's 1997 book The Perfect Storm and in the movie version, in which she was played by Mary Elizabeth Mastrantonio. Junger called Greenlaw not just the only female swordfishing captain, but "one of the best captains, period, on the entire East Coast."

In 1997, Greenlaw settled in Isle au Haut, and bought a lobster boat, the 35-foot Mattie Belle.

On May 28, 2009, Greenlaw was convicted of illegally entering and illegally fishing in Canadian waters by the Provincial Court of Newfoundland and Labrador. The Crown asked for a fine of CAD$53,000, while the defense recommended a fine of half that amount. She was fined $38,000 after the judge found she did not use "due diligence".

=== Writer ===
External videos
- Booknotes interview with Greenlaw on The Lobster Chronicles: Life On a Very Small Island, October 13, 2002, C-SPAN
- Presentation by Greenlaw on The Lobster Chronicles, November 24, 2002, C-SPAN

Greenlaw's first book, The Hungry Ocean (1999), described a one-month swordfishing voyage, entailing, "among other things, treacherous weather, uncooperative fish, wildly entertaining shipmates, and the exhausting, mind-bending pressure of ten consecutive 21-hour days." Subsequent books include The Lobster Chronicles: Life on a Very Small Island (2002), All Fishermen Are Liars: True Tales from the Dry Dock Bar (2004), Seaworthy: A Swordboat Captain Returns to the Sea (2010), and Lifesaving Lessons: Notes from an Accidental Mother (2013). Greenlaw has co-authored two cookbooks with her mother, Martha Greenlaw, and published four novels of detective fiction—Slipknot (2007), Fisherman's Bend (2008), Shiver Hitch (2017) and Bimini Twist (2018) — all the names of knots and featuring her fictional detective Jane Bunker.

=== TV ===
Greenlaw joined season 19 of Deadliest Catch, where she attempted to enter the Alaskan crab fishery for the first time in her career.

Greenlaw also was on Discovery's Swords Life on the Line that spanned for three seasons where she Captained the Seahawk, Bjorn II, and the Hannah Boden.

== Awards ==
Greenlaw was the winner of the American Library Association's Alex Award in 2000, United States Maritime Literature Award in 2003, and the New England Book Award for nonfiction in 2004.

== Bibliography ==
=== Cookbooks ===
- Greenlaw, Linda; Greenlaw, Martha (2005). Recipes from a Very Small Island. Hyperion. ISBN 1401300731.
- Greenlaw, Linda; Greenlaw, Martha (2011). The Maine Summers Cookbook: Recipes for Delicious, Sun-Filled Days. Studio. ISBN 978-0670022854.

=== Maritime ===
- Greenlaw, Linda (1999). The Hungry Ocean: A Swordboat Captain's Journey. Hyperion. ISBN 0786885416.
- Greenlaw, Linda (2002). The Lobster Chronicles: Life on a Very Small Island. Hyperion. ISBN 0786885912.
- Greenlaw, Linda (2004). All Fishermen Are Liars: True Tales from the Dry Dock Bar. Hyperion. ISBN 0786888784.
- Greenlaw, Linda (2010). Seaworthy: A Swordboat Captain Returns to the Sea. Viking Adult. ISBN 978-0670021925.

=== Memoir ===
- Greenlaw, Linda (2013). Lifesaving Lessons: Notes from an Accidental Mother. Viking Adult. ISBN 978-0670025176.

=== Mystery ===
- Greenlaw, Linda (2007). Slipknot. Jane Bunker Mystery #1. Hyperion. ISBN 978-0786866786.
- Greenlaw, Linda (2008). Fisherman's Bend. Jane Bunker Mystery #2. Hyperion. ISBN 978-1401322359.
- Greenlaw, Linda (2017). Shiver Hitch. Jane Bunker Mystery #3. St. Martin's Press. ISBN 978-1250181541.
- Greenlaw, Linda (2018). Bimini Twist. Jane Bunker Mystery #4. Minotaur Books. ISBN 978-1250107589.
