= No Name Storm =

No Name Storm may refer to:

- 1991 Perfect Storm, a nor'easter that transitioned into a tropical storm and ultimately strengthened into an unnamed hurricane off the Atlantic coast of the United States
- 1993 Storm of the Century, an extratropical cyclonic storm that formed over the Gulf of Mexico then moved through the eastern United States before moving into eastern Canada
