= Storm of the Century (disambiguation) =

The Storm of the century is a term usually applied to a particularly damaging or notable weather event (such as a blizzard or hurricane) during a specific century. It may refer to:

== Weather events ==
- 1935 Labor Day hurricane
- Great Appalachian Storm of 1950
- Eastern Canadian blizzard of March 1971
- 1991 Perfect Storm
- 1993 Storm of the Century, a powerful superstorm/nor'easter that impacted that Eastern United States

== Screenplay ==
- Storm of the Century, 1999 horror TV miniseries written by Stephen King

== See also ==
- Superstorm
