= Rugged Water =

1925 film

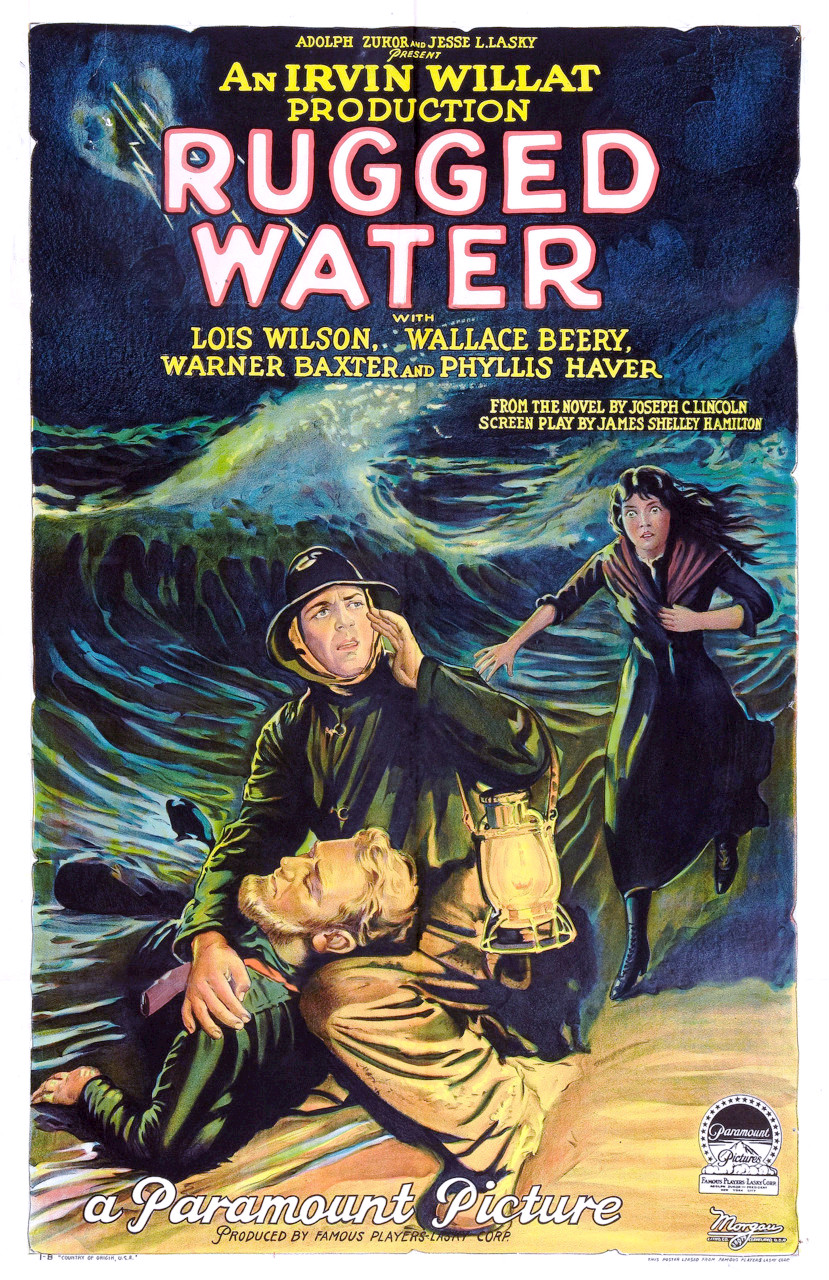
- Film poster
- Directed by: Irvin Willat
- Screenplay by: James Shelley Hamilton
- Based on: novel by Joseph C. Lincoln
- Produced by: Jesse L. Lasky; Adolph Zukor
- Starring: Lois Wilson; Wallace Beery; Warner Baxter; Phyllis Haver; Dot Farley; J. P. Lockney; James Mason; Willard Cooley
- Cinematography: Alfred Gilks
- Production company: Famous Players–Lasky Corporation
- Distributed by: Paramount Pictures
- Release date: August 17, 1925
- Running time: 60 minutes
- Country: United States
- Language: Silent (English intertitles)

Rugged Water is a 1925 American silent drama film directed by Irvin Willat and written by James Shelley Hamilton and Joseph C. Lincoln. The film stars Lois Wilson, Wallace Beery, Warner Baxter, Phyllis Haver, Dot Farley, J. P. Lockney, James Mason, and Willard Cooley. The film was released on August 17, 1925, by Paramount Pictures.

== Plot ==
Calvin Homer works for the U.S. Life-Saving Service in Setauket on Cape Cod in Massachusetts; he is the second in command at that station. He is engaged to Myra Fuller, who manipulated him into a marriage proposal.

When the station chief retires, Calvin expects to get his job. However, the appointment goes instead to Benoni Bartlett, an employee from a different station. He was known as the hero of a dangerous rescue at that station that cost the lives of his fellow crew members. Benoni has a reputation for religious fanaticism and antagonistic behavior.

Calvin is ready to quite, but Bartlett's daughter Norma convinces Homer to stay . Soon a romance springs up between them. Fuller then breaks their engagement.

A call comes in from a vessel in distress in a violent storm. A fearful Benoni refuses to go out with a boat to rescue the vessel. Unwilling to accept that, Calvin takes the boat out with a crew and rescues the people on the boat.

For his lack of action, the Life Saving service fires Benoni and replaces him with Calvin. Driven insane by his job loss, Benoni takes a small boat out into the rough water, to be rescued by Calvin. Benoni dies from hypotermia. Realizing that Calvin was not responsible for her father's disgrace, Norma continues her relationship with him.

== Cast ==
- Lois Wilson as Norma Bartlett
- Wallace Beery as Capt. Bartlett
- Warner Baxter as Calvin Horner
- Phyllis Haver as Myra Fuller
- Dot Farley as Mrs. Fuller
- J. P. Lockney as Supt. Lockney
- James Mason as Wally Oakes
- Willard Cooley as Sam Bearse
- Walter Ackerman as Cook
- Knute Erickson as Jarvis
- Thomas Delmar as Gammon
- Jack Byron as Orrin Hendricks
- Walter Rodgers as Bloomer
- Warren Rogers as Josh Phinney

== Preservation ==
Rugged Water is currently presumed lost. In February of 2021, the film was cited by the National Film Preservation Board on their Lost U.S. Silent Feature Films list.

== See also ==
- Godless Men (1920)
- Stormswept (1923)
- Code of the Sea (1924)
- Sensation Seekers (1927)
- The Perfect Storm (2000)
