= Stormswept =

1923 film by Robert Thornby

- Promotional poster for Stormswept
- Directed by: Robert Thornby
- Written by: Winifred Dunn; H.H. Van Loan (story)
- Starring: Wallace Beery; Noah Beery
- Cinematography: Ben F. Reynolds
- Distributed by: Film Booking Offices of America (FBO)
- Release date: February 18, 1923
- Running time: 5 reels
- Country: United States
- Language: Silent (English intertitles)

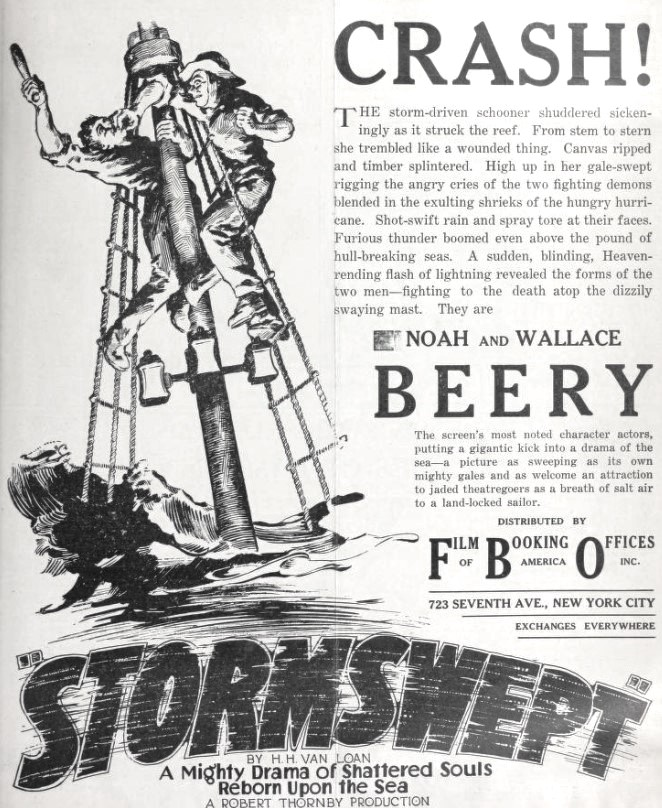
1923 magazine ad

Stormswept is a 1923 silent film starring brothers Wallace Beery and Noah Beery. The advertising phrase used for the movie was "Wallace and Noah Beery, The Two Greatest Character Actors on the American Screen." The film was written by Winifred Dunn from the H. H. Van Loan story, and directed by Robert Thornby.

== Plot ==
As described in a film magazine, William McCabe is a bitter man seeking solitude. He wants to forget his wife Hedda, who betrayed him. While wandering around the waterfront, considering suicide, he rescues a man falling from the dock. McCabe becomes friends with the rescued man. He is Shark Moran, the captain of the lightship Relief. Learning that McCabe wants solitude, Moran suggests he join his crew. Referred to the sea, Moran tells him. "You will find solitude there,"

While at sea on the lightship, McCabe meets and falls in love with Ann Reynolds, the daughter of the tug captain who supplies them. However, McCabe is unsettled over these feelings because he is still married to Hedda.

One day, the crew spots a small boat occupied by a young woman drifting near the lightship. Moran bringst the woman aboard the Relief and makes unwanted sexual advances towards her. McCabe realizes the woman is Hedda and fights Moran to stop him. Once Moran realizes Hedda's identity, he apologizes to McCabe and the two men end their dispute. After reaching dock, Hedda goes ashore and McCabe feels free to pursue Reynolds.

== Cast ==
- Wallace Beery as William McCabe
- Noah Beery as Shark Moran
- Virginia Browne Faire as Ann Reynolds
- Arline Pretty as Hedda McCabe
- Jack Carlyle as Snape

== Production ==
Stormswept was filmed at the Butler Greenwood Plantation, an historic plantation in St. Francisville, Louisiana.

== Preservation ==
A complete print of Stormswept is held by the British Film Institute in London.

== See also ==
- Godless Men (1920)
- Code of the Sea (1924)
- Rugged Water (1925)
- Sensation Seekers (1927)
- The Perfect Storm (2000)
