= Godless Men =

1920 film directed by Reginald Barker

Gddless Men
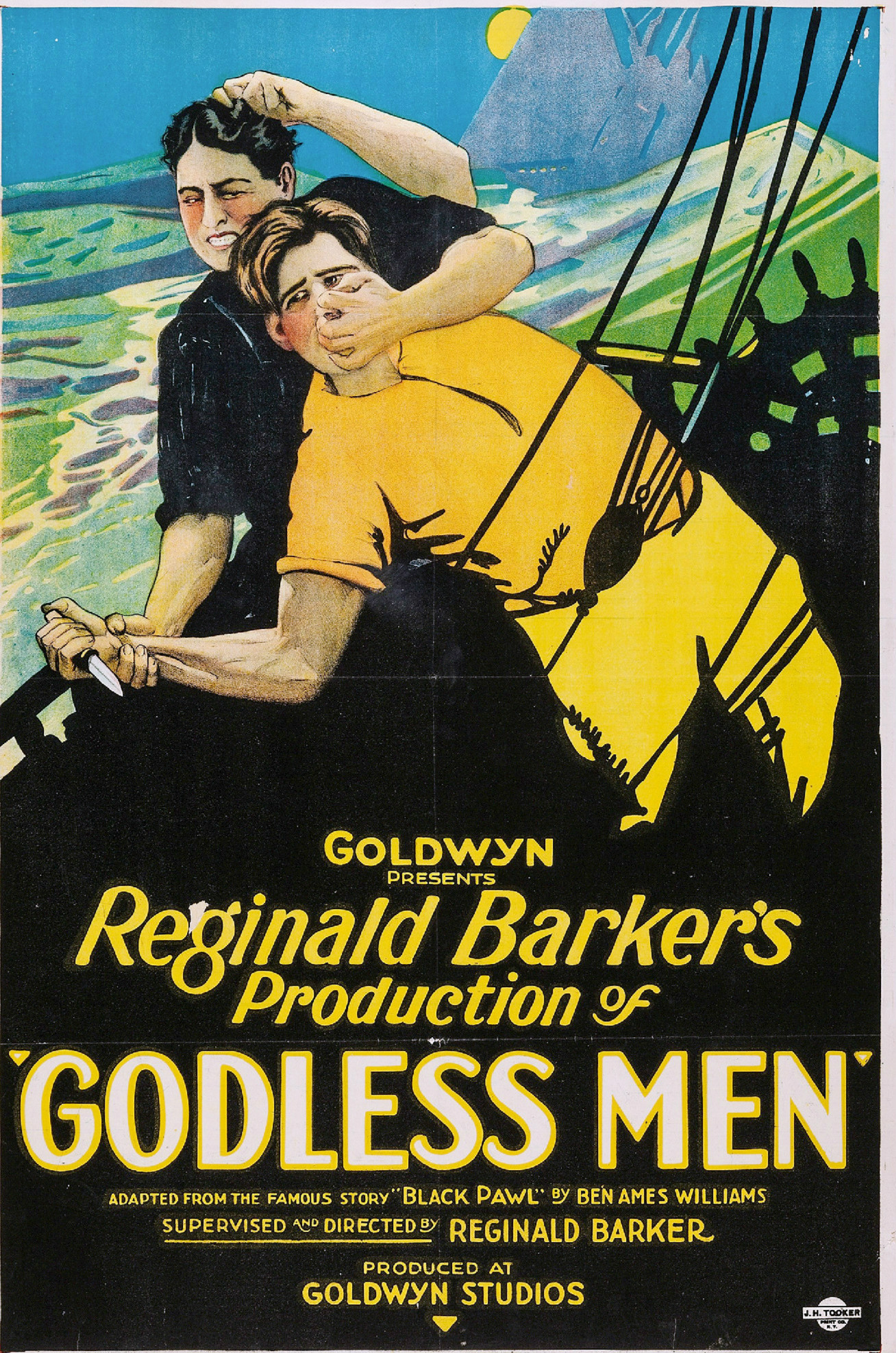
- Film poster
- Directed by: Reginald Barker
- Written by: J. G. Hawks (co-scenario); Edfrid A. Bingham (co-scenario)
- Based on: Black Pawl, Saturday Evening Post by Ben Ames Williams
- Starring: Russell Simpson; James "Jim" Mason
- Cinematography: Percy Hilburn (French)
- Edited by: J. G. Hawks
- Production company: Reginald Barker Productions
- Distributed by: Goldwyn Pictures
- Release date: November 1920
- Running time: 70 minutes
- Country: United States
- Language: Silent (English intertitles)

The full film

Godless Men is a 1920 American silent adventure drama film directed by Reginald Barker and produced and distributed by Goldwyn Pictures. It stars Russell Simpson and James "Jim" Mason as a father and son. It is based on a Saturday Evening Post short story "Black Pawl" by Ben Ames Williams.

This film exists in a private collection.

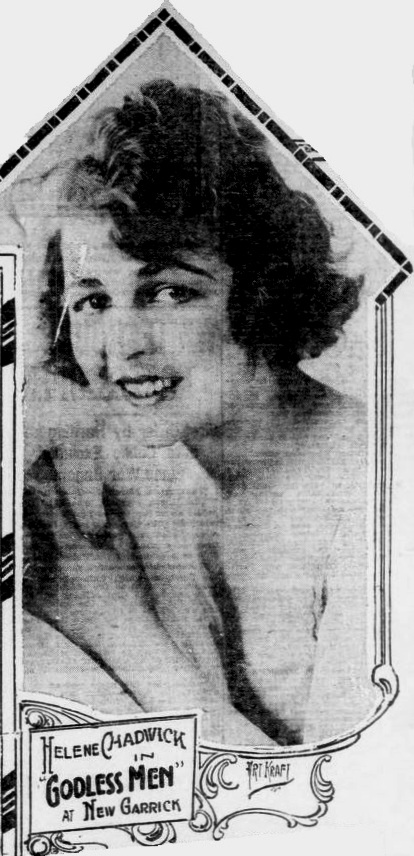
Newspaper ad for film with Helene Chadwick

== Cast ==
- Russell Simpson as 'Black' Pawl
- James "Jim" Mason as 'Red' Pawl
- Helene Chadwick as Ruth Lytton
- John Bowers as Dan Darrin
- Alec B. Francis as Reverend Sam Poor
- Bob Kortman as Seaman Speiss
- Irene Rich as 'Black Pawl's' Wife
- Lionel Belmore as Seaman Neighbor
- Frankie Lee as 'Red Pawl' as a Boy (uncredited)
- Guinn "Big Boy" Williams as Seaman (uncredited)

== See also ==
- Stormswept (1923)
- Code of the Sea (1924)
- Rugged Water (1925)
- Sensation Seekers (1927)
- The Perfect Storm (2000)
