= Robert Case =

American meteorologist (1939–2008)

Robert "Bob" Case
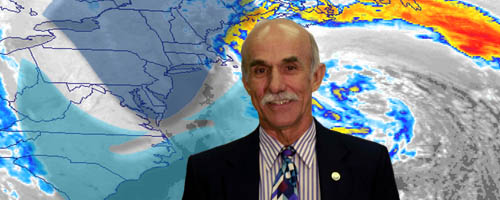
- Born: Robert Allen Case; December 16, 1939
- Died: June 19, 2008 (aged 68); Lewistown, Pennsylvania, US
- Education: Pennsylvania State University
- Occupation: Meteorologist
- Years active: 1967–1995
- Employer: National Weather Service
- Known for: Inspiring the name "Perfect Storm"

Robert Allen "Bob" Case (December 16, 1939 – June 19, 2008) was a meteorologist who worked for the National Weather Service (NWS) for 28 years. Over the course of his career, he worked in NWS various offices, developing a diverse background in various types of weather forecasting, including a lengthy stint as a hurricane forecaster. He is best known for inspiring the naming of the 1991 Perfect Storm as The Perfect Storm.

== Career ==
Robert Case entered the United States Navy at the age of 17 in 1957, and served for 3½ years. Thereafter, he went to college, and earned a Bachelor's degree in math/physics from Lock Haven University in Pennsylvania in 1965. During 1966, he took meteorology courses at the Pennsylvania State University (Penn State). By 1967, he had joined the National Weather Service, and was posted to Anchorage, Alaska. The following year, he moved to Juneau, Alaska.

In 1971, Case began work at NWS Headquarters near Washington, D. C. The next year he completed coursework for his Master's degree from Penn State. In 1973, he worked again in Juneau, this time remaining there for two years. Then, in 1975, he filled the position of a marine and aviation forecaster in Coral Gables, Florida. He was promoted to a lead forecaster in 1980.

In 1982, Case began working at the National Hurricane Center. In 1990, he became a manager as the deputy meteorologist-in-charge in Boston, Massachusetts. While in Boston, during an interview with author Sebastian Junger, Case described the unusual combination of weather conditions off the New England and Atlantic Canada coast at the end of October, 1991, as being "perfect" for the creation of the immensely powerful ocean storm that ensued. Keying in on Case's use of the adjective perfect, Junger coined the phrase The Perfect Storm as the title of his book about the storm.

In 1993, Case became the meteorologist-in-charge at State College, Pennsylvania. He held that position two years before retiring from the NWS in 1995. Case then settled in the town of Lewistown, Pennsylvania, where he occasionally taught school. In the latter years of his life, Case suffered from the effects of amyotrophic lateral sclerosis. He died peacefully in his sleep on June 19, 2008, at his home.

== Awards ==
Bob received an award for meritorious service during Hurricane Gilbert in 1989.
