= Code of the Sea =

1924 film by Victor Fleming

- Theatrical poster
- Directed by: Victor Fleming
- Written by: Bertram Millhauser (scenario)
- Story by: Byron Morgan
- Produced by: Adolph Zukor; Jesse Lasky
- Starring: Rod La Rocque; Jacqueline Logan
- Cinematography: Charles Schoenbaum (as C. Edgar Schoenbaum)
- Distributed by: Paramount Pictures
- Release date: June 2, 1924
- Running time: 6 reels (1,840.38 meters)
- Country: United States
- Language: Silent (English intertitles)

Reel 4 of the film

Code of the Sea is a 1924 American silent drama film produced by Famous Players–Lasky and distributed by Paramount Pictures. It was directed by Victor Fleming and starred Rod La Rocque and Jacqueline Logan.

== Cast ==
- Rod La Rocque as Bruce McDow
- Jacqueline Logan as Jenny Hayden
- George Fawcett as Captain Hayden
- Maurice Bennett Flynn as Ewart Radcliff (credited as Maurice 'Lefty' Flynn)
- Luke Cosgrove as Captain Jonas
- Lillian Leighton as Mrs. McDow
- Sam Appel as John Swayne
- Charles Ogle as Superintendent Beasley

== Preservation ==
Prints of Code of the Sea survive in the Library of Congress collection as well as George Eastman House and UCLA Film and Television Archive.

== See also ==
- Godless Men (1920)
- Stormswept (1923)
- Rugged Water (1925)
- Sensation Seekers (1927)
- The Perfect Storm (2000)
