= Flemish Cap =

Undersea landform east of Newfoundland

Coordinates: 47°N 45°W

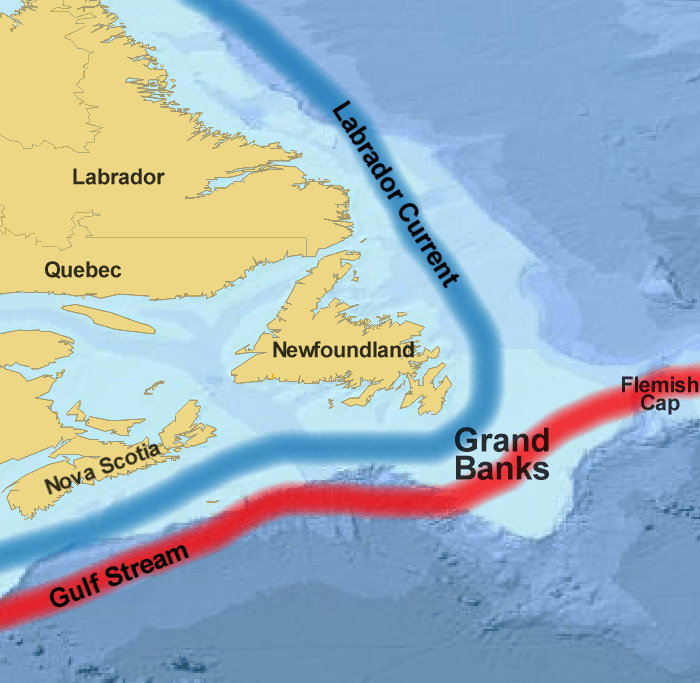
Map showing the Flemish Cap at far right

The Flemish Cap is an area of shallow waters in the north Atlantic Ocean centered roughly at 47° north, 45° west or about 563 km (350 miles) east of St. John's, Newfoundland and Labrador.

The shallow water is caused by a wide underwater plateau covering an extended area of 42,000 km^{2} (12,000 square miles). Depths at the cap range from approximately 122 m (400 feet) to 700 m (2,300 feet).

The Flemish Cap is located within an area of transition between the cold waters of the Labrador Current and warmer waters influenced by the Gulf Stream. The mixing of the warmer and colder waters over the plateau produces the characteristic clockwise circulation current over the cap.

The waters of the Flemish Cap are deeper and warmer than the Grand Banks of Newfoundland. The 58,000-square-kilometre area may have served as an important refuge for marine species during the last ice age.

The Flemish Cap lies outside Canada's 200 nautical mile (370 km) Exclusive Economic Zone established in 1977, and is therefore in international fishing waters. Overfishing became a serious issue in the latter 20th and early 21st centuries. Cod are particularly threatened here, as are American plaice, and the numbers of redfish have shown such significant decline as to be classified endangered.

During the last decade of the 20th century and the beginning part of the 21st century, Canada made an effort to prevent overfishing in the region by use of provisions of the Coastal Fisheries Protection Act and the United Nations Fish Stocks Agreement.

According to early written accounts dating back to 1607, the Flemish Cap's name is a reminder that fishermen from Flanders were once active in the area.

== Film ==
This area was referenced by Wolfgang Petersen in his 2000 film The Perfect Storm as the final fishing grounds of Andrea Gail, captained by Billy Tyne (George Clooney). Swordfish was their primary catch.
