= Andrea Gail =

Fishing vessel lost at sea

History

United States
- Name: Miss Penny; Andrea Gail
- Owner: Sea Gale Corp., Gloucester, Massachusetts
- Port of registry: United States
- Route: Eastern Atlantic Ocean
- Builder: Eastern Shipbuilding, Panama City, Florida
- Launched: 1977
- Completed: 1978
- In service: 1978
- Out of service: October 28, 1991
- Home port: Gloucester, Massachusetts
- Identification: 592898
- Fate: Lost at sea in the 1991 Perfect Storm

General characteristics
- Type: Fishing vessel
- Tonnage: 92 tons
- Length: 72 ft (22 m)
- Beam: 20 ft (6.1 m)
- Depth: 9.8 ft (3.0 m)
- Installed power: 365 hp (272 kW)
- Propulsion: Diesel marine engine (Caterpillar 3408 V8), single propeller. Additionally a Caterpillar 35 kW generator. Lister Petter 15 kW generator
- Speed: 12 knots (22 km/h; 14 mph)
- Crew: 6
- Notes: Sister ships: Hannah Boden, and FV Lady Grace

FV Andrea Gail was an American commercial fishing vessel that was lost at sea with all six crewmembers during the Perfect Storm of 1991. The vessel and her six-man crew had been fishing the North Atlantic Ocean out of Gloucester, Massachusetts. Her last reported position was 180 mi (290 km) northeast of Sable Island on October 28, 1991. The story of Andrea Gail and her crew was the basis of the 1997 book The Perfect Storm by Sebastian Junger, and a 2000 film adaptation of the same name.

== FV Andrea Gail ==
Andrea Gail was a 72-foot (22 m) commercial fishing vessel constructed in Panama City, Florida, in 1978, and owned by Robert Brown. Her home port was Gloucester, Massachusetts. She sailed from Gloucester, where she would offload her catch and reload food and stores for her next run.

Andrea Gail began her final voyage departing from Gloucester Harbor on September 20, 1991, bound for the Grand Banks of Newfoundland off the coast of eastern Canada. After poor fishing, Captain Frank W. "Billy" Tyne Jr. headed east to the Flemish Cap, where he believed they would have better luck. Despite weather reports warning of dangerous conditions, Tyne set course for home on October 26–27. The ship's ice machine was malfunctioning and would not have been able to maintain the catch for much longer.

=== Disappearance ===
The last reported transmission from Andrea Gail was at about 6:00 pm on October 28, 1991. Tyne radioed Linda Greenlaw, captain of the F/V Hannah Boden, owned by the same company, and gave his coordinates as 44°00′N 56°40′W, or about 162 miles (261 km) east of Sable Island. He also gave a weather report indicating 30-foot (9.1 m) seas and wind gusts up to 80 knots (150 km/h; 92 mph). Tyne's final recorded words were, "She's comin' on, boys, and she's comin' on strong." Junger reported that the storm created waves in excess of 100 ft (30 m) in height. Data from a series of weather buoys in the general vicinity of the vessel's last known location recorded peak wave action exceeding 60 ft (18 m) in height from October 28 through 30, 1991. However, a buoy off the coast of Nova Scotia reported a wave height of 100.7 ft (30.7 m), the highest ever recorded in the province's offshore waters proving Junger correct.

=== Search ===
On October 30, 1991, the vessel was reported overdue. An extensive air and land search was launched by the 106th Rescue Wing from the New York Air National Guard, United States Navy, United States Coast Guard and Canadian Coast Guard forces. The search eventually covered over 186,000 square nautical miles (640,000 km^{2}).

On November 6, 1991, Andrea Gail's emergency position-indicating radio beacon (EPIRB) was discovered washed up on the shore of Sable Island in Nova Scotia. The EPIRB was designed to automatically send out a distress signal upon contact with sea water, but the Canadian Coast Guard personnel who found the beacon "did not conclusively verify whether the control switch was in the on or off position". Authorities called off the search for the missing vessel on November 9, 1991, due to the low probability of crew survival. All six of the crew were lost at sea; no bodies were recovered.

== In media ==
- The story of Andrea Gail and her crew inspired Sebastian Junger's 1997 book, The Perfect Storm, and a 2000 film of the same name. The sister ship of Andrea Gail, FV Lady Grace, was used during the filming of the movie.
- A model of Andrea Gail built by Paul Gran is on display at the Cape Ann Museum in Gloucester, Massachusetts.
- An unsuccessful search for the wreck of Andrea Gail somewhere along the continental shelf near Sable Island, was the subject of an episode of The Sea Hunters with Clive Cussler.
