= USCGC Tamaroa (WMEC-166) =

Coast guard cutter

Coordinates: 38.5191°N 74.5125°W

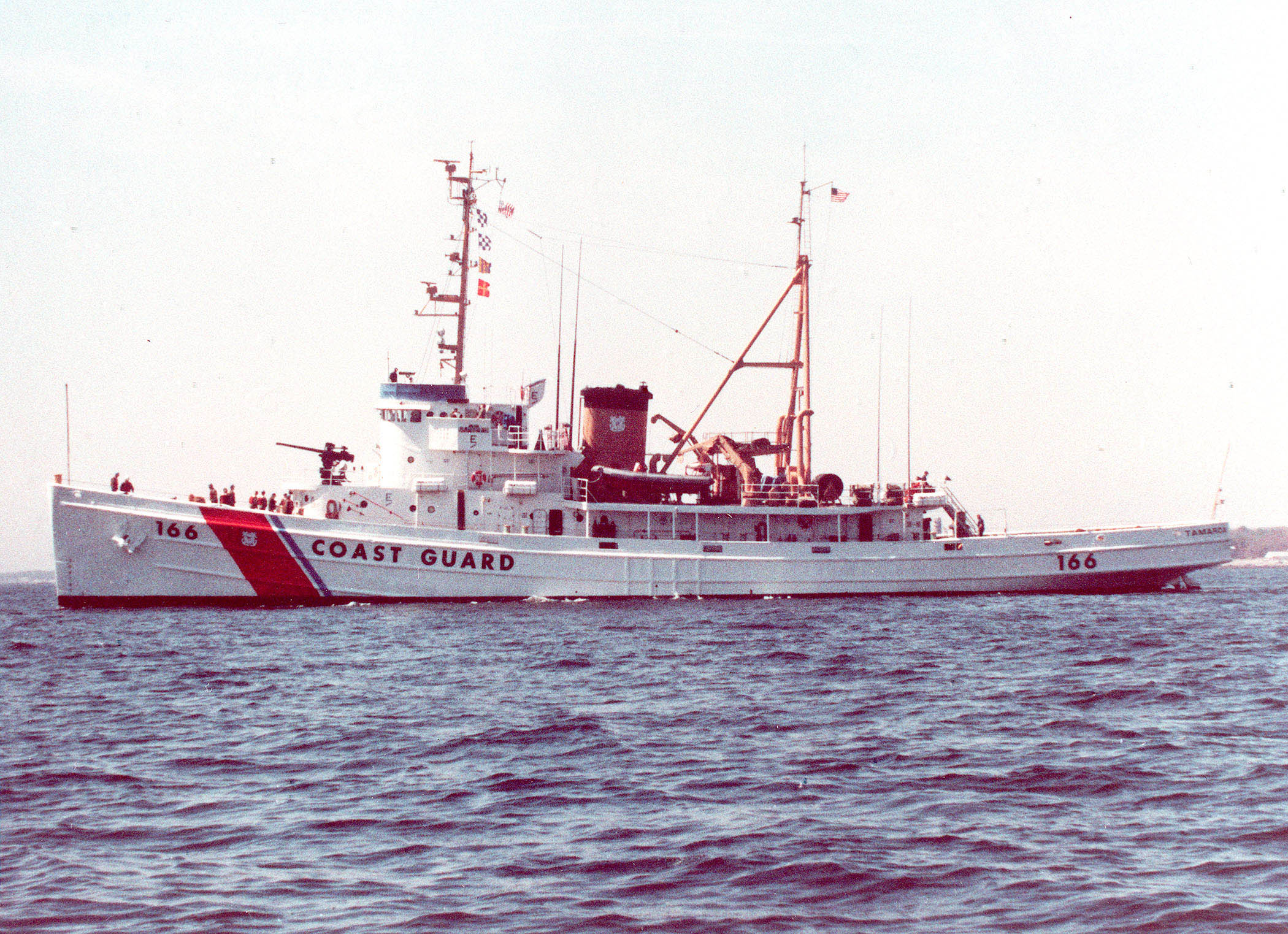
- USCGC Tamaroa (WMEC-166) in 1990, formerly USS Zuni (ATF-95) fleet tug (in 1943).

History

United States Navy
- Name: USS Zuni (ATF-95)
- Builder: Commercial Iron Works
- Laid down: 8 March 1943
- Launched: 31 July 1943
- Commissioned: 9 October 1943
- Decommissioned: 29 June 1946
- Stricken: 19 July 1946
- Nickname(s): "The Mighty Z"
- Fate: Transferred to US Coast Guard

United States Coast Guard
- Name: USCGC Tamaroa (WAT-166) (1946 - 1956); USCGC Tamaroa (WATF-166) (1956 - 1966); USCGC Tamaroa (WMEC-166)
- Commissioned: 29 June 1946
- Decommissioned: 1 February 1994
- Fate: Scuttled 10 May 2017, 33 nautical miles off coast of Cape May, New Jersey

General characteristics
- Class & type: Cherokee-class tugboat
- Displacement: 1,731 long tons (1,759 t)
- Length: 205 ft 6 in (62.64 m)
- Beam: 39 ft 3.25 in (11.9698 m)
- Draft: 18 ft (5.5 m)
- Propulsion: 4 × General Motors model 12-278 diesels with diesel-electric drive: 3,010 shp (2,240 kW)
- Speed: 16.1 kn (29.8 km/h; 18.5 mph) maximum; 8.0 kn (14.8 km/h; 9.2 mph) economical
- Range: 15,000 nmi (28,000 km; 17,000 mi) at 8 kn (15 km/h; 9.2 mph) (1990)
- Complement: 10 officers, 74 enlisted (1990)
- Sensors & processing systems: Radar: SPN-25 (1961); no sonar.
- Armament: WWII: 1 × 3"/50 caliber gun; 2 × twin 40 mm guns; 2 × 20 mm guns; 1990: 1 × 3"/50 caliber gun

USCGC Tamaroa (WAT/WMEC-166), originally the United States Navy Cherokee-class fleet tug USS Zuni (ATF-95), was a United States Coast Guard cutter. Following the U.S. Coast Guard custom of naming cutters in this class of ship after Native American tribes, she was named after the Tamaroa tribe of the Illiniwek tribal group.

== Construction and U.S. Navy operational history ==
The ship was one of 70 of her class built for the U.S. Navy. As the fleet tug USS Zuni, she saw action in World War II, including in the Marianas, Philippines, and Iwo Jima operations. After the war, she was transferred to the U.S. Coast Guard in 1946.

== U.S. Coast Guard operational history ==
The bulk of Tamaroa′s U.S. Coast Guard career was spent patrolling, working in drug interdiction, and fisheries protection. She was the first Coast Guard cutter to arrive at the sinking ocean liner Andrea Doria in 1956.

Tamaroa was involved in the landmark 1969 tort case, Ira S. Bushey & Sons, Inc. v. United States, 398 F.2d 167 (2d Cir. 1968), which held the United States vicariously liable for the damage caused by Tamaroa to a drydock after an intoxicated U.S. Coast Guard seaman returning to his bunk aboard Tamaroa on 14 March 1963 opened drydock water valves, flooding and sinking the drydock and causing Tamaroa to list and slide off her blocks. In its ruling, the court found that an employer (in this case, the United States Government) will be held liable under respondeat superior if the actions of the employee (in this, a U.S. Coast Guard seaman) arise out of the course of his or her employment (in this case, as a U.S. Coast Guard seaman returning to his ship after leave) and cause damage (in this case, to Bushey & Sons′ drydock). The court held that "the ship is liable for anything ship-connected persons cause it to do."

Tamaroa is perhaps most famous for a rescue described in the 1997 book The Perfect Storm (by Sebastian Junger) and depicted in the 2000 movie The Perfect Storm; on October 31, 1991, Tamaroa (led by Commander Lawrence Brudnicki) had been attempting to rescue the crew of the sailing vessel Satori the previous day when the cutter was diverted to assist the Air National Guard aircrew, she rescued four out of the five crewmen of a downed New York Air National Guard helicopter. The fifth aircrewman was presumed drowned; his body was never recovered.

== Decommissioning and disposal ==
After the Coast Guard decommissioned her in 1994, Tamaroa was donated to the Intrepid Sea-Air-Space Museum in New York City. She was noticed tied up next to the museum ship Intrepid in 1994 by a former crewman who began a campaign to restore her. After several unsuccessful attempts, the Zuni Maritime Foundation, a non-profit organization in Richmond, Virginia, formed. The foundation attempted to preserve the ship in an operational condition, and use her to educate the public. This ultimately proved unsuccessful.

Prior to scuttling, parts of the Tamaroa were removed by the Black Dog Salvage company for two episodes of the TV show "Salvage Dawgs". Her main mast was repurposed as a flagpole for the Ballast Point microbrewery in Roanoke, VA. Having been tied up in Norfolk, Virginia, and environmentally cleaned, she was selected in 2016 for use as an artificial reef. Her sinking, originally scheduled for 30 October 2016, was delayed by rough seas and related issues. She finally was scuttled at 13:00 on 10 May 2017 in the Atlantic Ocean about 33 nautical miles (61 km) from Cape May, New Jersey, at a depth of 120 feet, forming an artificial reef. Her wreck is now a recreational dive site, part of the Del-Jersey-Land Inshore Reef.

== Awards ==
- Coast Guard Unit Commendation with three stars
- Coast Guard Meritorious Unit Commendation with four stars
- Coast Guard "E" Ribbon with three stars
- Coast Guard Bicentennial Unit Commendation
- American Campaign Medal
- Asiatic-Pacific Campaign Medal with four battle stars
- World War II Victory Medal
- National Defense Service Medal with two stars
- Humanitarian Service Medal with three stars
- Coast Guard Special Operations Service Ribbon
- Philippine Liberation Medal
