= The Perfect Storm (film) =

2000 film

- Theatrical release poster
- Directed by: Wolfgang Petersen
- Screenplay by: William D. Wittliff
- Based on: The Perfect Storm by Sebastian Junger
- Produced by: Paula Weinstein; Wolfgang Petersen; Gail Katz
- Starring: George Clooney; Mark Wahlberg; Diane Lane; William Fichtner; Karen Allen; Bob Gunton; Mary Elizabeth Mastrantonio; John C. Reilly
- Cinematography: John Seale
- Edited by: Richard Francis-Bruce
- Music by: James Horner
- Production companies: Baltimore Spring Creek Pictures; Radiant Productions
- Distributed by: Warner Bros. Pictures
- Release date: June 30, 2000
- Running time: 130 minutes
- Country: United States
- Language: English
- Budget: $120–140 million
- Box office: $328.7 million

The Perfect Storm is a 2000 American disaster drama film directed by Wolfgang Petersen and based on the 1997 creative non-fiction book of the same name by Sebastian Junger. The film was adapted by William D. Wittliff, with an uncredited rewrite by Bo Goldman, and tells the story of Andrea Gail, a commercial fishing vessel that was lost at sea with all hands after being caught in the Perfect Storm of 1991. The film stars George Clooney, Mark Wahlberg, Diane Lane, William Fichtner, Karen Allen, Bob Gunton, Mary Elizabeth Mastrantonio, and John C. Reilly.

The Perfect Storm was released on June 30, 2000, by Warner Bros. Pictures. The film received mixed reviews. It grossed $328 million worldwide, becoming the eighth-highest-grossing film of 2000.

== Plot ==
In the Fall of 1991, the commercial swordfishing boat Andrea Gail returns to port in Gloucester, Massachusetts, with a poor catch; boat owner Bob Brown ridicules and taunts Captain Billy Tyne over his recent "cold streak."

Desperate to redeem himself, Billy convinces the Andrea Gail crew to join him for one more late-season fishing expedition. The crew heads out past their usual fishing grounds on the Grand Banks of Newfoundland in the North Atlantic, leaving a developing tropical storm behind them. Initially unsuccessful, they head to the Flemish Cap, where their luck greatly improves.

After amassing thousands of pounds of fish, the ice machine breaks down; the only way to sell their catch before it spoils is to hurry back to shore. However, between Andrea Gail and Gloucester is a confluence of two powerful weather fronts and a hurricane, which the crew underestimates.

As the crew of Andrea Gail battles the raging sea, and after repeated radio warnings from other ships, a strong wind breaks the ship's radio antenna just as Hurricane Grace and the northern weather front merge with each other atop them. Rookie fisherman Bobby Shatford attempts to fix it but is unsuccessful as the antenna breaks off and blows away into the sky. Shortly after, Captain Linda Greenlaw of sister ship Hannah Boden transmits a Mayday relay for Andrea Gail.

A New York Air National Guard HH-60 Pave Hawk rescue helicopter, which has rescued three crew members of the sailboat Mistral, responds, but after failing to perform a midair refueling with an HC-130 Hercules, the helicopter crew aborts the mission and ditches their aircraft. All but one of the Air National Guard crew members are rescued by a Coast Guard vessel, USCGC Tamaroa.

Andrea Gail endures various problems including 100-foot (30 m) waves crashing onto the deck, a broken stabilizer ramming the side of the ship with a loose anchor, and the crew members unsuccessfully boarding up broken windows. The ship struggles to sail through hurricane force winds and thunderous roaring, and her dewatering pumps, unable to keep up getting the water out of the ship, while friends and family worry and wait for news. Billy makes the decision to turn the boat around and is successful.

However, after initially seeing the eye of the storm, when the sun breaks, the storm turns its direction towards the boat, and the vessel encounters an enormous rogue wave. The crew attempt to drive the boat over the wave, but the wall of water crests before she can get to the top and is overturned. Billy elects to go down with his boat, the rest of the crew are trapped inside the living quarters, and only one, Bobby, manages to get out; he surfaces and watches as Andrea Gail rights herself before sinking stern-first into the depths. Knowing he has no chance of survival, Bobby silently imagines comforting his girlfriend as the waves carry him away into the darkness.

A search finds no survivors; Linda reads the eulogy at the memorial. Christina comforts Bobby's mother by recalling a dream she had of him smiling at her. As Linda heads out to sea again, she remembers Billy soliloquizing about what it means to be a sword boat captain.

== Cast ==
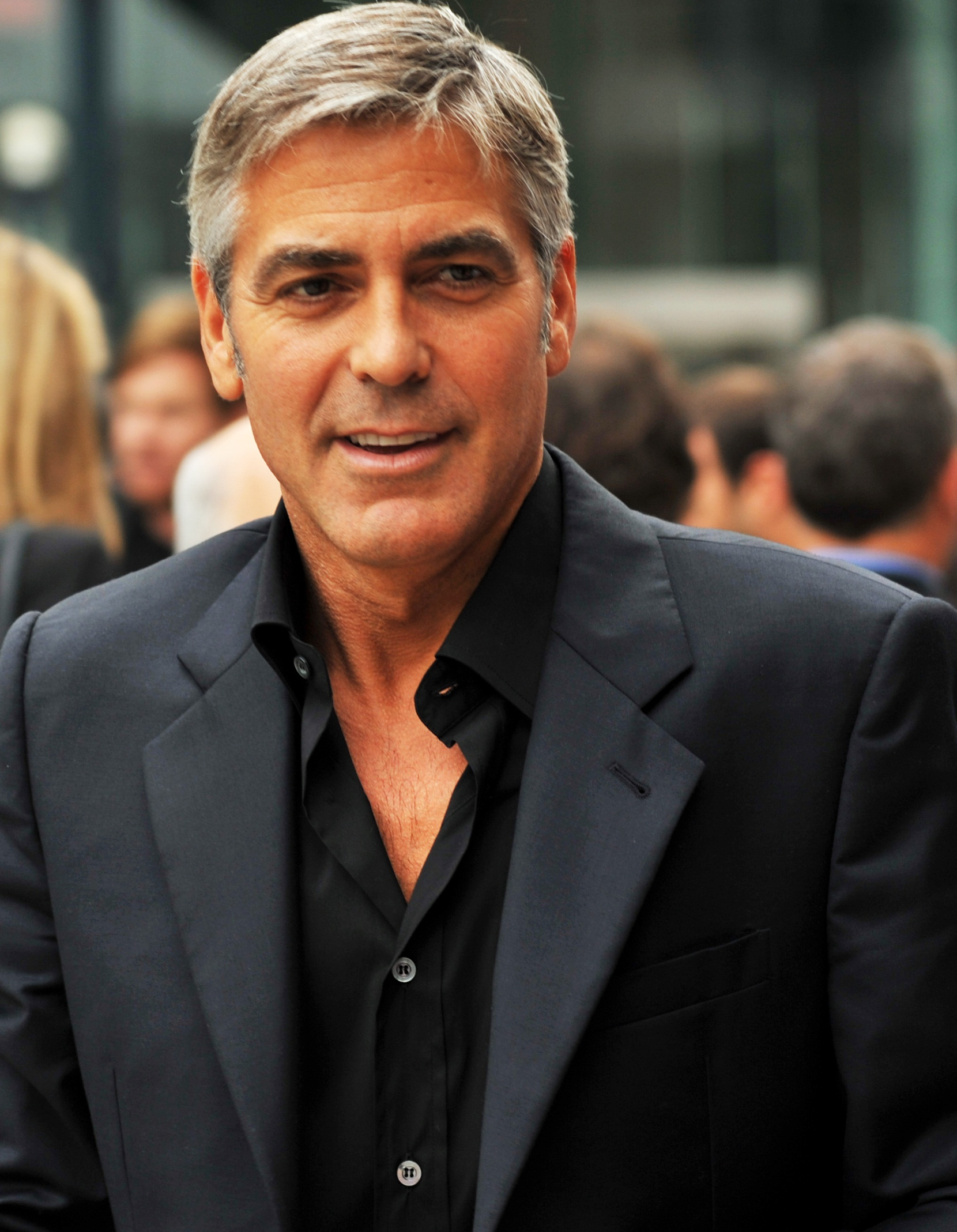
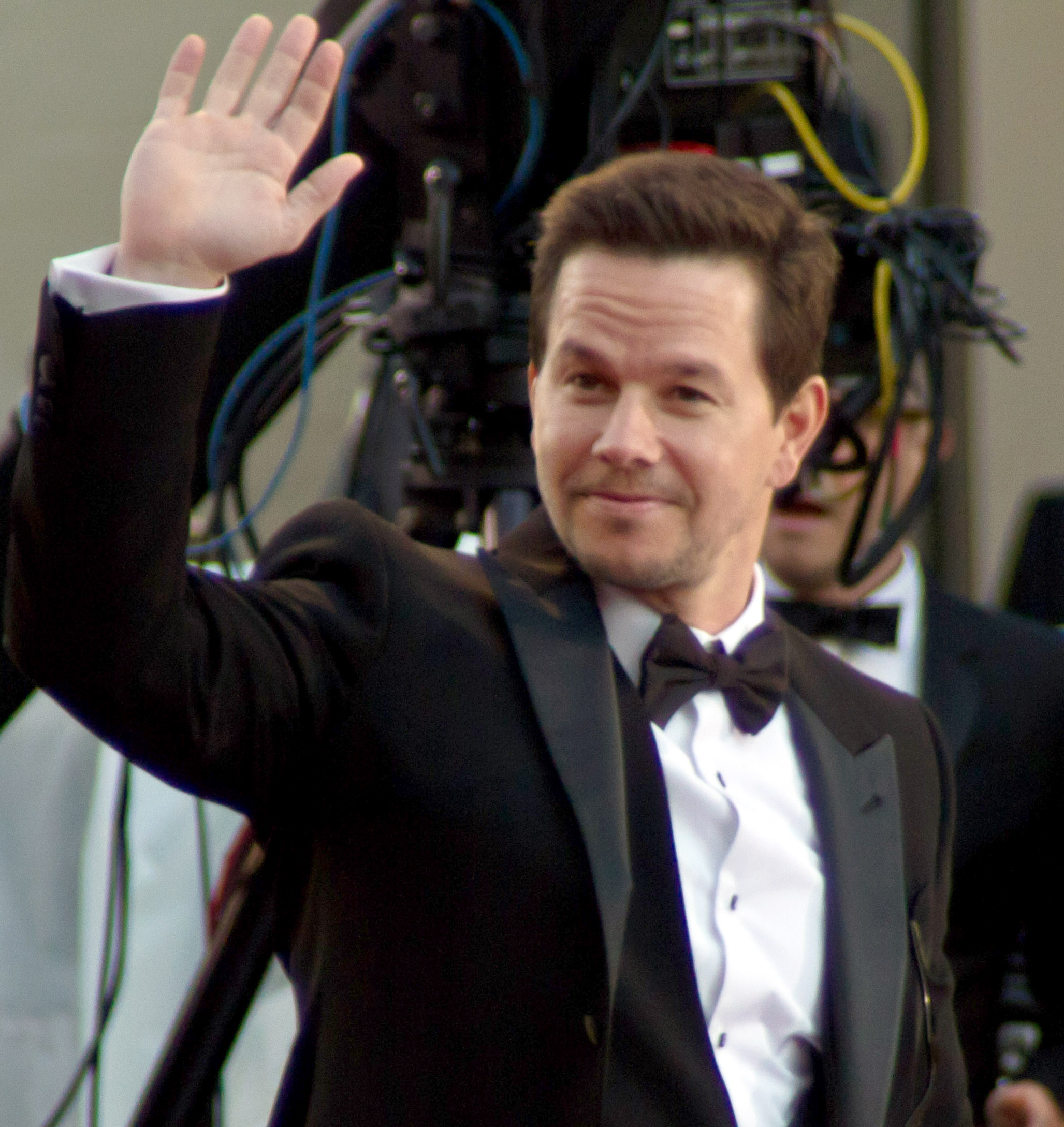
George Clooney (left) and Mark Wahlberg, who play the lead roles in the film
- George Clooney as Frank William "Billy" Tyne Jr., captain of Andrea Gail, a swordfishing boat. Billy is a divorced father of two daughters, who is determined to undertake one last fishing trip before the end of the season to make up for a recent string of poor catches.
- Mark Wahlberg as Robert "Bobby" Shatford, the least experienced of the crew of Andrea Gail. Bobby is the son of Ethel Shatford, the owner of the Crow's Nest, and boyfriend to Chris Cotter. He enjoys commercial fishing, but his deepening relationship with Chris (coupled with her reluctance to let him sail again) creates conflict within himself and between the couple. Yet, he is compelled by the potential to earn more money at sea than he could make with a job on shore to sign on for one last trip.
- John C. Reilly as Dale "Murph" Murphy, crewmember on Andrea Gail. Murph is a veteran fisherman who is divorced with a son with whom he's very involved. Murph has a rocky relationship with crewmember David "Sully" Sullivan.
- Diane Lane as Christina "Chris" Cotter, girlfriend of Bobby Shatford. She does not want Bobby to go on the trip because of a bad feeling she has about it. She spends her time during the last fishing trip decorating an apartment she has rented as a surprise for Bobby to symbolize her commitment to him.
- William Fichtner as David "Sully" Sullivan, crewmember on Andrea Gail. He signed on to replace crew member Douglas "Dougie" Kosco, who gave up his site after the last trip. Sully and Murph initially have an antagonistic relationship that is fueled in part by Sully's past involvement with Murph's ex-wife.
- John Hawkes as Michael "Bugsy" Moran, a member of Andrea Gail's crew. Bugsy's somewhat comic inability to connect with women appears to change on the eve of the trip, when he meets Irene, a divorced mother at the Crow's Nest.
- Allen Payne as Alfred Pierre, one of the crew of Andrea Gail.
- Mary Elizabeth Mastrantonio as Linda Greenlaw, the captain of Hannah Boden. Linda and Billy both captain ships for the same owner and maintain a friendly rivalry. She is concerned about Billy and his crew's going out in what she considers dangerous weather. Linda is the last to speak to Andrea Gail.
- Karen Allen as Melissa Brown, crewmember on Mistral.
- Bob Gunton as Alexander McAnally III, owner of Mistral, a yacht caught in the storm.
- Christopher McDonald as Todd Gross, a Boston meteorologist working for the WNEV-TV (the present day WHDH-TV).
- Dash Mihok as Sergeant Jeremy Mitchell, a pararescueman on the New York Air National Guard rescue helicopter.
- Josh Hopkins as Captain Darryl Ennis.
- Michael Ironside as Bob Brown, owner of Andrea Gail and Hannah Boden. Although Brown seems to harbor a deep-seated recognition of Tyne's skills at catching fish, he nevertheless pressures Tyne over the latter's recent inability to bring in larger hauls, resulting in an uneasy relationship between the two.
- Cherry Jones as Edie Bailey, crewmember on Mistral.
- Rusty Schwimmer as Irene “Big Red” Johnson, a divorced mother of two children.
- Janet Wright as Ethel Shatford, Bobby's mother, who supports his relationship with Christina.
- Todd Kimsey as Lieutenant Rob Pettit.

Other notable appearances include Joseph D. Reitman as Douglas Kosco and Sandy Ward as Quentin (The Old Timer), a retired fisherman.

== Production ==
Wolfgang Petersen asked Harrison Ford to play the lead role but Ford declined; his second choice was Nicolas Cage, who also turned it down, and Mel Gibson was offered the role but wanted too much money. Cage and Gibson went on to instead star in Gone in 60 Seconds and The Patriot respectively. As for Ford, he decided to focus on What Lies Beneath as his second choice.

The Perfect Storm marked the second collaboration between Mark Wahlberg and George Clooney, after Three Kings. In June 1999, it was officially announced that Diane Lane would be cast in the film as Bobby's girlfriend. The Perfect Storm was partially filmed in Gloucester, Massachusetts. A ship similar to Andrea Gail, Lady Grace, was used during the filming of the movie.

== Release ==
=== Home media ===
The Perfect Storm was released on DVD and VHS on November 14, 2000.

The film debuted on Blu-ray on July 22, 2008. A triple feature Blu-ray pack with The Perfect Storm, Twister, and Poseidon was released in January 2012.

== Reception ==
=== Box office ===
The Perfect Storm was a box office success. It achieved the third-highest number of theaters of any film upon its debut with a total of 3,407 locations, trailing only behind Mission: Impossible 2 and Scream 3. On its opening weekend, the film debuted with $41.3 million ahead of Sony's The Patriot. At the time, The Perfect Storm scored the third-highest Fourth of July opening weekend, after Independence Day and Men in Black. The film also had the second-highest opening weekend for a George Clooney film, behind Batman & Robin. Additionally, it beat Lethal Weapon 4 to secure the highest July opening weekend for a Warner Bros. film. In just ten days, it became the fastest Warner Bros. film to cross the $100 million mark domestically, only matched by both Batman and Batman Forever. It eventually brought in over $182.6 million in the United States, and $146.1 million around the world to a total of $328.7 million worldwide.

=== Critical response ===
On the review aggregator website Rotten Tomatoes, the film holds an approval rating of 47% based on 137 reviews, with an average rating of 5.6/10. The site's critics consensus reads: "While the special effects are well done and quite impressive, this film suffers a lack of any actual drama or characterization. The end result is a film that offers nifty eye-candy and nothing else." Metacritic assigned the film a weighted average score of 59 out of 100, based on 36 critics, indicating "mixed or average reviews". Audiences polled by CinemaScore gave the film an average grade of "B+" on an A+ to F scale.

The New York Times review was mixed: "This gusty oceanic epic...has lollapalooza special effects and gripping ensemble performances. But its quotient of human drama is finally too stingy for the personal stories of a group of New England fishermen battling "the storm of the century" to hit the emotional bull's-eye.... When in its final scenes the movie desperately tries to churn up some of the celestial schmaltz of Titanic, it is too little too late and feels obligatory despite the abundance of heart and chemistry that Mark Wahlberg and Diane Lane bring to their roles of a wildly-in-love young couple....Mr. Clooney conveys a darkly heroic gravity, but his lack of even a trace of New England accent makes him seem socially out of place in a cast whose other members get the regional dialect more or less right." Jay Carr of The Boston Globe wrote, "The Perfect Storm is much more than a seagoing Twister." Jeffrey Westhoff of Northwest Herald gave the film a rating of two out of four, saying, "Once the digital effects commence, The Perfect Storm has all the impact of watching a friend play Nintendo." Peter Bradshaw in The Guardian gave a mixed review, praising the cast but criticizing the effects and pacing. Among the film's more positive reviewers was Roger Ebert calling the film "a well-crafted example of a film of pure sensation" and giving it three and a half out of four.

=== Accolades ===
The film was nominated for two Academy Awards, Best Sound (John T. Reitz, Gregg Rudloff, David E. Campbell and Keith A. Wester), and Best Visual Effects (Walt Conti, Stefen Fangmeier, John Frazier and Habib Zargarpour) but lost both to Gladiator. It was also nominated for a Stinker Award for Most Intrusive Musical Score and the Saturn Awards for Best Action/Adventure/Thriller Film. For his work on both The Perfect Storm and How the Grinch Stole Christmas, James Horner would receive the award for Top Box Office Films at the ASCAP Film and Television Music Awards.

== Historical accuracy ==
Most of the names used were not changed for the film. Two lawsuits were later filed by certain families of the crew members of Andrea Gail. The only crew member lost from the New York Air National Guard HH-60 helicopter was TSgt. Arden "Rick" Smith; he is fictionalized as "Jonesy". The film differs in many ways from the book in regards to the fictionalization of the material.

=== The Andrea Gail ===
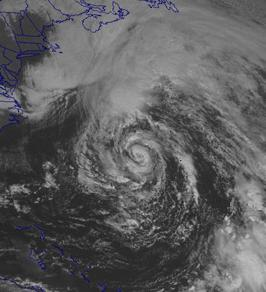
Hurricane Grace on October 28, 1991, when the Andrea Gail went missing.

The events depicted in the film after the Andrea Gail's last radio contact are pure speculation, as there were no survivors from the crew.

Contrary to the movie's storyline, Captain Linda Greenlaw says she did not place a distress call on behalf of Andrea Gail. "Without a distress call (directly) from the imperiled vessel, the Coast Guard will not initiate a search until the vessel is five days overdue in port," Greenlaw said. She had also been 600 miles east of the Andrea Gail when she went down (not west as depicted), and stated "They never indicated they were in trouble. They just never came back." The 1993 U.S. Coast Guard's investigative report said that Andrea Gail was experiencing 30-foot waves and winds from anywhere from 50 to 80 kn (58 to 92 mph) around the time of the last communication. The conditions, though threatening, were probably not unfamiliar to Tyne, who had been a successful fisherman for about a decade on other vessels, taking trips to the Grand Banks and fishing off Florida, the Carolinas, and elsewhere. The investigative report did, however, mention a buoy off the coast of Nova Scotia recording a record wave height of 100.7 ft (30.7 m).

Hurricane Grace is exaggerated in the movie when it is referred to by a weather forecaster as a "category 5" storm, which has winds sustained at over 137 knots (≥ 157 mph). In reality, the hurricane had already peaked at category 2 intensity and ocean buoy monitors recorded wind gusts at 65 knots (75 mph) around the time Andrea Gail sank. In the movie, Tyne and his crew agreed to head into the dangerous storm in order to save their fish from spoiling. Greenlaw acknowledged that Tyne did mention having ice problems, but that was not unusual. "My one gripe about [the] movie was how Warner Brothers depicted Billy Tyne and his crew as making a very conscious decision to steam into a storm that they knew was dangerous," said Greenlaw. "That is not what happened. Andrea Gail was three days into their steam home when the storm hit. Whatever happened to Andrea Gail happened very quickly."

An Air National Guard helicopter was dispatched from Francis S. Gabreski Air National Guard Base on Long Island, New York, but not in response to the Andrea Gail or Satori (Mistral in the movie). The helicopter departed mid-storm on a mission to help save a lone Japanese fisherman from a sinking sailboat 250 miles off the New Jersey coast. Unsuccessful and running low on fuel, the Air National Guard Sikorsky HH-60G helicopter was compelled to attempt a mid-flight refueling maneuver. The zero-visibility conditions thwarted their efforts, however, and lacking enough fuel to make the flight back to the Long Island base, the crew were forced to ditch the helicopter. After a search by Tamaroa, four of the HH-60's crew were picked up; the fifth, Technical Sergeant Arden Smith, was never seen again. The Japanese yachtsman was later rescued by a Romanian cargo ship.

When asked about the portrayal of "Sully" in the movie, Cathy Sullivan Mustone, an older sister of David "Sully" Sullivan, said she was disappointed. "They made my brother's character out to be a hothead," she said. "I guess every movie needs a villain, but my brother was a funny guy with a loud laugh and a big smile. He had a lot of guts and he loved fishing." In fact, Sullivan's bravery and quick thinking made headlines on a different boat—Harmony. One night during a winter fishing trip, Harmony began taking on water while tied to another boat. The crew of Harmony yelled for help, hoping to wake the nearby crew. No one woke, so Sullivan dove into the icy water, pulling himself on the ropes that tied the boats together. As a result of his bravery, Harmony's crew was saved. Mustone said, "At least in the movie, they did represent my brother's bravery in a water rescue scene. He was a good man."

Christina's dream about a comforting vision of Bobby is taken from the book.

=== The Satori ===
The crew members of Satori (renamed Mistral in the movie) were not rescued by an Air National Guard helicopter, but rather by a U.S. Coast Guard helicopter. The helicopter was changed in the film after the Air National Guard had issues consulting with the movie producers. According to the owner's son, Satori never made a 360° roll, although it had two knockdowns, during which it lay on its side for about 30 seconds. In response to requests by the crew, Captain Ray Leonard permitted the two crewmembers, Karen Stimpson and Susan Bylander, to make a position report over radio, during which they made an unauthorized Mayday call. One of those crewmembers reported that she was so convinced that she was going to die that she wrote her name down and put it into a plastic bag duct-taped to her stomach so her body could be identified.

There is controversy over whether the Captain was drunk, as charged by the women in the book, with Leonard objecting to this characterization. Out of compassion for the expected loss of his boat, the Coast Guard did not test his blood alcohol levels at the time. The Coast Guard declared the voyage manifestly unsafe and ordered everyone off-board, including the unwilling skipper. The Coast Guard first tried to take them on board via an inflatable boat, but after it was damaged when trying to approach Satori they sent a helicopter, which is a much riskier approach, as a rescue swimmer must jump into dangerous seas. The Coast Guard helicopter did not try to lower rescue gear onto the yacht (as shown in the movie, where it gets entangled with the mast), but rather asked the crew of Satori to jump overboard to meet a rescue swimmer in the water. Leonard eventually complied with the request.

After the storm, Leonard searched for the Satori, hoping to find her still afloat, but in spite of his attempts she was found a few days later washed ashore on a Maryland beach, a bag of personal belongings still on deck. Leonard paid for a 60-foot fishing vessel to drag her off the beach, helped by a channel dug by Park Rangers who had been guarding the boat. He continued to sail the boat until he sold her to a new owner in 2000.

=== Lawsuits ===
After the film was released, the families of two crew members sued the film makers for the fictionalization of events which happened prior to the loss of Andrea Gail. In May 2002, the Florida Supreme Court ruled against the family of Captain Tyne by a 6–2 vote. Some unnamed families also sued the producers in federal district court, claiming that their names were used without their permission, and that facts were changed. The district court, which is also located in Florida, dismissed the case, as in their opinion the defendants' First Amendment right to freedom of speech barred the suit. The plaintiffs appealed to the U.S. Court of Appeals for the 11th Circuit, which could not decide how to interpret the Florida law at issue and certified the question to the Florida Supreme Court. In the end, the Florida Supreme Court upheld the district court's interpretation of Florida law, and thereupon the 11th Circuit affirmed the prior decision to dismiss the case.

== See also ==
- 106th Rescue Wing
- Air Force Pararescue
- Godless Men (1920)
- Stormswept (1923)
- Code of the Sea (1924)
- Rugged Water (1925)
- Survival film
