= 1991 Perfect Storm =

Nor'easter and Category 1 Atlantic hurricane in 1991

1991 "Perfect Storm"
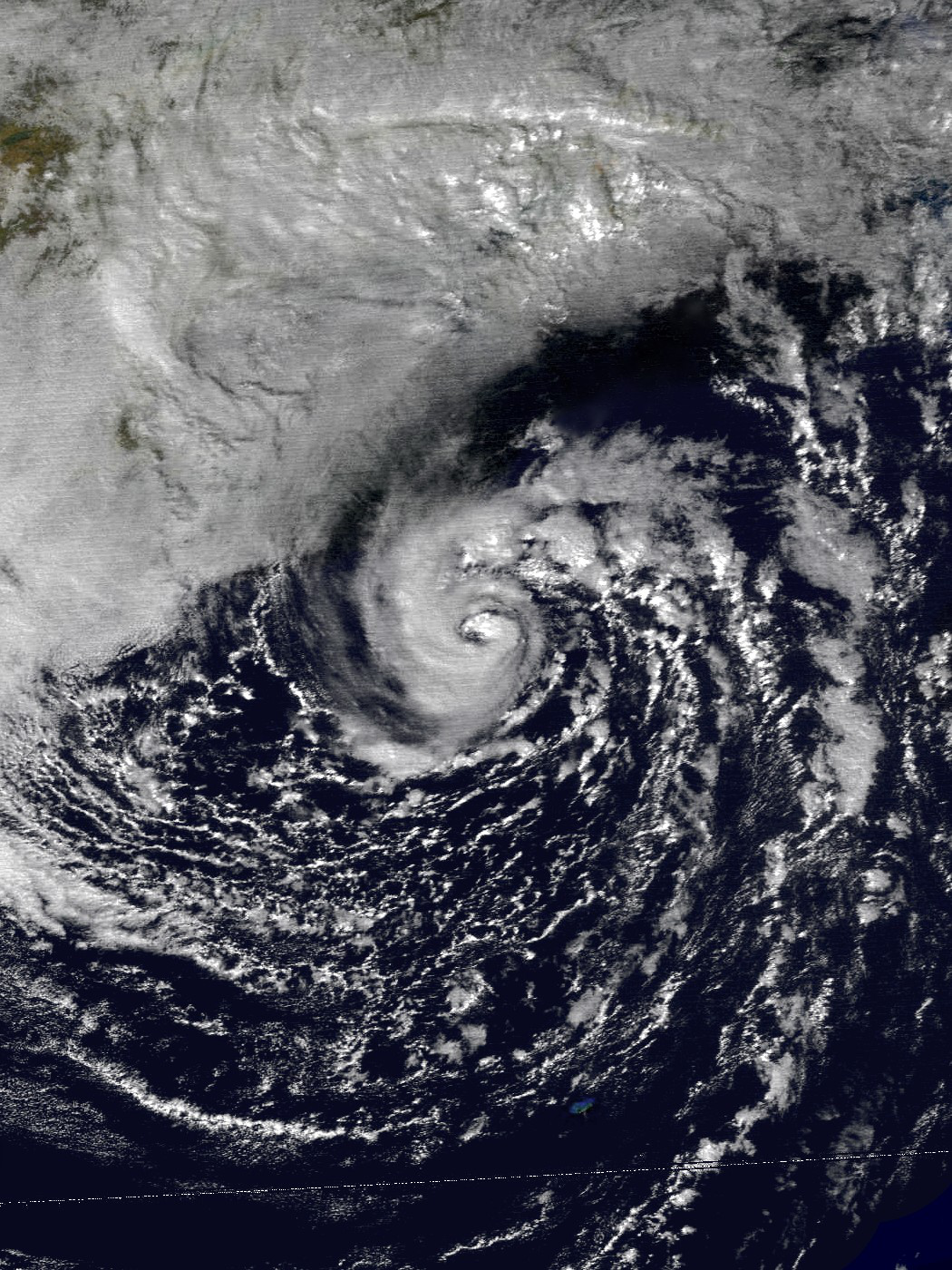
- The unnamed hurricane at peak intensity on November 1

Meteorological history
- Formed: October 28, 1991 (Extratropical until October 31)
- Dissipated: November 2, 1991

Category 1 hurricane
- 1-minute sustained (SSHWS/NWS)
- Highest winds: 75 mph (120 km/h)
- Lowest pressure: 980 mbar (hPa); 28.94 inHg (972 mbar (28.7 inHg) while extratropical)

Overall effects
- Fatalities: 13 direct
- Damage: >$200 million (1991 USD)
- Areas affected: Mid-Atlantic states, Northeastern United States, Eastern Canada
- IBTrACS
- Part of the 1991 Atlantic hurricane season

The 1991 Perfect Storm, also known as The No-Name Storm (especially in the years immediately after it took place) and the Halloween Gale/Storm, was a damaging and deadly nor'easter that lasted from October 28 to November 2, 1991. While initially an extratropical cyclone, it absorbed Hurricane Grace to its south, later evolving into a small, unnamed Category 1 hurricane. The storm lashed the East coast of the United States with high waves and coastal flooding during its extratropical cyclone phase. Damage from the storm totaled over $200 million (1991 USD) and resulted in thirteen fatalities, six of them from the sinking of the Andrea Gail, a fishing boat. The nor'easter received its name, playing off the common expression, after a conversation between Boston National Weather Service forecaster Robert Case and author Sebastian Junger.

The initial area of low pressure developed off the coast of Atlantic Canada on October 28. Forced southward by a ridge to its north, it reached its peak intensity as a large and powerful extratropical cyclone. Moving over warmer waters, the system transitioned into a subtropical cyclone and subsequently into a tropical storm. It then executed a counter-clockwise loop off the Mid-Atlantic states and turned toward the Northeast. On November 1, the system evolved into a Category 1 hurricane, with peak sustained winds of 75 miles per hour (120 km/h). The National Hurricane Center left it unnamed in order to avoid public confusion, since the storm was already widely reported in its earlier, extratropical phase. The tropical system weakened, striking Nova Scotia as a tropical storm before dissipating. The system was the twelfth and final tropical cyclone, the eighth tropical storm, and fourth hurricane in the 1991 Atlantic hurricane season.

Most of the damage occurred while the storm was extratropical, after waves up to 30 feet (10 m) struck the coastline from Nova Scotia to Florida and southeastward to Puerto Rico. In portions of New England, the damage was worse than that caused by Hurricane Bob two months earlier. Aside from tidal flooding along rivers, the storm's effects were primarily concentrated along the coast. A buoy off the coast of Nova Scotia reported a wave height of 100.7 feet (30.7 m), the highest ever recorded in the province's offshore waters. In Massachusetts, where damage was heaviest, over 100 homes were destroyed or severely damaged. To the north, in Maine, more than 100 homes were affected, including the vacation home of President George H. W. Bush. More than 38,000 people were left without power and, along the coast, high waves inundated roads and buildings. Off the shore of New York's Long Island, an Air National Guard helicopter ran out of fuel and crashed; four members of its crew were rescued and one died. Two people died after their boat sank off Staten Island. High waves swept two people to their deaths, one in Rhode Island and one in Puerto Rico, and another person was blown off a bridge to his death. The tropical storm that formed late in the system's duration caused little impact, limited to power outages and slick roads; one person was killed in Newfoundland from a traffic accident related to the storm.

== Meteorological history ==
Map plotting the storm's track and intensity, according to the Saffir–Simpson scale Map key Saffir–Simpson scale Tropical depression (≤38 mph, ≤62 km/h) Tropical storm (39–73 mph, 63–118 km/h) Category 1 (74–95 mph, 119–153 km/h) Category 2 (96–110 mph, 154–177 km/h) Category 3 (111–129 mph, 178–208 km/h) Category 4 (130–156 mph, 209–251 km/h) Category 5 (≥157 mph, ≥252 km/h) Unknown Storm type Tropical cyclone Subtropical cyclone Extratropical cyclone, remnant low, tropical disturbance, or monsoon depression

A volcanic winter is thought to have started with the 1991 eruption of Mount Pinatubo. The large quantities of ash and sulfur dioxide it released into the stratosphere formed an aerosol layer that blocked sunlight from reaching the Earth's surface and reflected solar radiation back into space. This caused global temperatures to drop by up to 0.5 - 0.6 °C (0.9 - 1.1 °F) from 1991 to 1993. Some meteorologists speculate that the altered jet stream and cooler sea surface temperatures, possibly influenced by Pinatubo's aerosols, may have contributed to the storm's unusual development and strength.

The Perfect Storm originated from a cold front that exited the East coast of the United States. On October 28, the front spawned an extratropical low to the east of Nova Scotia. At the same time, a ridge extended from the Appalachian Mountains northeastward to Greenland, anchored by a strong high-pressure center over eastern Canada. The blocking ridge forced the developing extratropical low, which would normally have moved northeastward, to track southeastward and then westward in a rare retrograde motion, initiating a set of meteorological circumstances estimated to occur only once every 50 to 100 years (most nor'easters track northeastward, but this storm instead turned southwestward). On October 29, Hurricane Grace, a tropical system that had developed separately in the western Atlantic and that was moving northward, was swept into the warm conveyor belt of the deepening cyclone. By the next day, October 30, Grace was completely absorbed. The merger enhanced the intensity of the nor'easter, fueled by the sharp temperature contrast between cold air to the northwest and the warm, moist air from Grace's remnants.

The tropical storm making landfall west of Halifax, Nova Scotia, Canada, on November 2

At approximately 12:00 UTC on October 30, while situated about 390 miles (630 km) south of Halifax, Nova Scotia, the nor'easter reached peak intensity, with a central pressure of 972 mbar and winds of up to 70 mph (110 km/h). The strong pressure gradient between the storm and the blocking high to the north produced damaging winds and very large waves. Between the southern New England coast and the center of the storm, the pressure differential was 70 mbar (2.1 inHg). A buoy 264 miles (425 km) south of Halifax, Nova Scotia, recorded a wave height of 100.7 feet (30.7 m), the highest ever measured on the Scotian Shelf, the oceanic shelf off the coast of Nova Scotia. East of Cape Cod, at approximately 15:00 UTC on October 30, a NOAA buoy located at 41.1°N 66.6°W recorded maximum sustained winds of 56 mph (90 km/h) with gusts to 75 mph (121 km/h), and a significant wave height (average height of the highest one-third of all waves) of 39 feet (12 m). Another buoy, located at 40.5°N 69.5°W, recorded maximum sustained winds of 61 mph (98 km/h) with gusts to 72 mph (116 km/h) and a significant wave height of 31 feet (9.4 m) at approximately 00:00 UTC on October 31.

Upon peaking in intensity, the nor'easter turned southward and gradually weakened. By November 1, its pressure had risen to 998 millibars (29.5 inHg). The low moved over warm waters of the Gulf Stream, where bands of convection around the center began to organize. Around this time, the system attained subtropical characteristics. While the storm was moving in a counter-clockwise loop, a tropical cyclone had been identified at the center of the larger low (these conditions, although rare, had been observed: during 1980, Hurricane Karl formed within a larger non-tropical weather system). By approximately 14:00 UTC on November 1, an eye feature was forming, and the tropical cyclone reached its peak intensity with maximum sustained winds of 75 mph (121 km/h); these estimates, combined with reports from an Air Force Reserve Unit flight into the storm and confirmation that a warm-core center was present, indicated that the system had become a Category 1 hurricane on the Saffir–Simpson Hurricane Scale. The hurricane accelerated toward the northeast and quickly weakened back into a tropical storm. It made landfall near Halifax, Nova Scotia, at 14:00 UTC on November 2, with sustained winds of 45 mph (72 km/h). While the storm was approaching the coast, weather radars depicted curved rainbands on the western side of the system. After crossing over Prince Edward Island, the storm fully dissipated late on November 2.

== Preparations and naming ==
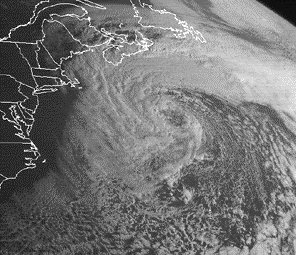
The Perfect Storm to the south of Nova Scotia on October 30.

For several days, weather models forecast the development of a significant storm off New England. However, the models were inadequate in forecasting coastal conditions, which in one instance failed to provide adequate warning. In addition, a post-storm assessment found an insufficient number of observation sites along the coast. On October 27, the Ocean Prediction Center noted that a "dangerous storm" would form within 36 hours, with its wording emphasizing the unusual nature of the storm. The National Weather Service likewise issued warnings for the potential storm, providing information to emergency service offices as well as the media. The public, however, was skeptical and did not recognize the threat. The timely warnings ultimately lowered the death toll; whereas the Perfect Storm caused 13 deaths, the blizzard of 1978 killed 99 people, and the 1938 New England hurricane killed 564 people.

From Massachusetts to Maine, thousands of people evacuated their homes and sought shelter. A state of emergency was declared for nine counties in Massachusetts, including Suffolk County, as well as two in Maine. In North Carolina, the National Weather Service offices in Hatteras and Raleigh first issued a heavy surf advisory on October 27, more than eight hours before the first reports of high waves. That same day, a coastal flood watch and later a warning was issued, along with a gale warning. The Hatteras NWS office ultimately released 19 coastal flood statements, as well as media reports explaining the threat from the wind and waves, and a state of emergency was declared for Dare County, North Carolina. The warnings and lead times in the region were described as "very good".

In Canada, the threat from the storm prompted the cancellation of ferry service from Bar Harbor, Maine, to Yarmouth, Nova Scotia, as well as from Nova Scotia to Prince Edward Island and between Nova Scotia and Newfoundland.

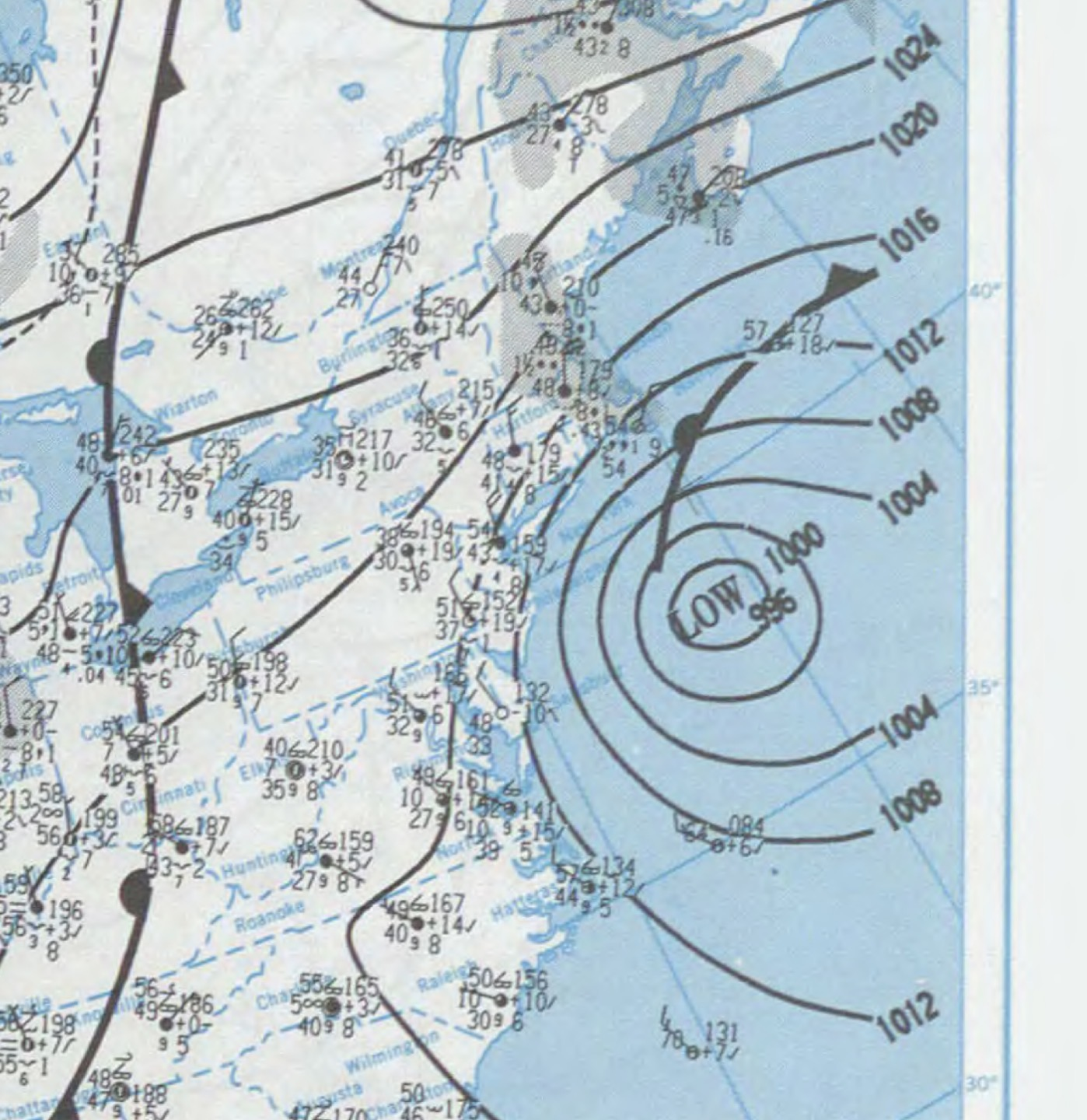
Weather map of the storm at its closest approach to the U.S East Coast on October 31

In its tropical cyclone report on the hurricane, the National Hurricane Center only referred to the system as "Unnamed Hurricane". The Natural Disaster Survey Report called the storm "The Halloween Nor'easter of 1991". The "perfect storm" moniker was coined by author and journalist Sebastian Junger after a conversation with NWS Boston Deputy Meteorologist Robert Case in which Case described the convergence of weather conditions as being "perfect" for the formation of such a storm. Other National Weather Service offices were tasked with issuing warnings for this storm in lieu of the typical NHC advisories. The OPC posted warnings on the unnamed hurricane in its High Seas Forecasts. The National Weather Service State Forecast Office in Boston issued Offshore Marine Forecasts for the storm. Local NWS offices along the East coast covered the storm in their Coastal Waters Forecasts.

Beginning in 1950, the National Hurricane Center named officially recognized tropical storms and hurricanes. The unnamed hurricane was reported to have met all the criteria for a tropical cyclone, but it was purposefully left unnamed. This was done to avoid confusion among the media and the public, who were focusing on the damage from the initial nor'easter, as the hurricane itself was not expected to pose a major threat to land. It was the eighth nameable storm of the 1991 Atlantic hurricane season. Had the system been named instead, it would have received the name Henri, which was the next name on the 1991 list after Grace.

== Impact ==
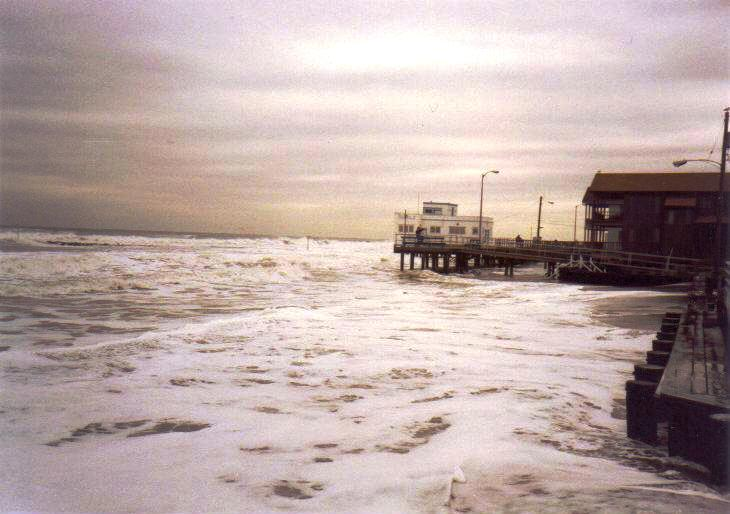
Oceanfront flooding in Ocean City, New Jersey on October 31.

The Halloween Storm of 1991 left significant damage along the east coast of the United States, primarily in Massachusetts and southern New Jersey. Across seven states, damage totaled over $200 million (1991 USD). Over a three-day period, the storm lashed the northeastern United States with high waves, causing damage to beachfront properties from North Carolina to Maine. The coastal flooding damaged or destroyed hundreds of homes and businesses and closed roads and airports. In addition, high winds left about 38,000 people without power. The total without power was much less than for Hurricane Bob two months prior, and was fairly low due to little rainfall and the general lack of leaves on trees. Overall there were thirteen confirmed deaths, including six on board Andrea Gail, a swordfishing boat. The vessel departed Gloucester, Massachusetts, for the waters off Nova Scotia. After encountering high seas in the middle of the storm, the vessel made its last radio contact late on October 28, about 180 miles (290 km) northeast of Sable Island. Andrea Gail sank while returning to Gloucester, her debris washing ashore over the subsequent weeks. The crew of six was presumed killed after a Coast Guard search was unable to find them. The storm and the boat's sinking became the center-piece for Sebastian Junger's best-selling non-fiction book The Perfect Storm (1997), which was adapted to a major Hollywood film in 2000 as The Perfect Storm starring George Clooney.

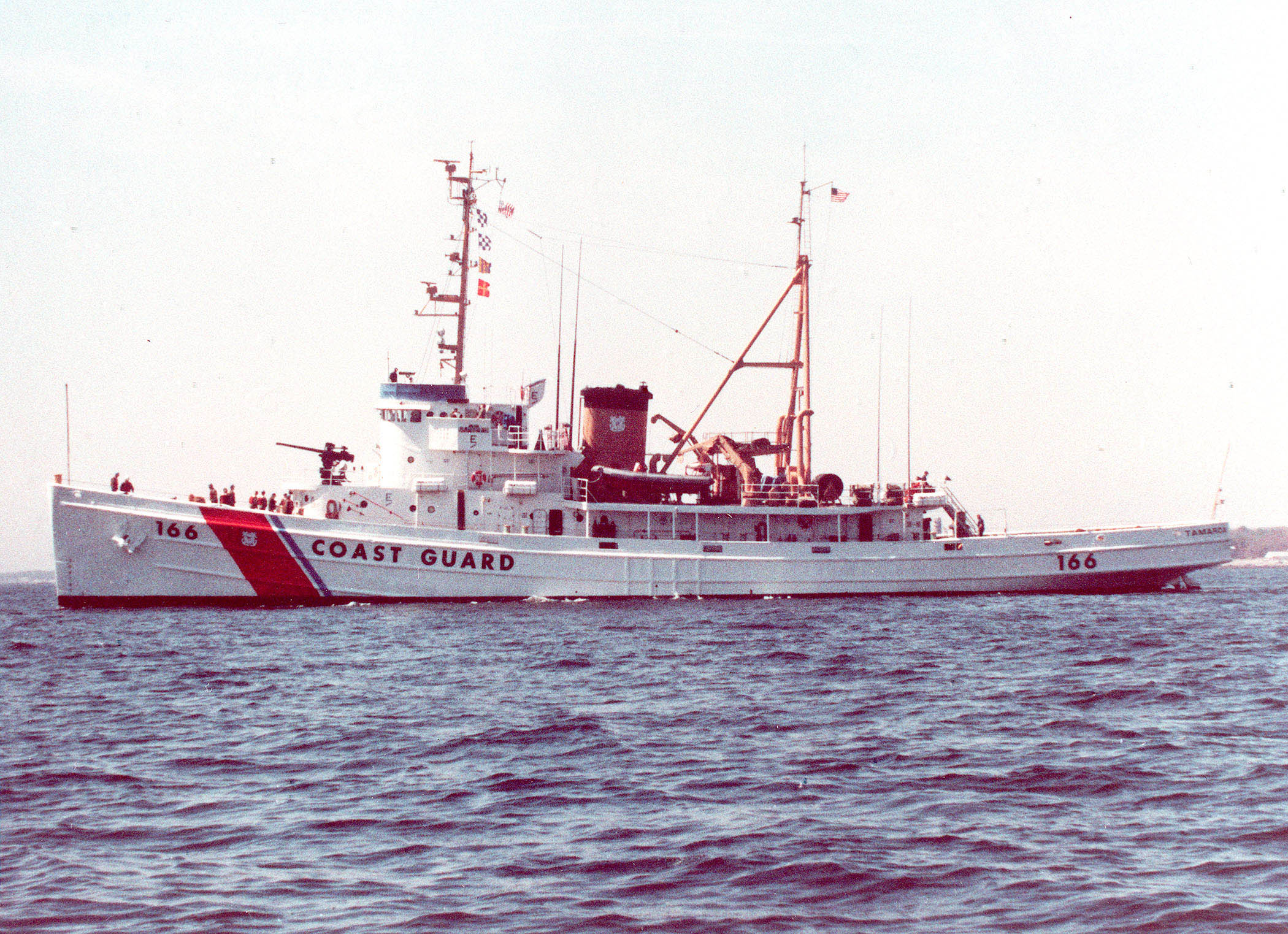
Tamaroa, a Coast Guard cutter that rescued the crew of a downed Air National Guard helicopter

Despite the storm's severity, it was neither the costliest nor the strongest to affect the northeastern United States. It was weakening as it made its closest approach to land, and the highest tides occurred during the neap tide, which is the time when tide ranges are minimal. The worst of the storm effects stayed offshore. A buoy 650 miles (1,050 km) northeast of Nantucket, which was 60 miles (97 km) west of Andrea Gail's last known position, recorded a 73 ft (22 m) rise in wave height in 10 hours while the extratropical storm was still rapidly intensifying. Two buoys near the Massachusetts coast observed record wave heights, and one observed a record wind report. The United States Coast Guard rescued 25 people at sea at the height of the storm, including 13 people from Long Island Sound. A New York Air National Guard Sikorsky HH-60G helicopter of the 106th Air Rescue Wing ditched during the storm, 90 miles (140 km) south of Montauk, New York, after it was unable to refuel in flight and ran out of fuel. After the helicopter had attempted a rescue in the midst of the storm, an 84-person crew on the Coast Guard Cutter Tamaroa arrived and rescued four members of the crew of five after six hours in hypothermic waters. The survivors were pilots, Major Christopher David Ruvola and Captain Graham Buschor, flight engineer Staff Sergeant James R. Mioli, and pararescue jumper Technical Sergeant John Spillane. The fifth member, pararescue jumper Technical Sergeant Arden Richard Smith, was never found. They were all featured on the show I Shouldn't Be Alive.

Following the storm's damage, President George H. W. Bush declared five counties in Maine, seven counties in Massachusetts, and Rockingham County, New Hampshire to be disaster areas. The declaration allowed for the affected residents to apply for low-interest repair loans. New Jersey governor Jim Florio requested a declaration for portions of the coastline, but the request was denied because of the funding needs of other disasters, such as Hurricane Hugo, Hurricane Bob, and the 1989 Loma Prieta earthquake. The American Red Cross opened service centers in four locations in Massachusetts to assist the storm victims by providing food, clothing, medicine, and shelter. The agency deployed five vehicles carrying cleanup units and food, and allocated $1.4 million to provide assistance to 3,000 families.

=== New England and Atlantic Canada ===
Along the Massachusetts coastline, the storm produced 25 ft (7.6 m) wave heights on top of a 4 ft (1.2 m) high tide. In Boston, the highest tide was 14.3 ft (4.4 m), which was only 1 ft (30 cm) lower than the record from the blizzard of 1978. High waves on top of the storm tide reached about 30 ft (9.1 m). The storm produced heavy rainfall in southeastern Massachusetts, peaking at 5.5 inches (140 mm). Coastal floods closed several roads, forcing hundreds of people to evacuate. In addition to the high tides, the storm produced strong winds; Chatham recorded a gust of 78 mph (126 km/h). Damage was worst from Cape Ann in northeastern Massachusetts to Nantucket, with over 100 homes destroyed or severely damaged at Marshfield, Minot Beach in Scituate, and Brant Point. There were two injuries in the state, although there were no fatalities. Across Massachusetts, damage totaled in the hundreds of millions of dollars.

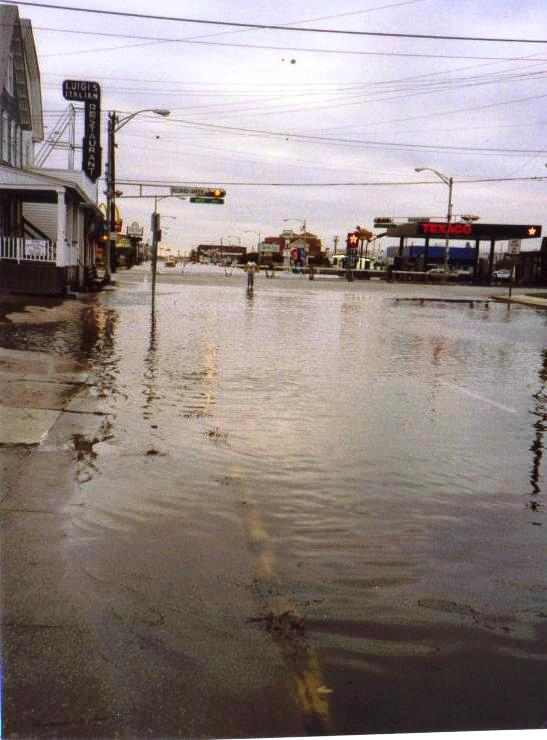
Street flooding in Ocean City, New Jersey, from the storm

Elsewhere in New England, waves up to 30 ft (9.1 m) reached as far north as Maine, along with tides that were 3 ft (0.91 m) above normal. Significant flooding was reported in that state, along with high winds that left areas without power. A total of 49 houses were severely damaged, 2 were destroyed, and overall more than 100 were affected. In Kennebunkport, the storm blew out windows and flooded the vacation home of then-President George H. W. Bush. The home sustained significant damage to its first floor. In Portland, tides were 3 ft (0.91 m) above normal, among the ten highest tides since record-keeping began in 1914. Along the coast, damage was worse than that caused by Hurricane Bob two months prior. Across Maine, the storm left $7.9 million (1991 USD) in damage, mostly in York County. More than half of the damage total was from property damage, with the remainder to transportation, seawalls, and public facilities. Although there were no deaths, there were two injuries in the state. In neighboring New Hampshire, coastal flooding affected several towns, destroying two homes. The storm destroyed three boats and damaged a lighthouse. High waves destroyed or swept away over 50,000 lobster traps, representing $2 million in losses (1991 USD). Damage was estimated at $5.6 million (1991 USD). Further west, high winds and coastal flooding lashed the Rhode Island and Connecticut coasts, killing a man in Narragansett, Rhode Island. Winds reached 63 miles per hour (101 km/h) in Newport, Rhode Island, causing power outages.

Off the coast of Atlantic Canada, the storm produced very high waves, flooding a ship near Sable Island and stranding another ship. Along the coast, the waves wrecked three small boats near Tiverton, Nova Scotia, as well as nine boats in Torbay, Newfoundland and Labrador. In Nova Scotia, where the storm made landfall, precipitation reached 1.18 in (30 mm), and 20,000 people in Pictou County were left without power. The storm also caused widespread power outages in Newfoundland from its high winds, which reached 68 mph (110 km/h) near St. Lawrence. There were at least 35 traffic accidents, one fatal, in Grand Falls-Windsor due to slick roads. On October 28, prior to the nor'easter's development into a subtropical storm, a record 4.4 in (116 mm) of snowfall was recorded across Newfoundland. The storm caused no significant damage in Canada, other than these traffic accidents.

=== Mid-Atlantic states ===
The cyclone near its closest approach to the United States

In New York and northern New Jersey, the storm system left the most coastal damage since the 1944 Great Atlantic hurricane. Further inland, the Hudson, Passaic, and Hackensack rivers experienced tidal flooding. Numerous boats were damaged or destroyed, killing two people off Staten Island. High winds swept a man off a bridge, killing him. High waves flooded the beach at Coney Island. Fire Island National Seashore was affected, washing away an entire row of waterfront houses in towns like Fair Harbor. Outside Massachusetts, damage was heaviest in southern New Jersey, where the cost was estimated at $75 million (1991 USD). Across the area, tide heights reached their highest since the 1944 hurricane, leaving severe coastal and back bay flooding and closing many roads. The storm caused significant beach erosion, with 500,000 cubic yards (382,000 cubic meters) lost in Avalon, as well as $10 million damage to the beach in Cape May. The presence of a dune system mitigated the erosion in some areas. There was damage to the Atlantic City Boardwalk. In Sea Bright, New Jersey, waves washed over a seawall, forcing 200 people to evacuate. Following the storm, there was a moratorium on clamming in the state's bays, due to contaminated waters. Along the Delmarva Peninsula and Virginia Beach, there was widespread water damage to homes, including ten affected houses in the Sandbridge Beach area of Virginia Beach, Virginia. Tides in Ocean City, Maryland, reached a record height of 7.8 ft (2.4 m), while elsewhere the tides were similar to the Ash Wednesday Storm of 1962.

=== Farther south ===
In North Carolina along the Outer Banks, high waves were initially caused by Hurricane Grace and later its interaction with a high pressure system. This produced gale-force winds and 12 ft (3.7 m) waves in the town of Duck. Later, the extratropical predecessor to the unnamed hurricane produced additional high waves, causing oceanfront flooding from Cape Hatteras through the northern portions of Currituck County. Flooding was first reported on October 28, when the ocean covered a portion of North Carolina Highway 12 north of Rodanthe; the route is the primary thoroughfare in the Outer Banks. Nags Head, Kitty Hawk, and Kill Devil Hills had large portions covered with water for several blocks away from the beach. The resultant flooding damaged 525 houses and 28 businesses and destroyed two motels and a few homes. Damage was estimated at $6.7 million (1991 USD). Farther south, the storm left 14 people injured in Florida. There was minor beach erosion and flooding, which damaged two houses and destroyed the pier at Lake Worth. In some locations, beaches gained additional sand from the wave action. Two people went missing off Daytona Beach after their boat lost power. High waves destroyed a portion of State Road A1A. Damage in the state was estimated at $3 million (1991 USD). High waves also affected Bermuda, the Bahamas, and the Dominican Republic. In Puerto Rico, waves of 15 ft (4.6 m) affected the island's north coast, which prompted 32 people to seek shelter. The waves swept a person off a large rock to his death.

== In media ==
The storm was the basis of the book and movie The Perfect Storm. It was also the subject of an episode from the Discovery Channel program I Shouldn't Be Alive.

== See also ==
- North Atlantic tropical cyclone
- List of unnamed tropical cyclones
- List of New England hurricanes
- List of Canada hurricanes
- List of Category 1 Atlantic hurricanes
- 1991 Halloween blizzard
- Hurricane Juan (2003)
- Hurricane Sandy (2012)
- Tropical Storm Melissa (2019)
- Hurricane Henri (2021)
- October 2021 nor'easter – A similar nor'easter that developed into Tropical Storm Wanda several days after striking the Northeastern U.S.
