= The Perfect Storm (book) =

Book by Sebastian Junger

A True Story of Men Against the Sea
- First edition cover
- Author: Sebastian Junger
- Language: English
- Subject: Andrea Gail, 1991 Perfect Storm, shipwrecks a true story of man against the sea
- Genre: Creative nonfiction
- Publisher: W. W. Norton & Company
- Publication date: May 17, 1997
- Publication place: United States
- Pages: xii, 227
- ISBN: 0-393-04016-X
- OCLC: 35397863
- Dewey Decimal: 974.4/5
- LC Class: QC945 .J66 1997

The Perfect Storm is a creative nonfiction book written by Sebastian Junger and published by W. W. Norton & Company in 1997. The paperback edition (ISBN 0-06-097747-7) followed in 1999 from HarperCollins' Perennial imprint. The book is about the 1991 Perfect Storm that hit North America between October 28 and November 4, 1991, and features the crew of the fishing boat Andrea Gail, from Gloucester, Massachusetts, who were lost at sea during severe conditions while longline fishing for swordfish 575 miles (925 km) out. Also in the book is the story about the rescue of the three-person crew of the sailboat Satori in the Atlantic Ocean during the storm by the U.S. Coast Guard Cutter Tamaroa (WMEC-166).

The book follows the lives of the swordfishing crew of Andrea Gail and their family members before and during the 1991 Perfect Storm. Among the men boarding Andrea Gail were Captain Frank William "Billy" Tyne Jr., Alfred "AP" Pierre, David "Sully" Sullivan, Michael "Bugsy" Moran, Dale "Murph" Murphy, and Robert F. "Bobby" Shatford, each bringing his own intelligence, physical strength, and hope aboard with him. The men were raised with the expectation that they would become fishermen. As "Sully" said, even before they had left for their long journey, "It's the money ... If I didn't need the money I wouldn't go near this thing."

Much of the early part of the book gives detailed descriptions of the daily lives of the fishermen and their jobs, and is centered around activities at the Crow's Nest, a tavern in Gloucester popular with the fishermen.

The latter part of the book attempts to reconstruct events at sea during the storm, aboard Andrea Gail as well as rescue efforts directed at several other ships caught in the storm, including the attempted rescue of pararescuemen who were themselves caught in the storm. Lost from the New York Air National Guard HH-60 helicopter was TSgt. Arden "Rick" Smith. A week-long search off the South Shore of Long Island failed to find his remains. Surviving the helicopter crash were Maj. David Ruvola, Capt. Graham Buschor, SSgt. Jimmy Mioli and TSgt. John Spillane, the second pararescueman aboard.

All six crew members of Andrea Gail were missing, presumed dead. The ship and crew were never found. A few fuel drums, a fuel tank, the EPIRB, an empty life raft, and some other flotsam were the only wreckage ever discovered.

== Adaptation ==
The book was adapted for the 2000 film of the same title, directed by Wolfgang Petersen. Satori is renamed Mistral in the movie, and the since-retired USCGC Tamaroa is portrayed by a newer, 210-foot medium-endurance cutter.
