= 1991 Atlantic hurricane season =

- Season summary map

Seasonal boundaries
- First system formed: July 2, 1991
- Last system dissipated: November 2, 1991

Strongest storm
- Name: Claudette
  - Maximum winds: 130 mph (215 km/h) (1-minute sustained)
  - Lowest pressure: 944 mbar (hPa; 27.88 inHg)

Seasonal statistics
- Total depressions: 12
- Total storms: 8
- Hurricanes: 4
- Major hurricanes (Cat. 3+): 2
- ACE: 36
- Total fatalities: 30 total
- Total damage: ~ $1.68 billion (1991 USD)

Related articles
- Timeline of the 1991 Atlantic hurricane season; 1991 Pacific hurricane season; 1991 Pacific typhoon season; 1991 North Indian Ocean cyclone season

The 1991 Atlantic hurricane season was a below-average yet destructive Atlantic hurricane season, mainly due to Hurricane Bob and the Perfect Storm. There were 12 tropical cyclones this season, 8 of which became named storms. Among them, 4 become hurricanes, of which 2 became major hurricanes (Category 3 to 5 strength on the Saffir–Simpson scale). The season officially began on June 1, and ended on November 30.

Ana developed on July 2 off the southeast United States and dissipated without causing significant effects. Two other tropical storms in the season – Danny and Erika – did not significantly affect land. Danny dissipated east of the Lesser Antilles, and Erika passed through the Azores before becoming extratropical. In addition, there were four non-developing tropical depressions. The second depression of the season struck Mexico with significant accompanying rains.

The most significant storm of the season was Hurricane Bob, which at the time was among the ten costliest United States hurricanes. After brushing the Outer Banks of North Carolina and Long Island in New York, the hurricane made landfall on Rhode Island. It caused $1.5 billion in damage (1991 USD), mostly in Massachusetts, and 17 fatalities. The strongest hurricane of the season was Claudette, which reached peak winds of 130 mph (210 km/h) near Bermuda. It passed near the island but did not cause any damage. Fabian was the only tropical storm to move over or near Cuba or Florida, producing heavy rainfall but no damage. Hurricane Grace, the final named storm of the season, provided the energy that led to the development of a powerful nor'easter known as the Perfect Storm. Originating from an extratropical storm, the Perfect Storm intensified while moving westward toward New England, leaving $200 million in damage and causing coastal damage from Puerto Rico to Florida and northward through Canada. It later transitioned into a hurricane over the Gulf Stream, finally dissipating over Nova Scotia on November 2.

== Seasonal forecasts ==
Predictions of tropical activity in the 1991 season
Source	Date	Named storms	Hurricanes	Major hurricanes	Ref
CSU	April	<10	<6	Unknown
WRC	April	9–10	6	5
CSU	June	8	4	1
CSU	August	7	3	Unknown
Record high activity		30	15	7 (Tie)
Record low activity		1	0 (tie)	0
Actual activity		8	4	2

Before the start of the season, hurricane expert William M. Gray released his forecast for the year's activity, a yearly practice that he began in 1984. In early April, Gray anticipated a "mild" season with fewer than ten tropical storms, of which less than six would become hurricanes. Later that month, the Weather Research Center forecast ten named storms and six hurricanes, of which five would become major hurricanes. (Note: A major hurricane is a tropical cyclone with maximum sustained winds of at least 111 mph (179 km/h), or a Category 3 or higher on the Saffir-Simpson scale.) while three would hit the United States. In early June, Gray released an updated report that predicted the formation of eight tropical storms, four hurricanes, and one major hurricane. The revised June total was very close to the actual season activity, with the exception of forecasting one fewer major hurricane. However, a later revision in August incorrectly anticipated less activity, when Gray predicted seven storms and three hurricanes.

== Seasonal summary ==
For a chronological guide, see Timeline of the 1991 Atlantic hurricane season

Overall activity in 1991 was below normal. This was partially due to decreased tropical cyclogenesis from African tropical waves, which are troughs that move across the ocean with associated convection. In most seasons, the majority of storms develop from tropical waves. Of the season's twelve tropical cyclones, only five originated from tropical waves; in addition, only three of the eight tropical storms were from tropical waves, and none had the characteristics of a Cape Verde-type hurricane. From late April to late November, there were 73 tropical waves that exited the west coast of Africa. The total was higher than average, although many of them were poorly defined and had little thunderstorm activity. The waves traversed the Atlantic Ocean further south than normal, typically not becoming convectively active until moving across northern South America. Cyclogenesis was also suppressed by higher than normal wind shear, as well as low rainfall amounts across the Sahel. There were also no tropical storms in the Gulf of Mexico for only the third time in the 20th century, after 1927 and 1962. The season produced twelve tropical depressions, which was the lowest in five years. The eight tropical storms was the lowest amount in four years. Four of the storms developed into hurricanes, although for the first time in over 24 years, none of the hurricanes originated from tropical waves.

The season's activity was reflected with a low cumulative accumulated cyclone energy (ACE) rating of 36. ACE is, broadly speaking, a measure of the power of the hurricane multiplied by the length of time it existed, so storms that last a long time, as well as particularly strong hurricanes, have high ACEs. ACE is only calculated for full advisories on tropical systems at or exceeding 34 knots (39 mph; 63 km/h) or tropical storm strength. Although officially, subtropical cyclones are excluded from the total, the figure above includes periods when storms were in a subtropical phase.

== Systems ==
=== Tropical Storm Ana ===
- Tropical storm (SSHWS)
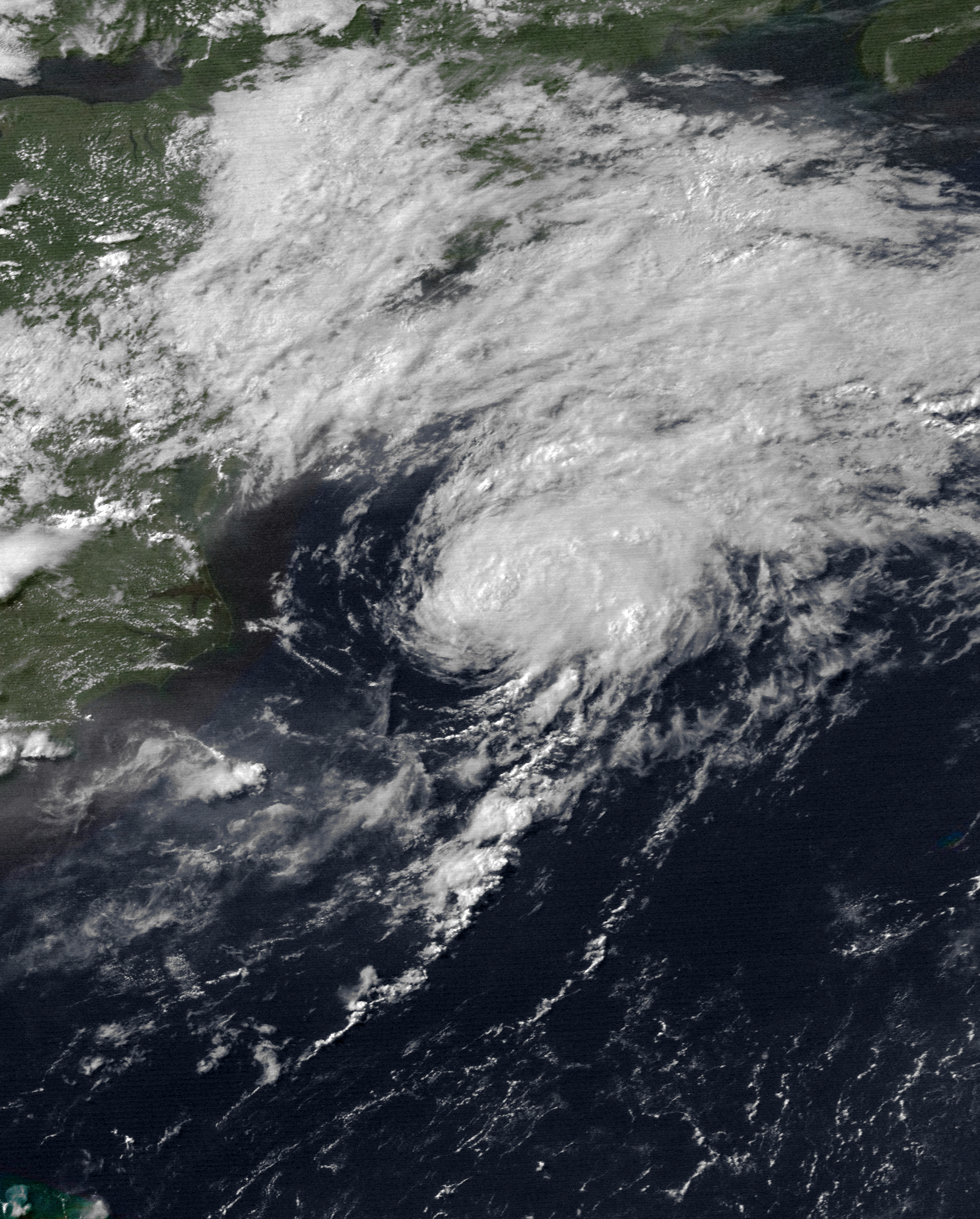
- Duration: July 2 – July 5
- Peak intensity: 50 mph (85 km/h) (1-min); 1000 mbar (hPa)

The first storm of the season was Ana, which originated from a cold-core low that persisted east of Jacksonville, Florida, by June 25. The system moved in a clockwise motion around an anticyclone located over Florida. The cold-core low gradually developed to the surface, and on June 29, a low pressure area formed within a surface trough over the Bahamas. It moved westward across southern Florida, dropping heavy rainfall along its path. Punta Gorda recorded a statewide peak of 7.86 in (200 mm) of precipitation. The low moved northwestward and later curved northeastward, exiting into the Atlantic Ocean near Saint Augustine by early on July 2. Although it was initially disorganized as it moved offshore, the convection quickly developed in organization, and by 1800 UTC that day it had developed into Tropical Depression One about 85 mi (137 km) south of Charleston, South Carolina.

As the depression moved northeastward parallel to the southeast United States coastline, it dropped light rainfall, although portions of Virginia recorded more than 5 inches (130 mm). Late on July 3, a buoy reported sustained winds of 38 mph (61 km/h) over a period of eight and a half minutes. As a result, the National Hurricane Center upgraded the depression to Tropical Storm Ana. The storm accelerated east-northeastward toward a stalled frontal zone, entering an area of increased wind shear. Despite these hostile conditions, Ana strengthened slightly, reaching peak winds of 50 mph (80 km/h). Moving over cooler waters and interacting with the frontal zone, the circulation became broad as the thunderstorms diminished. On July 5, Ana became extratropical in the northern Atlantic Ocean about 680 mi (1,090 km) to the south of Cape Race.

=== Tropical Depression Two ===
- Tropical depression (SSHWS)
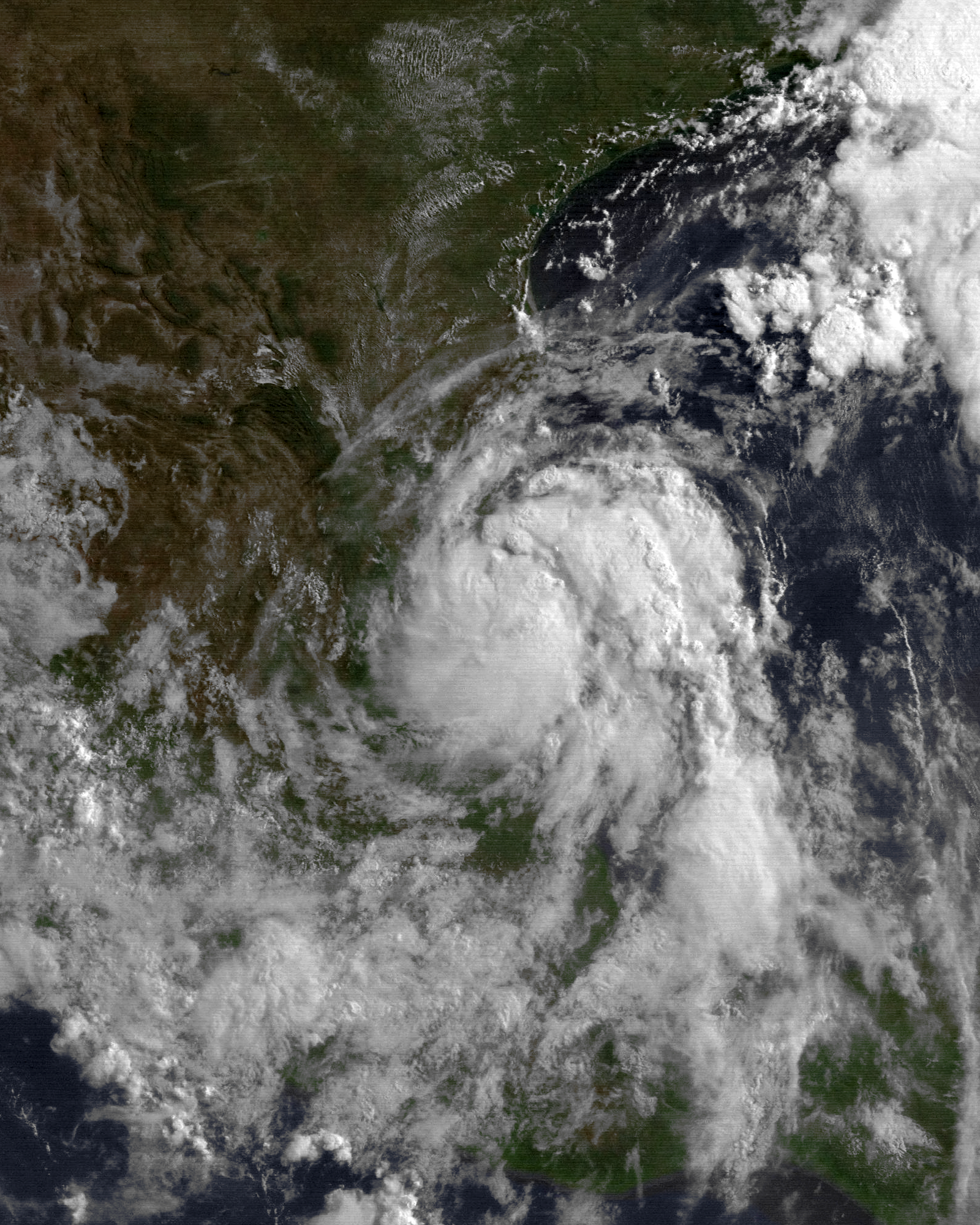
- Duration: July 5 – July 7
- Peak intensity: 35 mph (55 km/h) (1-min); 1007 mbar (hPa)

A tropical wave emerged off the coast of Africa on June 20, and no significant development occurred until it became Tropical Depression Two in the western Gulf of Mexico on July 5. On its first advisory, a tropical storm watch was issued for from Baffin Bay, Texas, southward to Tampico, Tamaulipas. Nearing the coast of Mexico, the depression attained its peak intensity with winds of 35 mph (56 km/h) and a minimum pressure of 1,007 mbar (29.7 inHg). Failing to intensify further, Tropical Depression Two made landfall near La Pesca, Tamaulipas, on July 6. The National Hurricane Center issued the final advisory on July 7, although the circulation persisted until July 9 southwest of Texas. The depression had only minor impacts in Mexico and Texas, other than rainfall. Precipitation was heaviest in the state of San Luis Potosí, where the rainfall peaked at 17.47 in (444 mm) in Tamazunchale.

=== Hurricane Bob ===
- Category 3 hurricane (SSHWS)
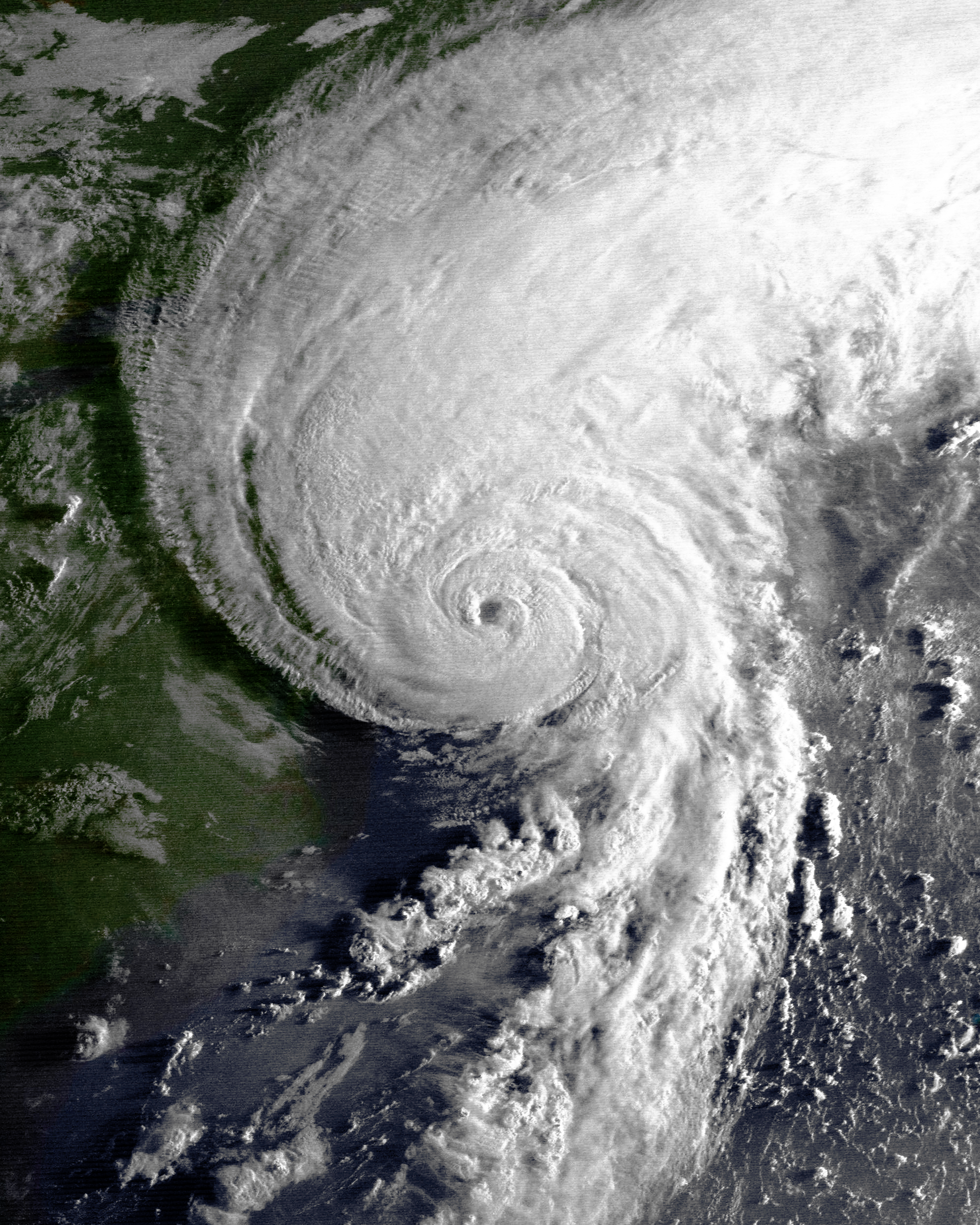
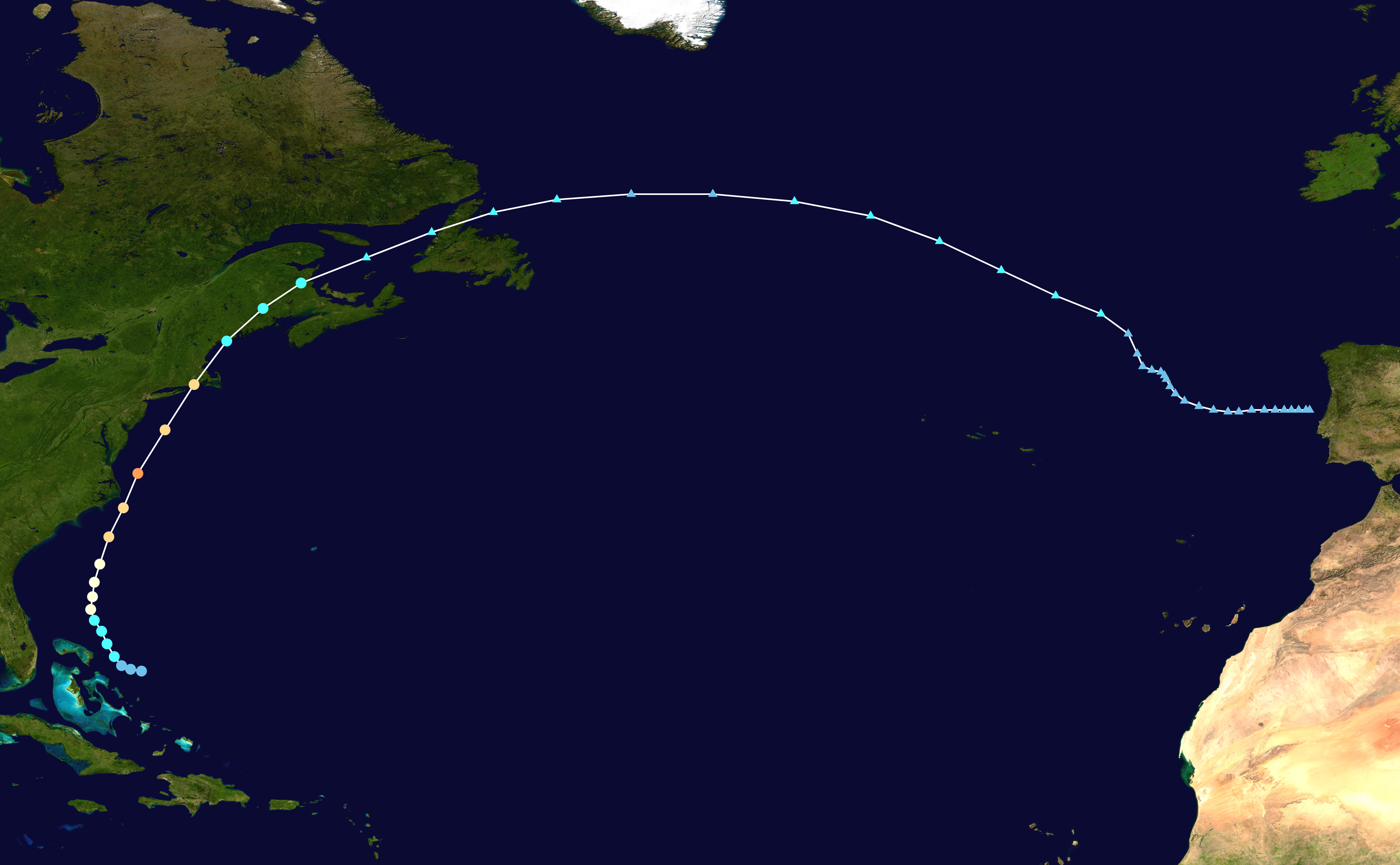
- Duration: August 16 – August 20
- Peak intensity: 115 mph (185 km/h) (1-min); 950 mbar (hPa)

Hurricane Bob originated from a decaying cold front, developing into a tropical depression early on August 16 near the Bahamas. It produced an area of organized convection, and the depression intensified into Tropical Storm Bob roughly 18 hours after forming. It gradually organized over the Gulf Stream, and based on reports from the Hurricane Hunters, (Note: The Hurricane Hunters are part of the 403d Wing of the Air Force Reserve Command who have been flying into tropical storms and hurricanes since 1944.) Bob attained hurricane status on August 17. Shortly thereafter, the hurricane began to turn towards the north-northeast in response to a subtropical ridge over the Atlantic and the trough over the southeastern United States. After further intensification off the Carolinas, Bob reached peak winds of 115 mph (185 km/h) to the east of Virginia on August 19, making it a major hurricane. Significantly cooler sea surface temperatures resulted in weakening. After brushing Long Island, the center of Bob moved over Block Island, Rhode Island. About 40 minutes later it struck Newport, Rhode Island, with winds of 100 mph (160 km/h), making it a Category 2 hurricane. It rapidly weakened to tropical storm intensity while moving through the remainder of New England, hitting Rockport, Maine, early on August 20. After crossing New Brunswick, Bob became extratropical in the Gulf of St. Lawrence and lasted another nine days before dissipating west of Portugal.

The hurricane first affected the Carolinas, spawning four confirmed and nine unconfirmed tornadoes in North Carolina. One person each died in North and South Carolina, and about 10% of houses in the Outer Banks sustained minor roof damage. As the storm moved up the coast, heavy rain fell on the western side of the center. High winds left 300,000 people without power on Long Island. In neighboring Connecticut, strong winds downed trees across the region, with damage heaviest in the southeastern portion near the coast. Damage was heaviest as Bob made its final landfall, with wind gusts of 105 mph (169 km/h) reported on Block Island, Rhode Island. The hurricane produced extensive beach erosion which destroyed coastal roads in the state. Monetary damage was greatest in Massachusetts, and along Bob's path through southeastern New England more than 60% of people were left without power. High tides and strong winds destroyed boats and houses along the Massachusetts coastline. The heaviest rainfall from the hurricane fell at the Portland International Jetport in Maine, where 8.24 in (209 mm) fell during its passage. Across the United States, damage totaled $1.5 billion (1991 USD), including over $1 billion in Massachusetts. The high damage total made Bob among the ten costliest U.S. hurricanes at the time. In addition, there were 15 fatalities in the country. In Canada, high waves killed two people. In Fredericton, New Brunswick, tropical storm-force winds downed trees and power lines.

=== Tropical Depression Four ===
- Tropical depression (SSHWS)
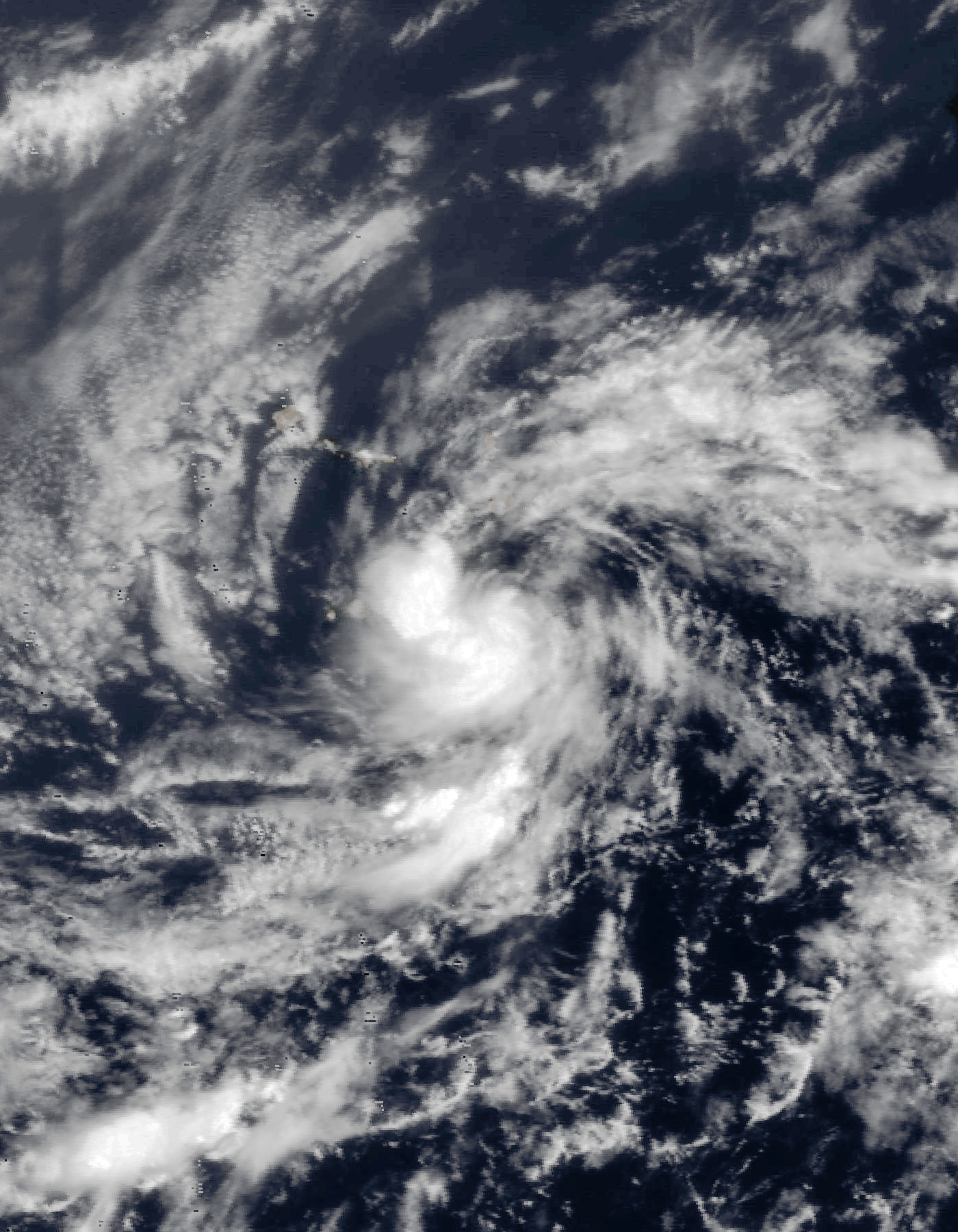
- Duration: August 24 – August 26
- Peak intensity: 35 mph (55 km/h) (1-min); 1009 mbar (hPa)

One of the few vigorous tropical waves of the season emerged from the western coast of Africa with a large area of convection in late August. On August 24 it developed into a tropical depression near Cape Verde. Upon first forming, the depression had a circular area of convection near the center. It was initially well-organized, but the depression was not expected to intensify due to marginal water temperatures; tropical cyclones generally require warm waters to develop. By August 25, the system lost much of its deep convection, and on August 26 the depression dissipated to the west-southwest of the Cape Verde islands.

=== Tropical Depression Five ===
- Tropical depression (SSHWS)
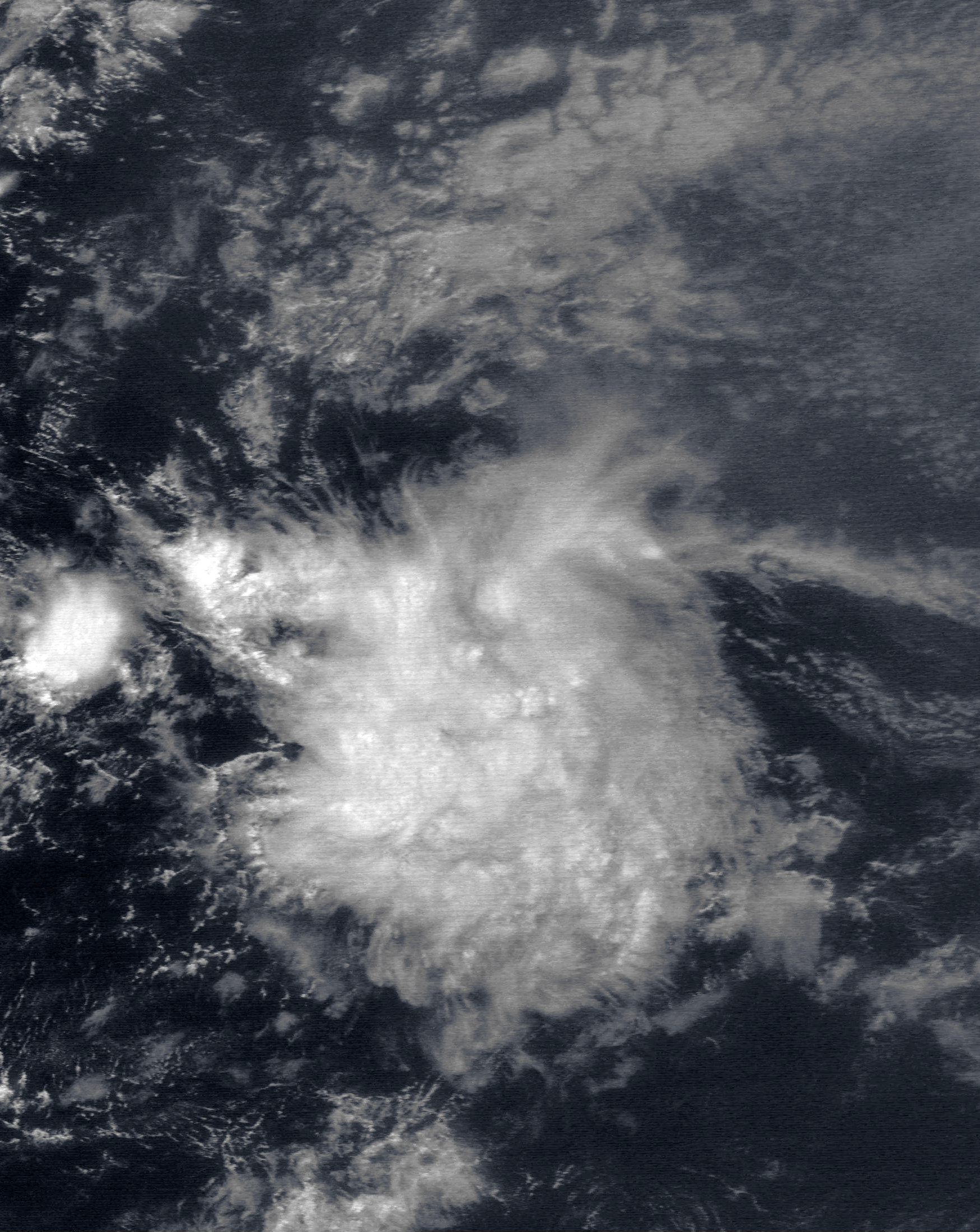
- Duration: August 28 – August 31
- Peak intensity: 35 mph (55 km/h) (1-min); 1013 mbar (hPa)

Around the same time as the previous system dissipated, another tropical wave moved off the coast of Africa on August 26. On August 28 it formed into a tropical depression about 560 mi (900 km) southwest of Cape Verde. Upon developing, the depression had a small area of convection with a spiral rainband, and the NHC anticipated slow strengthening to tropical storm status. With a ridge to the north, the depression maintained a general westward track. Ultimately, the depression failed to organize significantly. By August 29, it had a broad and poorly organized circulation with only scattered convection. Due to cool water temperatures, the system was unable to maintain deep convection, and on August 31 the depression degenerated into a tropical wave about 400 miles (640 km) east of the Lesser Antilles.

=== Hurricane Claudette ===
- Category 4 hurricane (SSHWS)
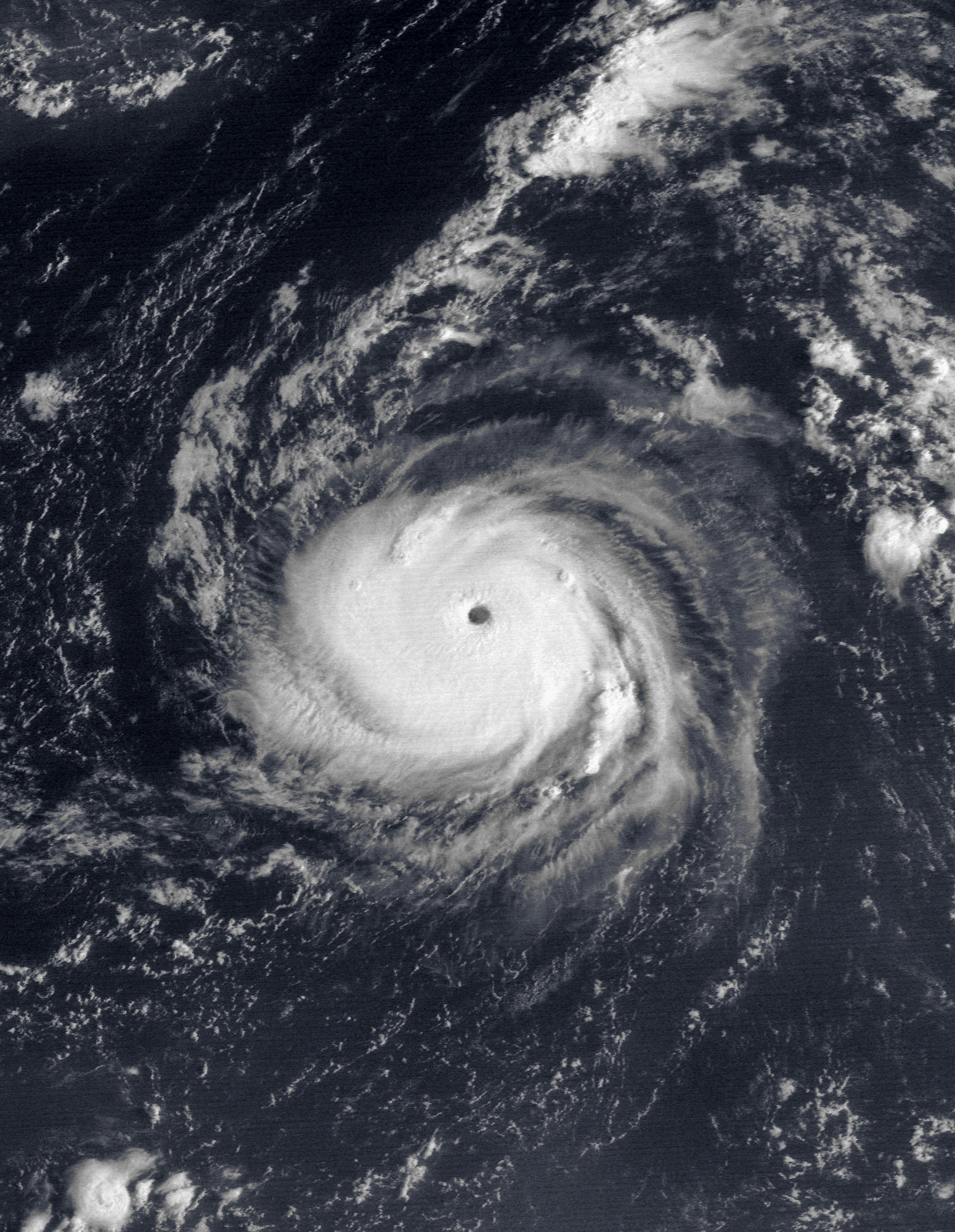
- Duration: September 4 – September 12
- Peak intensity: 130 mph (215 km/h) (1-min); 944 mbar (hPa)

The origins of Claudette were non-tropical, similarly to the other three hurricanes of the season, developing on September 4 about 650 mi (1,050 km) southeast of Bermuda from an upper-level disturbance. Following its formation, it developed slowly while moving southwestward, and on September 5 it intensified into Tropical Storm Claudette. Conditions were favorable for development, with low wind shear and a large anticyclone providing outflow, or the outward wind flow from a storm. On September 6 at 0600 UTC, Claudette attained hurricane status. It underwent rapid intensification, and early on September 7 a reconnaissance flight reported that Claudette attained major hurricane status with winds of 115 mph (185 km/h). Based on satellite estimates, Hurricane Claudette attained its peak intensity with winds of 130 mph (210 km/h) and a minimum pressure 944 mbar (27.9 inHg).

After peaking, Claudette began steady weakening. Around that time, a hurricane watch was issued for the island of Bermuda, which was later upgraded to a warning. The hurricane turned to the northwest, passing 136 miles (219 km) east of Bermuda as a Category 1 hurricane on September 8. Winds on the island peaked at 23 mph (37 km/h), with gusts to 32 mph (51 km/h), and waves reached up to 8 ft (2.4 m) in height. By September 10, Claudette weakened to tropical storm status as it accelerated eastward. The next day it deteriorated further to tropical depression status, and the next day Claudette became extratropical to the southwest of the Azores. It persisted two more days until dissipating over the Azores.

=== Tropical Storm Danny ===
- Tropical storm (SSHWS)
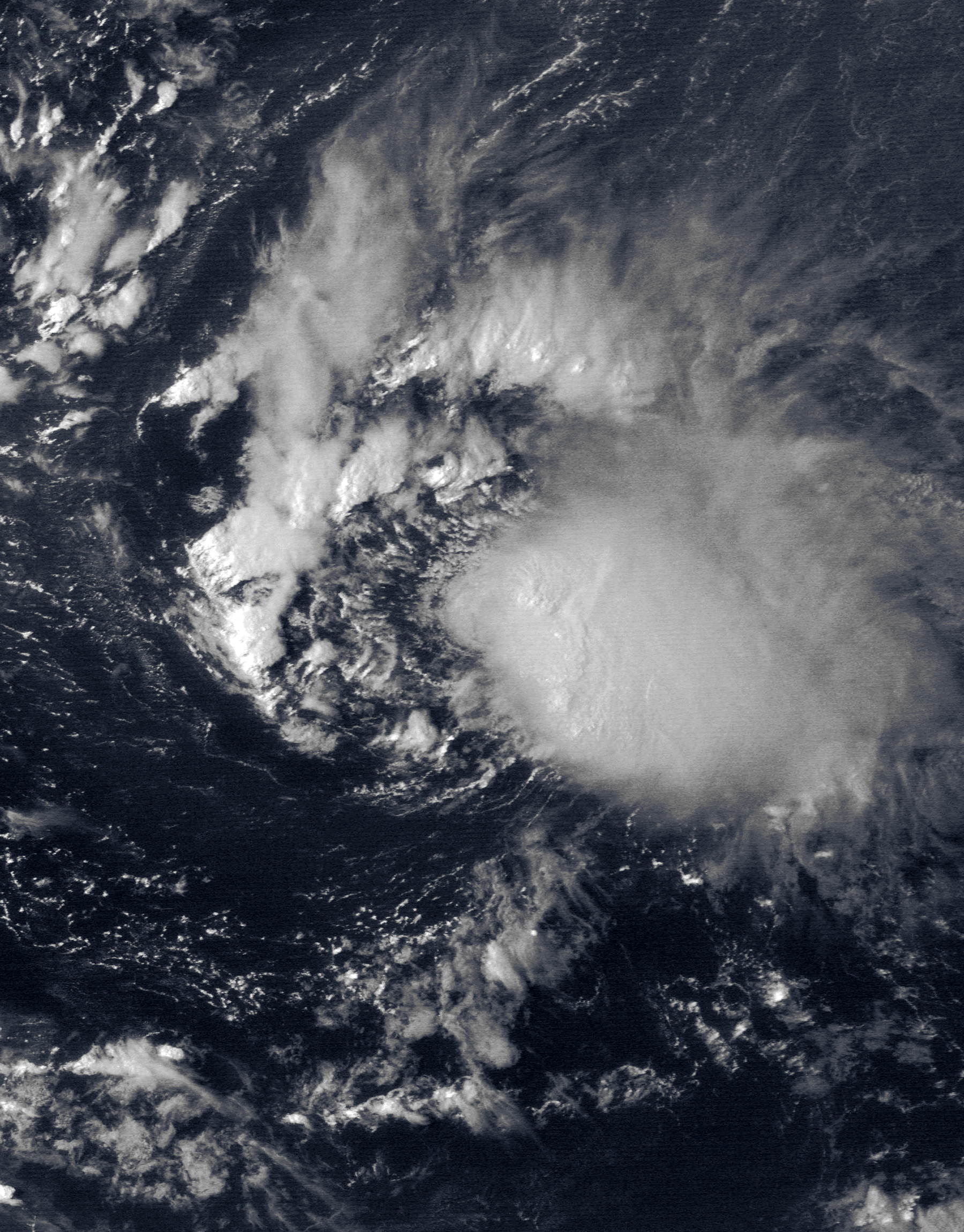
- Duration: September 7 – September 11
- Peak intensity: 50 mph (85 km/h) (1-min); 998 mbar (hPa)

One of the most vigorous tropical waves of the season (which also led to the formation of Hurricane Jimena in the eastern Pacific) was first observed in western Africa on September 2. Three days later it emerged from the coast at Dakar, moving into the tropical Atlantic Ocean with rainbands around its convection. By early on September 7, the system organized into Tropical Depression Seven about 300 mi (480 km) south-southwest of Cape Verde. Upon developing, the depression had a broad circulation, located in an environment generally favorable for intensification. With a strong ridge to the north, the depression tracked steadily westward. After remaining a tropical depression for about 36 hours, the system became better organized and developed well-defined banding features. Based on satellite intensity estimates, the NHC upgraded it to Tropical Storm Danny on September 8.

Upon becoming a tropical storm, only slow strengthening was forecast, due to the presence of an upper-level trough to its west. The storm ultimately reached peak winds of 50 mph (80 km/h), which it maintained for about 36 hours. On September 10 it attained its organizational maximum after developing a central dense overcast. Later that day, an upper-level low increased wind shear over the storm, which exposed the circulation from the deep convection. As Danny approached the Lesser Antilles, it weakened to tropical depression status on September 11. Later that day, a Hurricane Hunters flight was unable to locate a closed circulation, which indicated that Danny degenerated into a tropical wave about 150 mi (240 km) east of the Lesser Antilles. The remnants tracked to the northwest and later to the north before being absorbed by a frontal system.

=== Tropical Storm Erika ===
- Tropical storm (SSHWS)
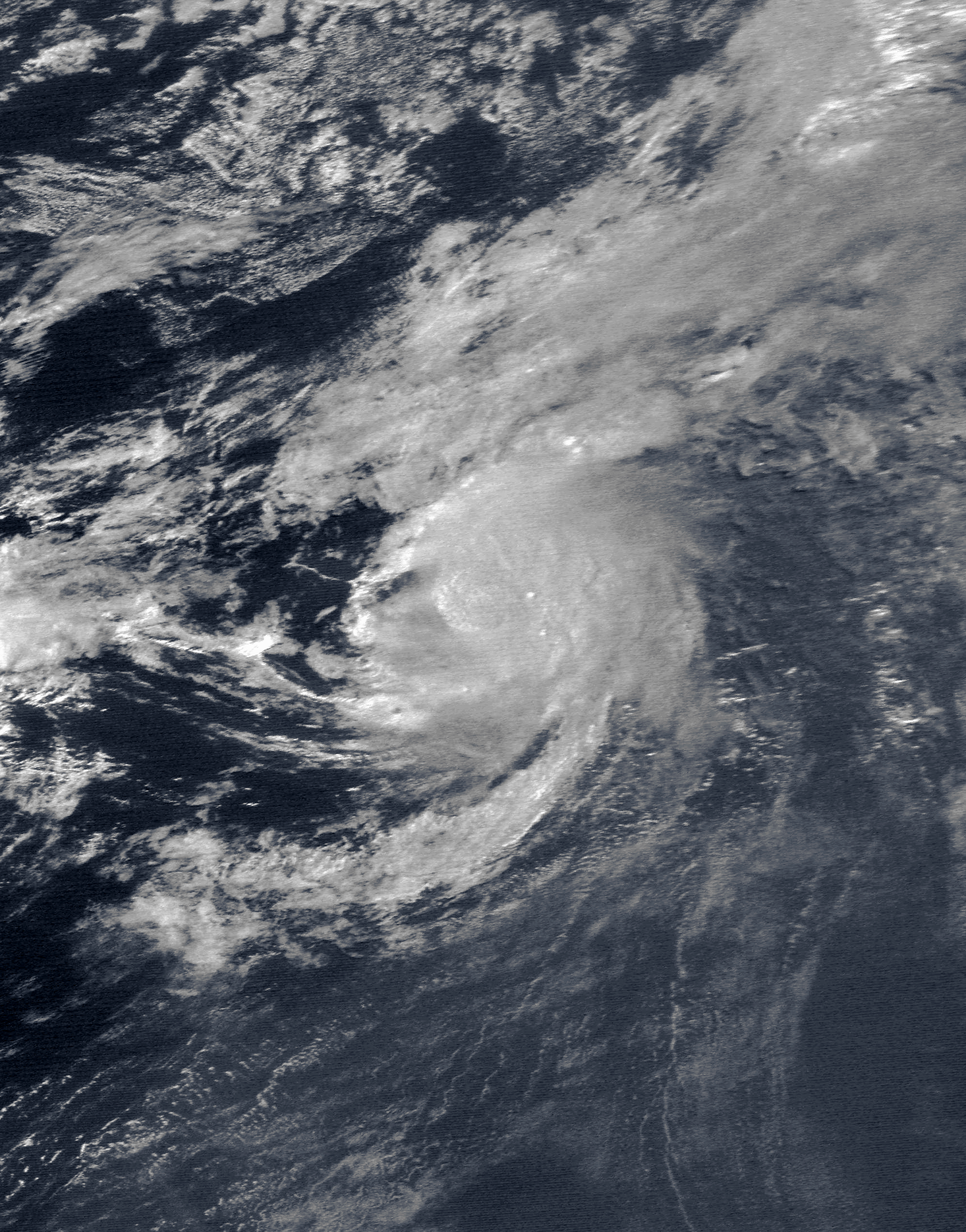
- Duration: September 8 – September 12
- Peak intensity: 60 mph (95 km/h) (1-min); 997 mbar (hPa)

The origins of Tropical Storm Erika were from a tropical wave that exited the coast of Africa on September 2. It moved northwestward, passing through Cape Verde the following day. The system had most of the thunderstorms along the southern portion of the wave as it maintained a very large low-level circulation. Thunderstorms began developing on September 7, and the system organized into Tropical Depression Eight the following day about 920 mi (1,480 km) northeast of the Lesser Antilles; at the same time, it was located about midway between Hurricane Claudette and Tropical Storm Danny. Initially the center was difficult to locate on satellite imagery, but despite the proximity with Claudette, conditions were generally favorable for intensification. By late on September 9, the depression had become much better organized, and based on satellite estimates the NHC upgraded it to Tropical Storm Erika.

Upon becoming a tropical storm, Erika began a motion to the northeast. There was initial uncertainty whether Erika or nearby Claudette would become the dominant system through their interaction. On September 10, the storm developed a central dense overcast as it attained its peak winds of 60 mph (97 km/h). It accelerated east-northeastward toward the Azores along the northern periphery of a ridge, briefly interacting with Claudette. By September 11, the convection had diminished, leaving the center exposed as Erika underwent extratropical transition. Shortly thereafter it passed through the Azores, striking São Miguel Island. Nearby Santa Maria Island reported tropical storm force winds with gusts to 67 mph (108 km/h), prompting the closure of the airfield for several hours. On September 12, Erika weakened to a tropical depression before completing the transition into an extratropical cyclone. It dissipated later that day.

=== Tropical Storm Fabian ===
- Tropical storm (SSHWS)
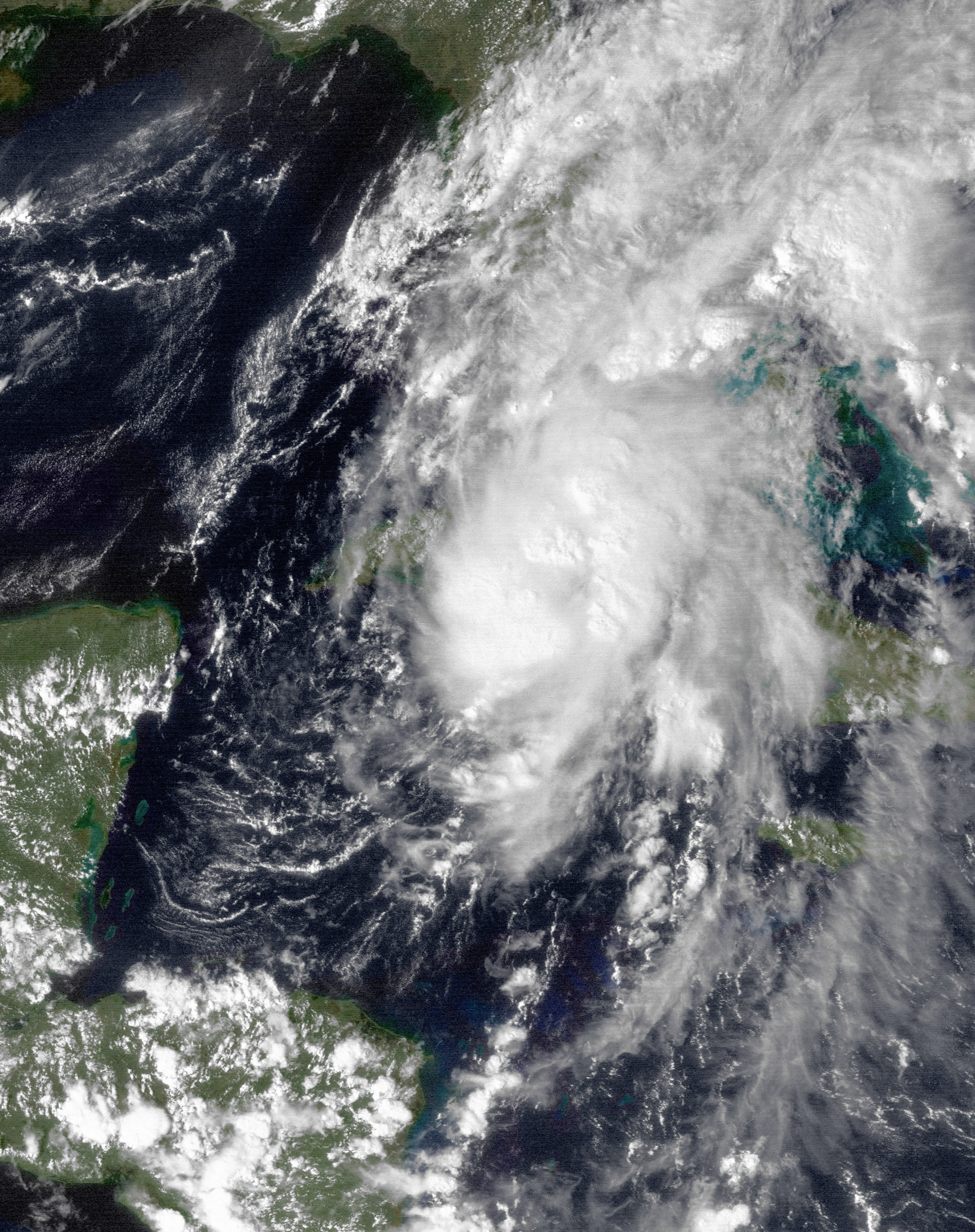
- Duration: October 15 – October 16
- Peak intensity: 45 mph (75 km/h) (1-min); 1002 mbar (hPa)

The origins of Fabian were from a tropical wave and a cold front that entered the northwestern Caribbean Sea on October 12, which produced an area of thunderstorms in the Gulf of Honduras. At 1300 UTC on October 15, a Hurricane Hunters flight observed sustained winds of 40 mph (64 km/h) to the southwest of the Isle of Youth. Based on the report, the NHC designated the system as Tropical Storm Fabian. although the NHC later assessed that the system developed as a tropical depression earlier that day. With a high pressure area to the north, there was already a large pressure gradient that had produced tropical storm force winds over the area. Initially the storm was disorganized, with its strongest winds located primarily east of the center. An eastward-moving upper-level trough imparted a northeast motion as well as unfavorable wind shear. After reaching peak winds of 45 mph (72 km/h), Fabian crossed the Isle of Youth before crossing western Cuba. By early on October 16, the center was becoming difficult to locate as Fabian moved through the Florida Straits. The storm later moved through the Bahamas and became extratropical as it interacted with an approaching front.

When Fabian first formed, the government of Cuba issued a tropical storm warning from Havana to Ciego de Ávila Province, as well as the Isle of Youth. There was also a tropical storm watch for the Florida Keys, as well as a tropical storm warning for the Bahamas. Before the storm hit the Cuban mainland, it produced wind gusts to 40 mph (64 km/h) in Cayo Largo del Sur. Its primary form of impact was from heavy rainfall in a 24‑hour period, peaking at 6.2 inches (160 mm) in Caonao on the south coast of Cuba. In a six-hour period, Punta del Este recorded 5 in (130 mm). Prior to the storm's passage, two state parks were closed in the Florida Keys, and a few storm shelters were opened in Dade County. As it passed east of the state, it dropped rainfall near the coast that peaked at 4.19 in (106 mm) in Conch Key. In the Florida Keys, the National Weather Service Office in Key West recorded sustained winds of 28 mph (45 km/h) with gusts to 32 mph (51 km/h). Only isolated flooding happened from the precursor system to Fabian. In South Florida, Homestead Air Force Base reported rainfall of 3.68 inches (93 mm), but this too was attributed to the precursor frontal system, rather than Fabian itself.

=== Tropical Depression Ten ===
- Tropical depression (SSHWS)
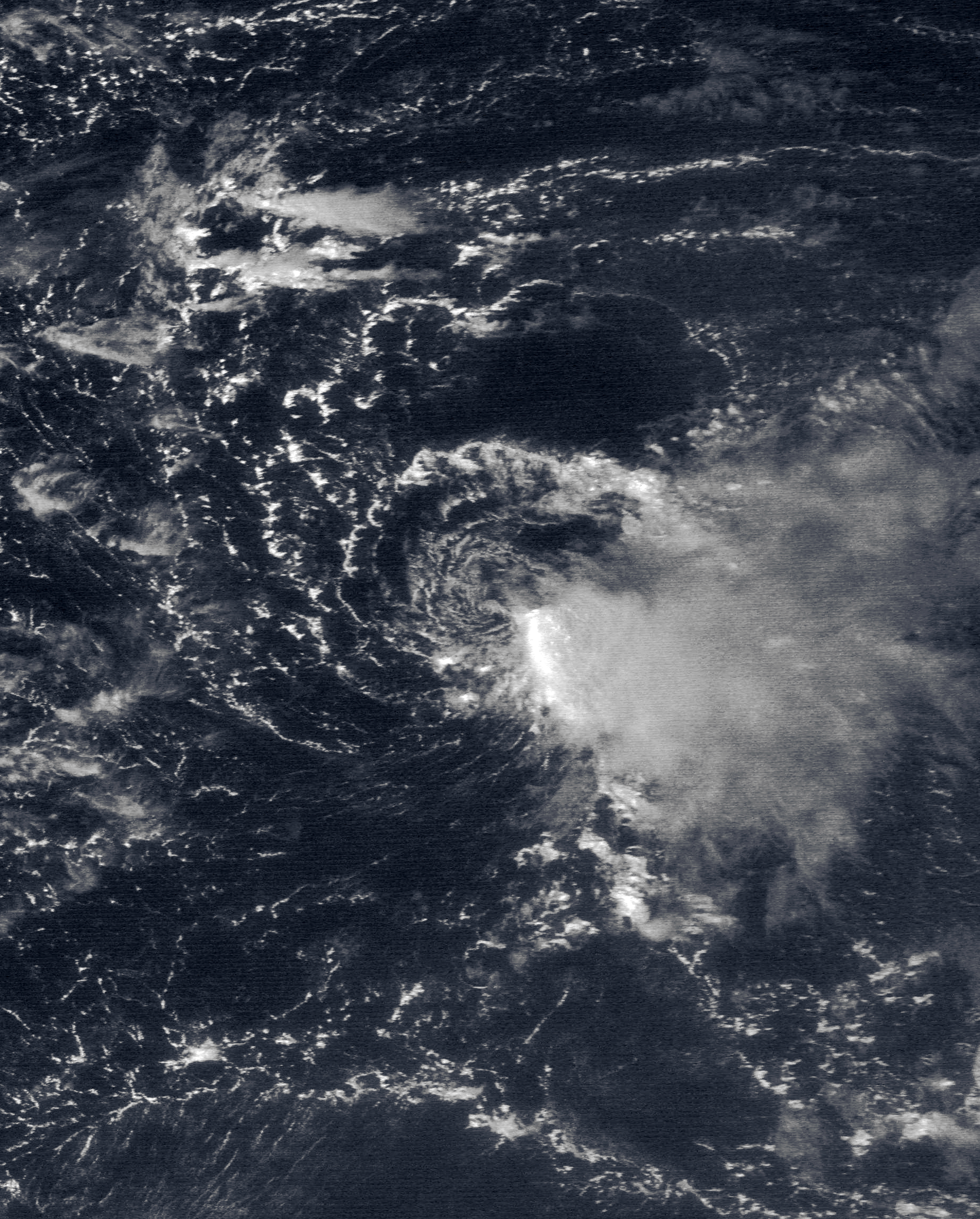
- Duration: October 24 – October 25
- Peak intensity: 30 mph (45 km/h) (1-min); 1009 mbar (hPa)

A tropical wave moved off the coast of Africa on October 19. Moving westward, it developed a weak circulation on October 23. Despite the presence of strong shear, the system was upgraded to a tropical depression at 2200 UTC on October 24 about 1,100 miles (1,800 km) east of the Lesser Antilles. This was based on a rating of 1.5 on the Dvorak technique, which is a method of estimating the intensity of tropical cyclones via satellite. At the time of development, the depression had a small area of convection near and east of the center, and due to the wind shear it was never expected to intensify. By October 25, the circulation had become dissociated from the convection. The depression dissipated soon after without affecting land.

=== Hurricane Grace ===
- Category 2 hurricane (SSHWS)
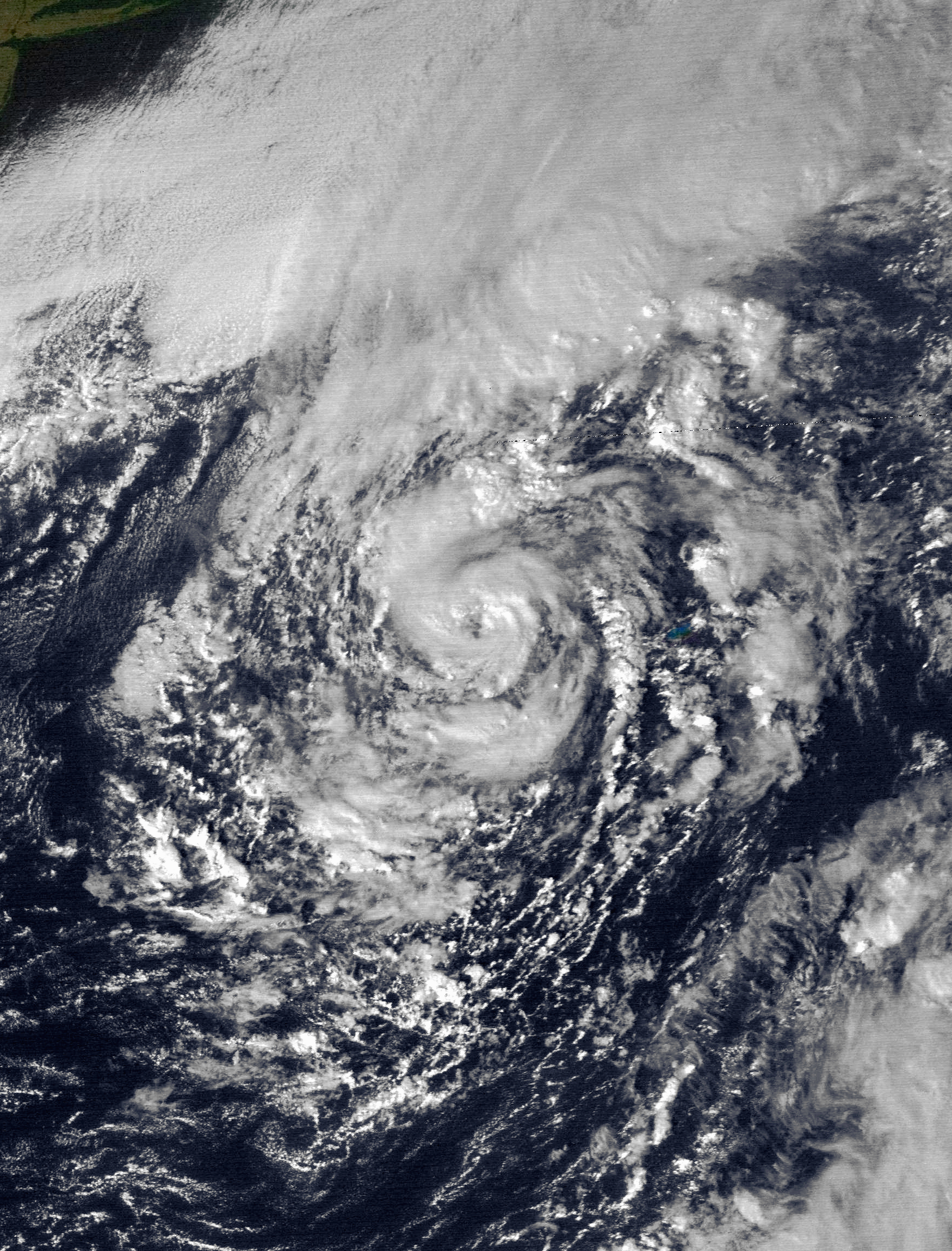
- Duration: October 25 – October 29
- Peak intensity: 105 mph (165 km/h) (1-min); 980 mbar (hPa)

A mid-level area of low pressure formed on October 23 south of Bermuda. The low became a surface feature on October 25 and developed into a subtropical storm on October 26. An area of clouds near Bermuda became increasingly convective, and gradually became entrained into the expanding and developing circulation of the subtropical storm. Thunderstorm activity persisted near the center, and on October 27, the system was upgraded to Tropical Storm Grace. Grace continued to organize and intensify, and was upgraded to a Category 1 hurricane on the Saffir–Simpson scale. The hurricane tracked generally northwestward until October 28. On that day, an extratropical cyclone off the New England coast rapidly intensified and influenced Grace's steering currents, turning the hurricane sharply east. At around the same time, an eye feature associated with Hurricane Grace became apparent on satellite imagery, despite a lack of strong convective activity around the storm's center. Grace accelerated as it continued eastward. It reached its peak intensity with winds of 105 mph (165 km/h) and a minimum central barometric pressure of 980 mbar (hPa; 28.94 inHg) as a Category 2 hurricane on October 29. However, the storm's rapid forward movement led to an asymmetrical circulation. The center passed approximately 50 mi (80 km) south of Bermuda before turning northeast. The rapidly approaching extratropical storm undermined the storm's lower-level center. Subsequently, Grace lost its status as a tropical system. Afterward, Grace moved north along the front and was completely absorbed by the passing extratropical storm to the north on October 30. The nor'easter significantly strengthened as a result of the temperature contrast between the cold air to the northwest and the warmth and humidity associated with the remnants of Hurricane Grace. The nor'easter that absorbed Grace later became commonly known as "The Perfect Storm".

A hurricane warning was issued for Bermuda. The island experienced squally weather, with precipitation peaking at 3.21 in (82 mm). Off the Virginia coast, nine people were rescued from a yacht after encountering strong winds and rough seas. Grace generated swells of at least 15 ft (4.6 m) along the East Coast of the United States, leading to minor beach erosion. Carolina Beach, North Carolina lost about 1 ft (0.30 m) of sand.

=== Unnamed hurricane ===
- Category 1 hurricane (SSHWS)
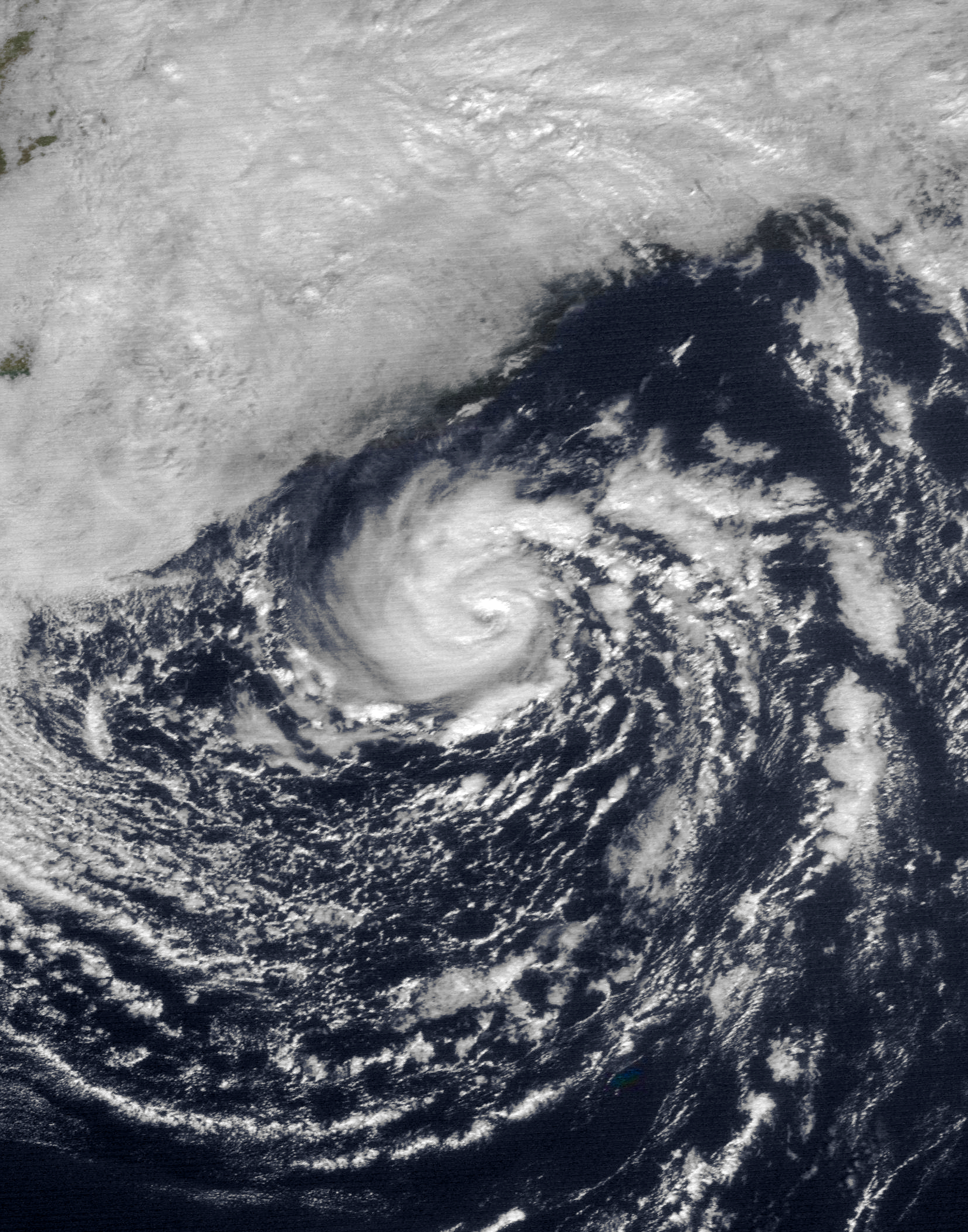
- Duration: October 31 – November 2
- Peak intensity: 75 mph (120 km/h) (1-min); 980 mbar (hPa)

The precursor of the season's final storm was a strong extratropical cyclone commonly known as the Perfect Storm. It evolved from an area of low pressure that developed off Atlantic Canada on October 28. The system moved southward and westward due to a ridge to its north, and reached its peak intensity. The storm lashed the East Coast of the United States with high waves and coastal flooding, before turning to the southwest and weakening. Moving over warmer waters, the system transitioned into a subtropical cyclone before becoming a tropical storm. It executed a loop off the Mid-Atlantic states and turned toward the northeast. On November 1 the system evolved into a full-fledged hurricane with peak winds of 75 mph (120 km/h). The tropical system weakened, striking Nova Scotia as a tropical storm before dissipating.

Damage totaled over $200 million (1991 USD) and the death toll was thirteen. Most of the damage occurred while the storm was extratropical, after waves up to 30 ft (9.1 m) struck the coastline from Canada to Florida and southeastward to Puerto Rico. In Massachusetts, where damage was heaviest, over 100 homes were destroyed or severely damaged. To the north, more than 100 homes were affected in Maine, including the vacation home of George H. W. Bush, the president at the time. More than 38,000 people were left without power, and along the coast high waves inundated roads and buildings. In portions of New England, damage was worse than had occurred from Hurricane Bob two months prior. However, aside from tidal flooding along rivers, the storm's effects were primarily along the coastline. A buoy off the coast of Nova Scotia reported a wave height of 100.7 ft (30.7 m), the highest ever recorded in the province's offshore waters. In the middle of the storm, the Andrea Gail sunk, claiming the lives of its crew of six, which later inspired the book as well as the movie The Perfect Storm. Off the coast of New York, a Coast Guard helicopter ran out of fuel and crashed, and although four members of its crew were rescued, one was killed. Two people died after their boat sank off Staten Island. High waves swept a person to their death in both Rhode Island and Puerto Rico, and another person was blown off a bridge in New York. The tropical cyclone that formed late in the storm's duration caused little impact, limited to power outages and slick roads; one person was killed in Newfoundland from a traffic accident related to the storm.

== Storm names ==
The following list of names was used for named storms that formed in the North Atlantic in 1991. This is the same list used for the 1985 season, with the exception of the names Erika and Grace, which replaced the names Elena and Gloria after that season. Both Erika and Grace were used for the first time in 1991.

- Ana
- Bob
- Claudette
- Danny
- Erika
- Fabian
- Grace
- Henri (unused)
- Isabel (unused)
- Juan (unused)
- Kate (unused)
- Larry (unused)
- Mindy (unused)
- Nicholas (unused)
- Odette (unused)
- Peter (unused)
- Rose (unused)
- Sam (unused)
- Teresa (unused)
- Victor (unused)
- Wanda (unused)

- Additionally, the October 1991 Perfect Storm later evolved into a hurricane; the National Hurricane Center left it unnamed due to the heavy damage and media interest in the predecessor extratropical storm.

=== Retirement ===
The World Meteorological Organization retired the name Bob from the Atlantic hurricane name lists following the 1991 season due to its high impact. The name was replaced with Bill for the 1997 season.

== Season effects ==
This is a table of all of the storms that formed in the 1991 Atlantic hurricane season. It includes their name, duration, peak classification and intensities, areas affected, damage, and death totals. Deaths in parentheses are additional and indirect (an example of an indirect death would be a traffic accident), but were still related to that storm. Damage and deaths include totals while the storm was extratropical, a wave, or a low, and all of the damage figures are in 1991 USD.

Saffir–Simpson scale
TD	TS	C1	C2	C3	C4	C5

1991 North Atlantic tropical cyclone season statistics
Storm name	Dates active	Storm category at peak intensity	Max 1-min wind mph (km/h)	Min. press. (mbar)	Areas affected	Damage (US$)	Deaths	Ref(s).
Ana	July 2 – 5	Tropical storm	50 (85)	1000	South Carolina, Florida, Southeastern United States	Minimal	None	
Two	July 5 – 7	Tropical depression	35 (55)	1007	Mexico	Unknown	None	
Bob	August 16 – 20	Category 3 hurricane	115 (185)	950	North Carolina, Mid-Atlantic States, New England, Atlantic Canada, Iberian Peninsula	$1.47 billion	15 (2)	
Four	August 24 – 26	Tropical depression	35 (55)	1009	None	None	None	
Five	August 28 – 31	Tropical depression	35 (55)	1013	None	None	None	
Claudette	September 4 – 14	Category 4 hurricane	130 (215)	944	Bermuda	Minimal	None	
Danny	September 7 – 11	Tropical storm	50 (85)	998	None	None	None	
Erika	September 8 – 12	Tropical storm	60 (95)	997	None	None	None	
Fabian	October 15 – 16	Tropical storm	45 (75)	1002	Cuba, Florida	Minimal	None	
Ten	October 24 – 25	Tropical depression	30 (45)	1009	None	None	None	
Grace	October 25 – 29	Category 2 hurricane	105 (165)	980	Bermuda	None	None	
Unnamed	October 31 – November 2	Category 1 hurricane	75 (120)	972	East Coast of the United States, Atlantic Canada	$200 million	13	
Season aggregates
11 systems	July 2 – November 2		130 (215)	944		~$1.68 billion	30	

== See also ==
- Tropical cyclones in 1991
- 1991 Pacific hurricane season
- 1991 Pacific typhoon season
- 1991 North Indian Ocean cyclone season
- South-West Indian Ocean cyclone season: 1990–91, 1991–92
- Australian region cyclone season: 1990–91, 1991–92
- South Pacific cyclone season: 1990–91, 1991–92
- South Atlantic tropical cyclone
- Mediterranean tropical-like cyclone
