= 1994 Pacific typhoon season =

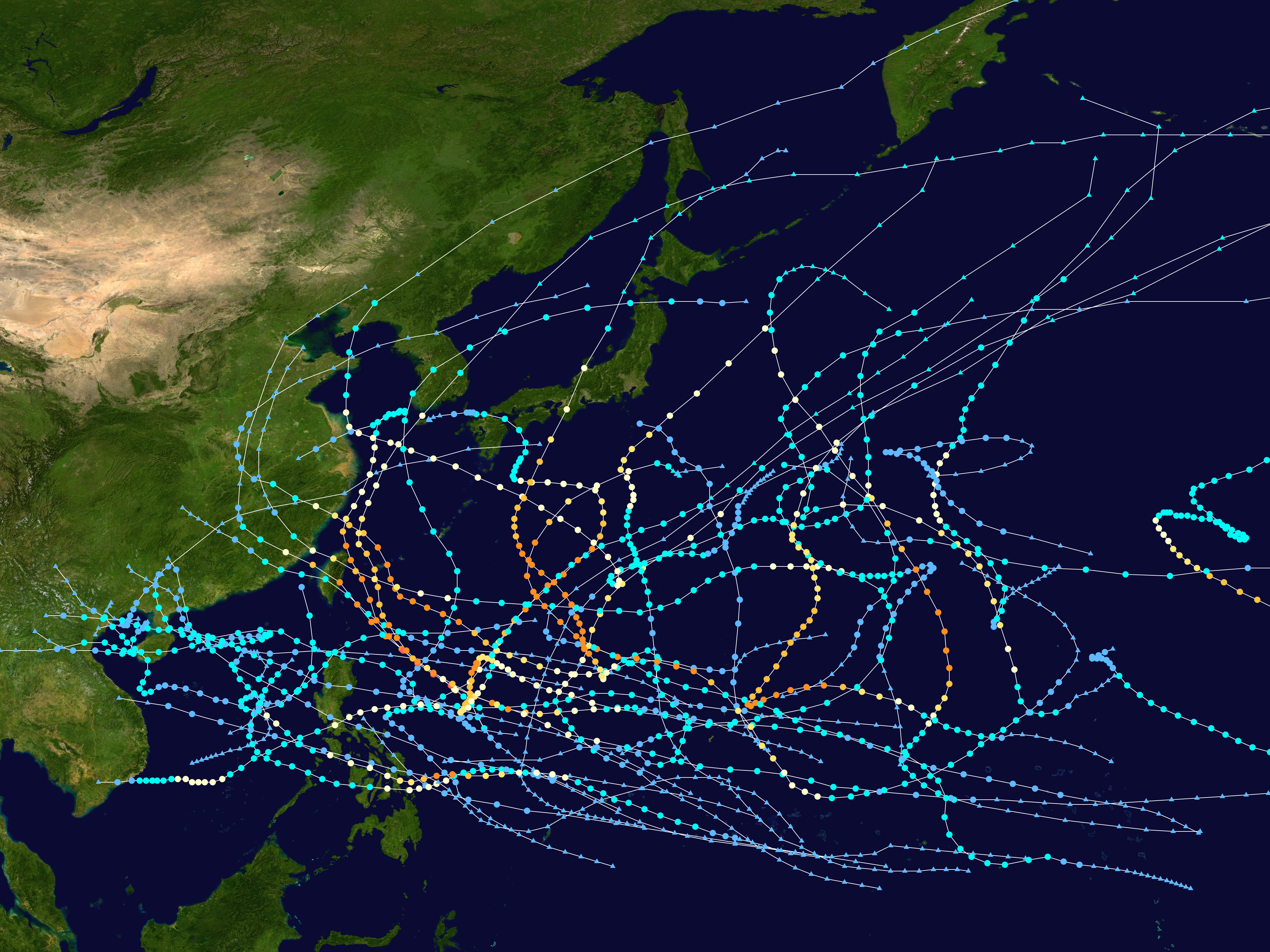
- Season summary map

Seasonal boundaries
- First system formed: January 4, 1994
- Last system dissipated: December 27, 1994

Strongest storm
- Name: Melissa & Seth
  - Maximum winds: 205 km/h (125 mph) (10-minute sustained)
  - Lowest pressure: 910 hPa (mbar)

Seasonal statistics
- Total depressions: 52
- Total storms: 36
- Typhoons: 20
- Very strong typhoons: 10
- Violent typhoons: 3
- ACE: 454.6 units
- Total fatalities: 3,407 total
- Total damage: $8.53 billion (1994 USD)

Related articles
- 1994 Atlantic hurricane season; 1994 Pacific hurricane season; 1994 North Indian Ocean cyclone season

The 1994 Pacific typhoon season was the seventh and final consecutive to have above average tropical cyclone activity. It was an extremely active season, becoming the second most active season ever recorded in the basin, only behind 1964. With a total of 36 tropical storms, where 20 of them reached typhoon strength and 6 further strengthening into super typhoons, during the course of the season, much like the Pacific hurricane season. The season had no official bounds and it ran year-round in 1994, but most tropical cyclones tend to form in the northwestern Pacific Ocean between May and October. Tropical storms that formed west of the date line were assigned a name by the Joint Typhoon Warning Center. The World Meteorological Organization-designated Regional Specialized Meteorological Centre for tropical cyclones for the region is the Japan Meteorological Agency. Tropical depressions that entered or formed in the Philippine area of responsibility were assigned a name by the Philippine Atmospheric, Geophysical and Astronomical Services Administration or PAGASA. This can result in some storms having two names.

The season started on January 4 with the formation of Tropical Depression 01W to the west of Yap, with the first tropical storm developing a few months later on April 1, and ended near the end of the year when Tropical Storm Bobbie dissipated in the open Pacific on December 25. During the season, 25 systems either threatened land or made landfall, killing over 2,400 people. The strongest storm of the season was Super Typhoon Doug, which affected Taiwan, South Korea and mainland China, while the deadliest storm was Super Typhoon Fred, which killed over 1,000 people in China. Earlier in the season, the combined effects of two tropical storms —Russ and Sharon —caused flooding in China that killed over 1,400. The season also saw two storms, Li and John, cross into the Western North Pacific from the east, while one storm, Tropical Storm Yuri, formed from a precursor low that had similarly crossed the International Date Line. This season, PAGASA named 25 systems and had to use an auxiliary list to name some of them after running out of names from their standard list. Of the 25, three systems were not tracked by the Joint Typhoon Warning Center.

== Season summary ==
Most storms in a singular Pacific typhoon season (1955–present)
Year	Tropical storms	Typhoons	
Year	Tropical storms	Typhoons	Super typhoons
1964	39	26 (record high)	7
1994	36	20	6
1971	35	24	6
1965	35	21	11 (record high; tied with 1997)
1961	35	20	8
1967	35	20	5
2026	32	14	7
1989	32	20	5
1974	32	16	0 (record low)
1992	31	16	5
1955	31	20	4
2013	31	13	5
Note: Data begins at the year 1955 due to earlier data being increasingly unreliable. Totals for tropical storms and typhoons are from the Japan Meteorological Agency, and totals for the unofficial super typhoon category are from the Joint Typhoon Warning Center.

There were 41 tropical cyclones during 1994 in the Western North Pacific; 39 formed within the area while two, Tropical Storm Li and Typhoon John, formed in the Eastern North Pacific (east of longitude 140°W) and crossed the date line to enter this basin. Of the 39, 34 became tropical storms and were named, of which 17 became typhoons. The season started on January 4 with the formation of Tropical Depression One-W to the west of Yap, with the first tropical storm developing a few months later on April 1. The season ended late in the year after Tropical Storm Bobbie dissipated in the open Pacific on December 25.

During the season, 25 systems either threatened land or made landfall, with eight striking the Philippines, eight moving into China, six moving into Vietnam, and three striking Taiwan and China. A total of over 2,400 people perished during the season. The strongest storm of the season was Super Typhoon Doug, which affected Taiwan, South Korea and mainland China, while the deadliest storm was Super Typhoon Fred, which killed over 1,000 people in China. Earlier in the season, the combined effects of two tropical storms — Russ and Sharon — caused flooding in China that killed over 1,400. The season also saw two storms, Li and John, cross into the Western North Pacific from the east, while one storm, Tropical Storm Yuri, formed from a precursor low that had similarly crossed the International Date Line. Hong Kong received 28 percent of its annual rainfall from tropical cyclones this season, which was slightly above normal.

== Systems ==
=== Tropical Depression 01W (Akang) ===
- Tropical depression (JMA)
- Tropical depression (SSHWS)
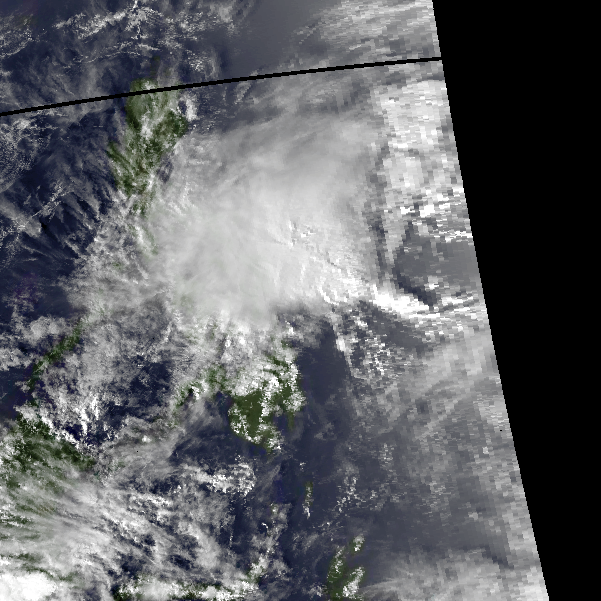
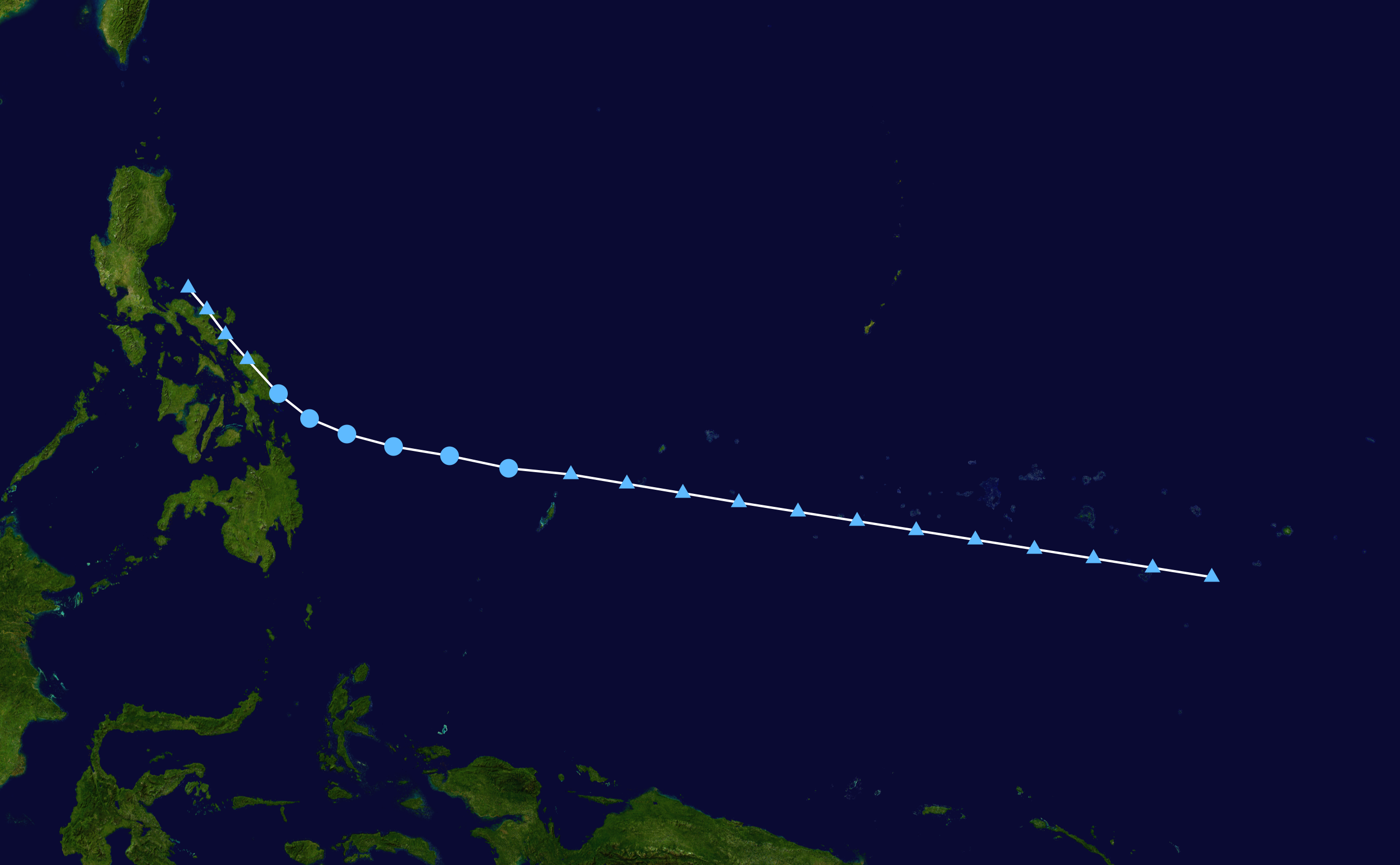
- Duration: January 4 – January 5
- Peak intensity: 55 km/h (35 mph) (10-min); 1004 hPa (mbar)

The first tropical depression of the year was first observed as a poorly organized area of clouds, within a trough of low pressure near the Caroline Islands during January 1. The system subsequently moved towards the north-northwest, while atmospheric convection surrounding the system organized further. As a result of this organization and a weather station on Chuuk island reporting wind speeds of 55 km/h (35 mph), the JTWC issued a Tropical Cyclone Formation Alert on the system during January 2. However the system did not become a significant tropical cyclone during January 3, as it was not able to sustain its convective organization. The system was subsequently classified as a tropical depression on January 4 while the system was about 600 km (370 mi), west of Yap.

Tropical Depression 01W made landfall on Samar Island in the Philippines on the evening of January 5, following which the depression started to weaken. The final warning was issued early on January 6 after the system lost all its deep convection. A total of 35 to 45 deaths were reported, with over 69 million Philippine pesos (1994 pesos) or $2.4 million (1994 USD) in damage reported. It caused a major flood event in the Philippines. A total of at least 16,000 people had to take refuge in government-run shelters during and after the storm.

=== Typhoon Owen (Bising) ===
- Severe tropical storm (JMA)
- Category 1 typhoon (SSHWS)
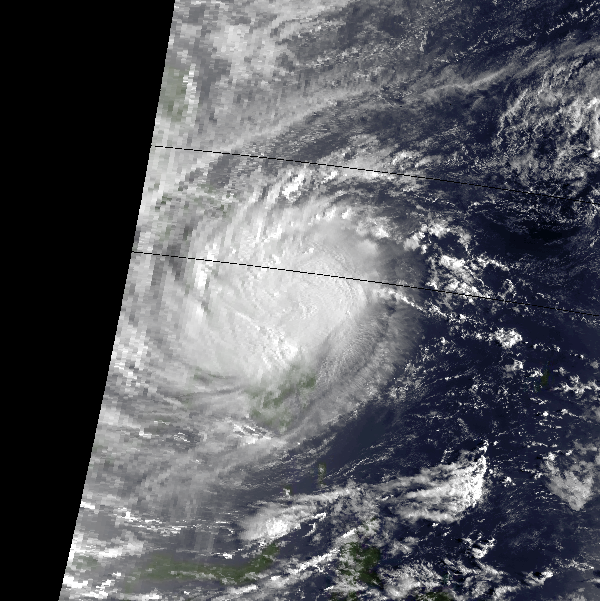
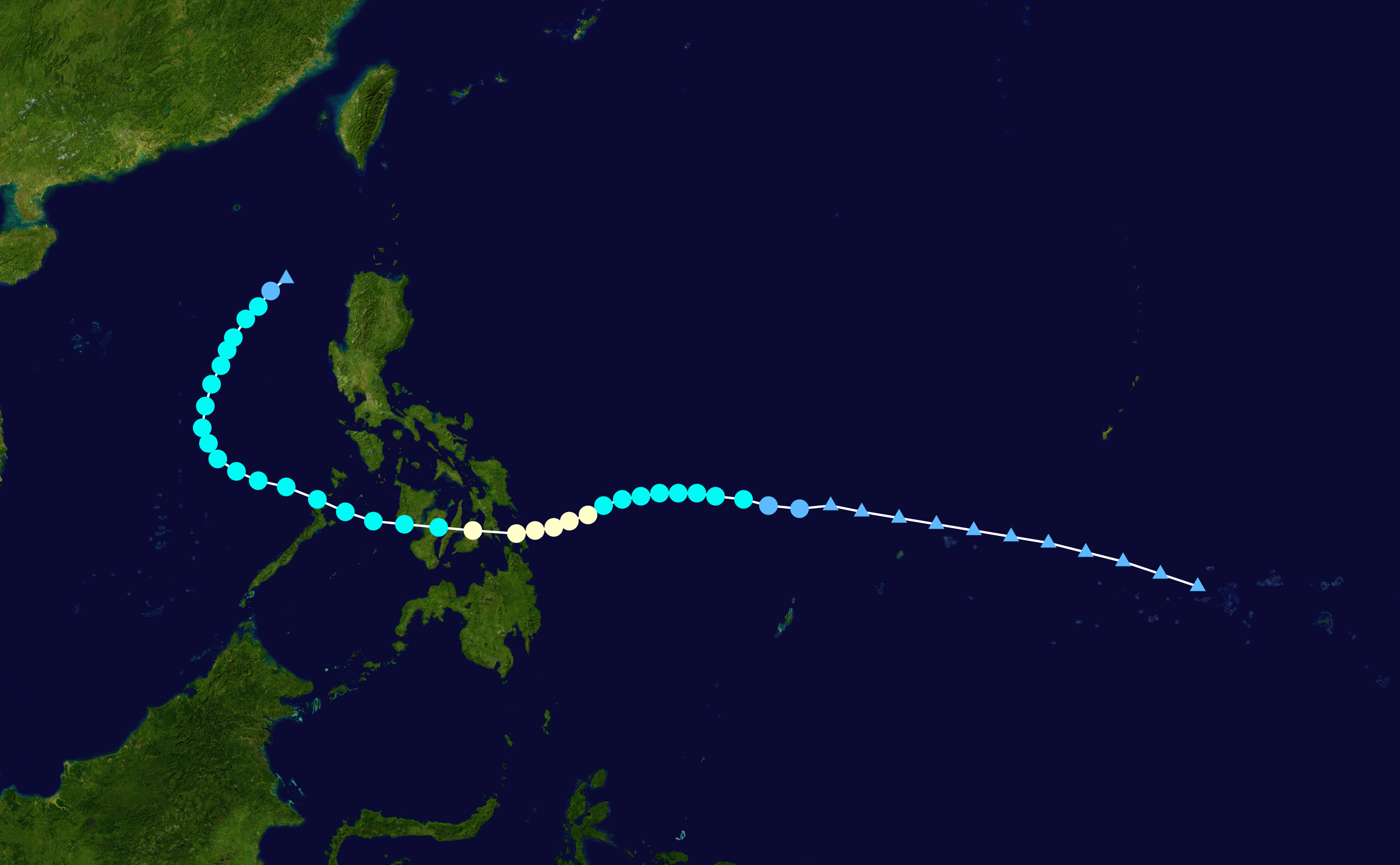
- Duration: March 31 – April 9
- Peak intensity: 110 km/h (70 mph) (10-min); 980 hPa (mbar)

Typhoon Owen formed from a tropical disturbance which was originally identified within a near-equatorial trough over Micronesia. The disturbance was first mentioned by the Joint Typhoon Warning Center on March 29. By March 31, a distinct area within the trough showing signs of cyclonic spin appeared, and the JTWC initiated advisories on Tropical Depression 02W soon afterwards. Meanwhile, the Japan Meteorological Agency classified the system as a tropical storm, Tropical Storm 9401. It was located about 420 kilometres (260 mi) west-northwest of Yap.

Owen continued to strengthen, with the JMA classifying it a severe tropical storm on April 3. According to the JTWC, Owen reached typhoon intensity at the same time the JMA classified it a severe tropical storm. The storm tracked southwest to west-southwestward, and reached its peak intensity of 75 knots (139 km/h) from the JTWC (60 knots (110 km/h) from the JMA) on April 4, shortly before landfall between Leyte and Mindanao. A reading taken late on April 3 at Guiuan on Samar reported sustained winds of 45 knots (83 km/h). It weakened to a tropical storm overland, before it restrengthened slightly after emerging into the South China Sea. A drilling rig reported 50 knots (93 km/h) sustained winds. Soon afterwards, the cyclone dissipated over water northwest of Luzon on April 9.

Owen's west-southwestward track shortly before landfall was rare. Owen was one of just two April typhoons in the previous 36 years — the other being Typhoon Wanda of the 1971 season – to make landfall while moving west-southwestward. Owen's later recurvature in the South China Sea was also unusual; it recurved at a latitude of only about 13°N, about 3° south of the average latitude for recurvature in the South China Sea in April.

Owen's impact on the Philippines was widespread, with nine provinces being declared under a "state of calamity" by President of the Philippines Fidel Ramos. At least 10 people were killed with 5 others missing, and a further 14 fishermen feared drowned. A total of 33 were reported wounded. Over 9000 families were affected by Owen.

In Okinawa, heavy rains were reported on Yonaguni, with a total reported precipitation amount of 313 millimetres (12.3 in). The peak winds measured at Yonaguni in association with Typhoon Owen were 32.4 kilometres per hour (17.5 kn).

=== Typhoon Page (Klaring) ===
- Typhoon (JMA)
- Category 2 typhoon (SSHWS)
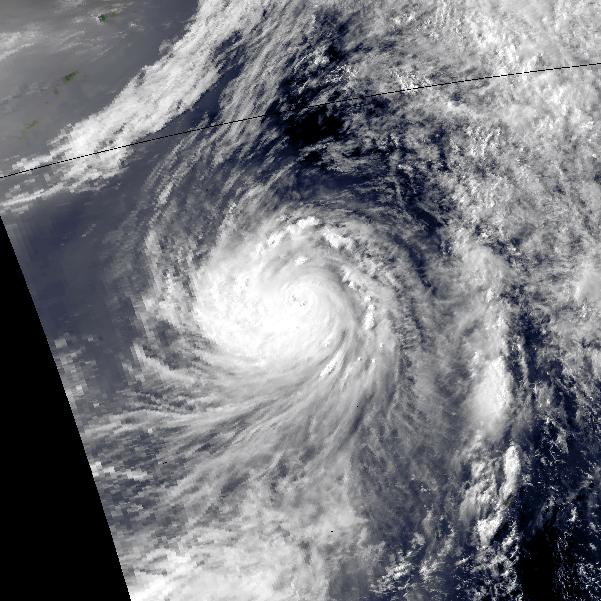
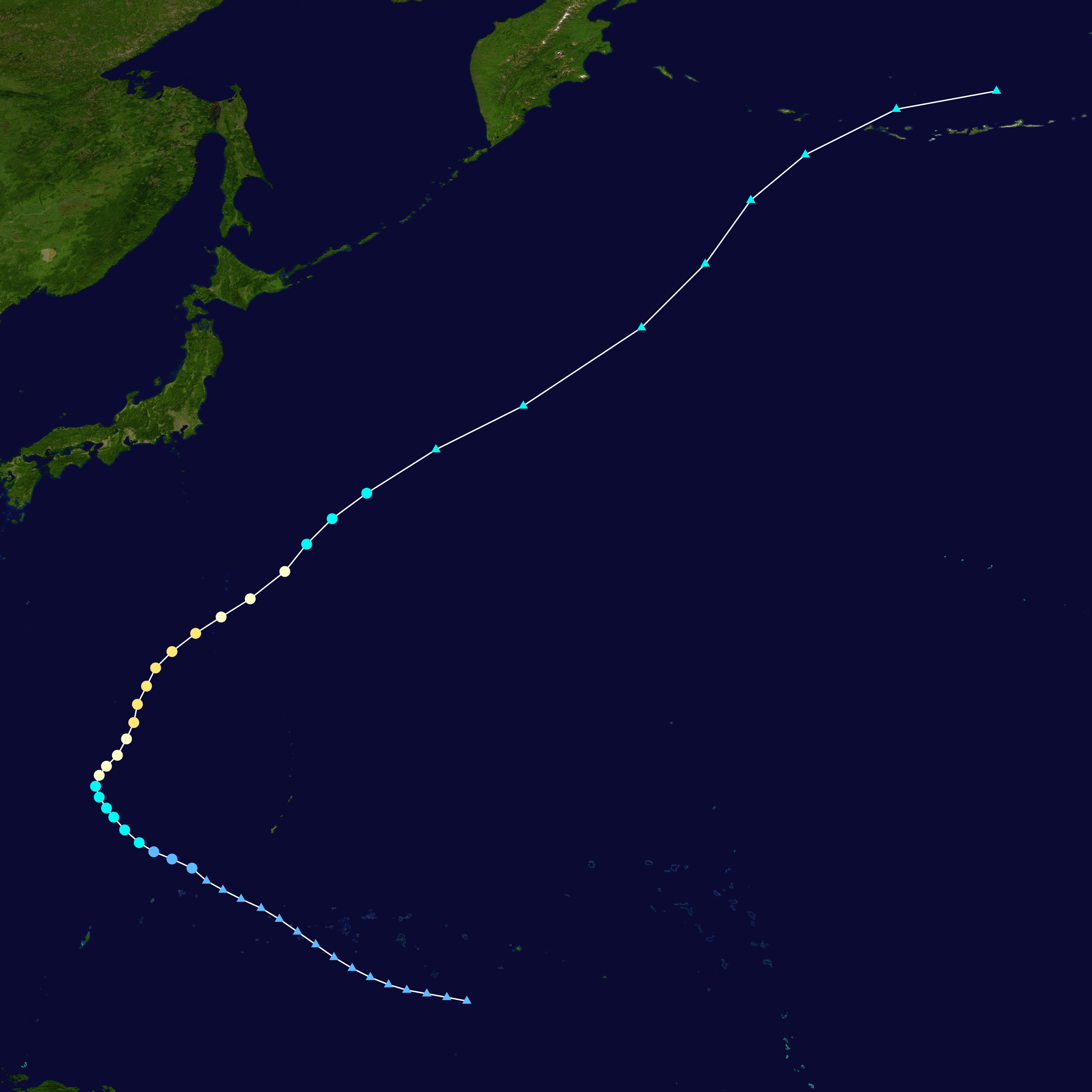
- Duration: May 12 – May 17
- Peak intensity: 130 km/h (80 mph) (10-min); 965 hPa (mbar)

On May 8, a large increase in deep convection associated with near-equatorial troughs was noted in the eastern Caroline Islands. By the next morning, visible satellite imagery showed an increase in organization of the deep convection associated with the system, and synoptic reports from buoys confirmed that a low-level circulation centre was present near 5°N 153°E. Slow development ensued, and the system was upgraded to a tropical depression on May 12. At the same time, the Japan Meteorological Agency began tracking the system, about 510 kilometres (320 mi) west-southwest of Guam.

Page moved on a northwestward track for the next couple days while slowly strengthening. Page was upgraded to a tropical storm by the JTWC late on May 12, when it was located 500 kilometres (310 mi) north of Yap, while the JMA first considered the system a tropical storm on May 13. Late on May 13, Page suddenly slowed in forward speed and began turning to the northeast. On May 14, Page became a typhoon. However, the JMA did not follow suit until 30 hours later. Page reached its maximum intensity of 90 knots (170 km/h) and minimum pressure of 965 hectopascals (28.5 inHg) thirty hours after passing the point of recurvature. Final warnings were issued by both the JTWC and the JMA early on May 18, as it began extratropical transition around 960 kilometres (600 mi) east-southeast of Tokyo.

Page had the largest average track forecast errors of all the typhoons in 1994, mainly due to failures in expecting its recurvature. Furthermore, Page's late attainment of maximum intensity, at 30 hours after point of recurvature, is not common. Between 1978 and 1993, only seven of 77 typhoons attained peak intensity more than 24 hours after recurving.

Large waves and high tides generated by Page affected the western Mariana Islands. A few tourists had to be rescued from high surf and strong currents on Guam. Minimal rainfall was recorded in Japan, the highest recorded total was 29 millimetres (1.1 in) in Kumagaya, Saitama. At Mount Tsukuba, a maximum sustained wind speed of 58 kilometres per hour (31 kn) was recorded.

=== Tropical Depression 04W (Deling) ===
- Tropical depression (JMA)
- Tropical depression (SSHWS)
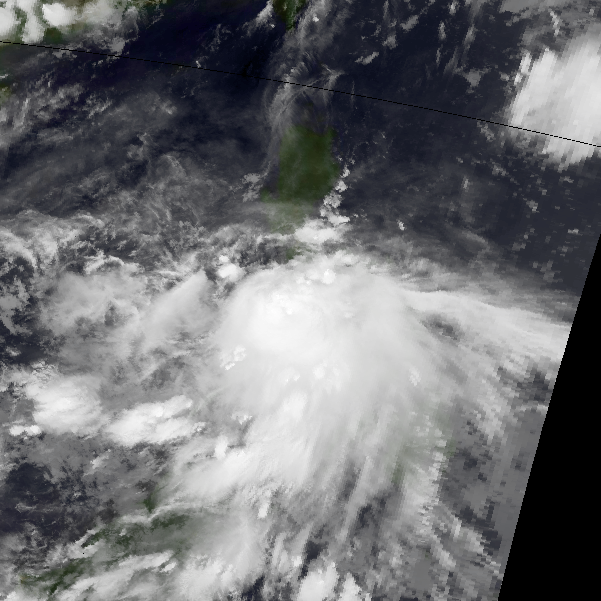
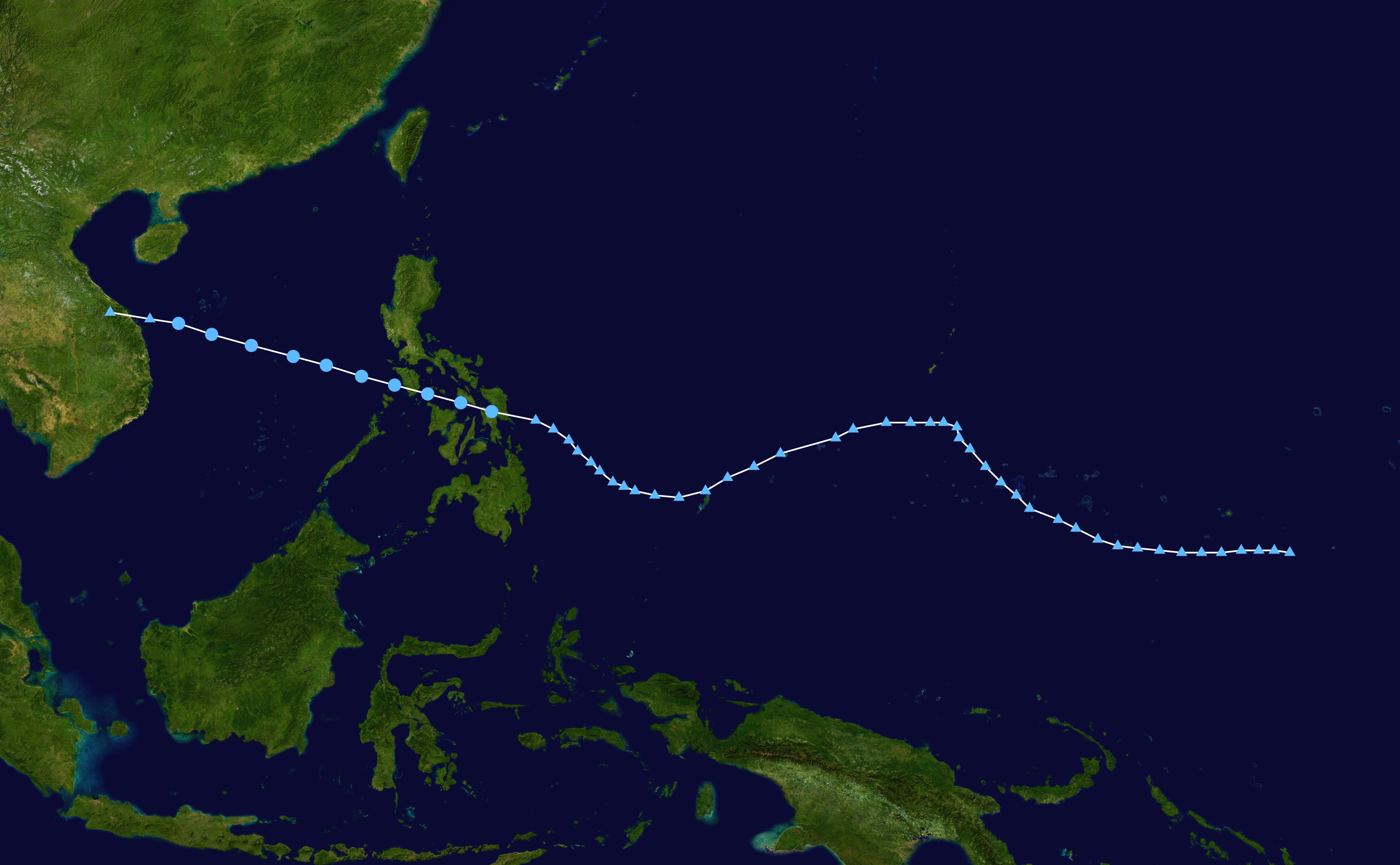
- Duration: May 25 – May 26
- Peak intensity: 55 km/h (35 mph) (10-min); 1004 hPa (mbar)

On May 14, an area of deep convection associated with a weak cyclonic circulation near Kosrae was mentioned in the JTWC's 0600 UTC Significant Tropical Weather Advisory. For the next five days, this weak circulation tracked west-northwestward in the direction of Guam, before turning to the west-southwest, but convection failed to consolidate near the centre during this time. After passing close to Palau on May 21, it turned northwest and entered the Philippine Sea, and was named Deling by PAGASA early on May 23 local time. Shortly after, SSM/I imagery indicated the presence of a well-defined low-level circulation centre, and visible and infrared satellite images indicated an increase in organisation of the system and a consolidation of deep convection near the centre. Based on this, a Tropical Cyclone Formation Alert was issued by the JTWC at 0600 UTC.

The first warning was issued a day later when the amount of deep convection near the centre increased as the depression neared the Philippines. While over the Philippine islands, a large mesoscale convective system (MCS) developed near the centre of the tropical depression, something that would occur again later while the system was west of Luzon. Soon after the second MCS weakened, the system made landfall in central Vietnam on May 26, and quickly dissipated when inland. The Hong Kong Observatory tracked this system as a weak tropical depression from May 25 UTC when it was about 520 km (320 mi) southeast of Xisha for about 24 hours before it dissipated.

According to press reports, over 2,000 people were forced to evacuate from Davao City, despite no reports of significantly high winds or low pressures, as the system caused heavy rainfall that produced heavy flooding that killed five people and left at least one person missing.

=== Tropical Storm Russ (Emang) ===
- Severe tropical storm (JMA)
- Tropical storm (SSHWS)
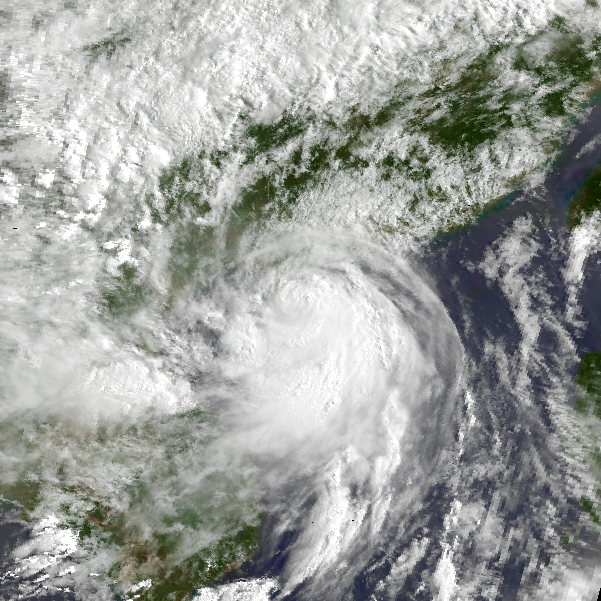
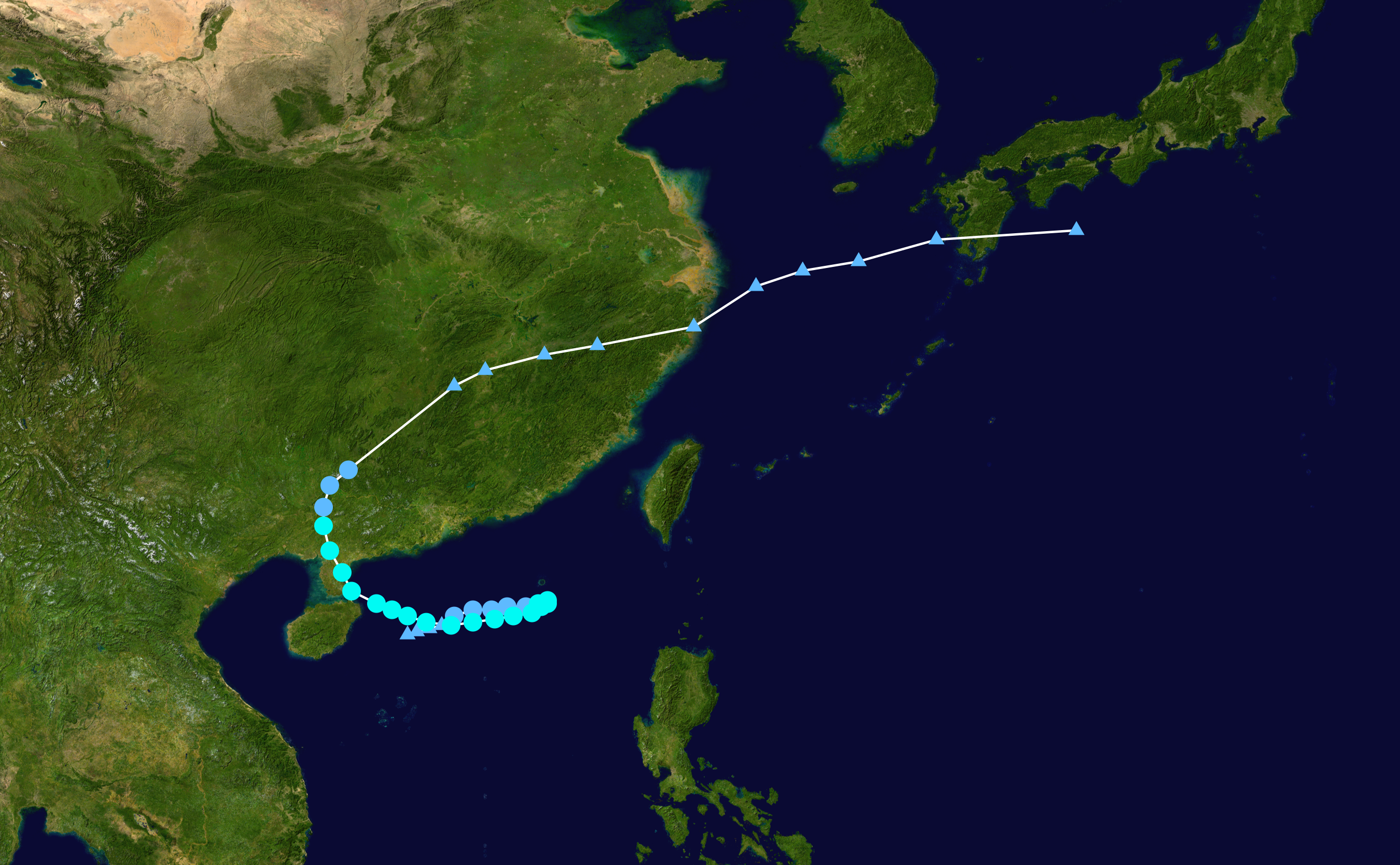
- Duration: June 3 – June 9
- Peak intensity: 95 km/h (60 mph) (10-min); 985 hPa (mbar)

Tropical Storm Russ was one of just three storms to cause the Hong Kong Observatory to raise Tropical Cyclone Signal #3 in the 1994 season. Russ was first spotted on June 2, about 140 kilometres (87 mi) east of Hainan Island as a tropical disturbance. Deep convection over the circulation center soon improved, and the Hong Kong Observatory had declared it a tropical depression on June 3 when it was located about 290 kilometres (180 mi) south of Hong Kong.

The system initially moved east to northeast while slowly strengthening. Russ became a tropical storm on the evening of June 4, passing just south of Dongsha that night. PAGASA then named the system Emang, shortly before it made a clockwise loop and started to move back towards the west-southwest, intensifying. Russ made landfall on June 8 on the northeastern Luichow Peninsula, and weakened inland. The extratropical remnants continued east-northeast toward Japan before dissipating.

The maximum wind gust in Hong Kong was reported at Tai Mo Shan, where a gust to 56 knots (104 km/h) was recorded on June 7. Maximum daily rainfall in the territory was recorded at Yuen Long on June 8, when 41.0 millimetres (1.61 in) was reported. Russ killed at least 74 people in Hainan, Guangdong and Guangxi Provinces and injured another 726 people. 16 others were reported missing. 702,430 hectares (7,024.3 square kilometres; 2,712.1 square miles) of farmland in the three provinces were destroyed by floods from Russ. Around 725,000 houses were destroyed. Total damage was estimated at 6.3 billion RMB (1994 RMB), or $727.5 million (1994 USD).

=== Tropical Storm Sharon (Gading) ===
- Tropical storm (JMA)
- Tropical storm (SSHWS)
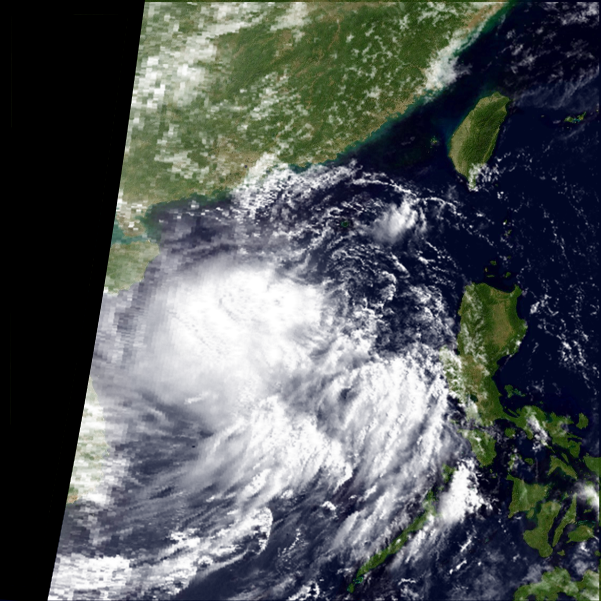
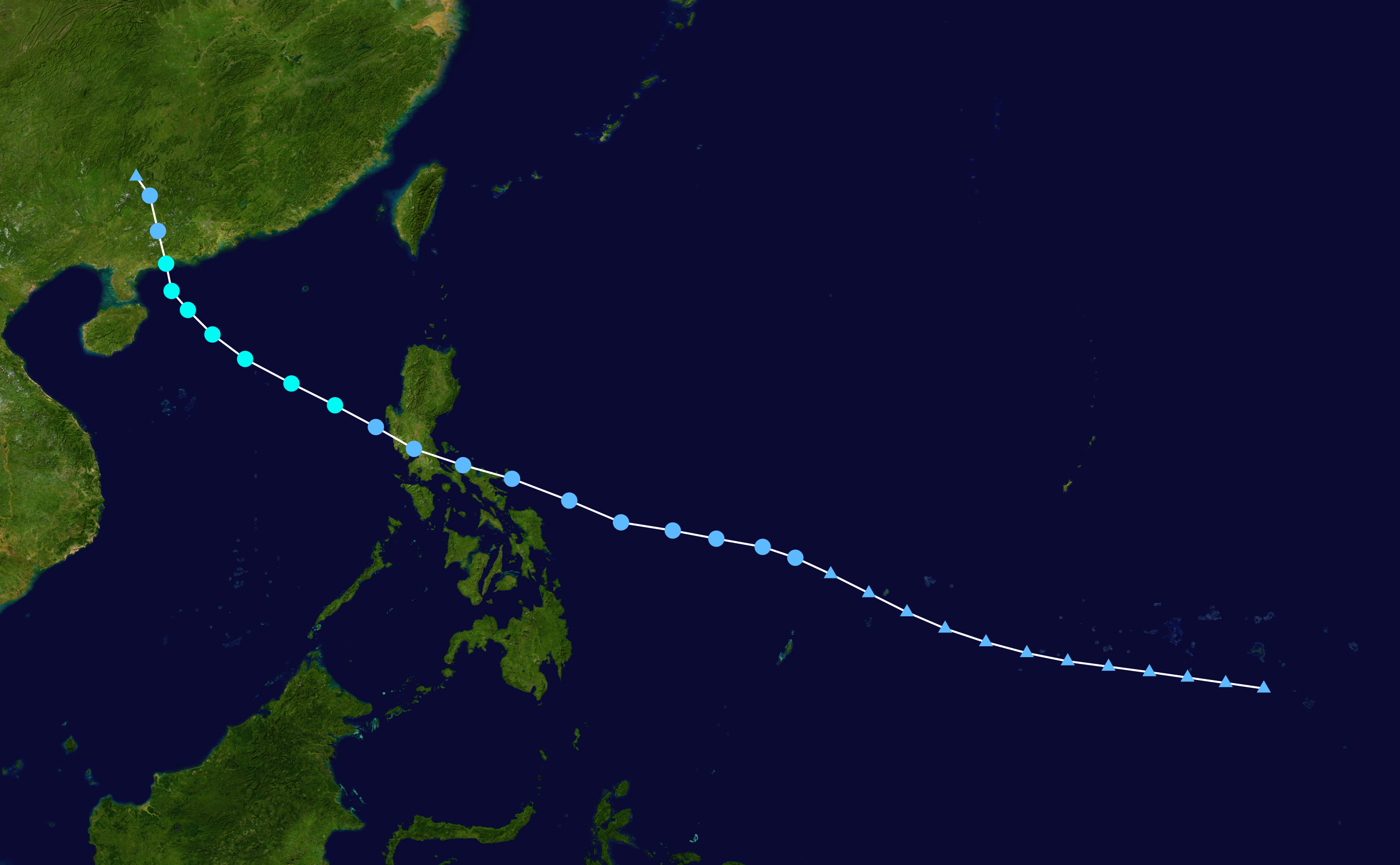
- Duration: June 21 – June 25
- Peak intensity: 75 km/h (45 mph) (10-min); 996 hPa (mbar)

In mid-June, not long after Tropical Storm Russ had made landfall, an area of convection south of Chuuk within the near-equatorial trough began to consolidate. The system moved west-northwest as it began to organize on June 20. Acquiring tropical depression strength on June 21, intensification halted due to vertical wind shear. Subsequent weakened led to its dissipation as a tropical depression by June 22.

PAGASA named the system Gading as it neared the Philippines, and twelve hours after the final warning was issued, convection once again built up, and a new warning was issued. The Japan Meteorological Agency issued their first warning on Tropical Storm 9404 a day later. As it crossed Luzon, Sharon caused flooding and released mudflows from Mount Pinatubo, killing two people. Traffic on two main highways near Manila was disrupted by the mud.

After crossing Luzon, Sharon reached its peak, with vertical shear inhibiting further intensification. It made landfall on June 25 around 140 metres (0.087 mi) east-northeast of Zhanjiang, or 110 kilometres (68 mi) east of where Tropical Storm Russ had made landfall just weeks before. Winds gusted to 52 knots (96 km/h) at Tai Mo Shan in Hong Kong. Sharon claimed 11 lives in the seas off Hong Kong, and the combined flooding effects of Russ and Sharon reportedly left more than 1,400 people dead, and caused over $6 billion (1994 USD) in damage.

=== Tropical Depression 07W ===
- Tropical depression (JMA)
- Tropical depression (SSHWS)
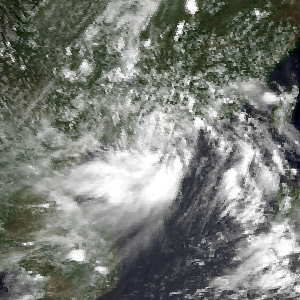
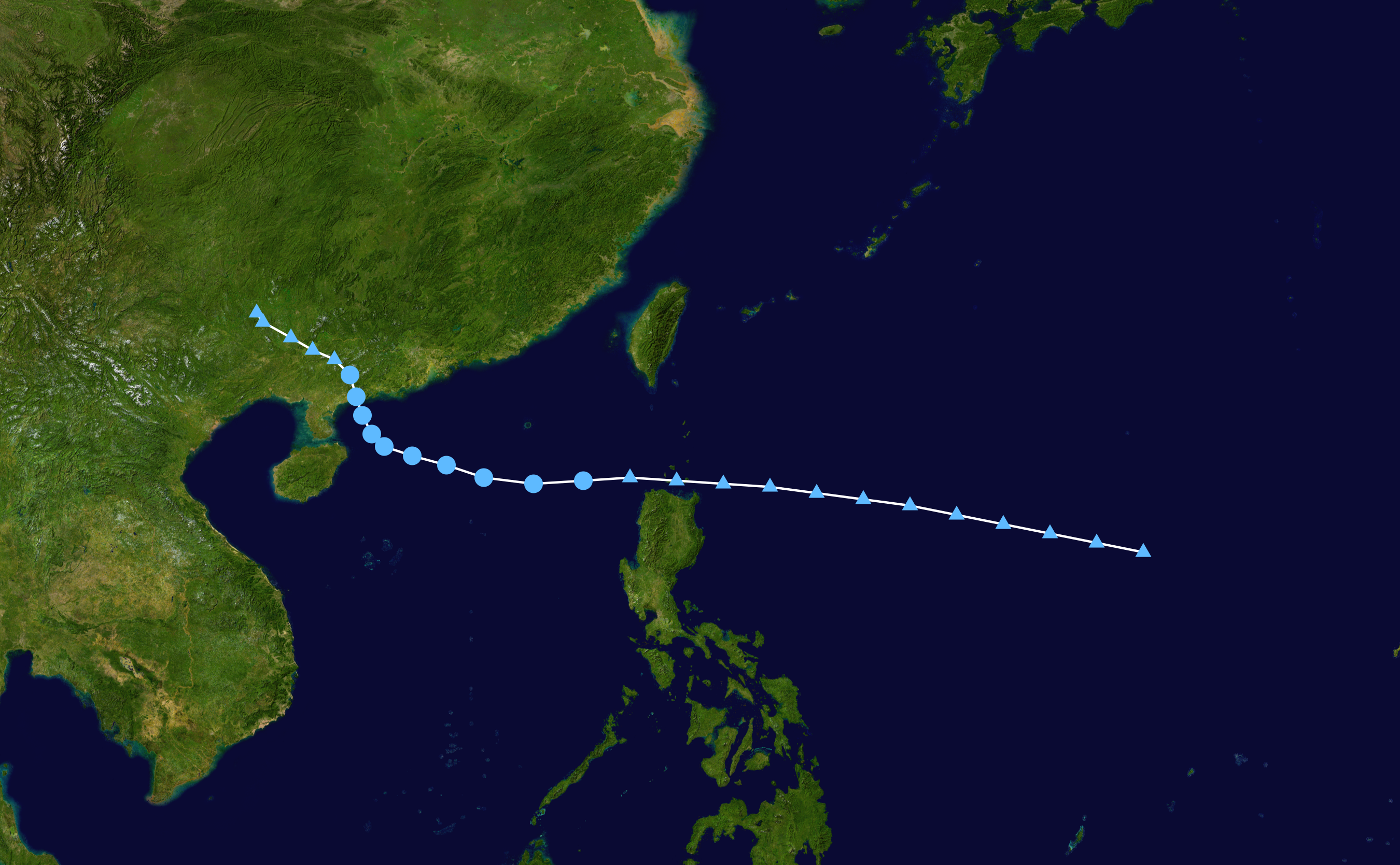
- Duration: July 3 – July 5
- Peak intensity: 55 km/h (35 mph) (10-min); 998 hPa (mbar)

Tropical Depression 07W developed in the monsoon trough on June 29, well east of the Philippines. Warnings were initiated at 0000 UTC June 3 when the system was approximately 250 km (160 mi) southeast of Dongsha. It reached its maximum intensity shortly before landfall on July 4. Flooding associated with Tropical Depression 07W in western Guangdong Province killed four people and left two others missing, and destroyed over 6,700 houses while leaving another 50,000 damaged. 120,000 hectares (1,200 square kilometres; 460 square miles) of farmland were ruined, and irrigation facilities were damaged. Total losses from the storm in Guangdong were estimated to be $114 million (1994 USD). In Guangxi Province, the storm killed six others, and left over 30,000 people homeless.

=== Typhoon Tim (Iliang) ===
- Very strong typhoon (JMA)
- Category 4 typhoon (SSHWS)
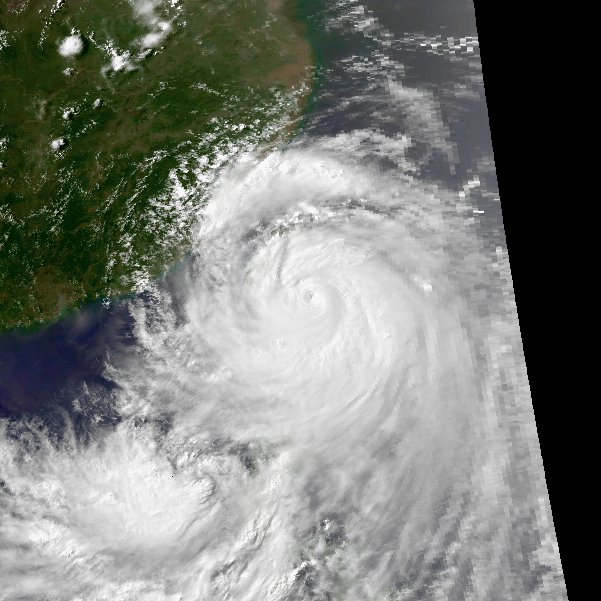
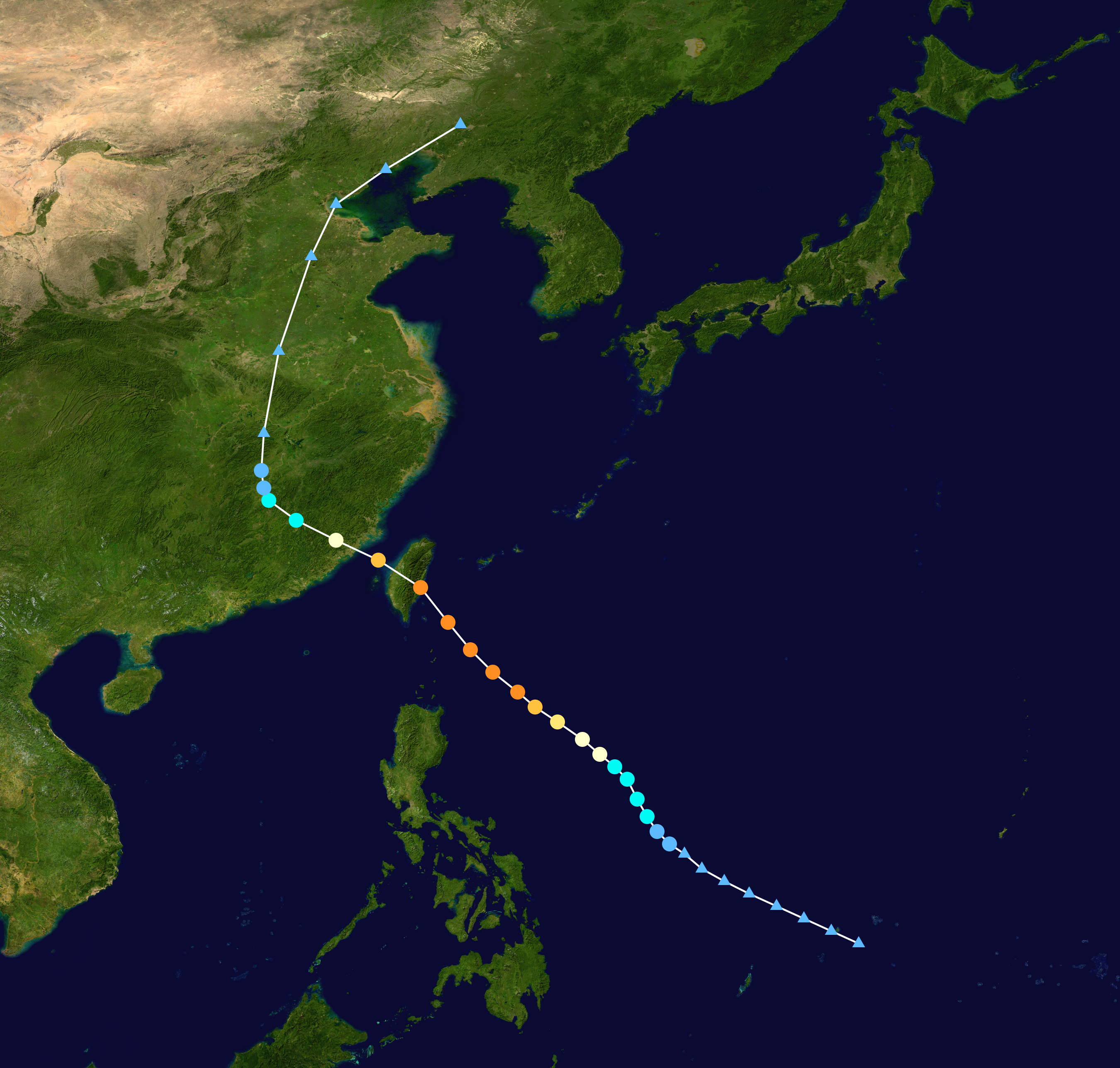
- Duration: July 7 – July 12
- Peak intensity: 175 km/h (110 mph) (10-min); 930 hPa (mbar)

A tropical disturbance formed in the Caroline Islands on July 5 south of a tropical upper tropospheric trough. The system organized into a tropical depression on the morning on July 6. Moving northwest, the depression strengthened into a tropical storm as it approached 130°E on the morning of July 8. Rapid intensification ensued, with Tim reaching typhoon intensity late on July 8, peaking at 125 knots (232 km/h) on July 10.

From July 9 to July 11, Tim and Tropical Storm Vanessa engaged in a Fujiwara interaction, and Tim absorbed the smaller Vanessa into its southeastern quadrant. Late on July 10, Tim struck Taiwan, bringing gusts of 98 knots (181 km/h) to Chenggong as it made landfall about 200 kilometres (120 mi) south of Taipei. Continuing northwest, Tim moved into mainland China as a weaker typhoon, crossing the coast about 150 kilometres (93 mi) south-southwest of Fuzhou. It dissipated well inland on July 11.

Damage was widespread in Taiwan, where Tim killed at least 19 people and left another 11 missing, and where 67 people reported injuries. A freighter with 97 mainland Chinese on board ran aground near Suao. About 50,000 hectares (500 square kilometres; 190 square miles) of farmland was flooded, and more than 300 buildings collapsed during the storm. The bad weather also disrupted international flights, and knocked out electricity to over 2 million households. NT$2 billion (1994 TWD), or US$75 million (1994 dollars), was the reported cost of damage.

In Fujian Province, Typhoon Tim killed three people and flooded 140,000 hectares (1,400 square kilometres; 540 square miles) of farmland, with damages estimated at 1.5 billion renminbi (1994 RMB), or $173.5 million (1994 USD). Tim was also responsible for 14 deaths and 6 injuries in the Philippines (Pangasinan, Ilocos Sur and Ilocos Norte provinces) as it passed near the area.

=== Tropical Storm Vanessa (Loleng) ===
- Tropical storm (JMA)
- Tropical storm (SSHWS)
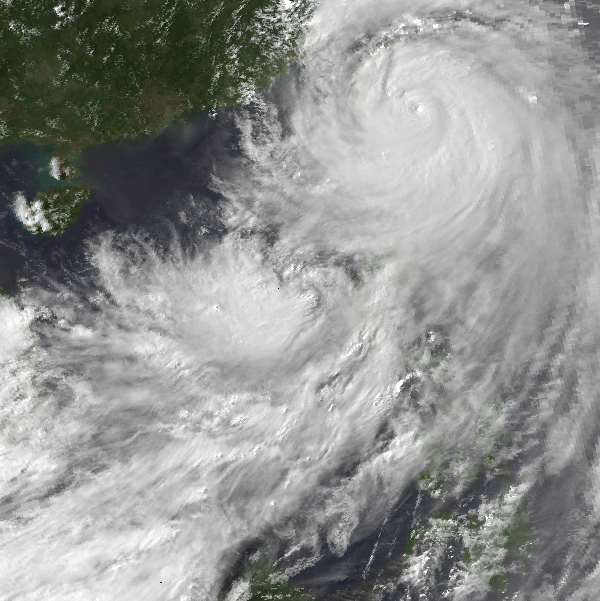
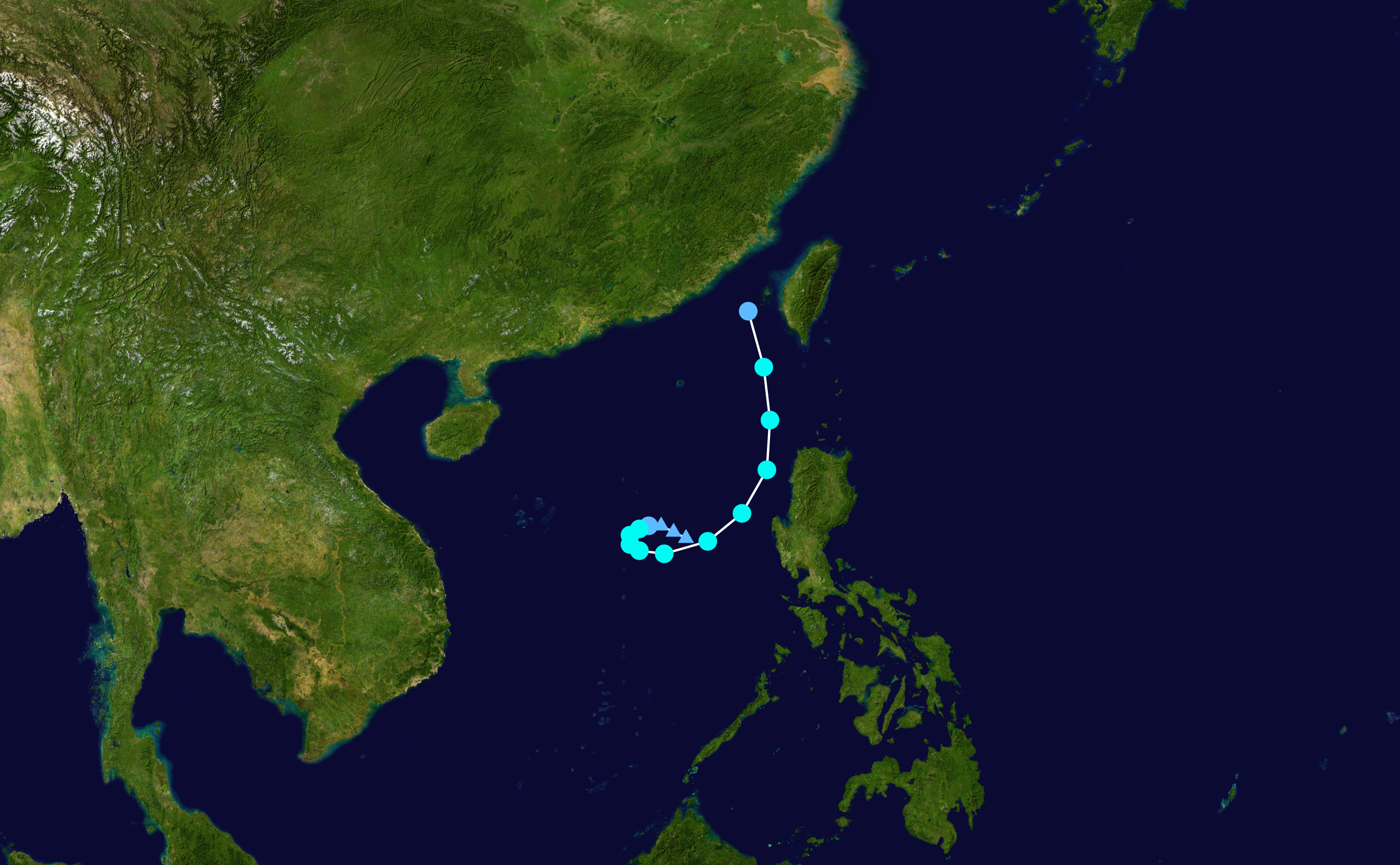
- Duration: July 9 – July 11
- Peak intensity: 75 km/h (45 mph) (10-min); 990 hPa (mbar)

As Tim developed in the Philippine Sea, a tropical disturbance in the South China Sea began to show development. Becoming a tropical depression late on July 8, it strengthened into a tropical storm early on July 9, with both the Joint Typhoon Warning Center and the Japan Meteorological Agency classifying it a tropical storm.

Vanessa made an anti-clockwise loop and then started to move northeastward under the steering influence of a monsoon flow and Typhoon Tim's circulation, reaching a peak intensity of 45 knots (83 km/h) west of Luzon before it was absorbed by the larger typhoon. The final warning was issued on July 11 after it was determined that Vanessa's circulation had been absorbed. Vanessa was responsible for three deaths in the Philippines, where it was known as Loleng.

=== Typhoon Walt (Miding) ===
- Very strong typhoon (JMA)
- Category 4 super typhoon (SSHWS)
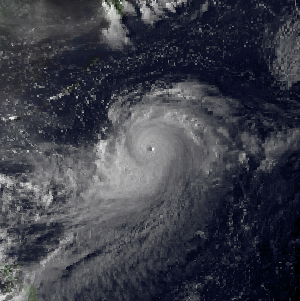
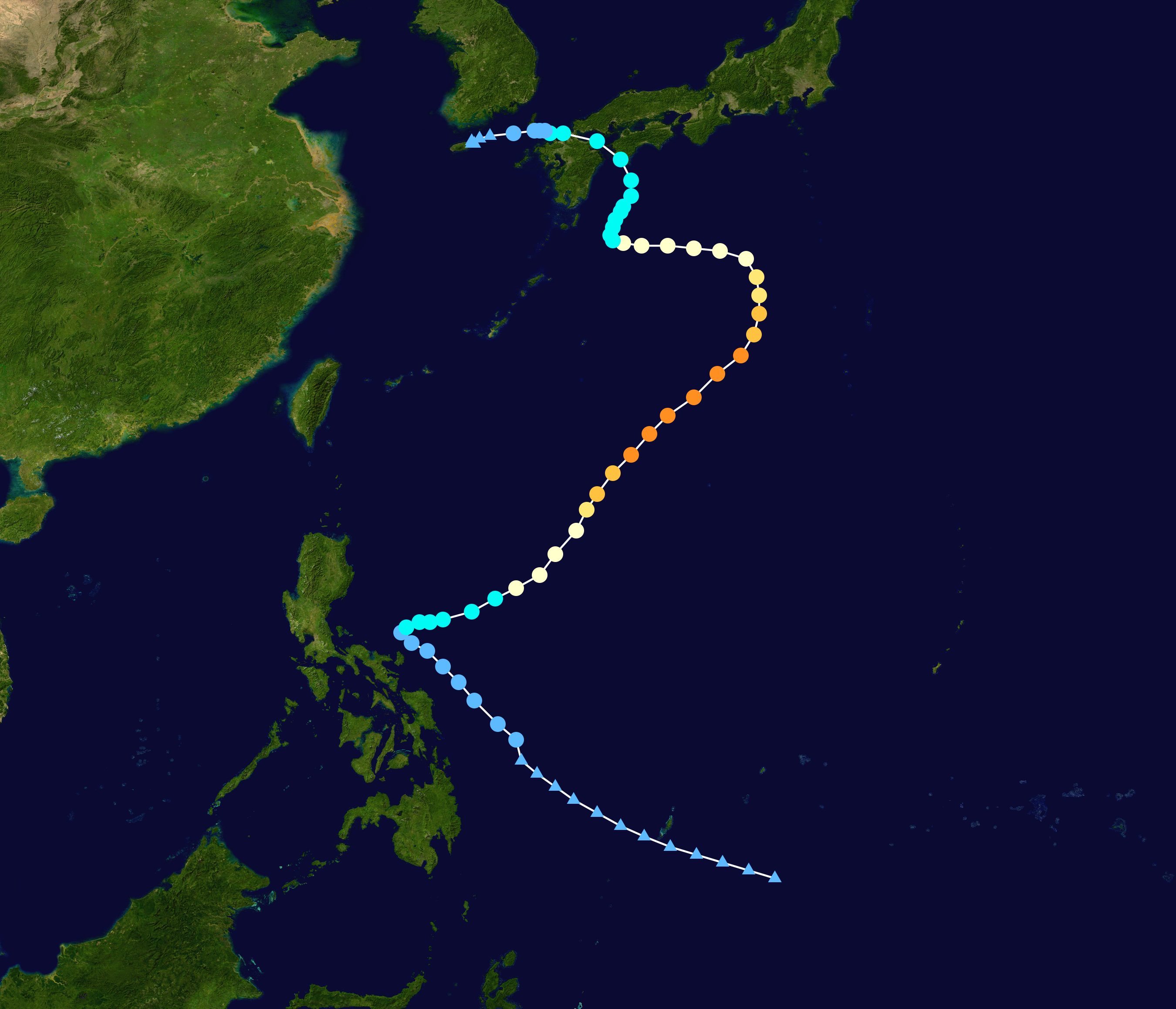
- Duration: July 14 – July 28
- Peak intensity: 185 km/h (115 mph) (10-min); 915 hPa (mbar)

Walt was part of a three tropical cyclone outbreak along a reverse-oriented monsoon trough (aligned northeast–southwest rather than the usual northwest–southeast orientation.) By July 11, a thunderstorm cluster developed near Palau. The disturbance moved slowly northwest, becoming a tropical depression late on July 14. As it neared the 15th parallel, Walt turned to the northeast and intensified. By the afternoon of July 19 the cyclone had become a super typhoon, the first of the season, an intensity it maintained for a day. While slowly weakening, Walt turned to the west. By the morning of July 23 the cyclone had dropped down to tropical storm strength as it turned to the north for a couple days. The storm turned back to the west, making landfall on the southwest end of Shikoku as a moderate tropical storm, bringing wind gusts to tropical storm force. The cyclone dissipated south of Korea by early on July 27. Rainfall across South Korea helped improve severe drought conditions.

=== Tropical Storm Yunya (Norming) ===
- Tropical storm (JMA)
- Tropical storm (SSHWS)
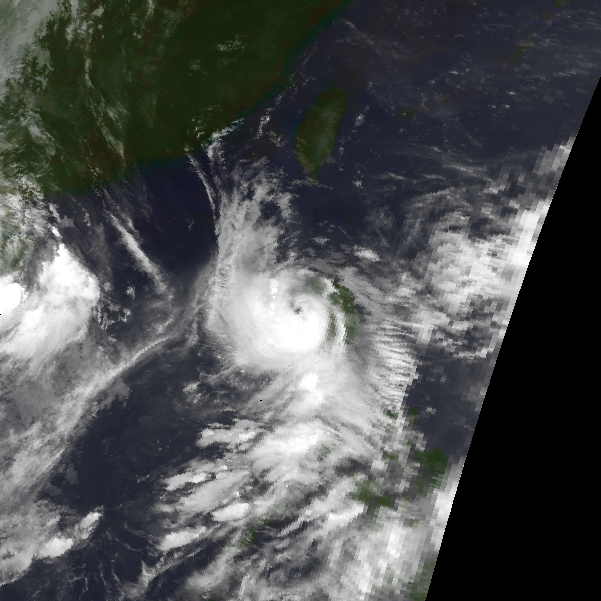
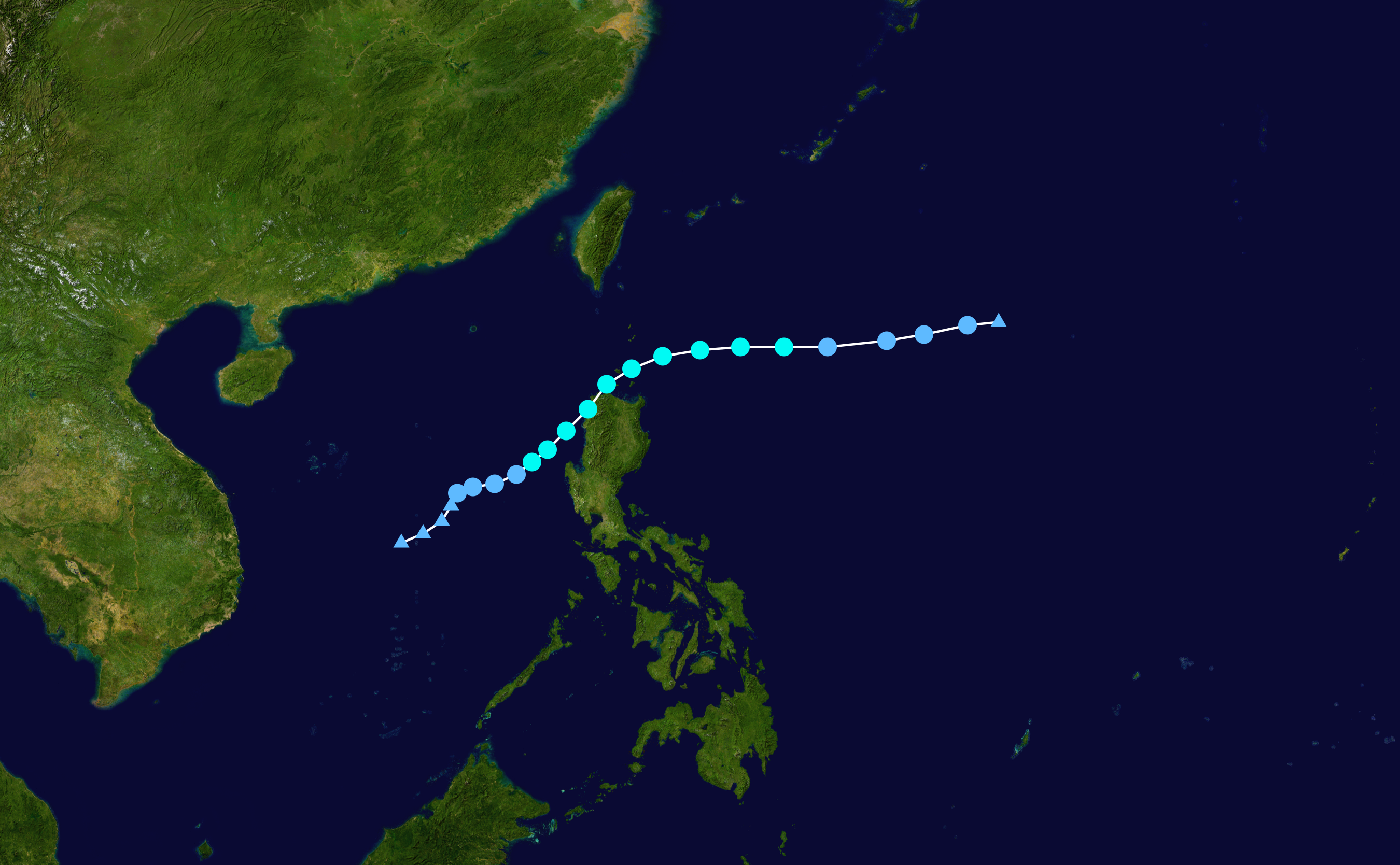
- Duration: July 17 – July 21
- Peak intensity: 85 km/h (50 mph) (10-min); 990 hPa (mbar)

The disturbance that was to become Tropical Storm Yunya was first mentioned on July 16 by the Joint Typhoon Warning Center when it was located in the South China Sea as cloudiness in a reverse-oriented monsoon trough. A weak low-level circulation was identified through animated satellite imagery and synoptic data early that morning. Moving east-northeast, the system strengthened into Tropical Depression 11W by July 18. At 0600 UTC that day, the Japan Meteorological Agency declared the formation of Tropical Storm Yunya. Yunya continued to undergo gradual strengthening, reaching its peak strength near landfall in northwest Luzon on the morning of July 19.

As it tracked over land, it became disorganized and weakened to a minimal tropical storm. In the Philippine Sea, Yunya briefly restrengthened and reached a secondary peak of 40 knots (74 km/h). The JMA discontinued warnings after it deemed Yunya to have dropped below tropical storm intensity at 1800 UTC that day, while the JTWC continued monitoring the tropical depression until convection decreased and the storm dissipated on July 21. During its life, Yunya had an unusual eastward motion, which was due to the reverse-oriented monsoon trough. Yunya was also a small system, and appeared to have been undergoing a period of rapid organisation of convection shortly before it made landfall.

Heavy rain from Yunya caused landslides of volcanic debris from Mount Pinatubo. Coincidentally, a previous Typhoon Yunya in 1991 hit the Philippines the day of Mount Pinatubo's major eruption. Gusts were in excess of 60 knots (110 km/h) across Luzon. Yunya killed at least 11 people and injured at least 7 others, and affected over 420,000 people. A total of $37.6 million (1994 USD) in damage was reported in the Philippines from Yunya.

=== Typhoon Zeke ===
- Severe tropical storm (JMA)
- Category 1 typhoon (SSHWS)
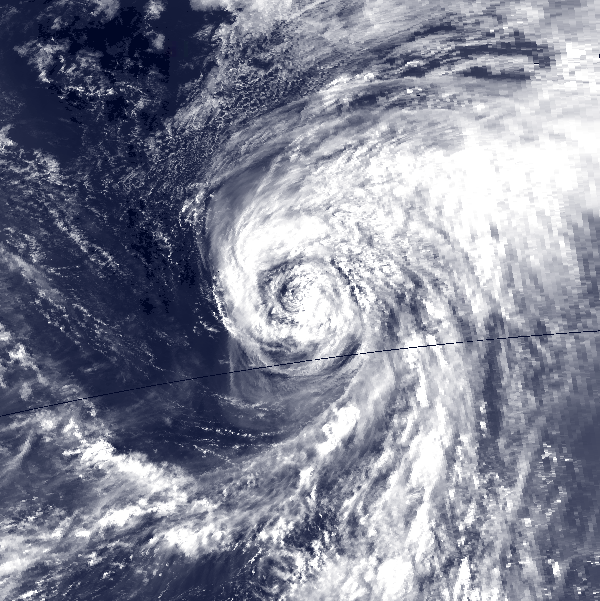
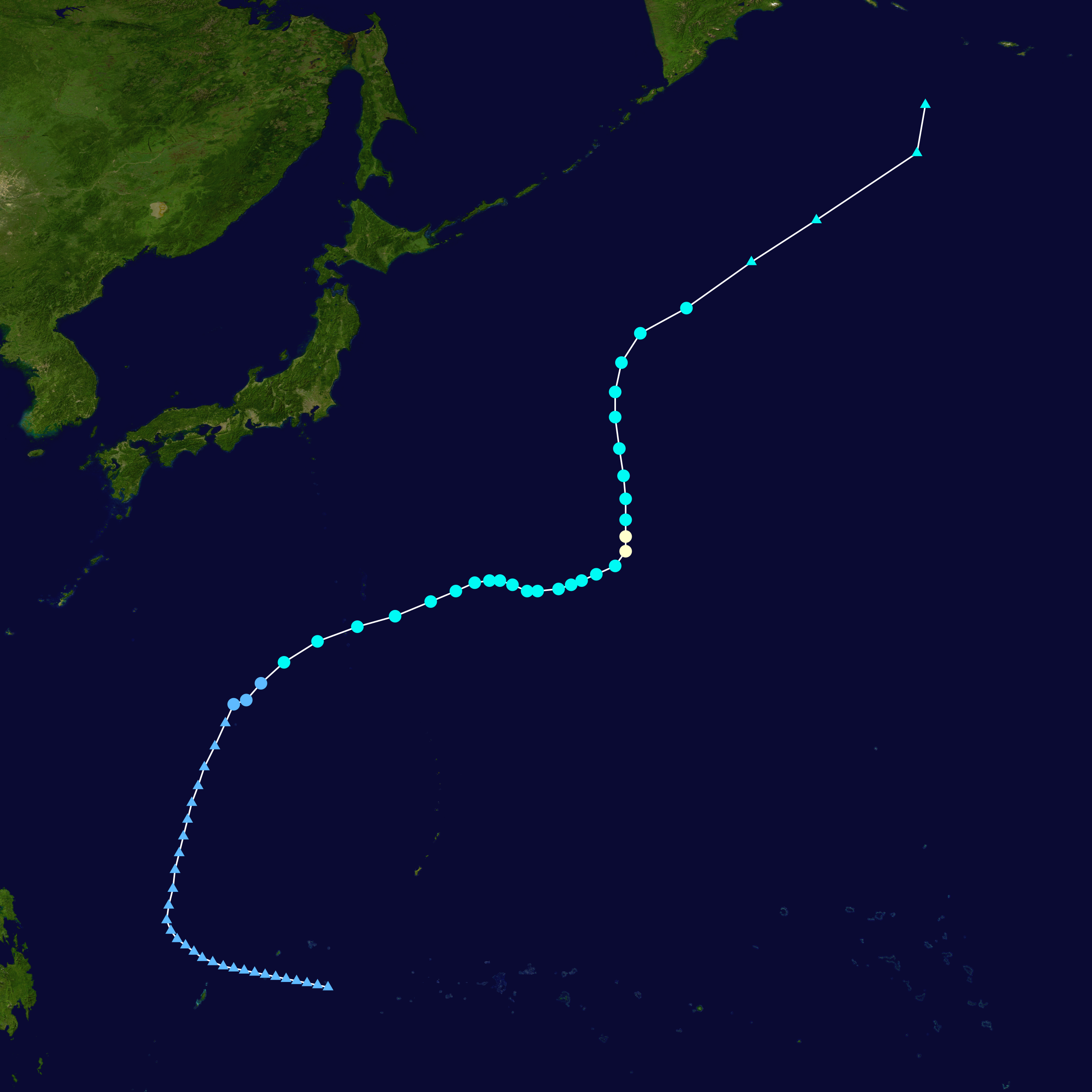
- Duration: July 17 – July 24
- Peak intensity: 95 km/h (60 mph) (10-min); 985 hPa (mbar)

Forming at the opposite end of the monsoon trough from Walt on July 14, the initial tropical disturbance moved north to northeast. Slowly developing, the system became a tropical depression during the early afternoon of July 18. Westerly upper-level shear from Walt was slowing development, and Zeke finally achieved tropical storm status early on July 20. The cyclone continued to waver around a northeast track. After turning more northward early on the afternoon of July 22, Zeke became a typhoon for half of a day. Wavering around a more northerly track, Zeke weakened and evolved into an extratropical cyclone on by early on July 25.

=== Tropical Storm Amy ===
- Tropical storm (JMA)
- Tropical storm (SSHWS)
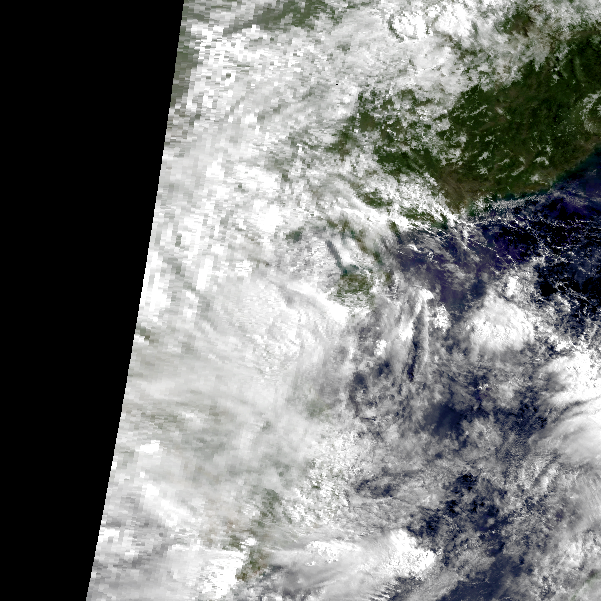
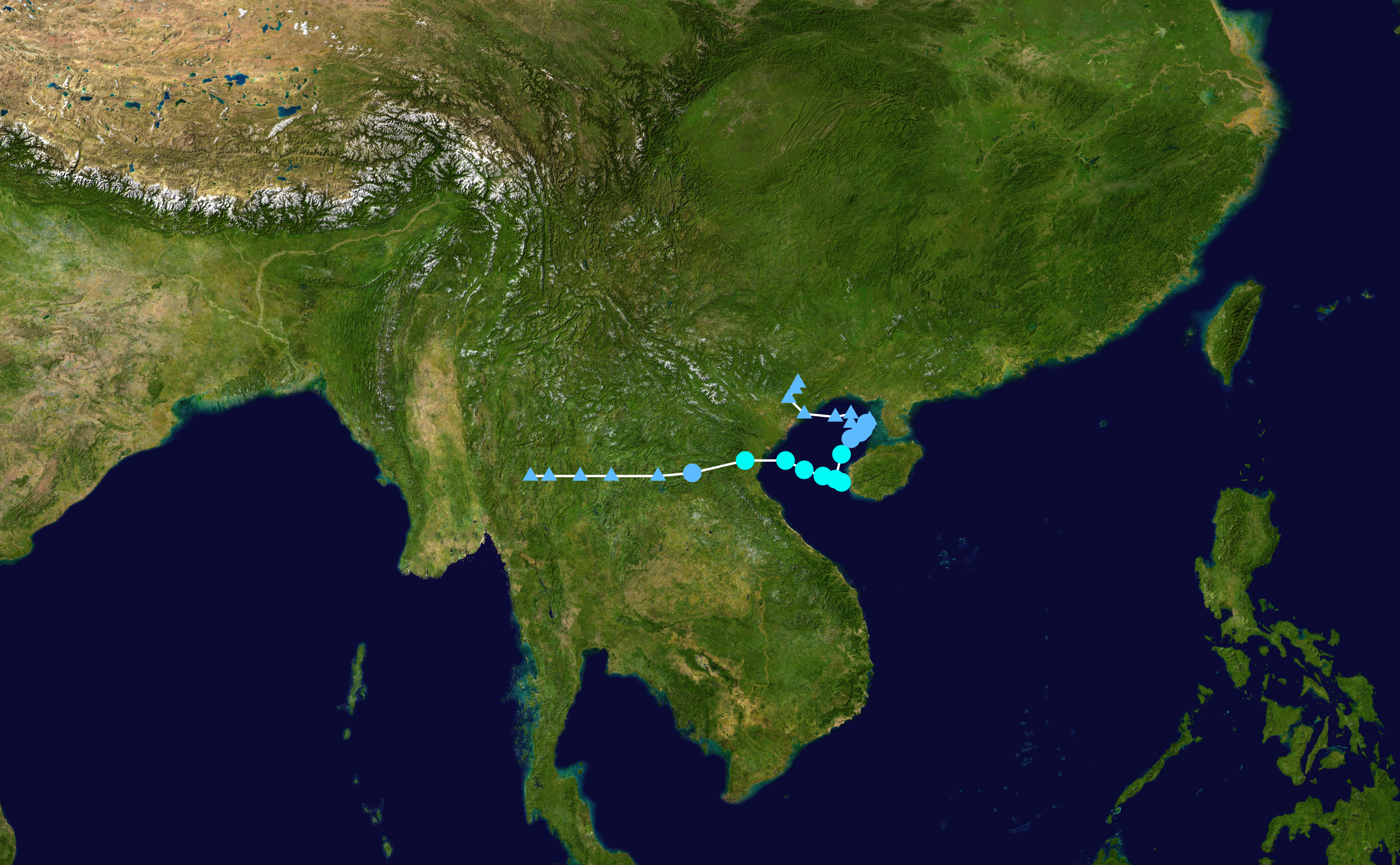
- Duration: July 25 – July 31
- Peak intensity: 85 km/h (50 mph) (10-min); 985 hPa (mbar)

An area of persistent convection associated with a low-level circulation centre moved off Hainan Island into water on July 29. The Japan Meteorological Agency then reported that Tropical Storm 9410 had formed early that day, in the Gulf of Tonkin west of Hainan. This was later designated by the Joint Typhoon Warning Center as Tropical Depression 15W, and it was quickly upgraded to a tropical storm. It moved westward and started to weaken over water, making landfall south of Hanoi before dissipating inland.

Tropical Storm Amy killed 15 and left over 32,000 people displaced in Thailand and Cambodia, and caused damage worth $8 million (1994 USD).

=== Tropical Storm Brendan (Oyang) ===
- Tropical storm (JMA)
- Tropical storm (SSHWS)
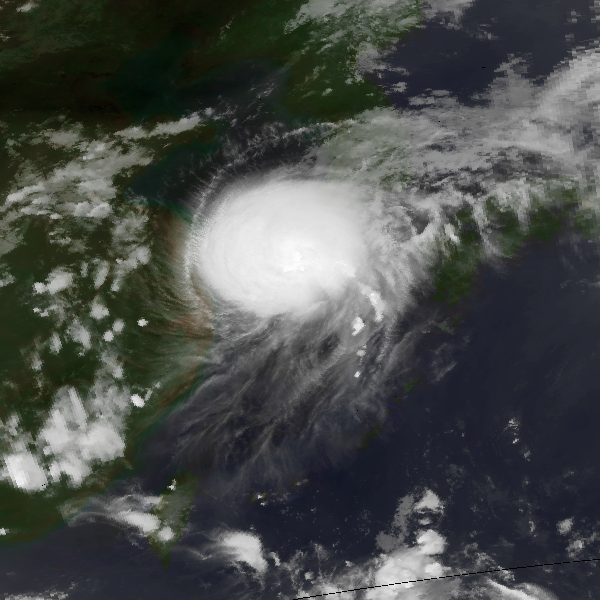
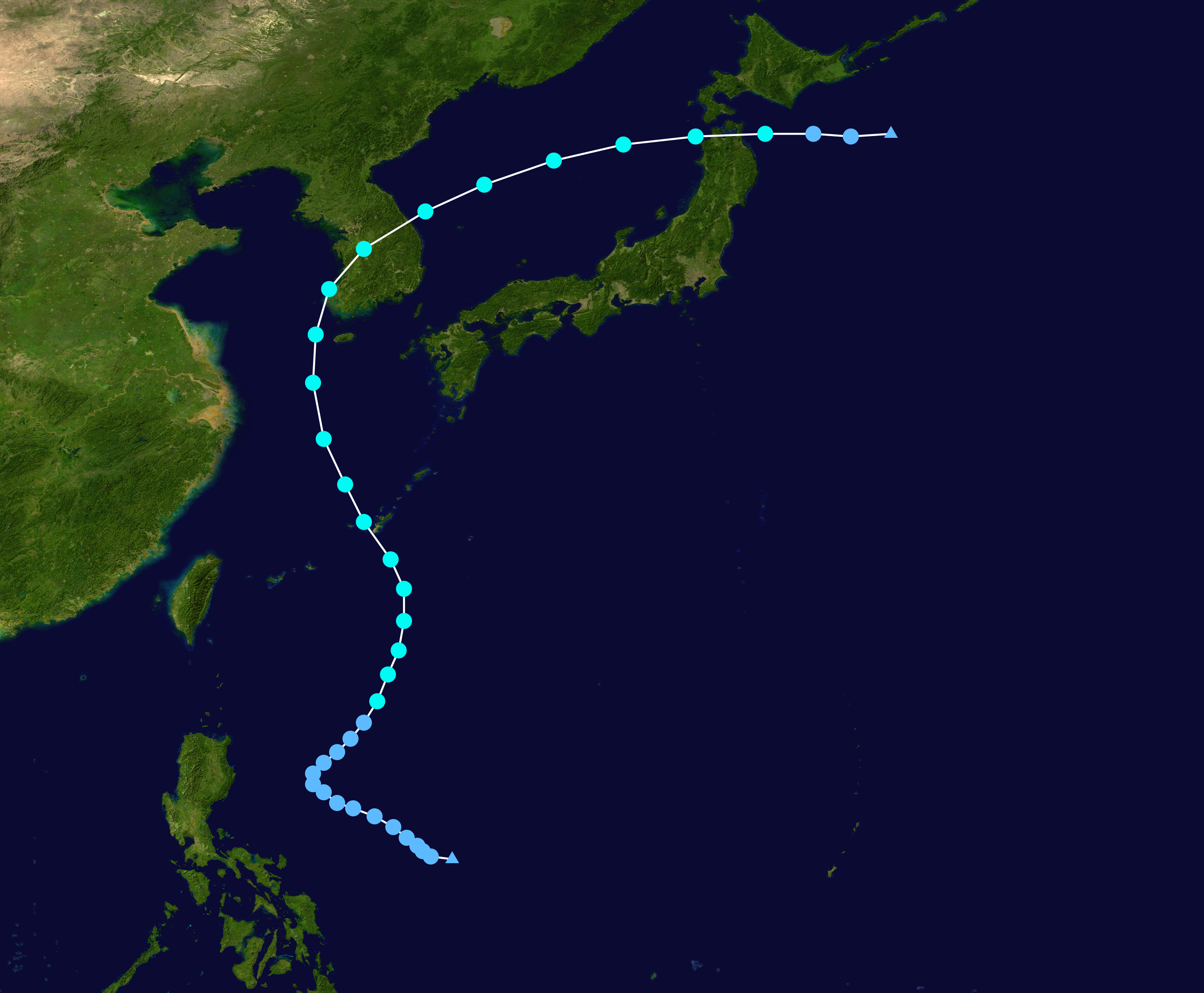
- Duration: July 25 – August 3
- Peak intensity: 85 km/h (50 mph) (10-min); 992 hPa (mbar)

On July 26 a tropical disturbance developed in the Philippine Sea. The system moved northwest at a slow pace for a couple days. A southwest surge in the monsoon turned the disturbance northward, and the system became a tropical depression on the morning of July 29. Accelerating to the north, Brendan became a tropical storm just before reaching Okinawa. The cyclone reached peak intensity to the south of Cheju Island, Korea as a moderate tropical storm. After recurving in the Yellow Sea, the storm recurved across Korea during extratropical transition with subtropical cyclone characteristics. The cyclone evolved into an extratropical cyclone while crossing the Sea of Japan, and reintensified. Up to 200 millimetres (7.9 in) of rain in the Korean peninsula helped relieve drought conditions. Two died in Korea during the passage of Brendan.

=== Tropical Storm Caitlin (Pasing) ===
- Tropical storm (JMA)
- Tropical storm (SSHWS)
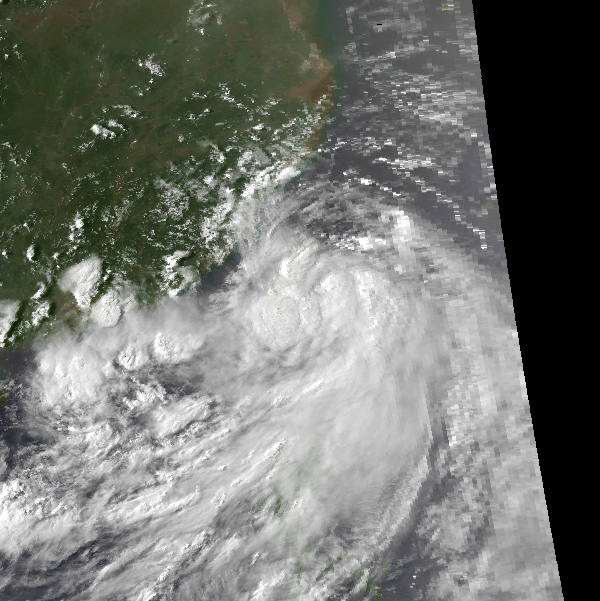
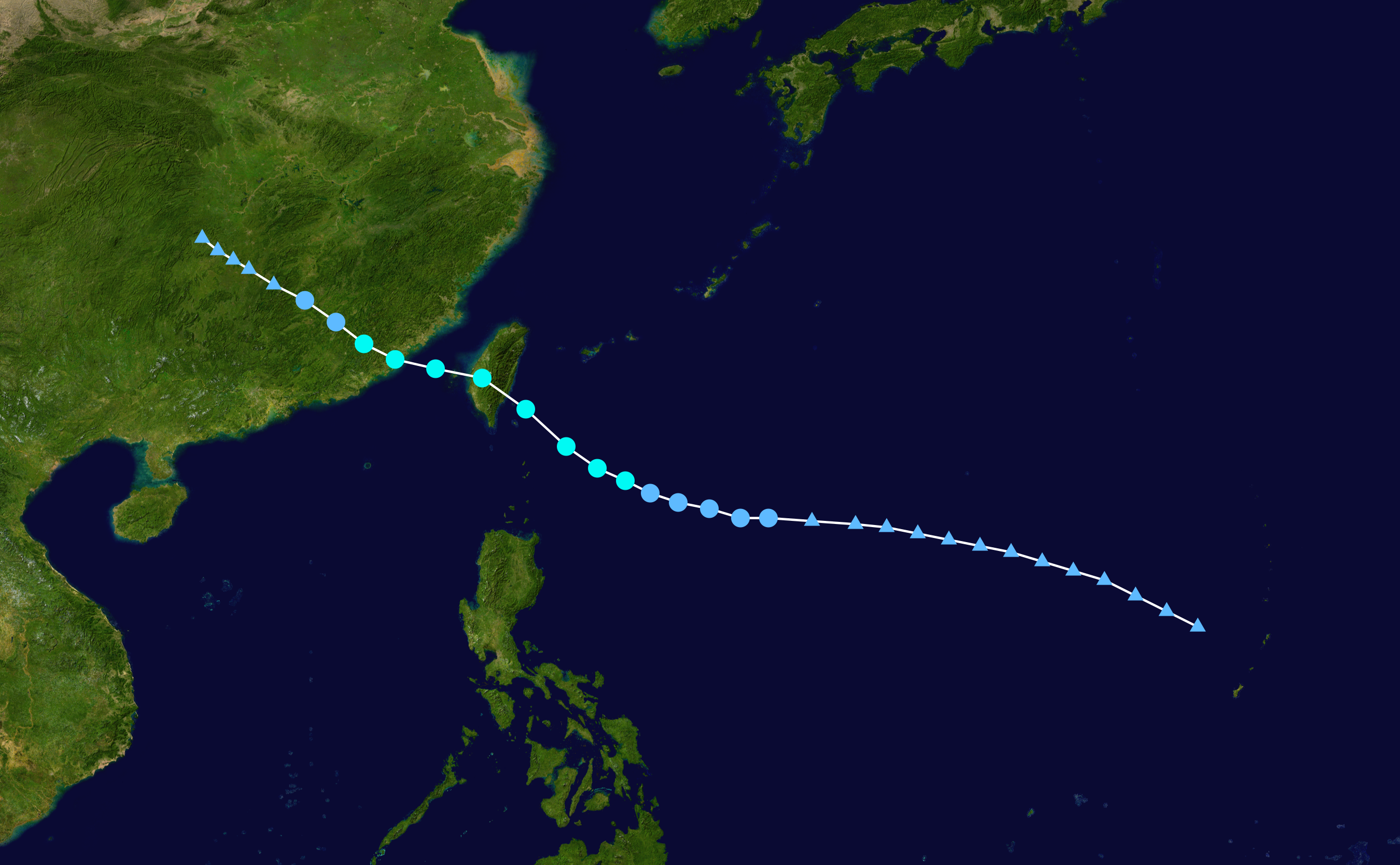
- Duration: July 28 – August 6
- Peak intensity: 85 km/h (50 mph) (10-min); 990 hPa (mbar)

A tropical disturbance formed within the monsoon trough northwest of Guam on July 29. Slow development ensued, and four days later, it had become a tropical depression. By late on August 2 the cyclone had achieved tropical storm status. The system turned northwest and accelerated towards Taiwan/Taipei. During the morning of August 3, Caitlin became a storm tropical storm as it made landfall in Hualien county. Green Island experienced gusts of typhoon force for 21 hours as the cyclone's center moved to its north. Taking six hours to cross the mountainous island, Caitlin entered the Taiwan Straits on August 4. Ten perished across Taiwan and damage there totaled NT$620 million (1994 dollars), or $23.4 million (1994 USD). By late morning, its center passed inland into mainland China. Rainfall rates as high as 84 millimetres (3.3 in) per hour were witnessed in the Ningxia Hui autonomous region. Mountain floods left eight dead.

=== Typhoon Doug (Ritang) ===
- Very strong typhoon (JMA)
- Category 5 super typhoon (SSHWS)
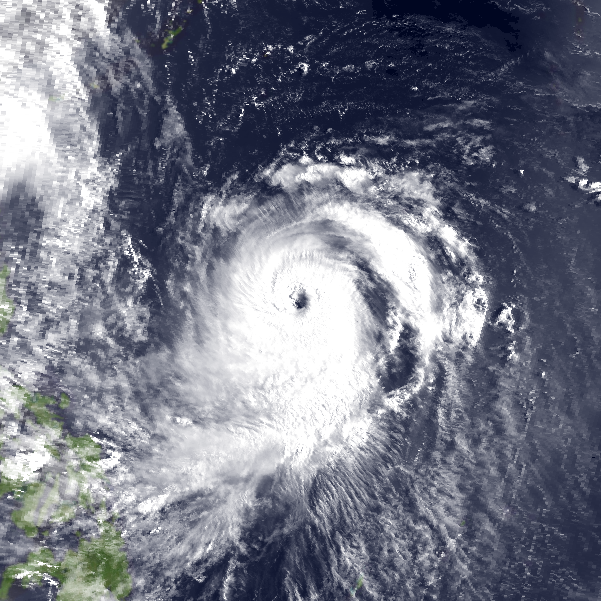
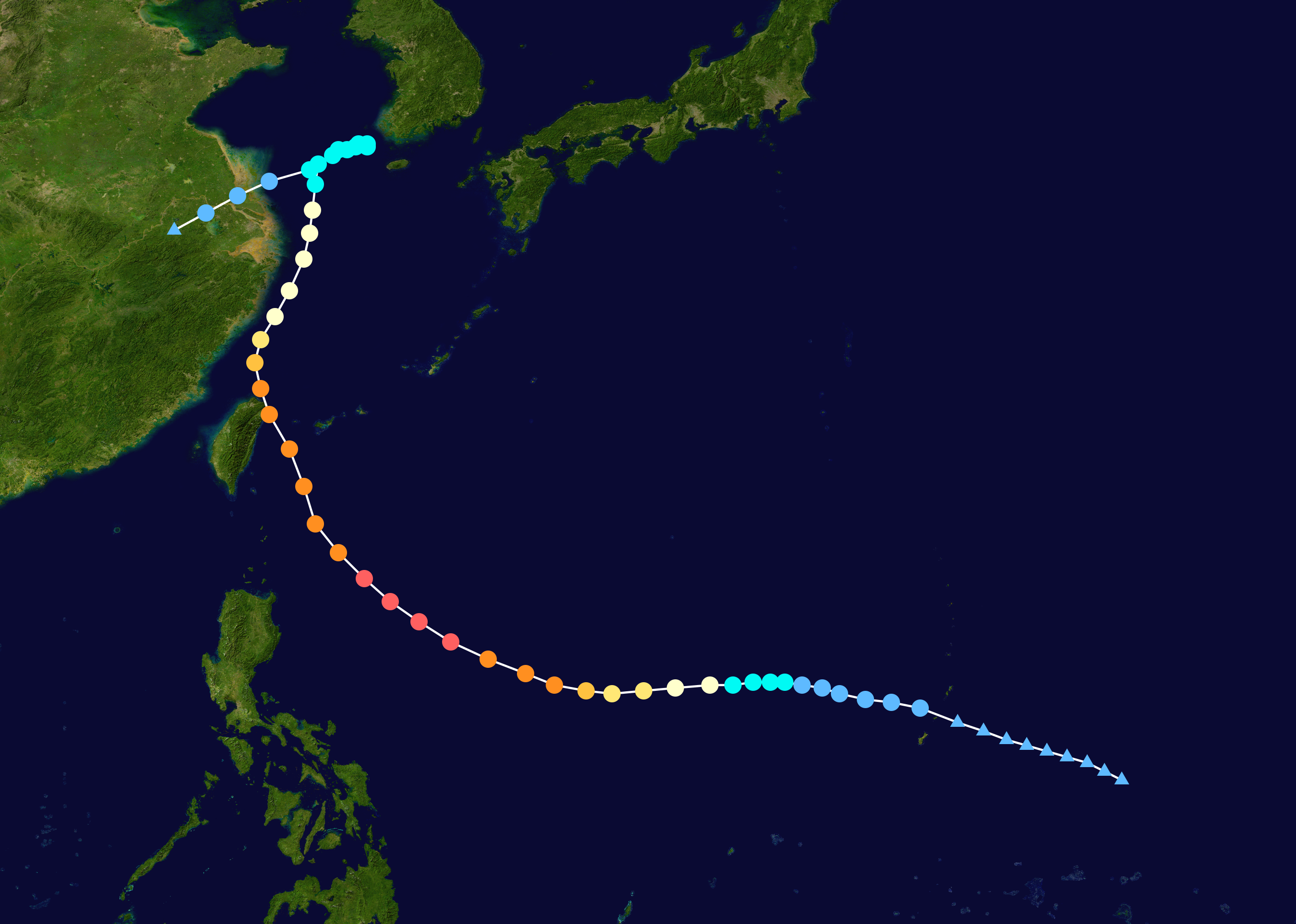
- Duration: August 1 – August 13
- Peak intensity: 185 km/h (115 mph) (10-min); 925 hPa (mbar)

The eastern end of a monsoon trough developed a tropical depression on July 30. It headed westward, slowly strengthening to a tropical storm on the 2nd and a typhoon on the 3rd. Doug turned more to the northwest, and rapidly intensified from the 4th to the 5th to a 140 kn (260 km/h) super typhoon. It weakened slightly to a 125 kn (232 km/h) typhoon before brushing the eastern coast of Taiwan on the 7th. Its circulation became ragged, and it weakened to a tropical storm on the 10th. A ridge to the north pushed Doug west-southwestward where it dissipated over China on the 13th. A total of 26 people died, and damage was estimated on Taiwan at $110 million (1994 USD).

=== Typhoon Ellie ===
- Typhoon (JMA)
- Category 1 typhoon (SSHWS)
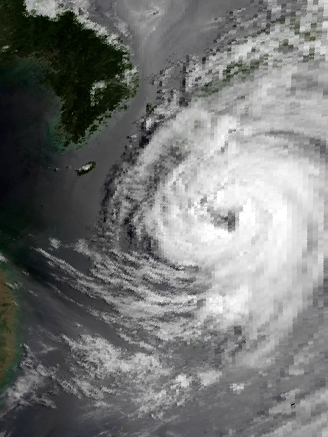
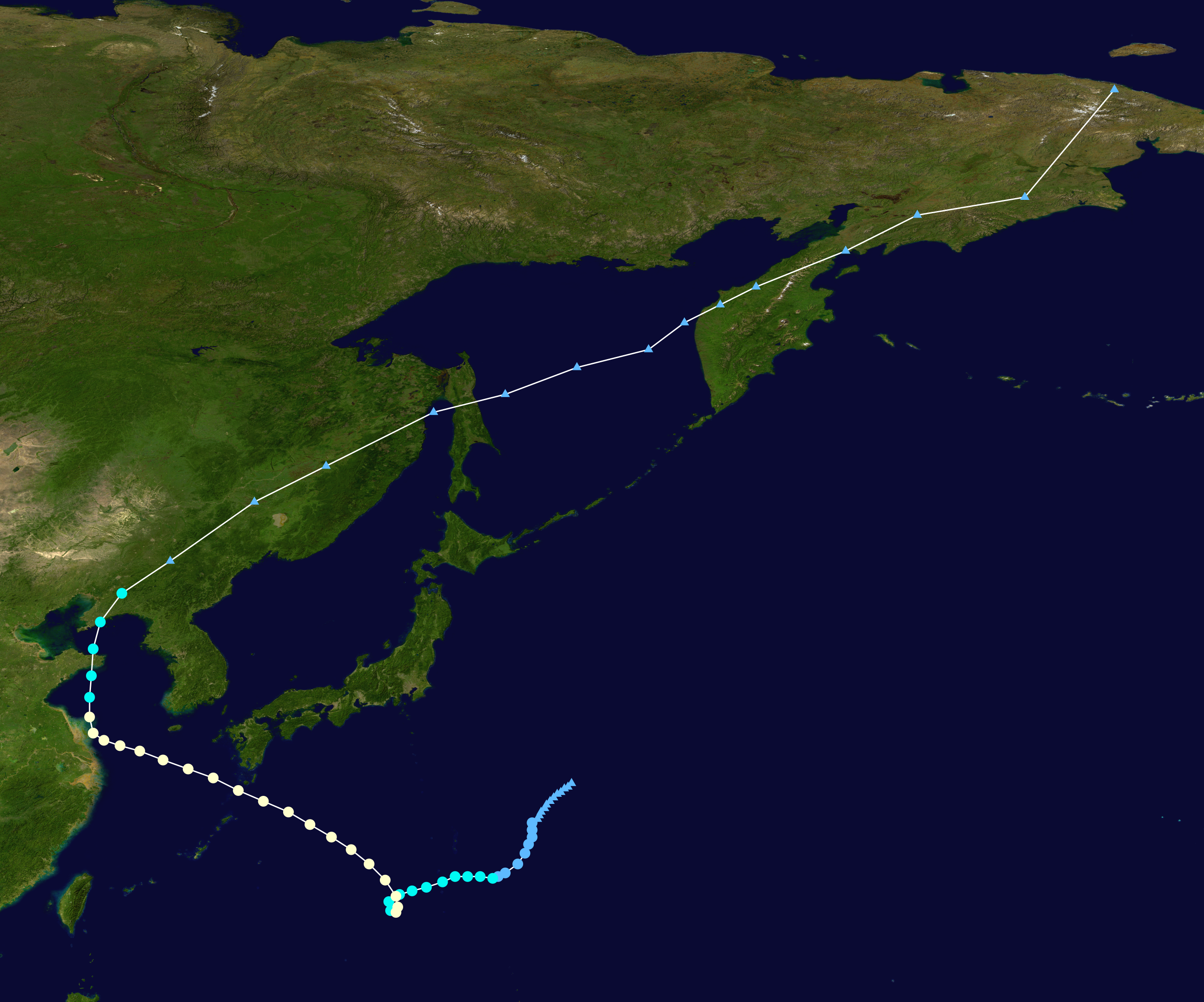
- Duration: August 6 – August 16
- Peak intensity: 150 km/h (90 mph) (10-min); 959 hPa (mbar)

A tropical disturbance formed 900 kilometres (560 mi) southeast of Japan on August 2. The system drifted southward and slowly developed, becoming Tropical Depression 18W, and then a tropical storm, on August 8. The system turned to the west-southwest, forming a large eye as it became a typhoon on August 9 before stalling. On August 10, the system moved west-northwest at a moderate pace, passing 130 kilometres (81 mi) offshore southern Kyūshū on August 13. Ellie turned northward on August 14, clipping eastern China before making a final landfall within northeast China as a tropical storm on August 16.

=== Tropical Storm Li ===
- Tropical storm (JMA)
- Tropical storm (SSHWS)
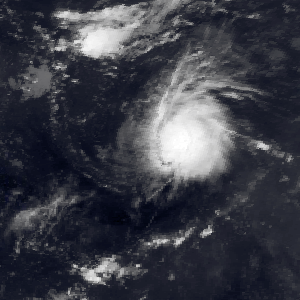
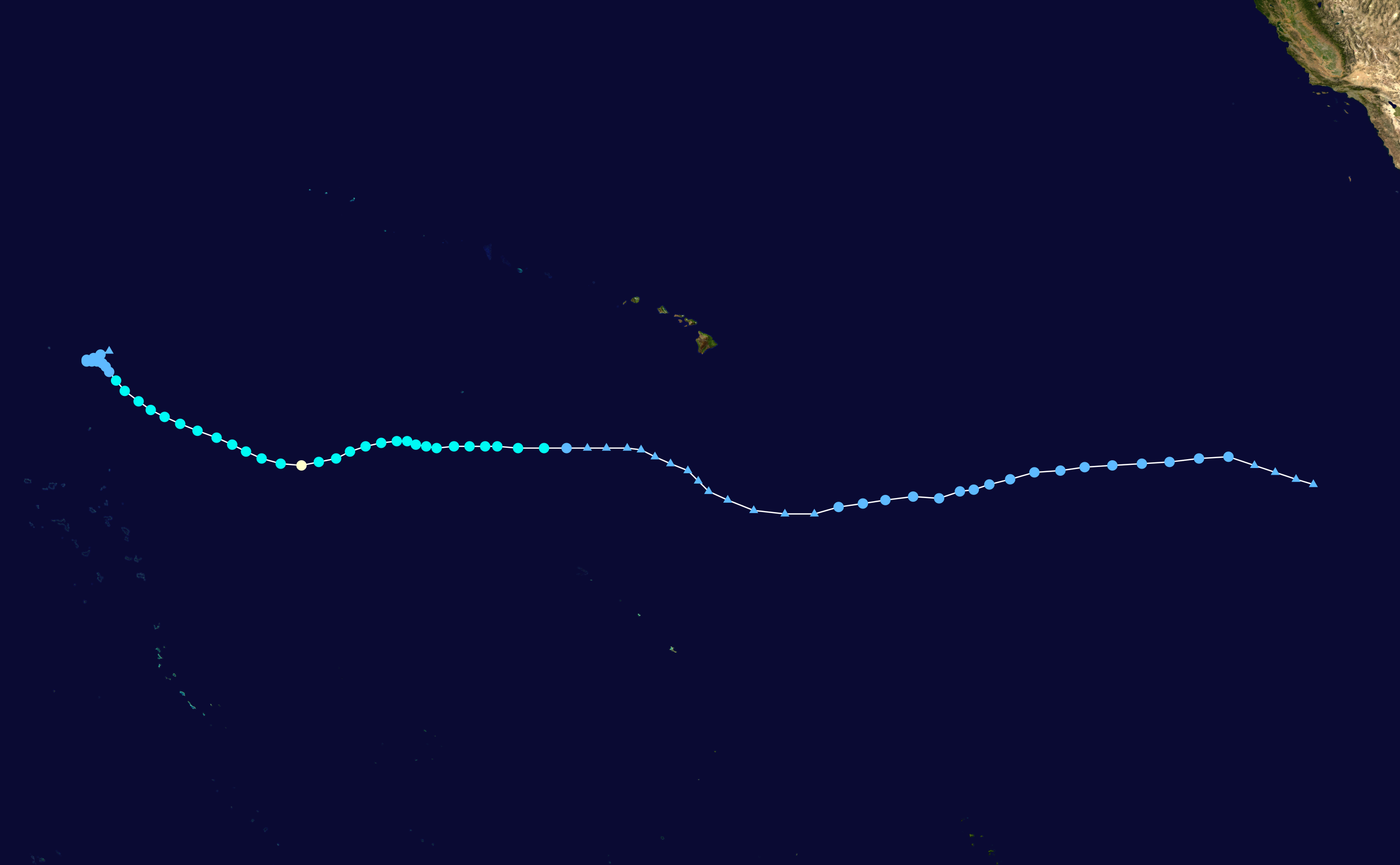
- Duration: August 12 (Entered basin) – August 17
- Peak intensity: 85 km/h (50 mph) (10-min); 992 hPa (mbar)

Late on August 12, Hurricane Li moved into the basin from the Central Pacific, with the JTWC and CPHC reporting that the system had weakened into a tropical storm as it crossed the International Date Line. Over the next few days as Li moved northwestwards towards Wake Island, it weakened steadily under the influence of strong upper-level westerly winds. During August 14, the JMA reported that the system had weakened into a tropical depression, before the JTWC followed suit during the next day as it affected Wake Island. The system was last noted as it dissipated over open water during August 18.

=== Typhoon Fred (Susang) ===
- Very strong typhoon (JMA)
- Category 4 super typhoon (SSHWS)
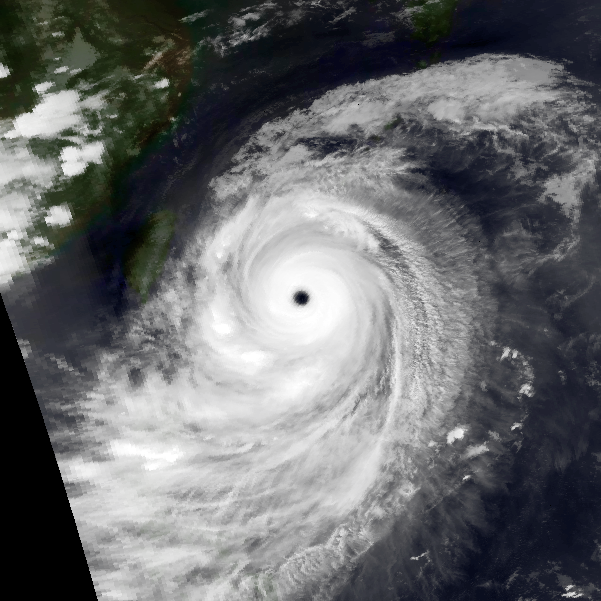
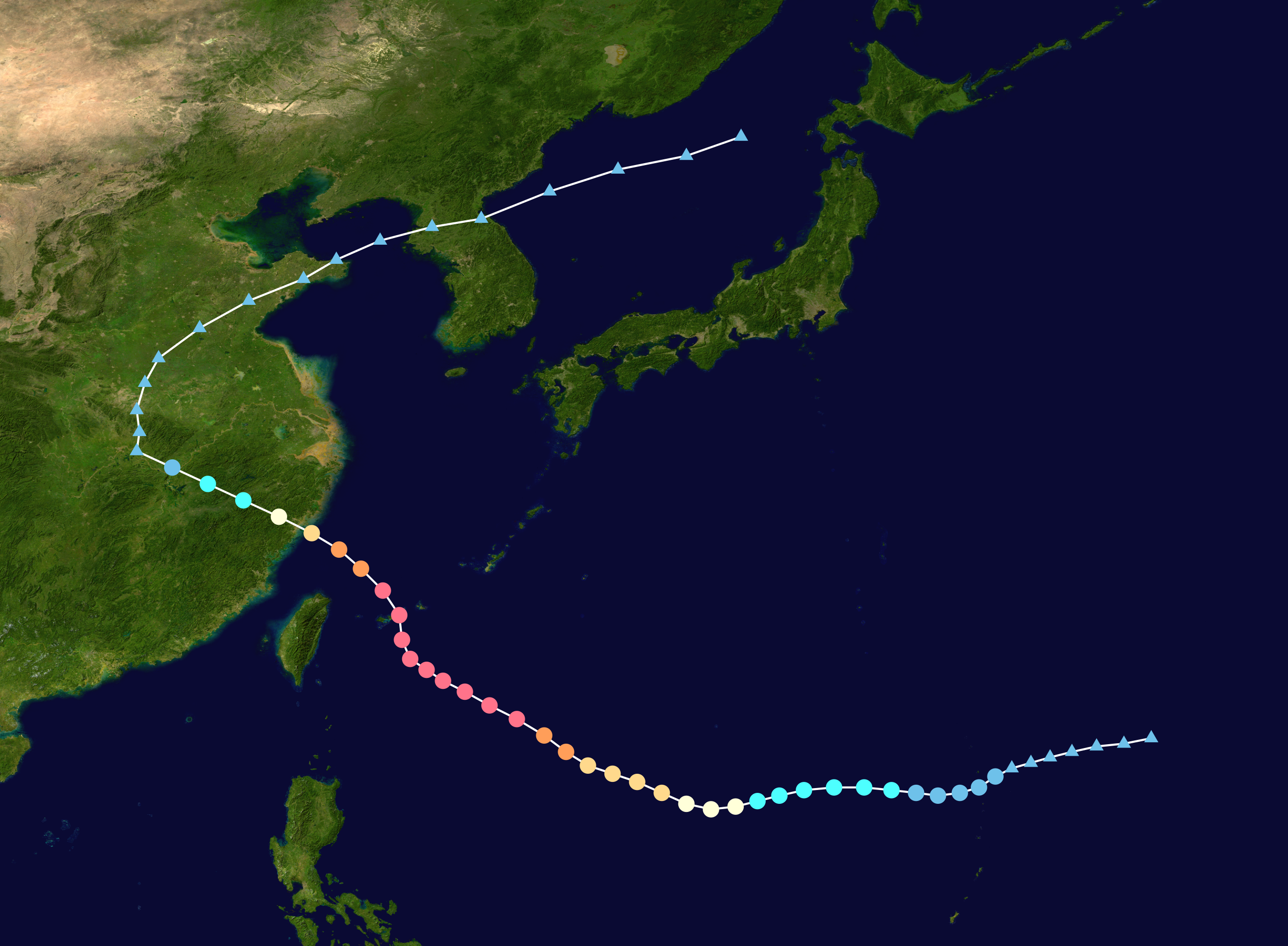
- Duration: August 14 – August 23
- Peak intensity: 185 km/h (115 mph) (10-min); 925 hPa (mbar)

On August 15, Tropical Depression 19W became a tropical storm over the open West Pacific. Fred tracked westward, slowly intensifying to a typhoon on August 16 and a peak of 130 kn (240 km/h) winds on August 19. Unlike most super typhoons, Fred did not rapidly intensify; its strengthening rate was steady. As it passed by Taiwan, heavy rainfall caused landslides across the mountainous island. Three perished and a total of NT$22 million (1994 dollars), or $835,500 (1994 USD), of damage occurred within Taiwan.

The storm weakened to an 85 kn (157 km/h) typhoon before hitting eastern China on August 21. Significant infrastructure damage occurred near the location of landfall. Unfortunately, the landfall coincided with an unusually high astronomical tide, resulting in extreme storm surge combined with heavy flooding, amounting to over 1,000 fatalities and significant damage totaling 7.5 billion RMB, or $874.4 million (1994 USD).

=== Typhoon Gladys (Uding) ===
- Typhoon (JMA)
- Category 3 typhoon (SSHWS)
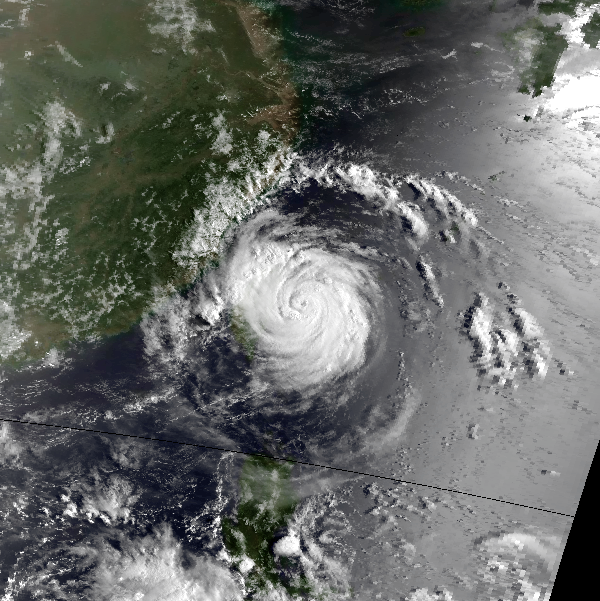
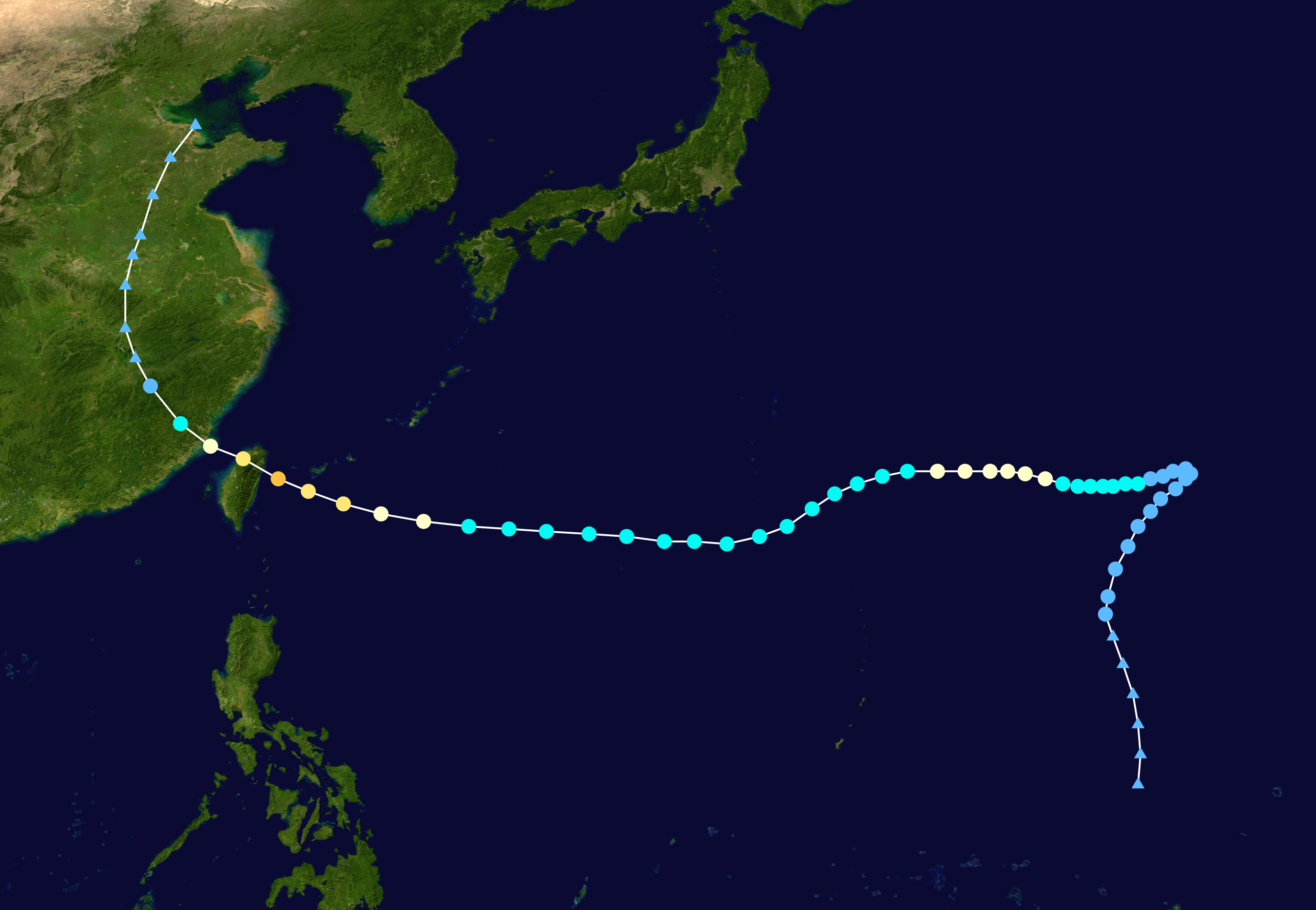
- Duration: August 20 – September 4
- Peak intensity: 150 km/h (90 mph) (10-min); 955 hPa (mbar)

On August 19, a small area of thunderstorm activity formed in the open tropical western Pacific Ocean on the eastern end of the monsoon trough. By August 22, the system organized into a small tropical cyclone, which was heading off towards the north. On August 23, the system turned westward due to increased ridging to its north. It soon became a tropical storm on August 24, and developed into a typhoon on August 25. Westerly vertical wind shear led to weakening, and Gladys became a weak tropical storm on August 28. The wind shear relented, and Gladys redeveloped into a typhoon as it moved towards Taiwan, increasing in size as well as intensity. The system weakened as it tracked across northern Taiwan, prior to making landfall over mainland China, dissipating on September 2. Winds at Suao gusted to 133 knots (246 km/h) as it moved by northern Taiwan. Six people perished. A total of NT$400 million (1994 dollars), or $15.4 million (1994 USD), in agricultural damage was incurred across Taiwan.

=== Tropical Storm Harry ===
- Tropical storm (JMA)
- Tropical storm (SSHWS)
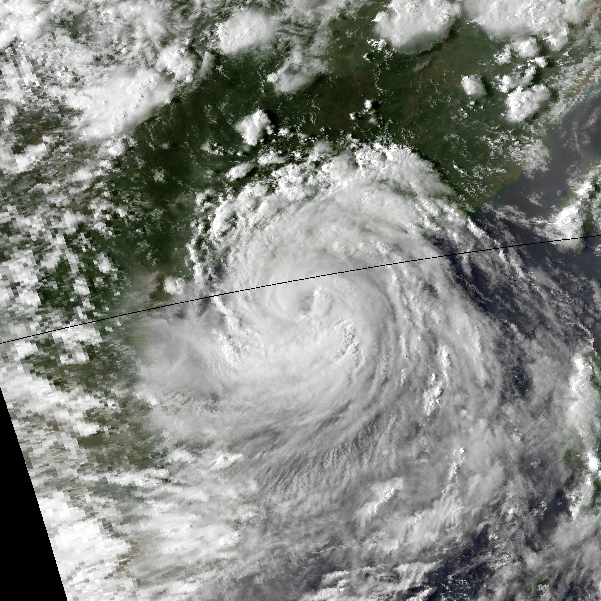
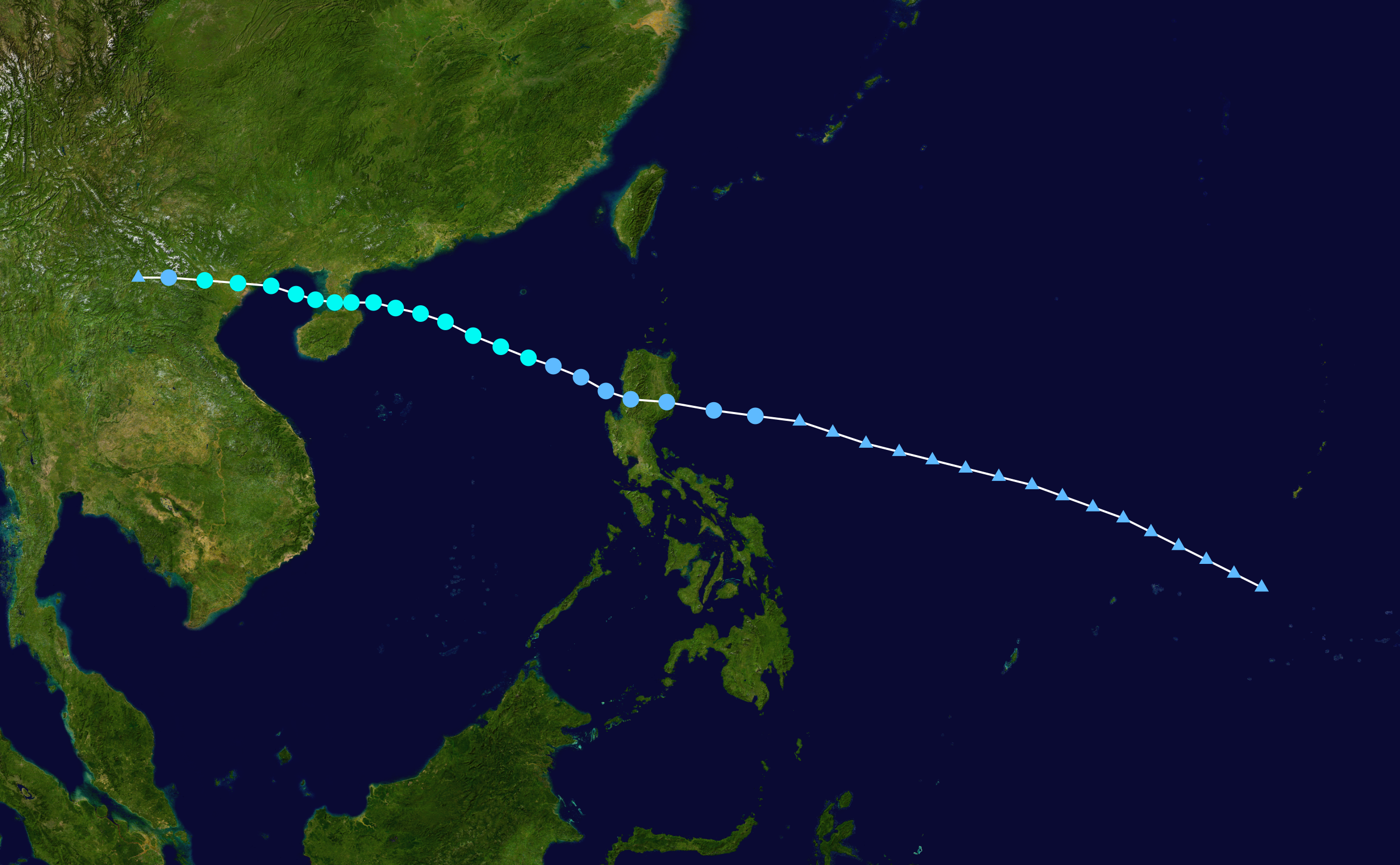
- Duration: August 23 – August 29
- Peak intensity: 85 km/h (50 mph) (10-min); 990 hPa (mbar)

Thunderstorm activity developed within the monsoon trough 465 kilometres (289 mi) southwest of Guam. The system tracked west-northwest, a course it would continue through its life cycle. After crossing the northern portion of Luzon, the system became a tropical depression late on August 25 and a tropical storm on August 26. On the morning of August 27, the cyclone passed south of Hong Kong, bringing wind gusts to 56 knots (104 km/h) at Waglan Island and 76 knots (141 km/h) at Tai Mo Shen in Hong Kong. Harry became a strong tropical storm before moving close to the Chinese coast. Total damage across China from Harry's heavy rainfall totaled 484 million RMB (1994 RMB), or $56.5 million (1994 USD). Weakening thereafter, the storm moved across the Gulf of Tonkin into northern Vietnam, dissipating on August 29.

=== Typhoon Ivy ===
- Typhoon (JMA)
- Category 1 typhoon (SSHWS)
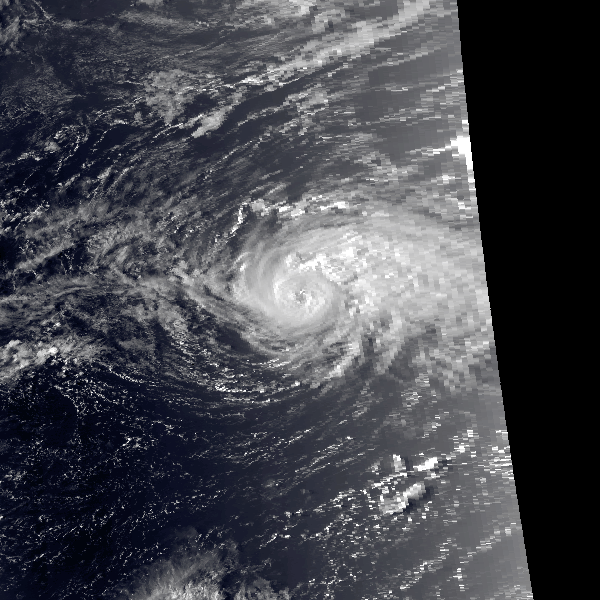
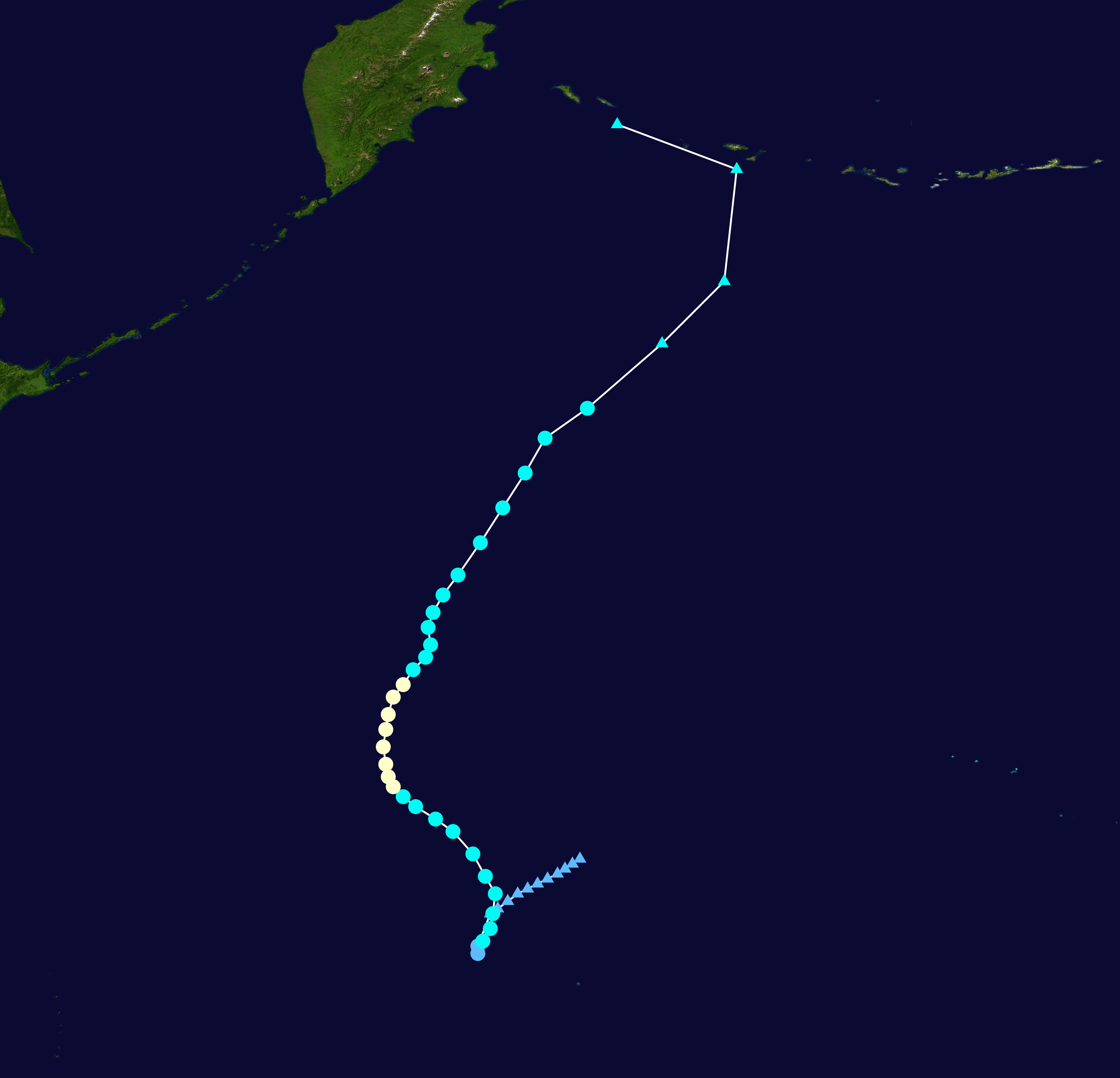
- Duration: August 27 – September 4
- Peak intensity: 140 km/h (85 mph) (10-min); 960 hPa (mbar)

On August 25, a low-pressure area developed in the subtropical western Pacific. The low traveled west-southwest, slowly gaining thunderstorms. On August 28, the system became a tropical depression, then tropical storm, as it turned to the north. Ivy continued to develop, becoming a typhoon on August 31. During early September, the system turned north-northeast and slowly weakened. On September 3, Ivy transitioned into an extratropical cyclone as it linked up with a cold front.

=== Typhoon John ===
- Very strong typhoon (JMA)
- Category 3 typhoon (SSHWS)
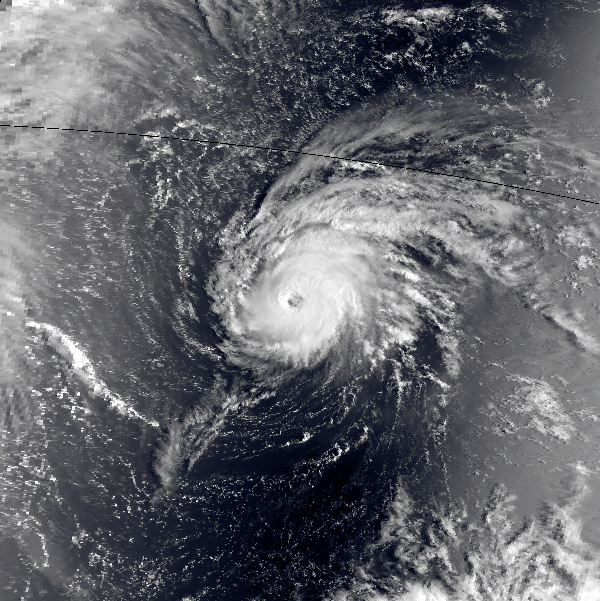
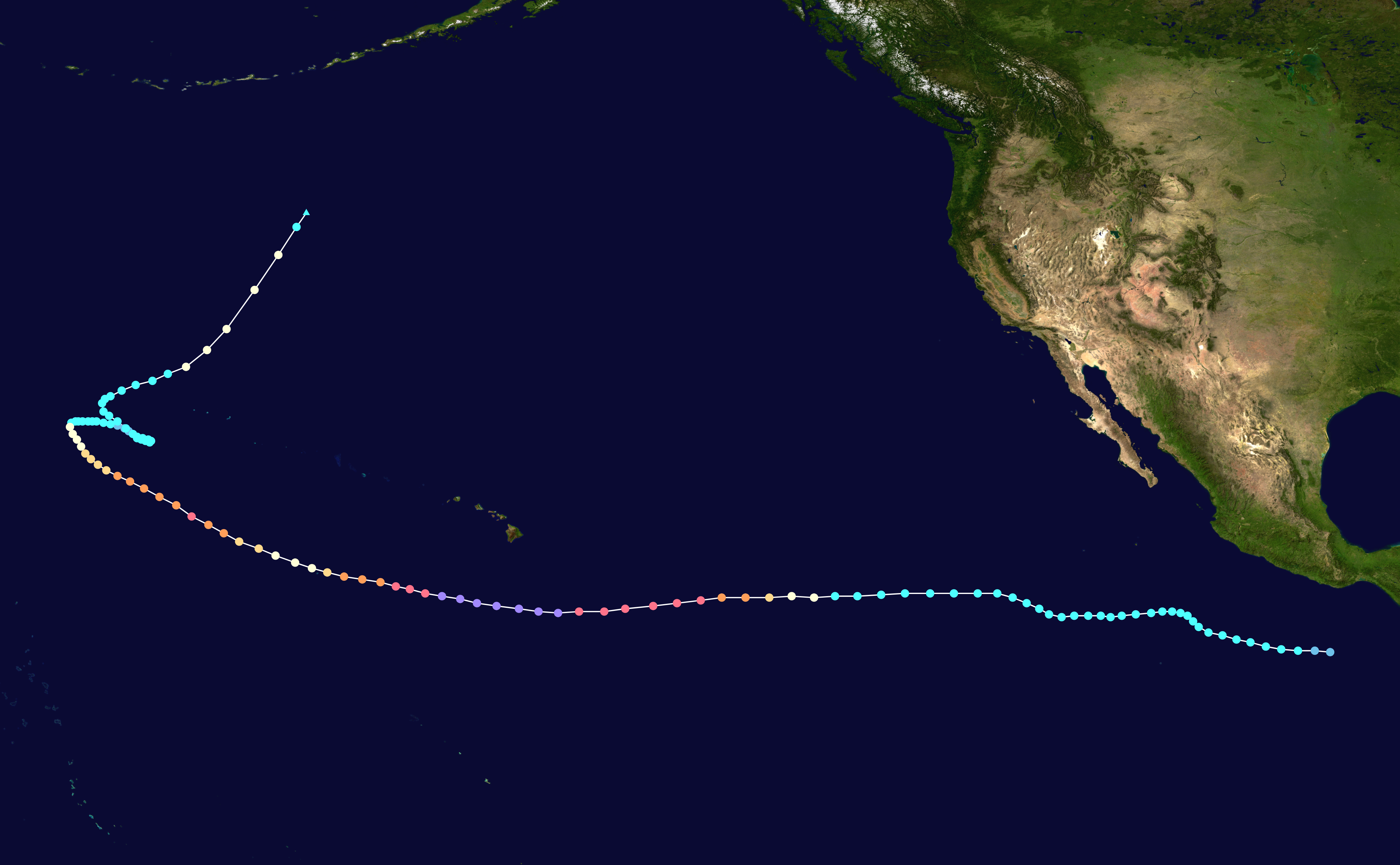
- Duration: August 28 (Entered basin) – September 8 (Exited basin)
- Peak intensity: 155 km/h (100 mph) (10-min); 945 hPa (mbar)

On August 28, Hurricane John, which had formed in the Eastern North Pacific, crossed the International Date Line at 0900 UTC and became a typhoon. Shortly after crossing into the Western North Pacific, John reached its secondary peak of 105 knots (195 km/h). While west-southwest of Midway John started to weaken. This marked the beginning of another intensification period, during which John recrossed the dateline, this time heading east, and out of the Western North Pacific. Two ship reports, at 1500 UTC and 1800 UTC on September 4, indicated that John had sustained winds of 55 knots (102 km/h). No damage from John was reported in the Western North Pacific, although damage was reported from John on Johnston Atoll in the Central Pacific.

=== Tropical Storm Joel ===
- Tropical storm (JMA)
- Tropical storm (SSHWS)
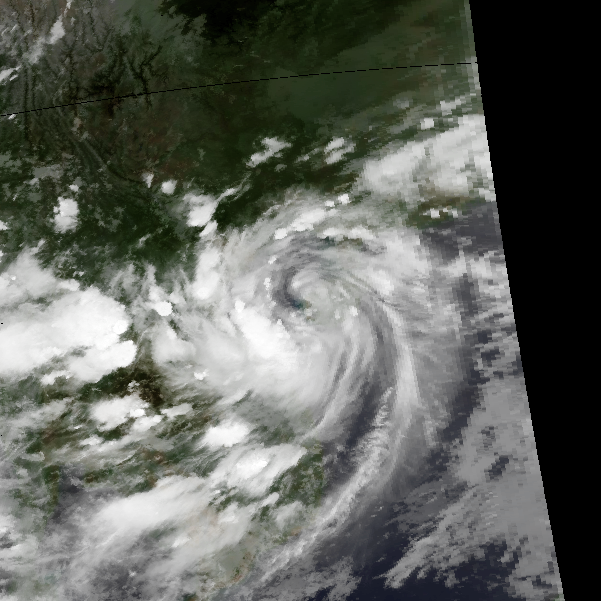
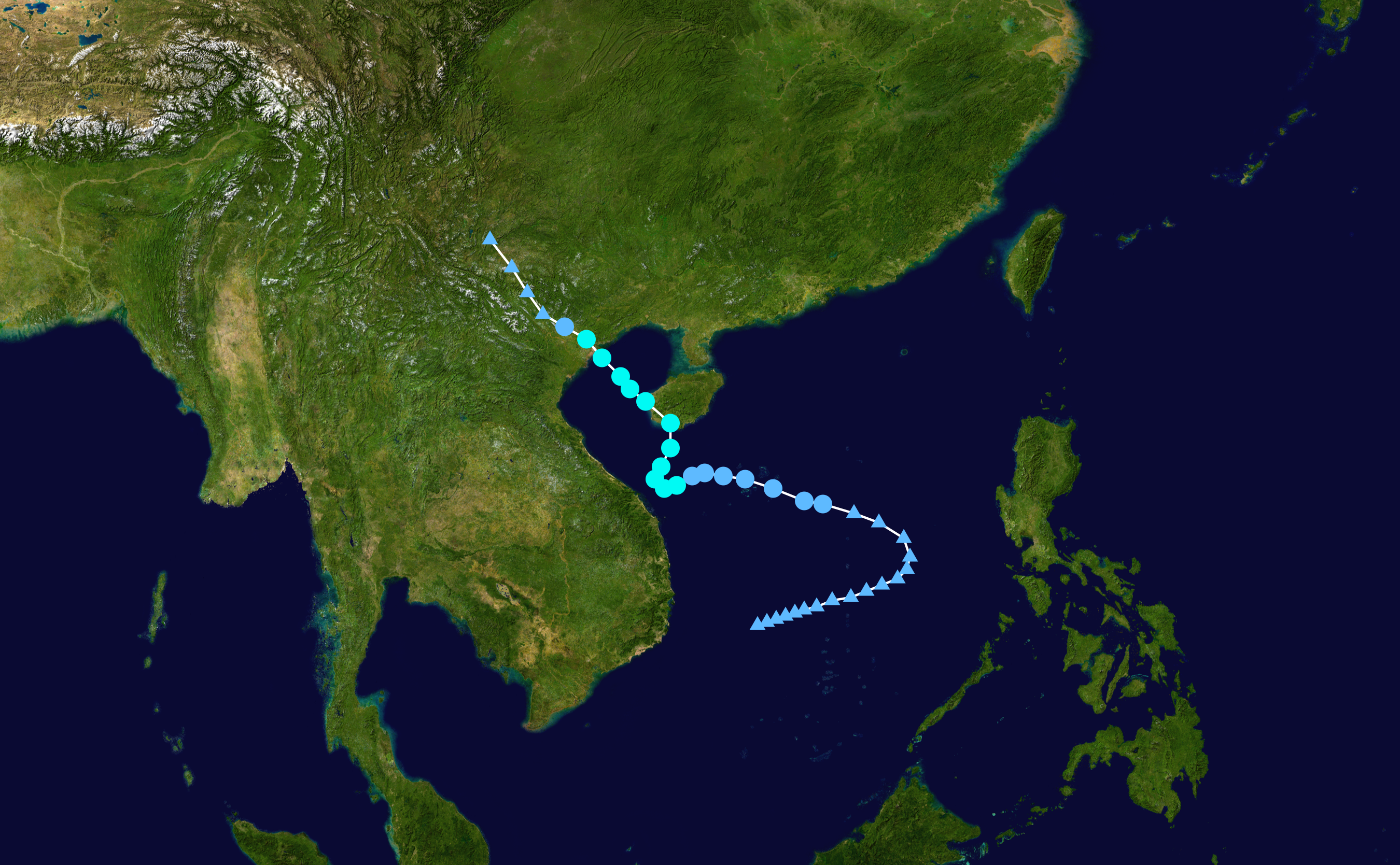
- Duration: September 3 – September 6
- Peak intensity: 85 km/h (50 mph) (10-min); 990 hPa (mbar)

An area of persistent convection within the monsoon trough in the South China Sea on August 30. At first, the disturbance moved east-northeastward, but turned toward the west-northwest on September 2. The disturbance organized into Tropical Depression 23W on September 3. On the morning of September 5, upper-level winds which had affected the deep convection to the north of the depression's circulation centre began to weaken, allowing the convection to wrap around the north side of the system. Based on this, the depression was upgraded to Tropical Storm Joel. The Japan Meteorological Agency upgraded the storm to Tropical Storm 9422 early the next morning local time.

Joel then made a sharp turn towards the north, and made landfall on the southwestern corner of Hainan Island. During passage over land, Joel reached its peak of 45 knots (83 km/h) before turning to the northwest and exiting land into the Gulf of Tonkin. The storm knocked down a few large trees on Hanian. A cloud-filled banding eye then became apparent on visible satellite imagery. Joel made landfall on September 7 near Haiphong, Vietnam before dissipating inland west of Hanoi.

=== Typhoon Kinna ===
- Typhoon (JMA)
- Category 2 typhoon (SSHWS)
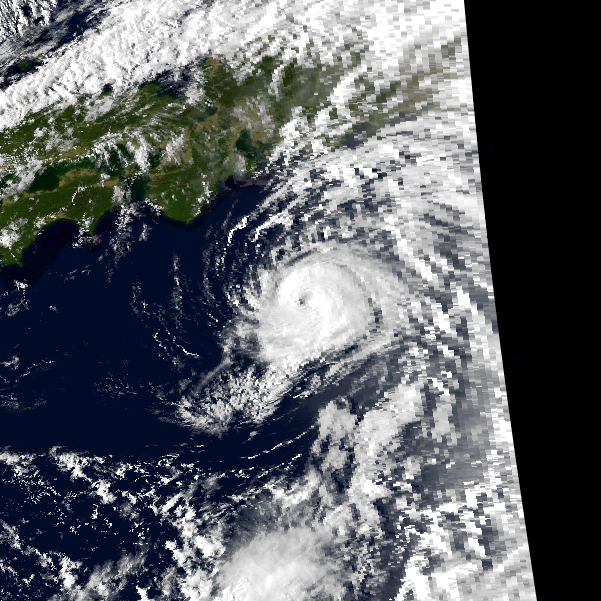
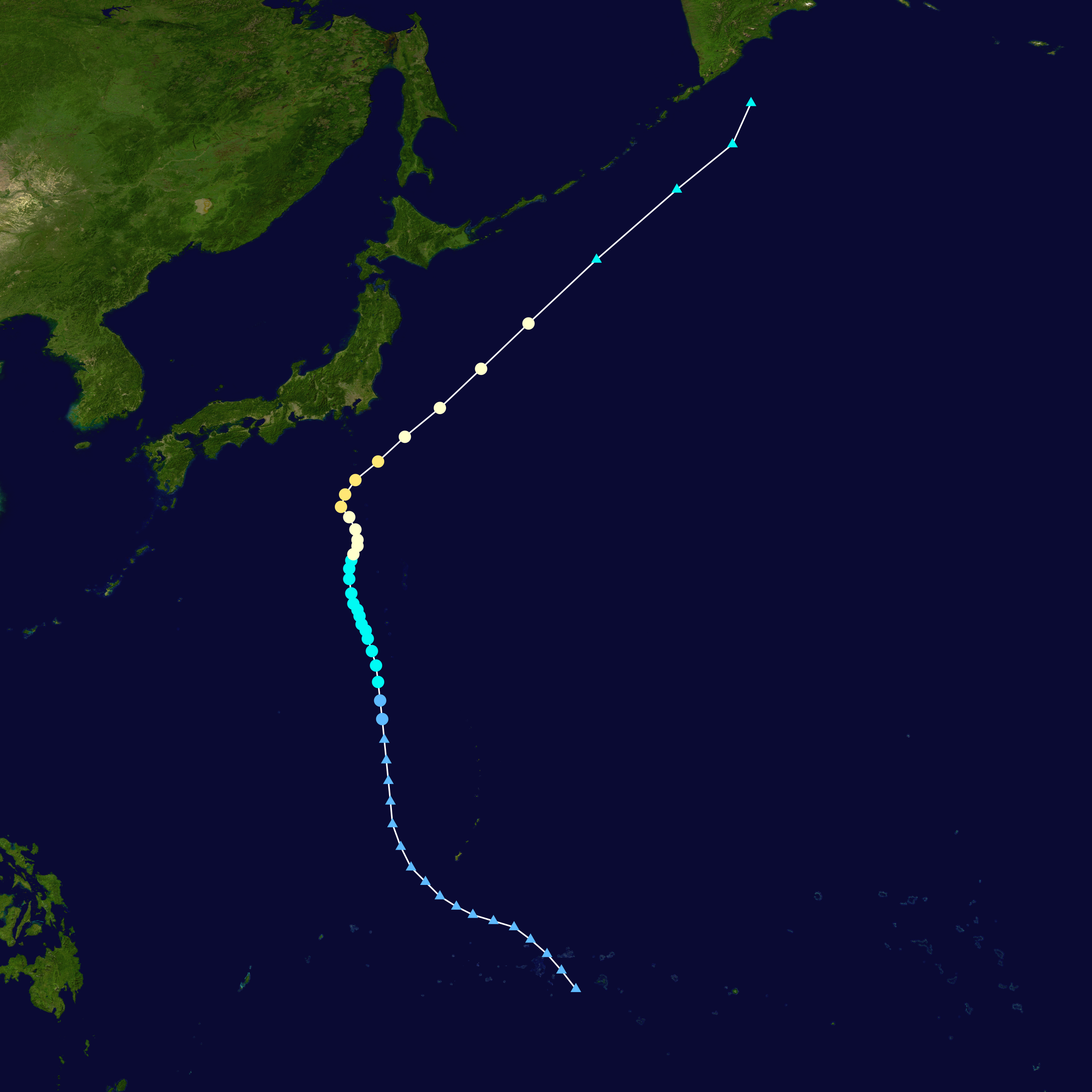
- Duration: September 3 – September 12
- Peak intensity: 140 km/h (85 mph) (10-min); 960 hPa (mbar)

On September 1, an area of thunderstorm activity formed within the monsoon trough. Over the next few days, a monsoon depression formed to its southwest, steering the system northwest to north. After separating from the monsoon depression, it became well enough to organized to be considered a tropical depression on September 5. Strengthening while moving northward, Kinna became a tropical storm on September 6. The system slowed its northward motion until it moved north of the axis of the subtropical ridge on September 10. As it did so, Kinna became a typhoon on September 9. While recurving east of Japan, Kinna brought wind gusts to 60 knots (110 km/h) at Hachijōjima. By late on September 12, Kinna had transitioned into an extratropical cyclone.

=== Tropical Storm Luke (Weling) ===
- Tropical storm (JMA)
- Tropical storm (SSHWS)
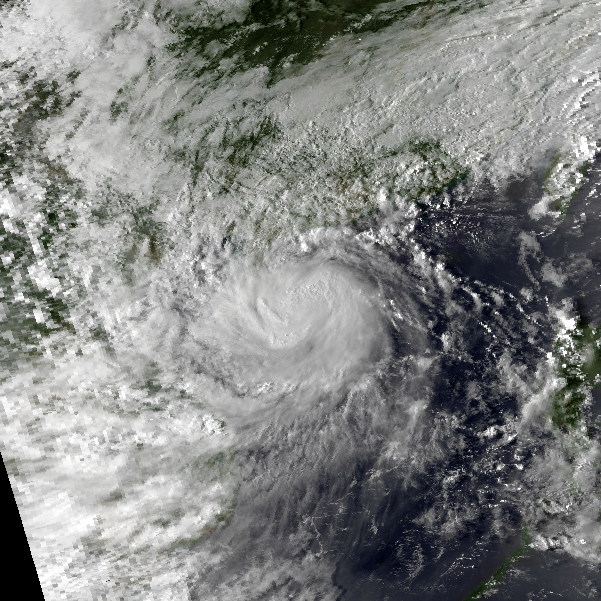
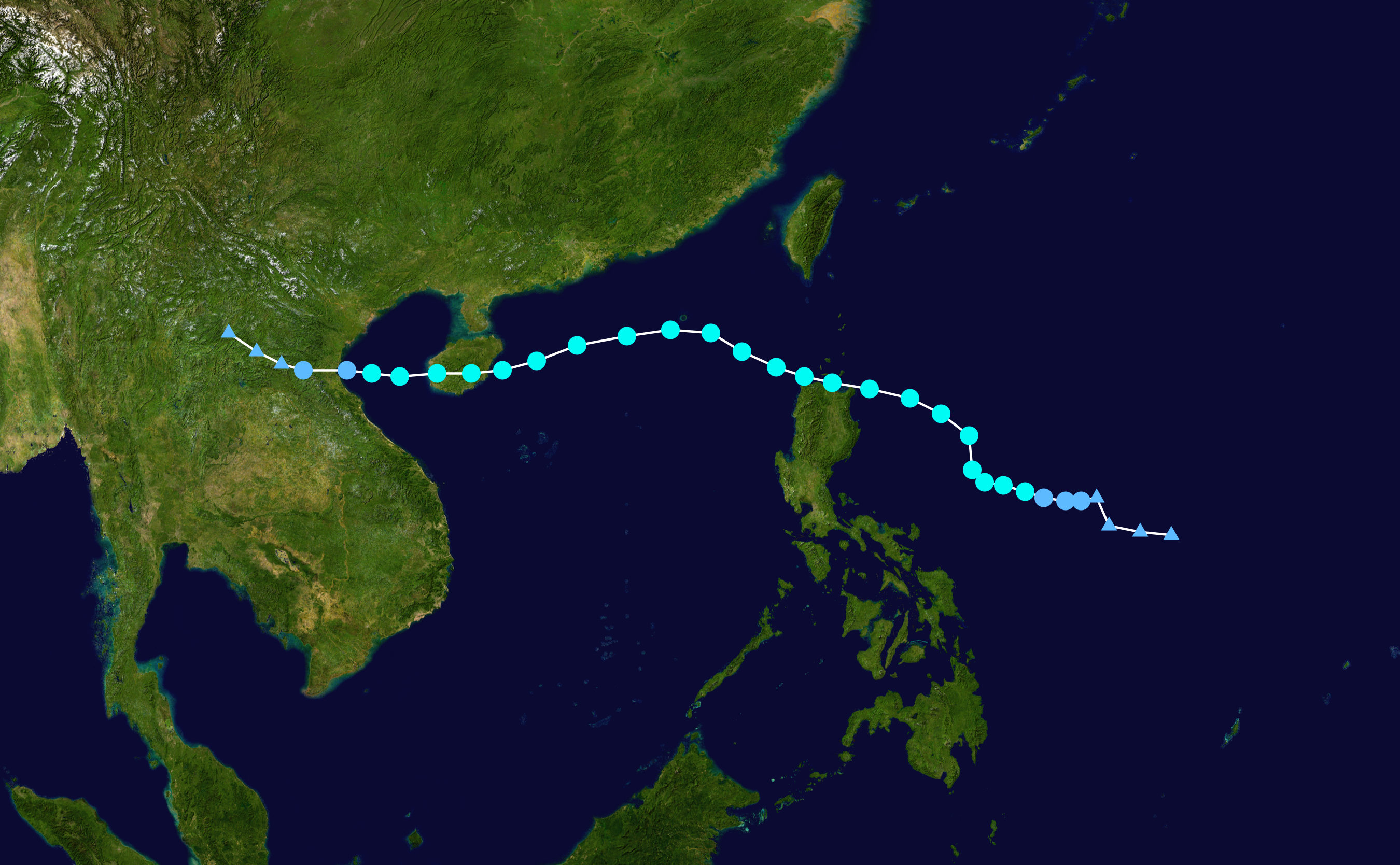
- Duration: September 7 – September 14
- Peak intensity: 85 km/h (50 mph) (10-min); 990 hPa (mbar)

Luke formed out of the monsoon depression which formed southwest of Kinna. Originally becoming a broad monsoon depression on September 3, thunderstorm was slow to form any curvature on its western side. By September 9, the monsoon depression transitioned into Tropical Depression 25W. The depression moved northwest, just to the north of the Philippines. On the afternoon of September 11, the system strengthened into a tropical storm as it turned more to the west. On September 12, the system passed south of Hong Kong. Winds gusted to 50 knots (93 km/h) at Waglan Island as the system passed by. As Luke approached Hainan Island, it weakened due to the island's rough topography. Damage across China totaled over 100 million RMB (1994 RMB), or $11.7 million (1994 USD). The cyclone moved ashore northern Vietnam on September 14 before dissipating.

=== Typhoon Melissa ===
- Violent typhoon (JMA)
- Category 4 super typhoon (SSHWS)
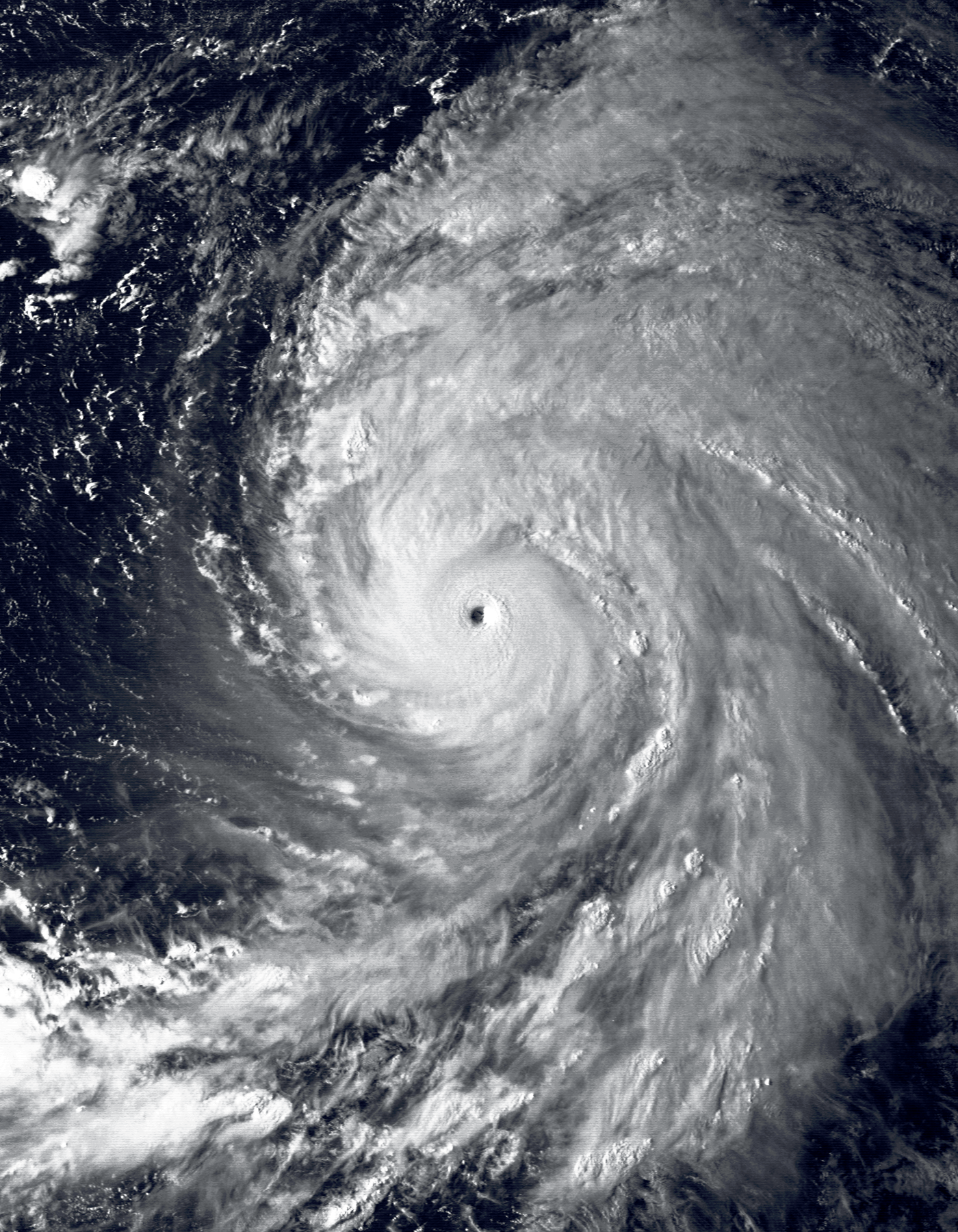
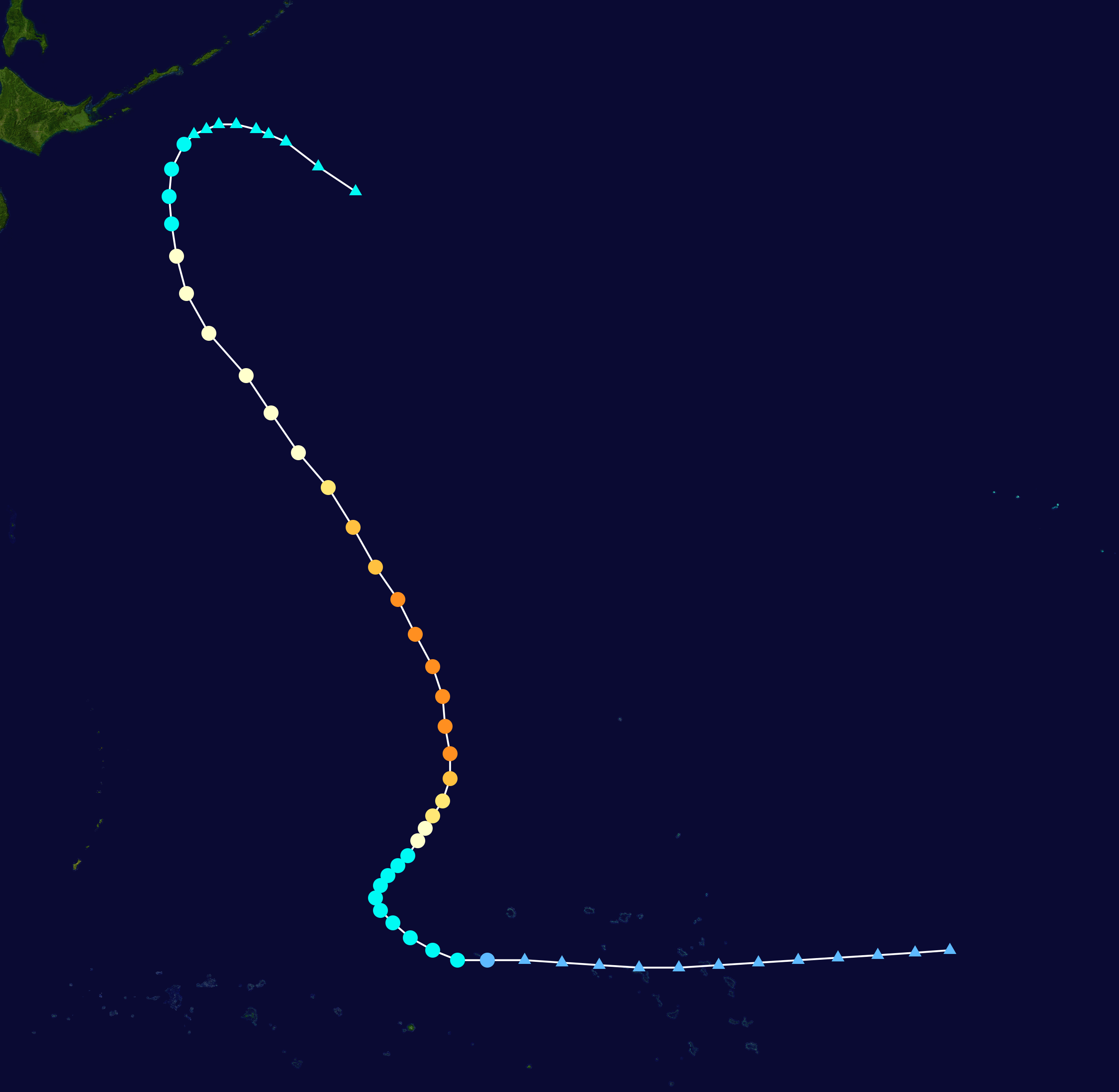
- Duration: September 11 – September 19
- Peak intensity: 205 km/h (125 mph) (10-min); 910 hPa (mbar)

On September 10, a monsoon depression formed in the central Pacific, which had previously absorbed the remains of Hurricane Kristy. By September 11, the system had become well enough organized to be considered a tropical storm. Strong cross equatorial winds steered Melissa to the northeast and led to rapid intensification. Melissa gained typhoon intensity on September 13, and became a super typhoon on September 14. The cyclone then turned northwest and Melissa considerably weakened, becoming a weak tropical storm by September 18. On September 19, Melissa rounded the subtropical ridge axis and recurved, becoming a large extratropical cyclone on September 21 and dissipated, affecting Canada and Alaska on September 23. In Japan, three were killed during Melissa's passage near the country.

=== Tropical Storm Nat ===
- Tropical storm (JMA)
- Tropical storm (SSHWS)
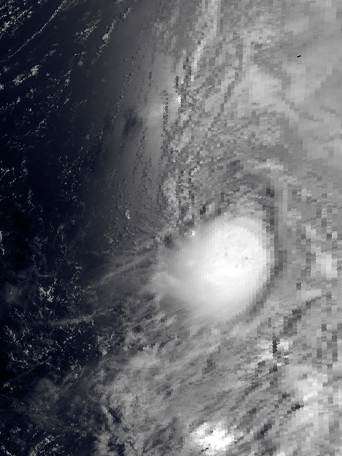
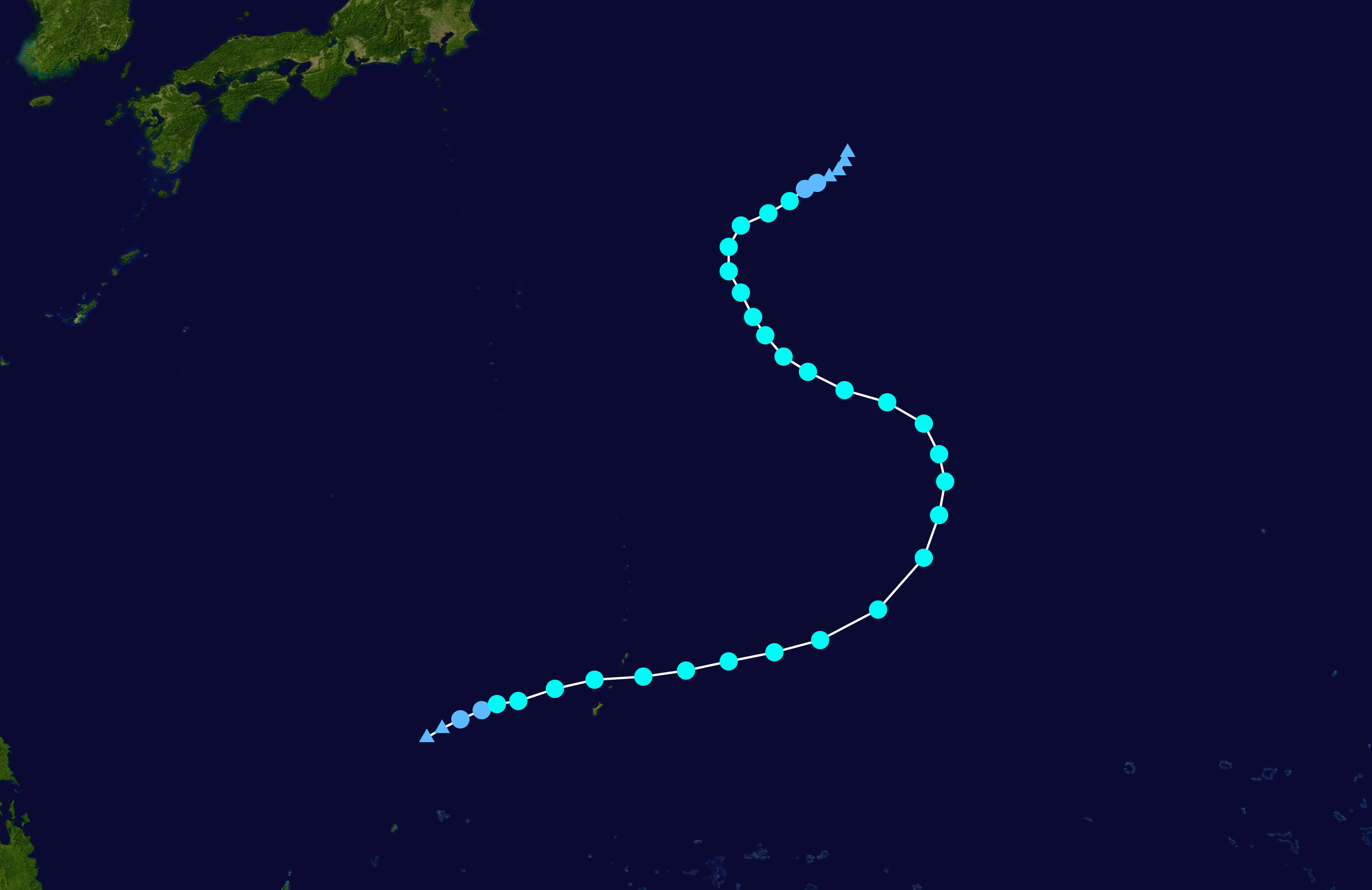
- Duration: September 15 – September 22
- Peak intensity: 75 km/h (45 mph) (10-min); 992 hPa (mbar)

Nat formed from an area of thunderstorms which formed along a trough trailing from Melissa. First noted on September 14, the system developed into a tropical depression and tropical storm on September 15. At this point in its life cycle it approached Guam from the west, when a squall line moved across the island, bringing wind gusts to 48 knots (89 km/h). One person drowned when knocked into the ocean, while 24 were injured, most of which due to a lightning strike which occurred in the wake of Nat along its trailing surface trough. Nat continued moving east to northeast initially before turning to the northwest by September 19, then turned back to the northeast by September 21, eventually dissipating in the subtropical western Pacific Ocean.

=== Typhoon Orchid (Aning) ===
- Very strong typhoon (JMA)
- Category 4 super typhoon (SSHWS)
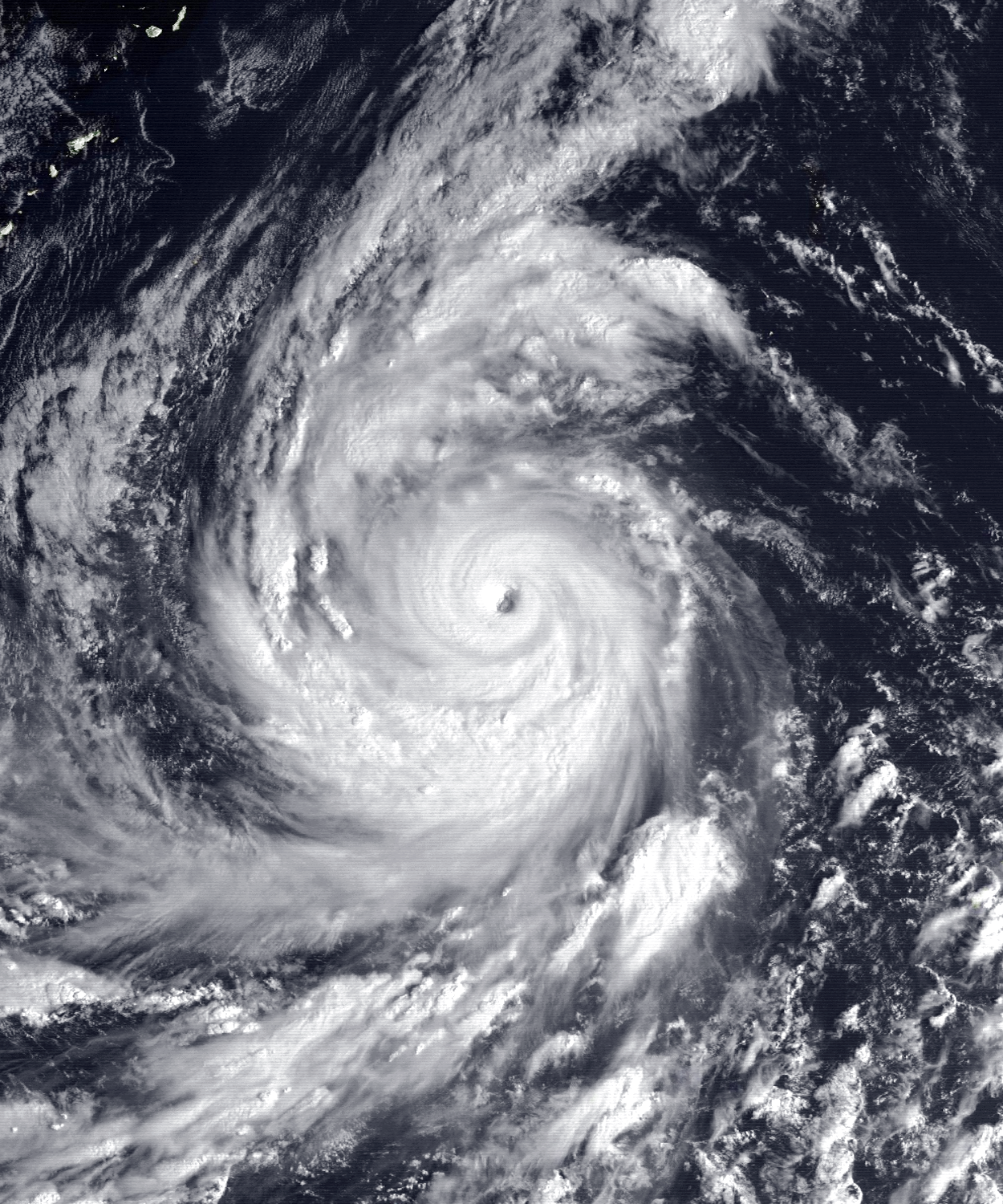
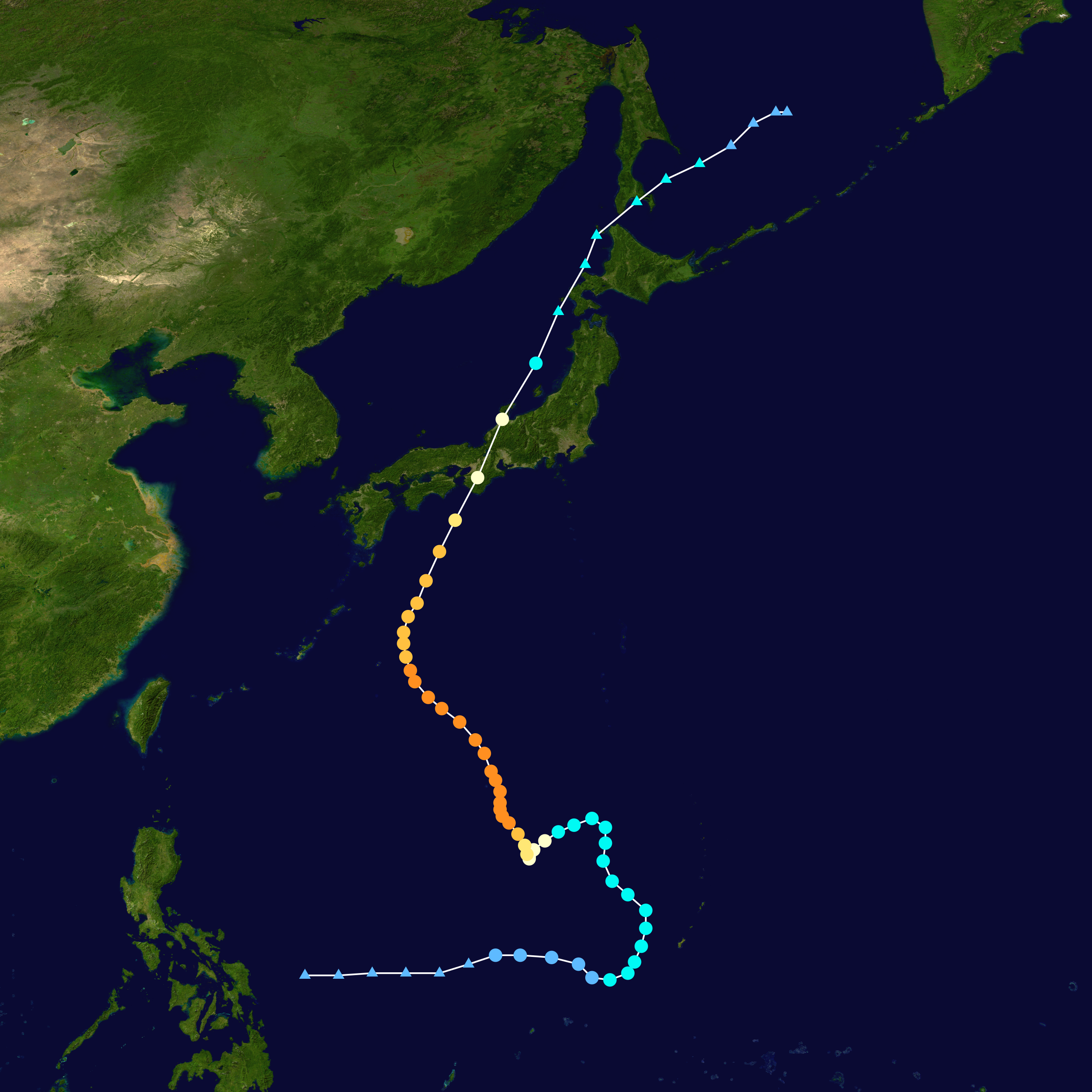
- Duration: September 17 – September 30
- Peak intensity: 185 km/h (115 mph) (10-min); 925 hPa (mbar)

A tropical disturbance formed east of the Philippines along a surface trough trailing from Nat. In the prevailing westerly flow, the disturbance moved eastward. The system organized into a tropical depression on September 18. The system turned northward, developing into a tropical storm. As it bypassed Guam to the northwest, winds gusted to 46 knots (85 km/h) on the island. Slowly turning towards the northwest, and ultimately southwest around a monsoon gyre, Orchid slowly intensified into a typhoon. On September 22, Orchid turned northwest and continued to strengthen, peaking as a super typhoon on September 25. Slowly weakening thereafter, Orchid began to slow during recurvature as it rounded the western side of the subtropical ridge. Acceleration to the north-northeast began on September 28, and by late on September 29, Orchid made landfall in Japan as a typhoon, crossing Honshu and western Hokkaido. Winds gusted to 92 knots (170 km/h) at Tanabe. Rainfall from Orchid across central Japan was beneficial, as it helped relieve drought conditions. Nine perished during Orchid's passage across Japan. Damage totaled to ¥128 million (US$1.25 million).

=== Typhoon Pat ===
- Typhoon (JMA)
- Category 2 typhoon (SSHWS)
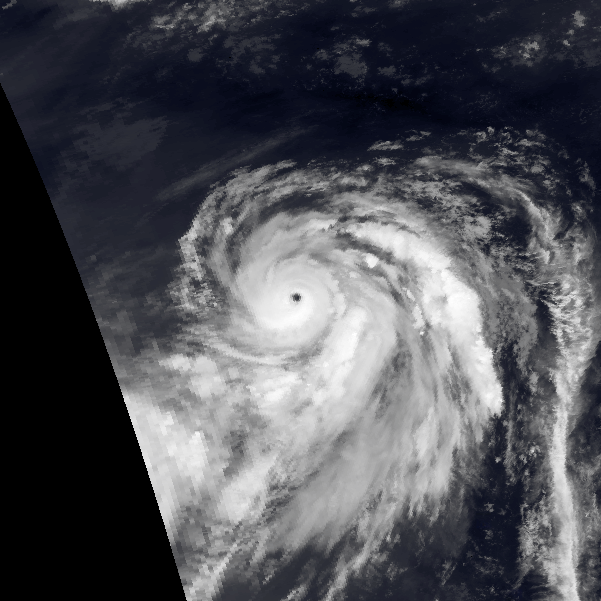
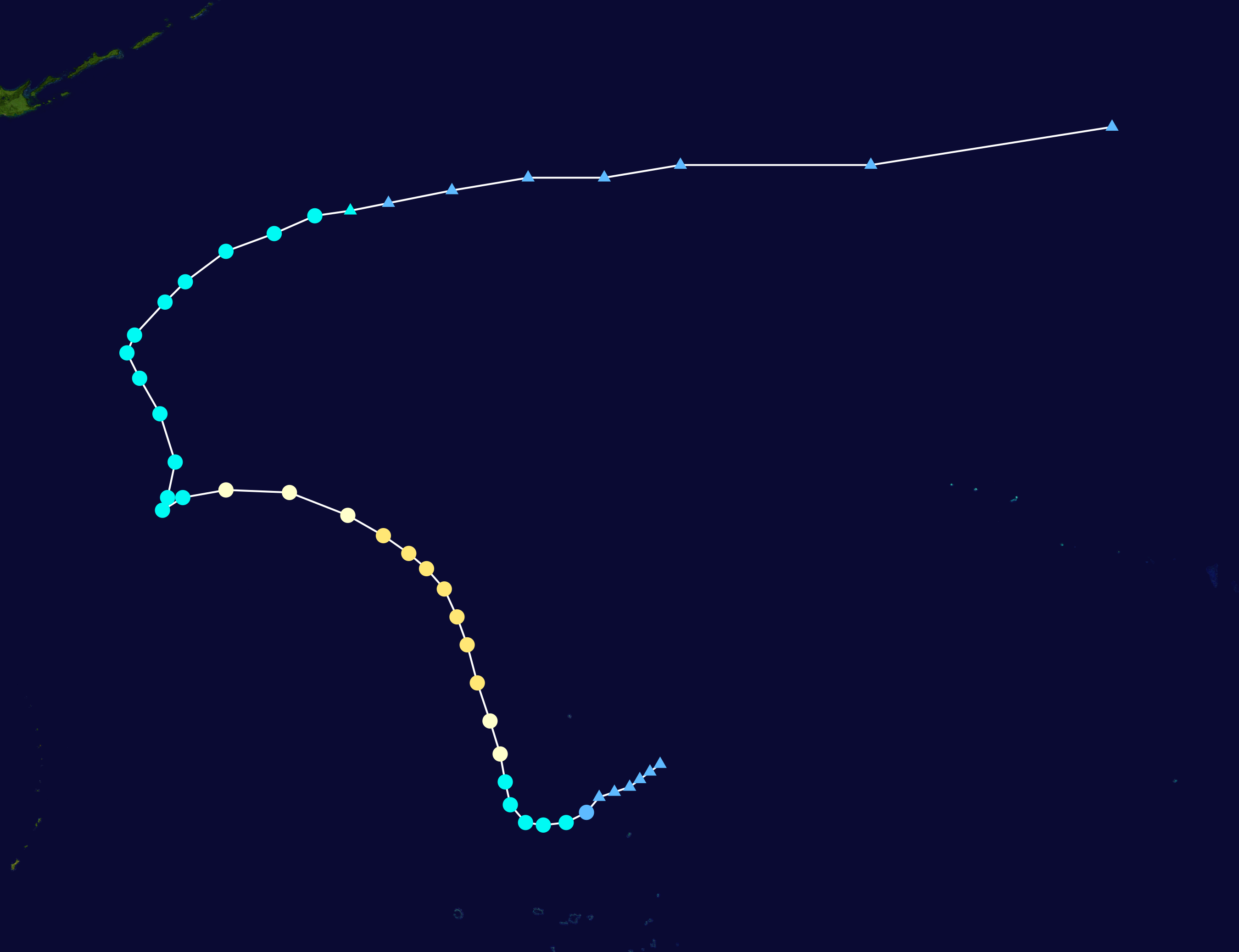
- Duration: September 21 – September 28
- Peak intensity: 130 km/h (80 mph) (10-min); 965 hPa (mbar)

Pat formed on the east end of the monsoon trough as a tropical disturbance on September 20 near Wake Island, moving west-southwest. The system organized into a tropical depression on September 21. Turning to the northwest, Pat quickly strengthened into a typhoon by September 23. Soon afterward, Typhoon Pat turned westward and weakened, beginning its interaction with Tropical Storm Ruth located to Pat's southwest. On September 24, Pat and Ruth began to orbit around each other, entrapped within a Fujiwhara interaction. By the morning of September 26, the two cyclones merged and both systems' thunderstorm activity fell apart, a condition which continued after the merger. Over the next couple days, the merged cyclone regained central convection and recurved east of Japan.

=== Tropical Storm Ruth ===
- Tropical storm (JMA)
- Tropical storm (SSHWS)
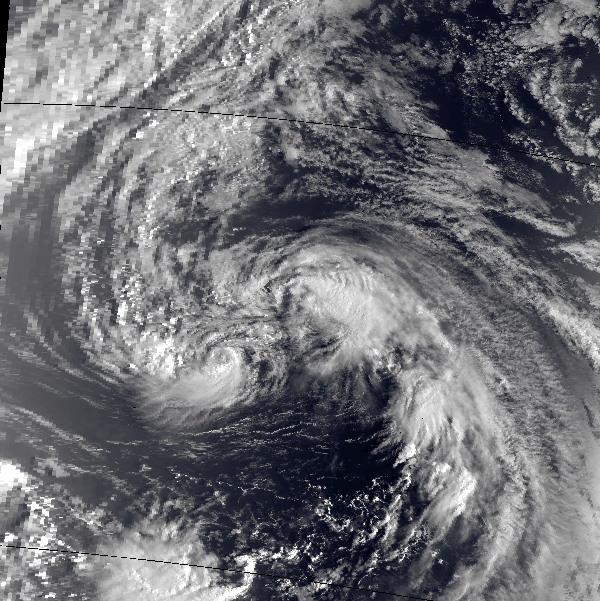
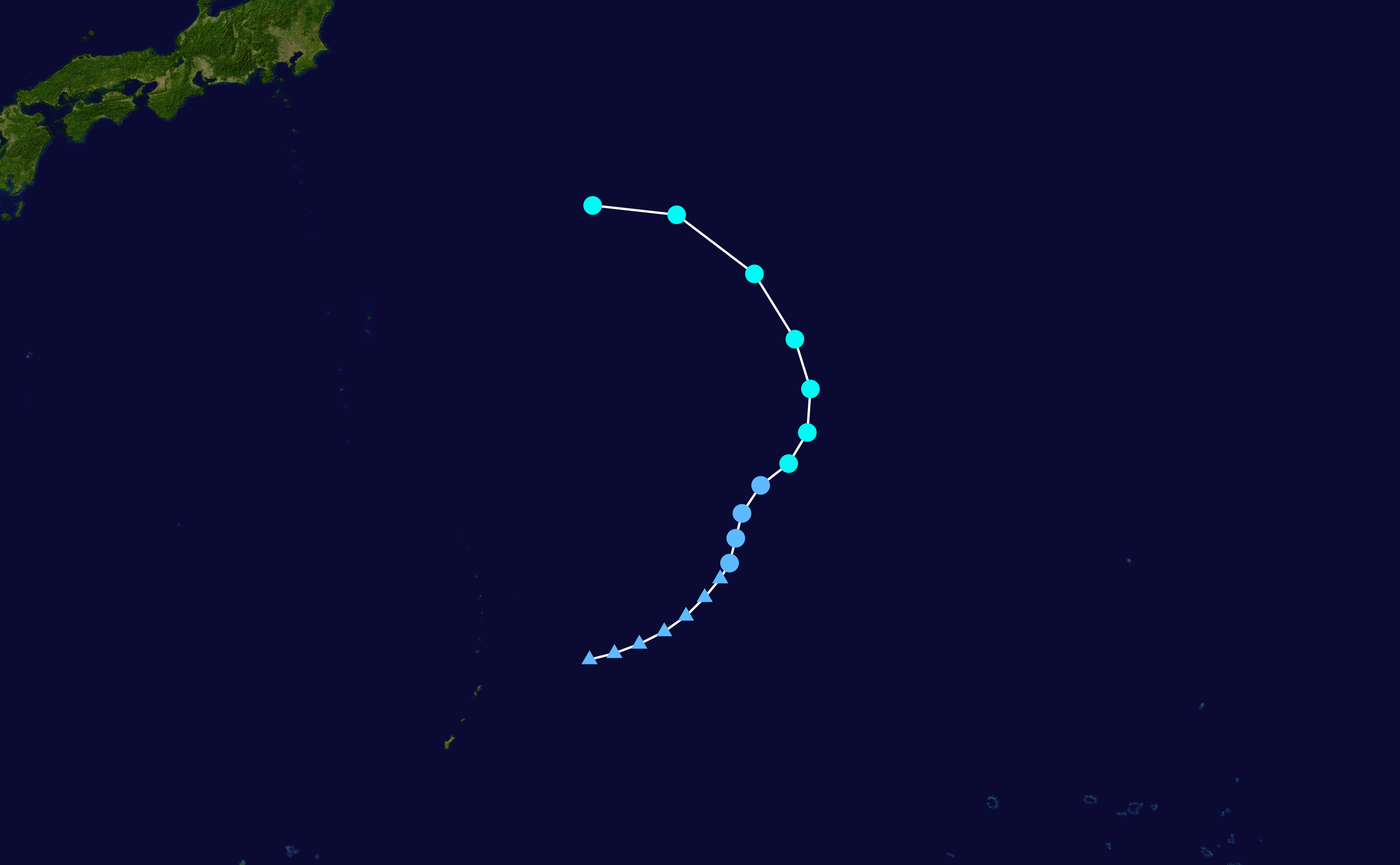
- Duration: September 24 – September 26
- Peak intensity: 75 km/h (45 mph) (10-min); 996 hPa (mbar)

An area of thunderstorm activity formed between Orchid and Pat on September 23. The system developed, becoming Tropical Depression 30W on September 24. A day later, the cyclone achieved tropical storm strength. Ruth moved northeast within a general southwest flow regime, as the smaller tropical cyclone named Pat approached from the northeast. By September 26, the two cyclones merged, and the resultant cyclone recurved east of Japan.

=== Typhoon Seth (Bidang) ===
- Violent typhoon (JMA)
- Category 4 typhoon (SSHWS)
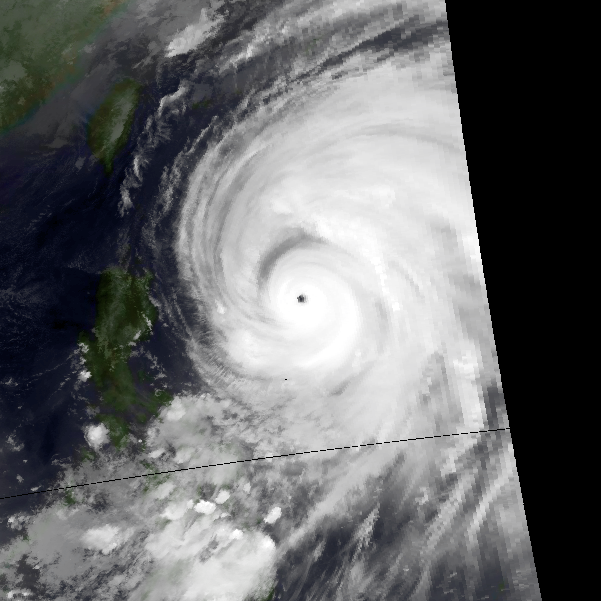
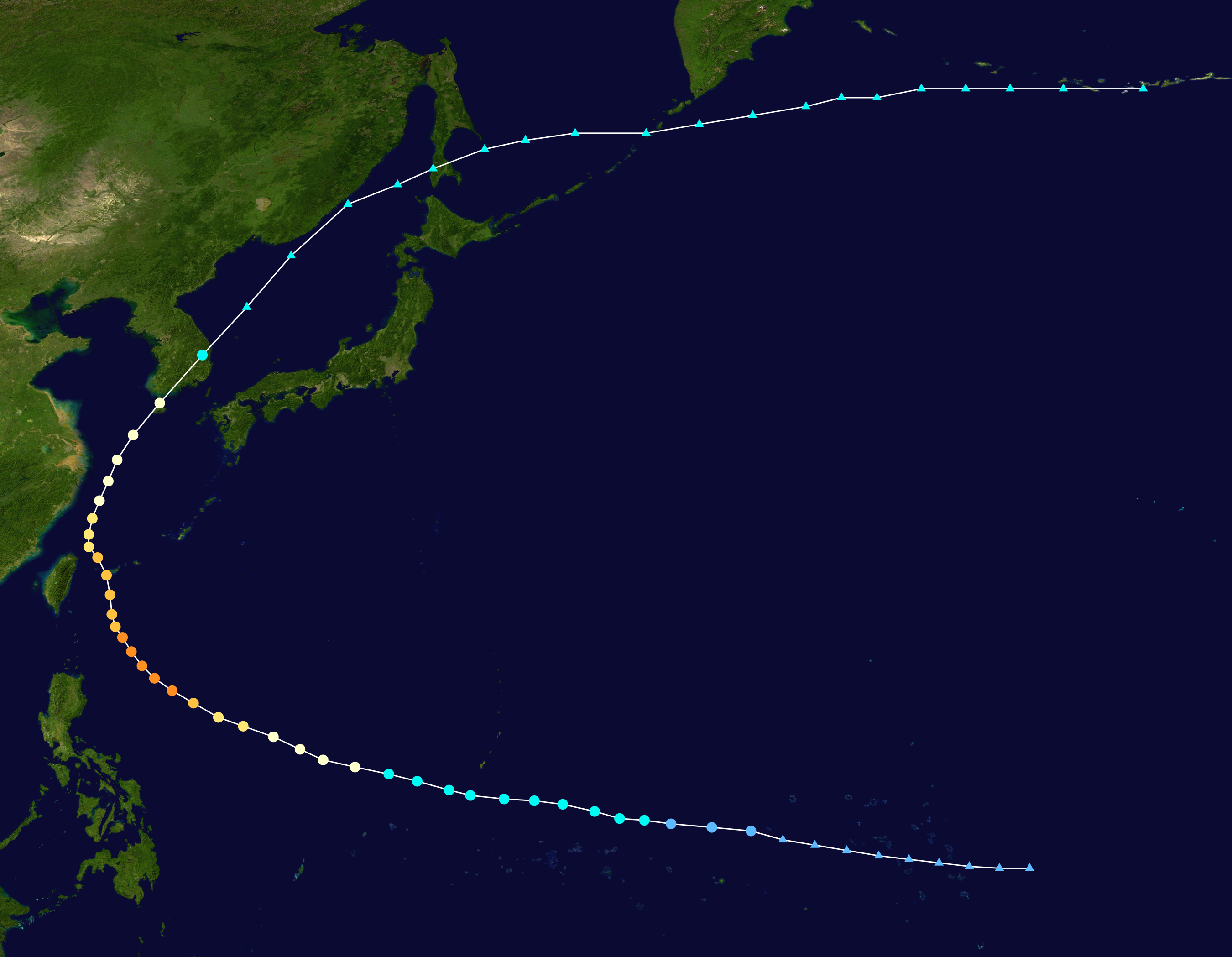
- Duration: October 3 – October 12
- Peak intensity: 205 km/h (125 mph) (10-min); 910 hPa (mbar)

An area of thunderstorm activity formed near the Marshall Islands, moving westward in a regime which showed an atypically weak monsoon trough. On October 1, a low level circulation developed in association with the convection. Slow development occurred, and the system strengthened into a tropical depression on October 3. Winds gusted to 41 knots (76 km/h) as Seth passed south of Guam on October 5. Developing at a modest pace as it moved west-northwest, the cyclone strengthened into a typhoon on October 6. Seth strengthened into a strong typhoon on October 7, recurving around the periphery of the subtropical ridge, missing Taiwan to the east. Heavy rainfall and high winds across the island led to eight deaths, and NT$60 million (1994 dollars), or $2.3 million (1994 USD), in damage.

As it moved through the Ryukyu Islands, winds gusted to 110 knots (200 km/h) Yonaguni Jima. The cyclone accelerated as it approached Korea as a typhoon which had begun to transition into a nontropical low. At Cheju Do, winds peaked at 78 knots (144 km/h) as Seth passed by. Rainfall amounts measured across South Korea were in excess of 300 millimetres (12 in). Although the rainfall generally relieved drought conditions, one person perished due to flooding in Samchok. Seth become an extratropical cyclone soon after crossing the peninsula on October 12.

=== Typhoon Teresa (Katring) ===
- Typhoon (JMA)
- Category 1 typhoon (SSHWS)
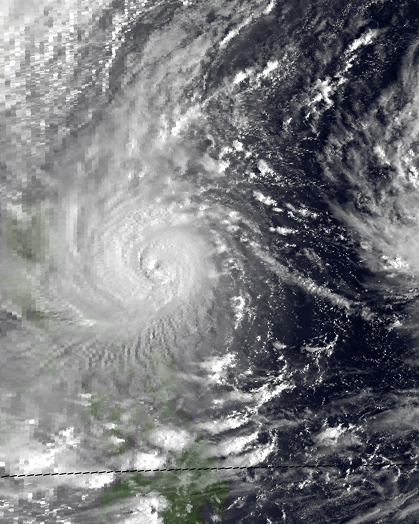
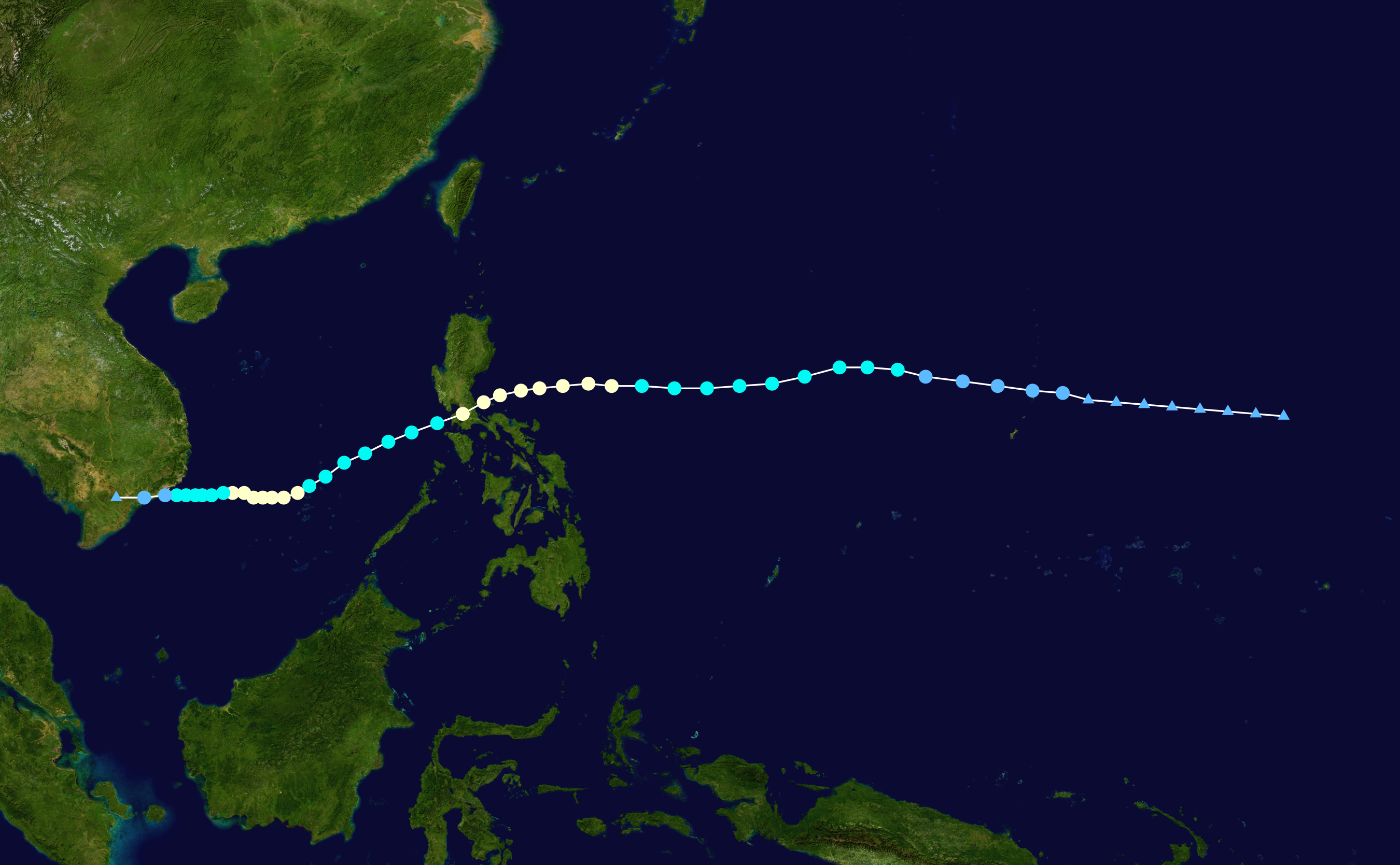
- Duration: October 16 – October 26
- Peak intensity: 150 km/h (90 mph) (10-min); 955 hPa (mbar)

Typhoon Teresa (named Katring by PAGASA) was at one point one of four tropical cyclones that existed simultaneously in the Western North Pacific, and it was the westernmost of the four. This system was first noted as a tropical disturbance on October 15 while about 550 kilometres (340 mi) east of the southern Mariana Islands. The system moved west and passed north of Guam near Saipan on October 16 at around 0600 UTC.

Slowly organizing, the system evolved into Tropical Depression 34W early on October 16, and a tropical storm later in the day. Teresa continued moving westward at a constant pace and intensified into a typhoon on October 19, reaching its peak intensity of 80 knots (150 km/h) that same day. Teresa crossed the central Philippines on a west-southwestward track, passing just south of Manila. It had weakened to a severe tropical storm by the time it exited the Philippine islands. The storm continued on a southwestward motion, slowly re-intensifying, and it had regained typhoon strength by October 23. The storm then slowed and turned toward the west, and slowly weakened as it moved towards the coast of Vietnam. The final warning was issued by the JTWC when Teresa was still a tropical storm, but weakening over water east of Vietnam. The remnants of Teresa made landfall in southern Vietnam late on October 26.

Teresa left at least 14 dead and 11 injured in the Philippines, and caused heavy damage to rice and coconut plantations. Electricity was cut off in Manila and surrounding areas. Trees were also reported uprooted, and utility poles brought down. A Maltese oil tanker located in the South China Sea about 600 kilometres (370 mi) southeast of Hong Kong split into two and capsized, killing two and leaving 14 missing. The other crew members were rescued. Typhoon Teresa caused a total of $67.4 million (1994 USD) in damage in Laguna, Batangas, Rizal and Cavite Provinces in the Philippines.

=== Typhoon Verne (Delang) ===
- Typhoon (JMA)
- Category 4 typhoon (SSHWS)
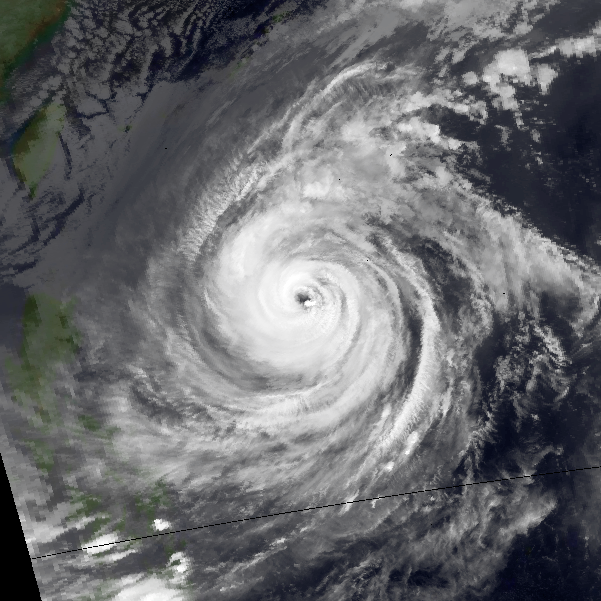
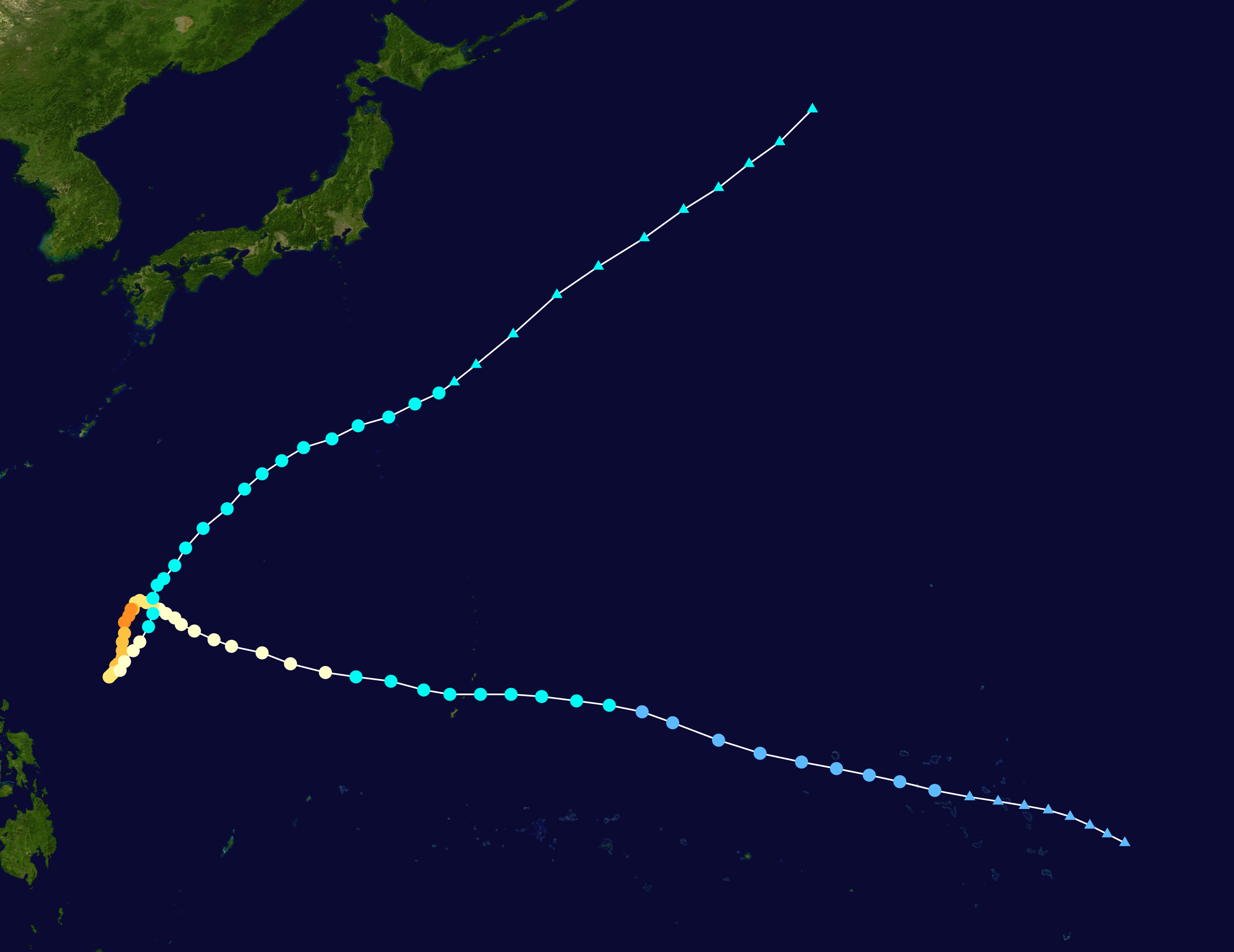
- Duration: October 16 – November 1
- Peak intensity: 150 km/h (90 mph) (10-min); 950 hPa (mbar)

An area of organized thunderstorm activity formed on October 14 in the Marshall Islands. Late on October 15, the system formed into a tropical depression. The system slowly developed as it moved west-northwest, becoming a tropical storm on October 18. The system passed north of Guam, bringing over 75 millimetres (3.0 in) of rainfall to much of the island, and winds gusted up to 60 knots (110 km/h). By October 20, Verne had developed into a typhoon. Late on October 21, steering currents collapsed, and Verne stalled for nearly a week. Verne became a strong typhoon on October 24. Turning northward on October 26, the system slowly weakened east of mainland Asia, and on October 28 Verne weakened back into a tropical storm. On November 1, Verne became an extratropical cyclone as it moved east of Japan.

=== Typhoon Wilda ===
- Very strong typhoon (JMA)
- Category 4 typhoon (SSHWS)
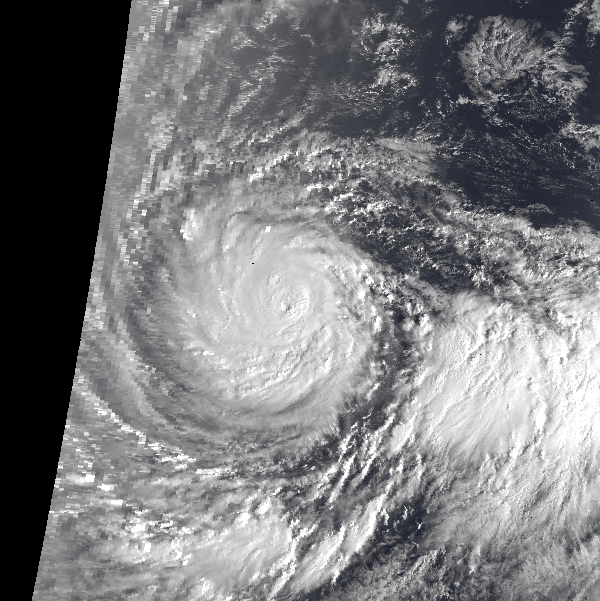
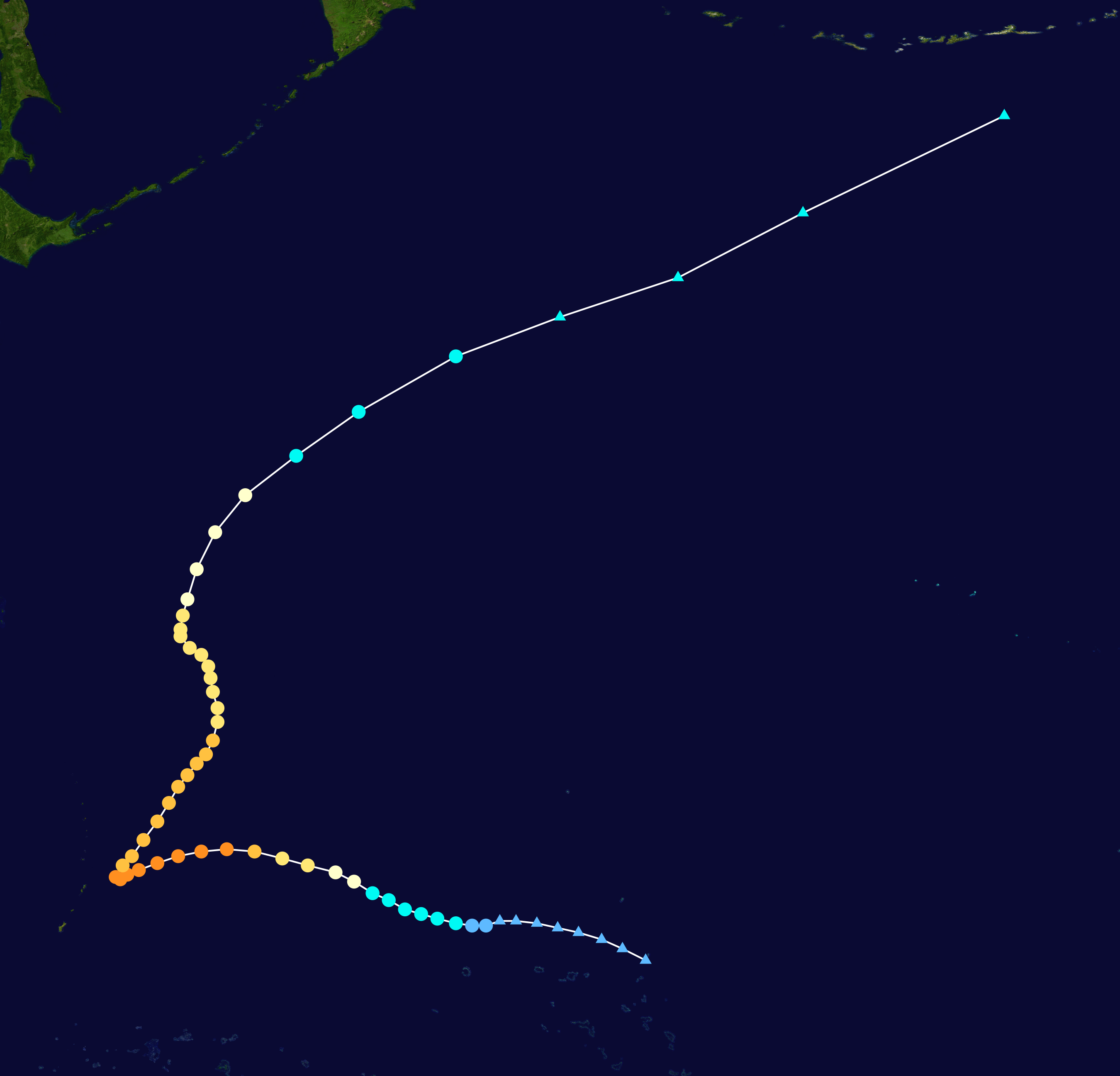
- Duration: October 19 – November 1
- Peak intensity: 165 km/h (105 mph) (10-min); 935 hPa (mbar)

Forming along the trough axis in which Teresa and Verne, a tropical disturbance formed on October 18 in the central tropical Pacific. The system slowly developed, becoming a tropical depression on October 19. The depression moved west-northwestward, becoming a tropical storm on October 20. After becoming a typhoon, Wilda turned west-southwest towards Saipan. From late on October 24 through late on October 25, Wilda stalled 170 kilometres (110 mi) east-northeast of Saipan, slowly weakening. Up to 4.95 inches (126 mm) fell across the central portion of Guam while winds gusted to 74 knots (137 km/h) as Wilda stalled to the northeast. The system then turned northeast along the now reverse-oriented monsoon trough due to a weakness in the subtropical ridge to its north until October 28, before bending back to the north-northwest. Late on October 29, Wilda turned back to the northeast and began to accelerate, with the system evolving into an extratropical cyclone on November 1.

=== Tropical Storm Yuri ===
- Tropical storm (JMA)
- Tropical storm (SSHWS)
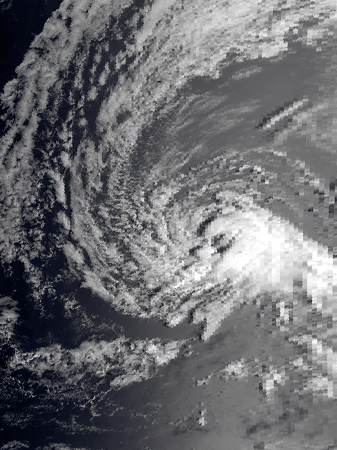
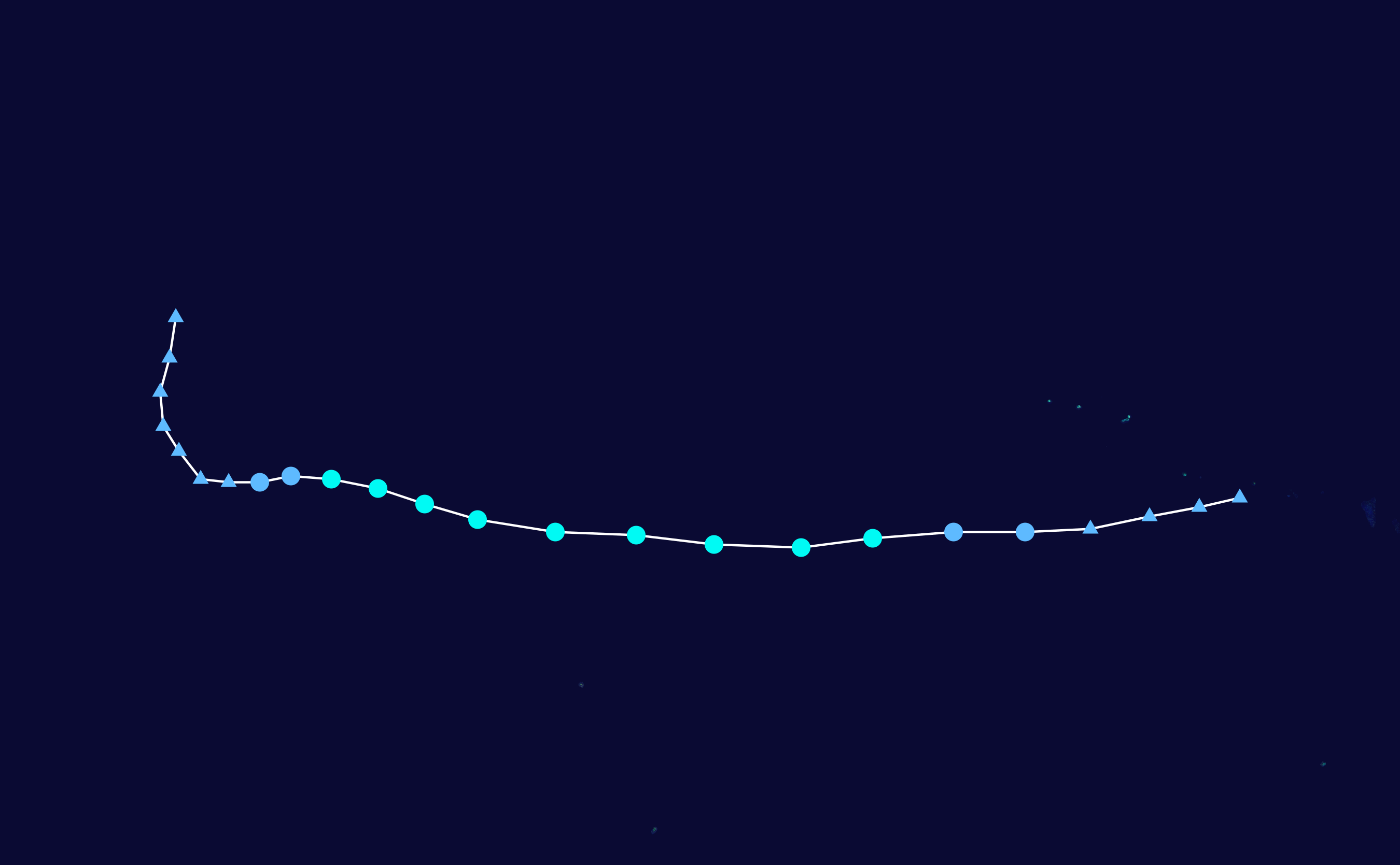
- Duration: October 22 – October 26
- Peak intensity: 75 km/h (45 mph) (10-min); 996 hPa (mbar)

On October 22, an area of convection formed northwest of Hawaii in association with a tropical upper tropospheric trough. Moving rapidly westward, the low-level circulation center associated with the convective clouds crossed the International Date Line later that day. The first mention of this system by the Joint Typhoon Warning Center in their Significant Tropical Weather Advisory six hours later noted that the low-level circulation had been developing under the TUTT cell. Slowly developing, on October 23, the system organized into Tropical Depression 36W. The Japan Meteorological Agency upgraded the system to Tropical Storm 9433 at 1200 UTC that day, shortly before the JTWC decided to upgrade the depression to Tropical Storm Yuri. The JTWC upgrade was based on a small area of deep convection which had formed to the southeast of the low-level centre, as well as a rapid low-level cloud motion of 40 knots (74 km/h) that was observed to the north of the circulation.

Yuri remained a minimal tropical storm for the next two days or so before it was downgraded to a tropical depression because of a lack of deep convection and a weakening in its appearance on satellite imagery. The final warning was issued a few hours later on October 25. A weak wind of 11 knots (20 km/h) associated with the dissipating system was recorded at Chichi-jima on October 25.

=== Typhoon Zelda (Esang) ===
- Violent typhoon (JMA)
- Category 4 super typhoon (SSHWS)
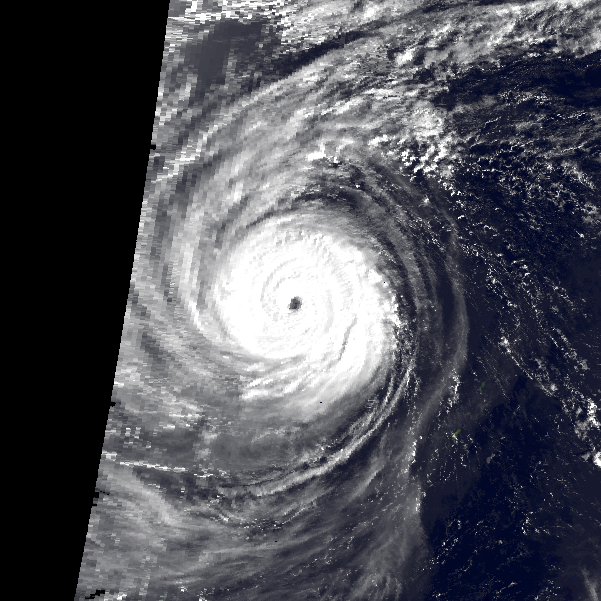
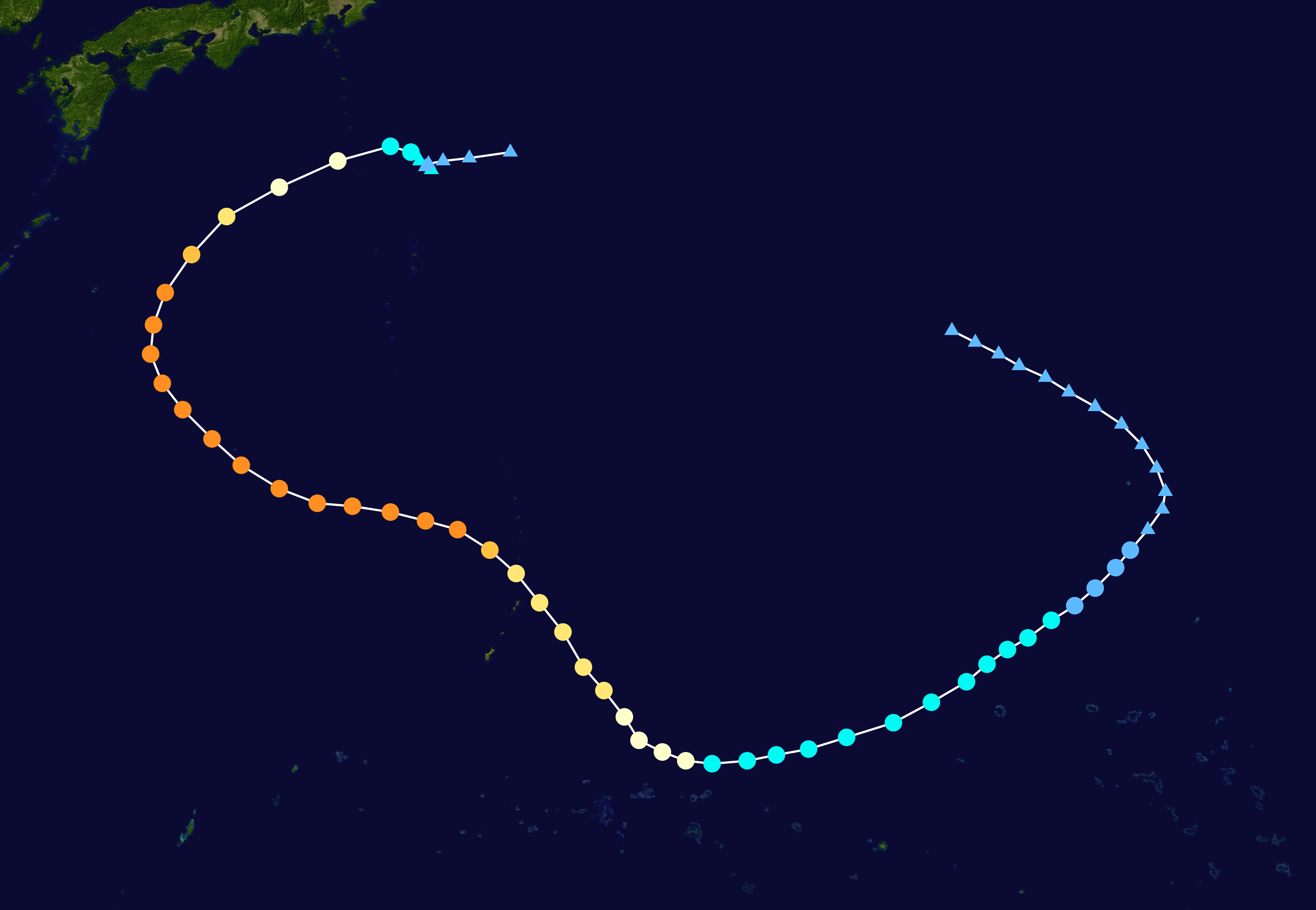
- Duration: October 26 – November 7
- Peak intensity: 195 km/h (120 mph) (10-min); 910 hPa (mbar)

The northeastern end of the monsoon trough developed into Tropical Depression 37W on October 25 over subtropical latitudes. It headed southeastward, then turned to the southwest, becoming a tropical storm on the 29th. Zelda continued its slow intensification rate, and as it turned more westward, it became a typhoon on the 1st. Continuing its clockwise movement, Zelda turned to the northwest, where it passed over the Northern Mariana Islands. On the 3rd the storm rapidly intensified to a 135 kn (250 km/h) super typhoon, and as it turned to the northeast it slowly weakened to a tropical storm on the 8th. On the 10th, Zelda dissipated, only 1,700 kilometres (1,100 mi) from its start after following a several thousand mile track.

=== Typhoon Axel (Garding) ===
- Very strong typhoon (JMA)
- Category 4 typhoon (SSHWS)
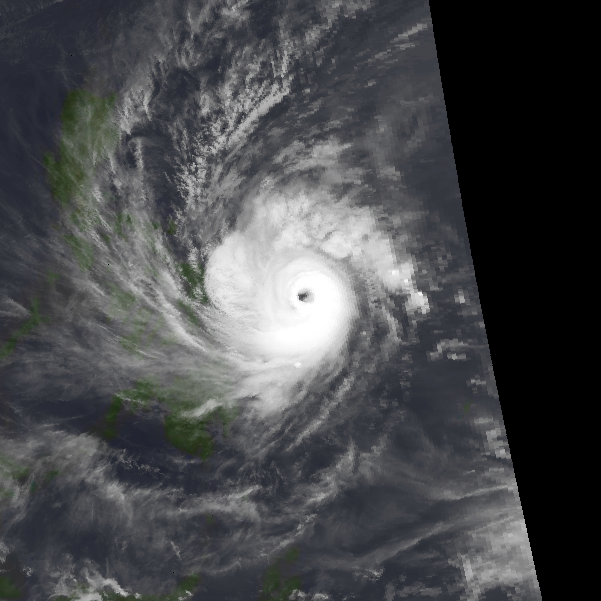
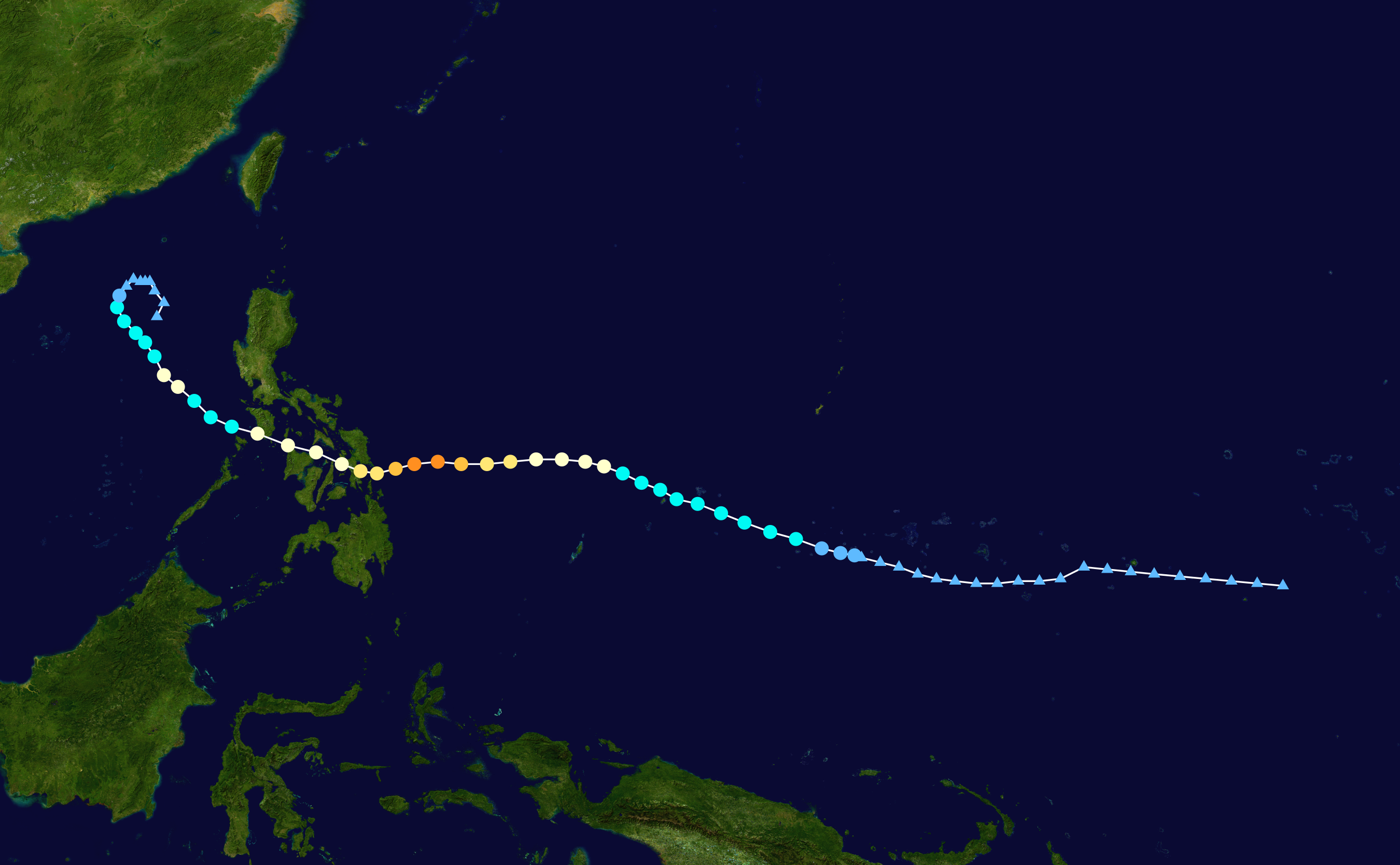
- Duration: December 14 – December 27
- Peak intensity: 155 km/h (100 mph) (10-min); 950 hPa (mbar)

Forming along a near-equatorial trough, a surface circulation formed on December 13 and began to move west-northwestward. The system organized into a tropical depression on December 14, but only for 12 hours as the system became much less organized and had more than one circulation center. On December 15, the system began to regenerate due to increasing thunderstorm activity near its main circulation center, and by late in the day, was once again considered a tropical depression. Modestly developing thereafter, the tropical cyclone intensified into a typhoon on December 19 as it turned due west.

Axel moved south of Samar in the Philippines, weakening as it moved through the archipelago. Nineteen perished as the typhoon moved through the country, with five deaths occurring in Bacolod City as heavy rains caused a dam break. High waves destroyed 163 homes on Mindanao. The storm also knocked out power lines and caused a massive blackout in the entire island of Luzon. Entering the South China Sea as a tropical storm, the system briefly reintensified into a typhoon before vertical wind shear substantially increased, which led to its significant weakening. The tropical cyclone dissipated 370 kilometres (230 mi) southeast of Hong Kong on December 26.

As Axel passed 30 nm (55 km) to the north of Yap, minor damage to vegetation was reported. At least 12 people died in the central Philippines. Flood waters breached a dam, drowning five people and injuring 25 in Bacolod City, 260 nm (480 km) southeast of Manila. In Tacloban City, seven people died and 17 were reported missing. On the island of Mindanao, huge waves generated by the approaching typhoon destroyed 163 houses, leaving 897 people homeless. In total 1,443 houses were destroyed, leaving at least 7,930 people homeless. A 12-hour power blackout affected Manila when strong winds knocked down a major transmission line on Luzon. Overall, the storm left 44 dead and caused ₱648 million (US$24.5 million) in damage.

=== Tropical Storm Bobbie ===
- Severe tropical storm (JMA)
- Tropical storm (SSHWS)
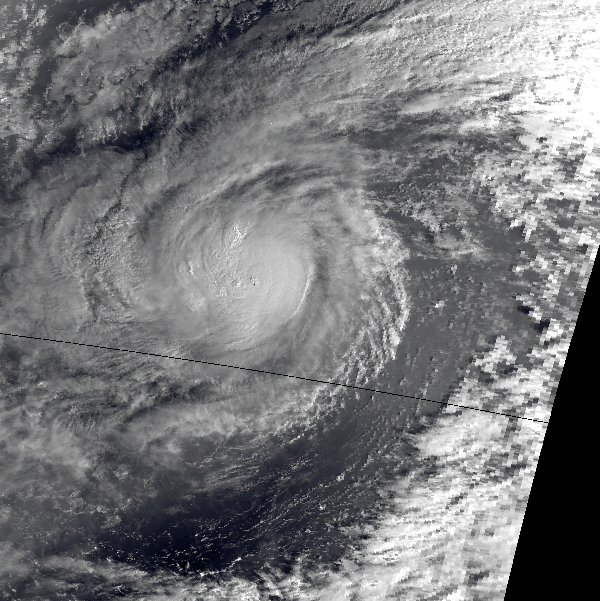
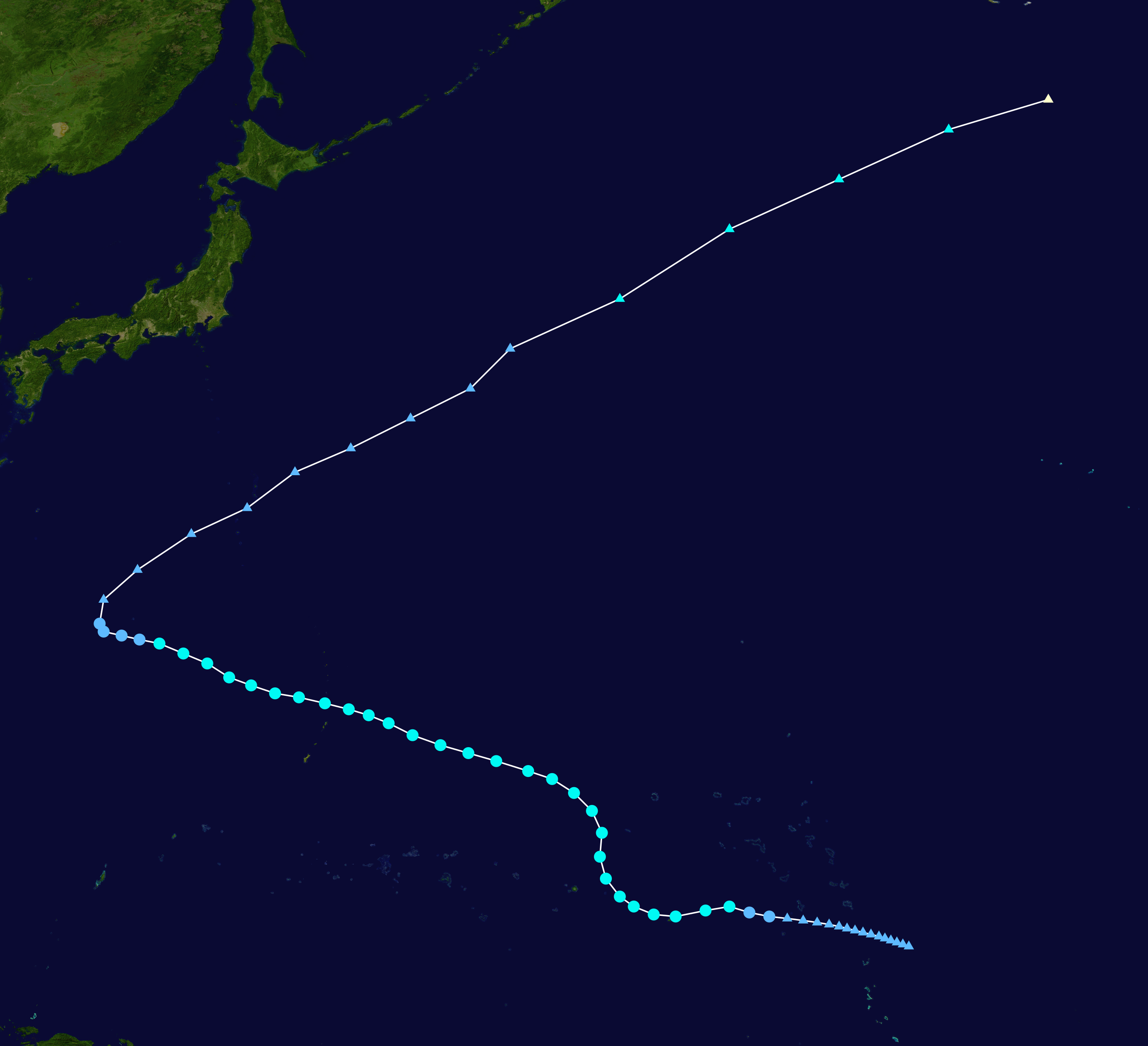
- Duration: December 18 – December 26
- Peak intensity: 95 km/h (60 mph) (10-min); 985 hPa (mbar)

Moving west-northwest, a tropical disturbance formed in the Marshall Islands on December 15. Due to vertical wind shear, the system was slow to organize. The system organized into a tropical depression on December 18, and intensified into a tropical storm on December 19. The system recurved weakened to a remnant low early on December 26.

=== Other systems ===
- Tropical Depression 13W formed on July 25 in association with a surge in the southwest monsoon, about 250 km (160 mi) east of Guam. It dissipated the next day, about 250 km (160 mi) north of Guam. On July 28, a subtropical cyclone was noted southeast of Tokyo, and it is possible that this was a continuation of Tropical Depression 13W.
- Tropical Depression Tering was classified by PAGASA on August 29, several hundred miles east of the Philippines. Tracking north of due west, it dissipated on August 30 before reaching the island archipelago.
- On September 26, an upper-tropospheric circulation separated from an upper-level trough that was situated northwest of Hawaii, and began moving westward towards the International Date Line. This tropical upper tropospheric trough also had deep convection associated with low-level cloud lines, which suggested that a low-level circulation possibly existed. It crossed the Dateline on September 27, with the convection persisting. The system continued to organise and became a tropical depression the next day, despite lacking in deep convection. It recurved eastward and weakened on October 3, and the final warning was issued.

== Storm names ==
During the season 34 named tropical cyclones developed in the Western Pacific and were named by the Joint Typhoon Warning Center, when it was determined that they had become tropical storms. These names were contributed to a revised list which started on mid-1989.

Owen	Page	Russ	Sharon	Tim	Vanessa	Walt	Yunya	Zeke	Amy	Brendan	Caitlin	Doug	Ellie	Fred	Gladys	Harry
Ivy	Joel	Kinna	Luke	Melissa	Nat	Orchid	Pat	Ruth	Seth	Teresa	Verne	Wilda	Yuri	Zelda	Axel	Bobbie

== Season effects ==
This table summarizes all the systems that developed within or moved into the North Pacific Ocean, to the west of the International Date Line during 1994. The tables also provide an overview of a systems intensity, duration, land areas affected and any deaths or damages associated with the system.

Name	Dates	Peak intensity			Areas affected	Damage (USD)	Deaths	Ref(s).
Name	Dates	Category	Wind speed	Pressure	Areas affected	Damage (USD)	Deaths	Ref(s).
01W (Akang)	January 4–5	Tropical depression	55 km/h (34 mph)	1,004 hPa (29.65 inHg)	Philippines	$2.4 million	45	
Owen (Bising)	March 31 – April 9	Severe tropical storm	110 km/h (68 mph)	980 hPa (28.94 inHg)	Caroline Islands, Philippines	Unknown	10	
Page (Klaring)	May 12–17	Typhoon	130 km/h (81 mph)	965 hPa (28.50 inHg)	Caroline Islands	None	None	
04W (Deling)	May 25–26	Tropical depression	55 km/h (34 mph)	1,004 hPa (29.65 inHg)	Philippines	None	5	
TD	May 27	Tropical depression	Not specified	1,004 hPa (29.65 inHg)	None	None	None	
Russ (Emang)	June 3–9	Severe tropical storm	95 km/h (59 mph)	985 hPa (29.09 inHg)	China	$728 million	74	
Sharon (Gading)	June 21–25	Tropical storm	75 km/h (47 mph)	996 hPa (29.41 inHg)	Philippines, South China	$5.27 billion	13	
Heling	June 25–29	Tropical depression	Not specified	1,002 hPa (29.59 inHg)	Philippines, Vietnam	None	None	
07W	July 3–6	Tropical depression	55 km/h (34 mph)	998 hPa (29.47 inHg)	South China	$114 million	10	
Tim (Iliang)	July 7–12	Very strong typhoon	175 km/h (109 mph)	930 hPa (27.46 inHg)	Philippines, Taiwan, China	$249 million	36	
Vanessa (Loleng)	July 9–11	Tropical storm	75 km/h (47 mph)	990 hPa (29.23 inHg)	Philippines	None	None	
Walt (Miding)	July 14–28	Very strong typhoon	185 km/h (115 mph)	915 hPa (27.02 inHg)	Philippines, Japan, South Korea	None	None	
Yunya (Norming)	July 17–21	Tropical storm	85 km/h (53 mph)	990 hPa (29.23 inHg)	Philippines	$37.6 million	11	
Zeke	July 17–24	Severe tropical storm	95 km/h (59 mph)	985 hPa (29.09 inHg)	None	None	None	
TD	July 18–23	Tropical depression	Not specified	1,000 hPa (29.53 inHg)	Vietnam, China	None	None	
TD	July 23–24	Tropical depression	Not specified	1,000 hPa (29.53 inHg)	None	None	None	
Amy	July 25–31	Tropical storm	85 km/h (53 mph)	985 hPa (29.09 inHg)	South China, Vietnam	$8 million	15	
13W	July 25–29	Tropical depression	55 km/h (34 mph)	996 hPa (29.41 inHg)	Mariana Islands	None	None	
TD	July 25–26	Tropical depression	Not specified	998 hPa (29.47 inHg)	None	None	None	
Brendan (Oyang)	July 25 – August 3	Tropical storm	85 km/h (53 mph)	992 hPa (29.29 inHg)	Philippines, Ryukyu Islands, Korean Peninsula	Unknown	2	
Caitlin (Pasing)	July 28 – August 6	Tropical storm	85 km/h (53 mph)	990 hPa (29.23 inHg)	Mariana Islands, Philippines, Taiwan, China	$643 million	18	
TD	July 29	Tropical depression	Not specified	1,004 hPa (29.65 inHg)	None	None	None	
Doug (Ritang)	August 1–13	Very strong typhoon	185 km/h (115 mph)	925 hPa (27.32 inHg)	Mariana Islands, Philippines, Taiwan, Ryukyu Islands, South Korea, East China	$110 million	26	
Ellie	August 6–16	Typhoon	150 km/h (93 mph)	965 hPa (28.50 inHg)	Japan, East China, Russia	$41.7 million	1	
Li	August 12–17	Tropical storm	85 km/h (53 mph)	992 hPa (29.29 inHg)	None	None	None	
Fred (Susang)	August 14–23	Very strong typhoon	185 km/h (115 mph)	925 hPa (27.32 inHg)	Japan, Taiwan, East China, Russia	$1.19 billion	3,063	
Gladys (Uding)	August 20 – September 4	Typhoon	150 km/h (93 mph)	955 hPa (28.20 inHg)	Taiwan, Ryukyu Islands, East China	$15.4 million	6	
Harry	August 23–29	Tropical storm	85 km/h (53 mph)	990 hPa (29.23 inHg)	Philippines, South China, Vietnam	$56.5 million	None	
Ivy	August 27 – September 4	Typhoon	140 km/h (87 mph)	960 hPa (28.35 inHg)	None	None	None	
John	August 28 – September 8	Typhoon	155 km/h (96 mph)	945 hPa (27.91 inHg)	Wake Island	None	None	
Tering	August 29–30	Tropical depression	35 km/h (22 mph)	1,006 hPa (29.71 inHg)	None	None	None	
TD	September 3	Tropical depression	Not specified	1,008 hPa (29.77 inHg)	None	None	None	
Joel	September 3–6	Tropical storm	85 km/h (53 mph)	990 hPa (29.23 inHg)	South China, Vietnam	None	None	
Kinna	September 3–12	Typhoon	140 km/h (87 mph)	960 hPa (28.35 inHg)	None	None	None	
Luke (Weling)	September 7–14	Tropical storm	85 km/h (53 mph)	990 hPa (29.23 inHg)	Philippines, South China, Vietnam	$11.7 million	None	
Melissa	September 11–19	Violent typhoon	205 km/h (127 mph)	910 hPa (26.87 inHg)	Marshall Islands, Japan	None	3	
TD	September 13–14	Tropical depression	Not specified	1,008 hPa (29.77 inHg)	None	None	None	
Nat	September 15–22	Tropical storm	75 km/h (47 mph)	992 hPa (29.29 inHg)	Mariana Islands	None	None	
Orchid (Aning)	September 17–30	Very strong typhoon	185 km/h (115 mph)	925 hPa (27.32 inHg)	Mariana Islands, Japan, Russia Far East	$1.25 million	9	
Pat	September 21–28	Typhoon	130 km/h (81 mph)	965 hPa (28.50 inHg)	None	None	None	
TD	September 23	Tropical depression	Not specified	1,008 hPa (29.77 inHg)	None	None	None	
Ruth	September 24–26	Tropical storm	75 km/h (47 mph)	996 hPa (29.41 inHg)	None	None	None	
31W	September 29 – October 6	Tropical depression	55 km/h (34 mph)	1,000 hPa (29.53 inHg)	None	None	None	
Seth (Bidang)	October 3–12	Violent typhoon	205 km/h (127 mph)	910 hPa (26.87 inHg)	Marshall Islands, Caroline Islands, Mariana Islands, Taiwan, Japan, Korean Peninsula	$2.3 million	9	
Teresa (Katring)	October 16–26	Typhoon	150 km/h (93 mph)	955 hPa (28.20 inHg)	Mariana Islands, Philippines, Vietnam, Cambodia	$16.4 million	16	
Verne (Delang)	October 16 – November 1	Typhoon	150 km/h (93 mph)	950 hPa (28.05 inHg)	None	None	None	
Wilda	October 19 – November 1	Very strong typhoon	165 km/h (103 mph)	935 hPa (27.61 inHg)	None	None	None	
Yuri	October 22–26	Tropical storm	75 km/h (47 mph)	996 hPa (29.41 inHg)	Wake Island	None	None	
Zelda (Esang)	October 26 – November 7	Violent typhoon	195 km/h (121 mph)	910 hPa (26.87 inHg)	Caroline Islands, Mariana Islands, Japan	None	None	
Axel (Garding)	December 16–27	Typhoon	155 km/h (96 mph)	950 hPa (28.05 inHg)	Caroline Islands, Philippines	$24.5 million	44	
Bobbie	December 18–26	Severe tropical storm	95 km/h (59 mph)	985 hPa (29.09 inHg)	Marshall Islands, Caroline Islands, Mariana Islands	None	None	
Season aggregates
52 systems	January 4 – December 27		205 km/h (127 mph)	910 hPa (26.87 inHg)		$8.54 billion	3,407	

== See also ==
- List of Pacific typhoon seasons
- 1994 Pacific hurricane season
- 1994 Atlantic hurricane season
- 1994 North Indian Ocean cyclone season
- South-West Indian Ocean cyclone season: 1993–94, 1994–95
- Australian region cyclone season: 1993–94, 1994–95
- South Pacific cyclone season: 1993–94, 1994–95
