= Tropical cyclones in 1994 =

Year boundaries
- First system: 01W (Akang)
- Formed: January 4, 1994
- Last system: Christelle
- Dissipated: January 11, 1995

Strongest system
- Name: Geralda
- Lowest pressure: 905 mbar (hPa); 26.72 inHg

Longest lasting system
- Name: John (Second longest-lasting tropical system on record)
- Duration: 31 days

Year statistics
- Total systems: 124
- Named systems: 91
- Total fatalities: 3,733 total
- Total damage: $11.2 billion (1994 USD)
Related articles
- 1994 Atlantic hurricane season
- 1994 Pacific hurricane season
- 1994 Pacific typhoon season
- 1994 North Indian Ocean cyclone season
- 1993–94 South-West Indian Ocean cyclone season
- 1994–95 South-West Indian Ocean cyclone season
- 1993–94 Australian region cyclone season
- 1994–95 Australian region cyclone season
- 1993–94 South Pacific cyclone season
- 1994–95 South Pacific cyclone season

In this image, Typhoon Zelda reached peak intensity on the center, while on the far left, dissipating remnants of BOB 03 is visible.

During 1994, tropical cyclones formed within seven different tropical cyclone basins, located within various parts of the Atlantic, Pacific and Indian Oceans. During the year, a total of 124 systems formed with 91 of these developing further and were named by the responsible warning centre. The strongest tropical cyclone of the year was Cyclone Geralda, which was estimated to have a minimum barometric pressure of 905 hPa (26.72 inHg). The deadliest tropical cyclone was Typhoon Fred, which caused 1,248 fatalities in China, while the costliest was Tropical Storm Sharon, which caused an estimated $5.27 billion USD in damage after striking Hong Kong, China and the Philippines. Five Category 5 tropical cyclones formed in 1994. The accumulated cyclone energy (ACE) index for 1994 (seven basins combined), as calculated by Colorado State University was 1019 units.

Tropical cyclone activity in each basin is under the authority of an RSMC. The National Hurricane Center (NHC) is responsible for tropical cyclones in the North Atlantic and East Pacific. The Central Pacific Hurricane Center (CPHC) is responsible for tropical cyclones in the Central Pacific. Both the NHC and CPHC are subdivisions of the National Weather Service. Activity in the West Pacific is monitored by the Japan Meteorological Agency (JMA). Systems in the North Indian Ocean are monitored by the India Meteorological Department (IMD). The Météo-France located in Réunion (MFR) monitors tropical activity in the South-West Indian Ocean. The Australian region is monitored by five TCWCs that are under the coordination of the Australian Bureau of Meteorology (BOM). Similarly, the South Pacific is monitored by both the Fiji Meteorological Service (FMS) and the Meteorological Service of New Zealand Limited. Other, unofficial agencies that provide additional guidance in tropical cyclone monitoring include the Philippine Atmospheric, Geophysical and Astronomical Services Administration (PAGASA) and the Joint Typhoon Warning Center (JTWC).

== Global conditions and hydrological summary ==
El Nino developed during spring and lasted until near autumn.

== Systems ==
=== January ===
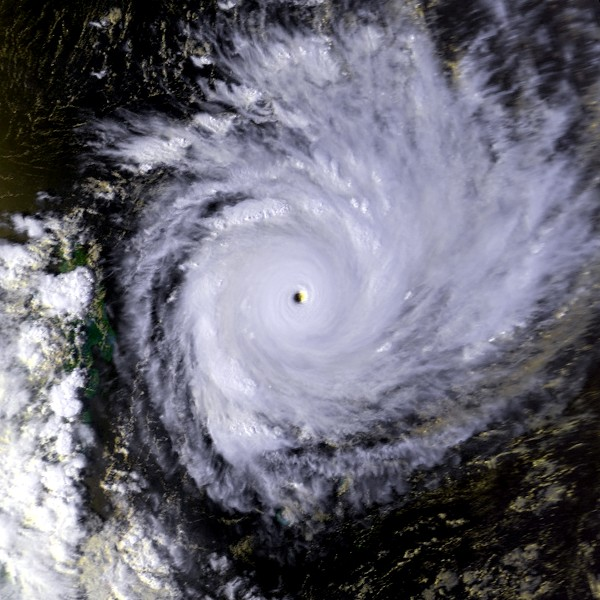
Cyclone Geralda

Tropical cyclones formed in January 1994
Storm name	Dates active	Max wind km/h (mph)	Pressure (hPa)	Areas affected	Damage (USD)	Deaths	Refs
01W (Akang)	January 4–5	55 (35)	1004	Philippines	$2.4 million	45	
07P	January 6–8	55 (35)	1002	Solomon Islands	None	None	
Daisy	January 7–16	155 (100)	935	St. Brandon, Madagascar	Unknown	Unknown	
Pearl-Farah	January 10–21	155 (100)	960	Western Australia	None	None	
Edmea	January 13–19	95 (60)	976	None	None	None	
Sarah	January 22 – February 4	165 (105)	945	Vanuatu, New Caledonia	Unknown	Unknown	
Quenton	January 22–29	150 (90)	955	None	None	None	
Geralda	January 26 – February 8	205 (125)	905	Madagascar	>$10 million	231	
Sadie	January 29–31	85 (50)	985	Northern Territory, Queensland	None	None	

=== February ===
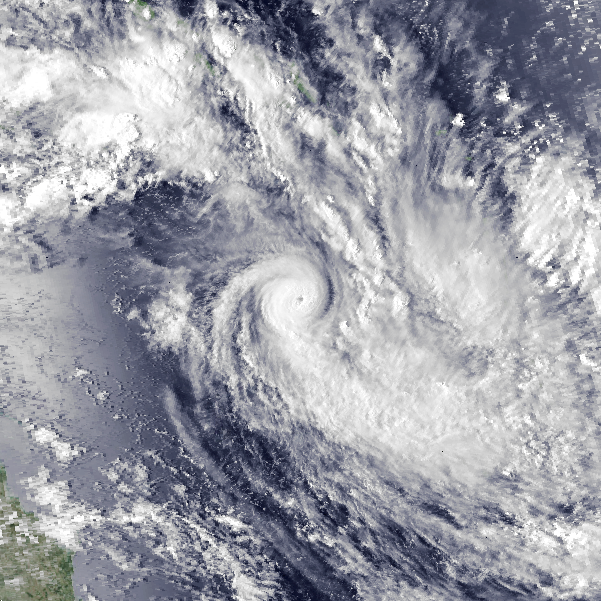
Cyclone Theodore

February was an extremely inactive month, featuring only 4 systems, of which all were named. Hollanda was the first storm of the month, peaking as a Category-3 equivalent cyclone and causing strong wind gusts and heavy rainfall on the Mascarene Islands and causing 2 deaths. Ivy and Julita formed afterwards, with Ivy peaking as a Category-3 equivalent cyclone and Julita making landfall on Madagascar. Cyclone Theodore was the last and strongest storm of the month, crossing over into the South Pacific basin and peaking as a Category-4 equivalent cyclone.

Tropical cyclones formed in February 1994
Storm name	Dates active	Max wind km/h (mph)	Pressure (hPa)	Areas affected	Damage (USD)	Deaths	Refs
Hollanda	February 6–14	155 (100)	940	Mauritius, Réunion	$135 million	2	
Ivy	February 8–20	140 (85)	950	Rodrigues	Minimal	None	
Julita	February 15–18	55 (35)	995	Madagascar	Minimal	None	
Theodore	February 22 – March 3	215 (130)	910	Papua New Guinea, Solomon Islands, New Caledonia	Unknown	1	

=== March ===
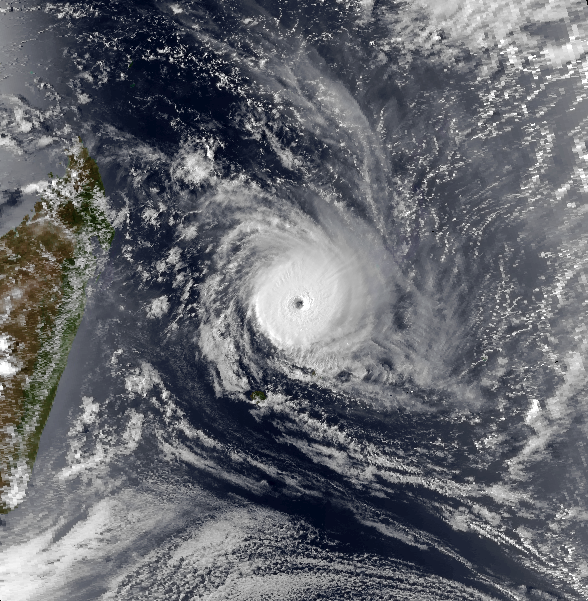
Cyclone Litanne

Tropical cyclones formed in March 1994
Storm name	Dates active	Max wind km/h (mph)	Pressure (hPa)	Areas affected	Damage (USD)	Deaths	Refs
Kelvina	March 5–11	85 (50)	985	Madagascar, Mascarene Islands	Unknown	0	
Litanne	March 7–19	195 (120)	910	Madagascar, Mascarene Islands	Unknown	0	
Mariola	March 10–19	115 (70)	966	None	Unknown	0	
Sharon	March 12–22	195 (120)	930	Western Australia	None	None	
Tomas	March 19–27	155 (100)	955	Vanuatu, Fiji	Unknown	None	
Nadia	March 16 – April 1	175 (110)	925	Madagascar, Mozambique, Malawi	$20.2 million	252	
BOB 01	March 21–24	45 (30)	Not specified	None	None	None	
Usha	March 24 – April 4	95 (60)	980	Solomon Islands, Vanuatu, New Caledonia	Unknown	None	
Tim	March 28 – April 3	65 (40)	995	None	None	None	
Odille	March 30 – April 14	175 (110)	925	Mascarene Islands	Unknown	0	
Owen (Bising)	March 31 – April 9	110 (70)	980	Caroline Islands, Philippines	Unknown	10	

=== April ===
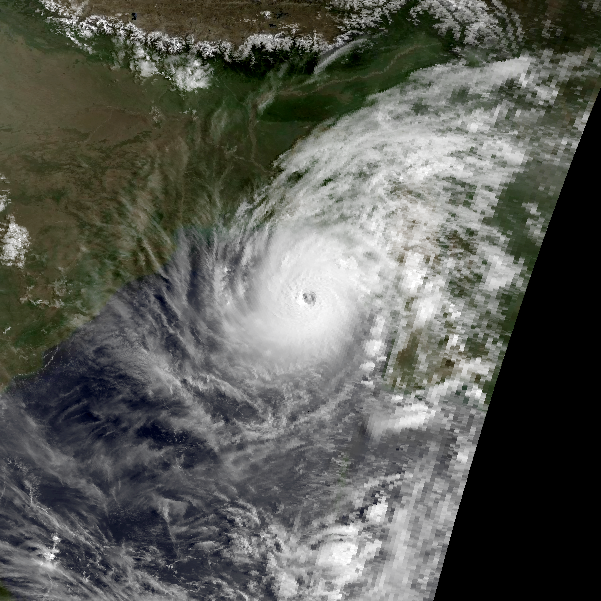
BOB 02

Tropical cyclones formed in April 1994
Storm name	Dates active	Max wind km/h (mph)	Pressure (hPa)	Areas affected	Damage (USD)	Deaths	Refs
Vivienne	April 5–13	150 (90)	955	None	None	None	
29P	April 24–25	55 (35)	1000	Solomon Islands	None	None	
Willy	April 26 – May 1	95 (60)	985	Cocos Islands	None	None	
BOB 02	April 26 – May 3	215 (130)	940	Bangladesh, Northeast India, Myanmar	$125 million	350	

=== May ===
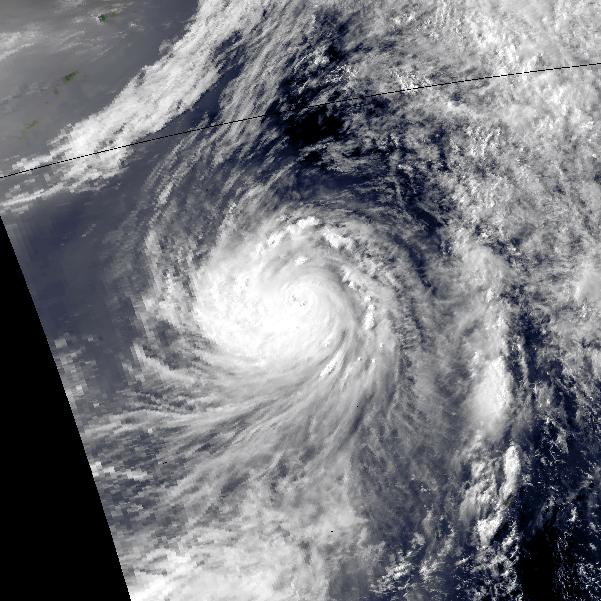
Typhoon Page

May was the least active month of 1994, featuring only 3 systems, of which only 1 was named. Typhoon Page, the first and strongest storm of the month, formed on May 12 and stayed out to sea, peaking as a Category-2 equivalent cyclone. Deling formed on May 25, causing 5 deaths in the Philippines. A tropical depression was the last storm of the month.

Tropical cyclones formed in May 1994
Storm name	Dates active	Max wind km/h (mph)	Pressure (hPa)	Areas affected	Damage (USD)	Deaths	Refs
Page (Klaring)	May 12–17	130 (80)	965	Caroline Islands	None	None	
04W (Deling)	May 25–26	55 (35)	1004	Philippines	None	5	
TD	May 27	Not specified	1004	None	None	None	

=== June ===
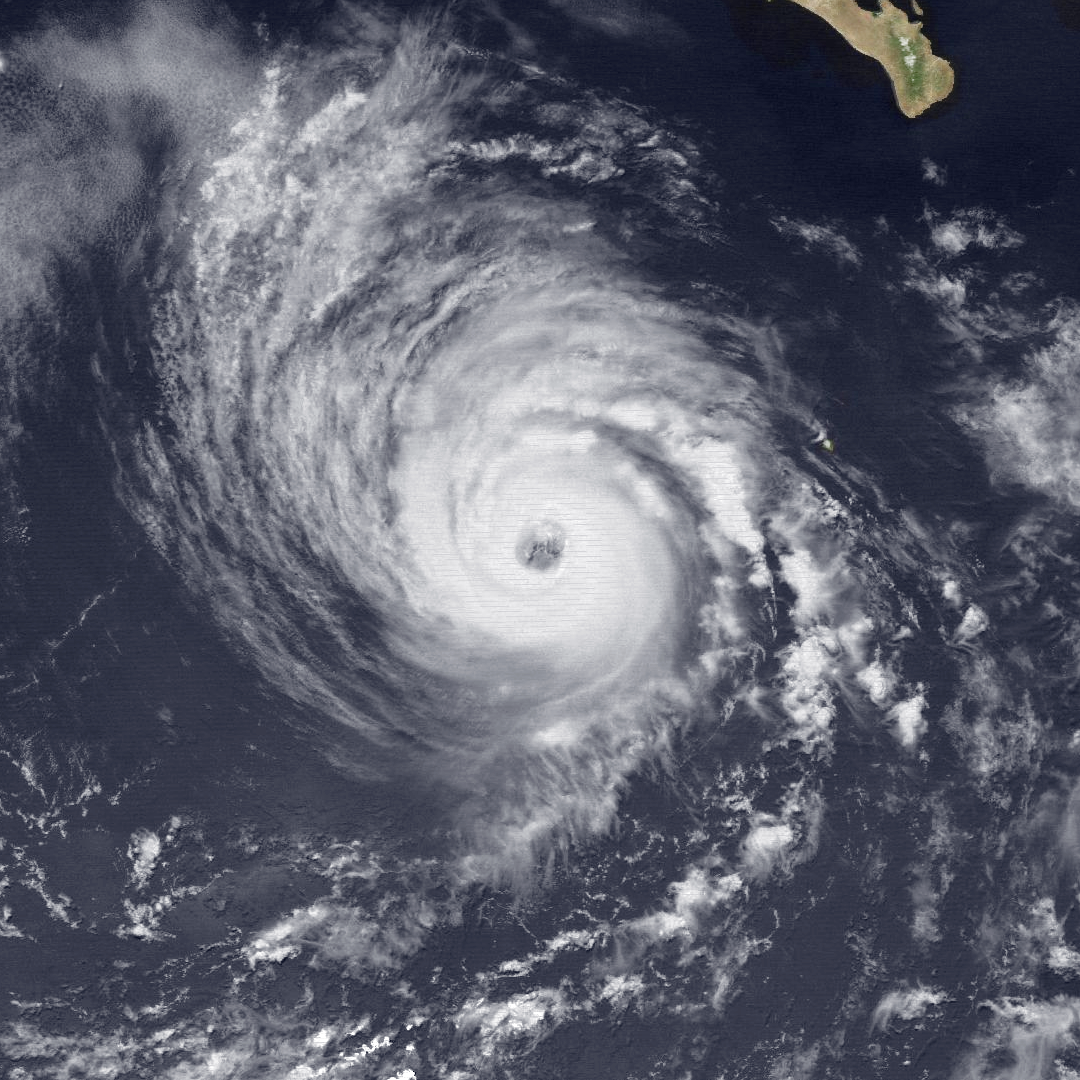
Hurricane Carlotta

Tropical cyclones formed in June 1994
Storm name	Dates active	Max wind km/h (mph)	Pressure (hPa)	Areas affected	Damage (USD)	Deaths	Refs
Russ (Emang)	June 3–9	95 (60)	985	China	$728 million	74	
ARB 01	June 5–9	100 (65)	980	Western India, Oman	None	None	
Aletta	June 18–23	85 (50)	999	None	None	None	
Sharon (Gading)	June 21–25	75 (45)	996	Philippines, South China	$5.27 billion	13	
Heling	June 25–29	Not specified	1002	Philippines, Vietnam	None	None	
Bud	June 27–29	75 (45)	1003	None	None	None	
Carlotta	June 23 – July 5	165 (105)	967	Socorro Island, Revillagigedo Islands	None	None	
Alberto	June 30 – July 7	100 (65)	993	Florida Panhandle, Alabama, Georgia	$1.03 billion	32	

=== November ===
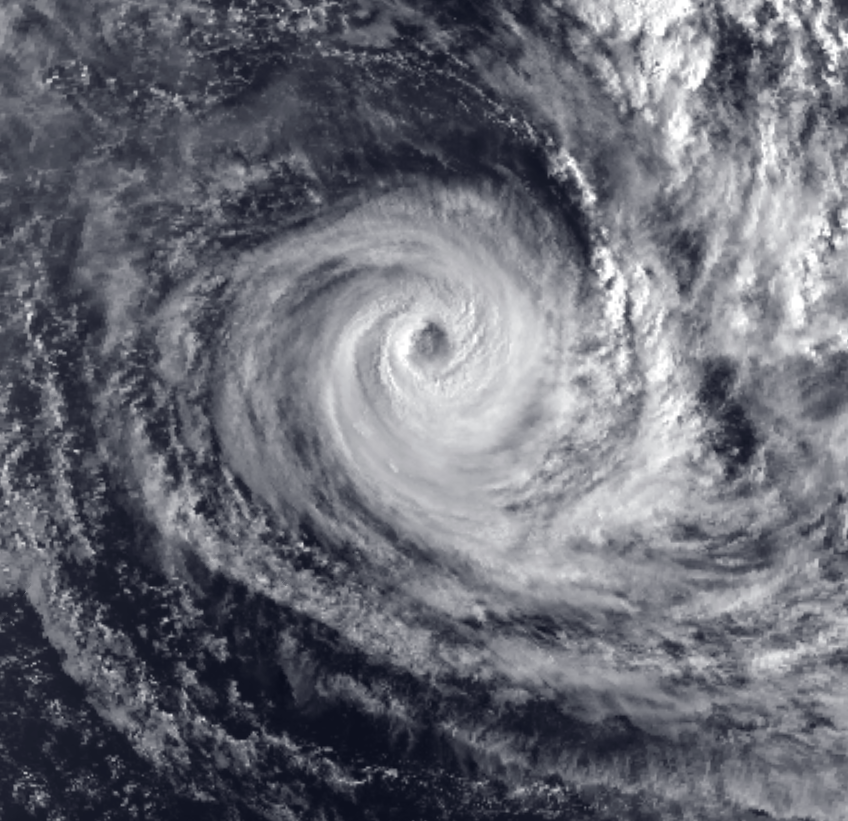
Cyclone Albertine

Tropical cyclones formed in November 1994
Storm name	Dates active	Max wind km/h (mph)	Pressure (hPa)	Areas affected	Damage (USD)	Deaths	Refs
Florence	November 2–8	175 (110)	972	None	None	None	
Depression	November –	45 (30)	Not specified	Southern India	None	None	
Gordon	November 8–21	140 (85)	980	Central America, Cayman Islands, Jamaica, Hispaniola, Cuba, Turks and Caicos Islands, Bahamas, Florida, Georgia, Mid-Atlantic states	$594 million	1152	
Vania	November 10–19	100 (65)	980	Vanuatu	Minimal	None	
ARB 02	November 15–20	120 (75)	984	Somalia	Unknown	30	
Albertine	November 23 – December 3	175 (110)	925	Mascarene Islands	Unknown	None	

=== December ===
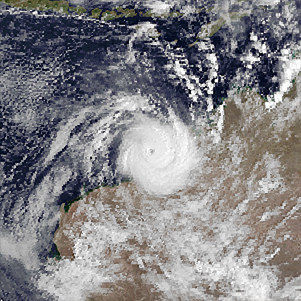
Cyclone Annette

Tropical cyclones formed in December 1994
Storm name	Dates active	Max wind km/h (mph)	Pressure (hPa)	Areas affected	Damage (USD)	Deaths	Refs
Annette	December 12–20	185 (115)	925	Western Australia	Minor	None	
04P	December 13–17	65 (40)	997	Fiji, Tonga	Unknown	Unknown	
Axel (Garding)	December 14–27	155 (100)	950	Caroline Islands, Philippines	None	19	
Bobbie	December 18–26	95 (60)	985	Marshall Islands, Caroline Islands, Mariana Islands	None	None	
Christelle	December 27 – January 11	85 (50)	980	Madagascar, Mascarene Islands	Unknown	None	
William	December 30 – January 3	110 (70)	975	Cook Islands, French Polynesia	$2.5 million	None	

== Global effects ==
Season name	Areas affected	Systems formed	Named storms	Damage (USD)	Deaths
1994 Atlantic hurricane season ^{5}	Southeastern United States, Mid-Atlantic states, New England, Bermuda, Lesser Antilles, Central America, Cayman Islands, Jamaica, Hispaniola, Cuba, Turks and Caicos Islands, The Bahamas, Southern United States, Mid-Atlantic states	12	7	~ $1.93 billion	1,189
1994 Pacific hurricane season ^{5}	Socorro Island, Revillagigedo Islands, Hawaiian Islands, Johnston Atoll, Aleutian Islands, Alaska, Baja California Peninsula, Southwestern Mexico, Western Mexico, Southwestern United States	22	20	$720 million	4
1994 Pacific typhoon season	Philippines, Caroline Islands, South China, Vietnam, Taiwan, Japan, South Korea, Mariana Islands, Ryukyu Islands, Korean Peninsula, East China, Russian Far East, Wake Island, Marshall Islands	50	34	$8.14 billion	1,301
1994 North Indian Ocean cyclone season ^{4}	Bangladesh, Northeast India, Myanmar, Western India, Oman, Pakistan, Somalia	8	4	>$240 million	722
1993–94 South-West Indian Ocean cyclone season ^{2} ^{6}	Mauritius, Reunion, St. Brandon, Madagascar, Comoros, Mayotte, Mozambique, Malawi	11	10	>$165 million	495
1994–95 South-West Indian Ocean cyclone season ^{3} ^{6}	Mauritius, Réunion, Rodrigues	3	2	Unknown	Unknown
1993–94 Australian region cyclone season ^{2}	Western Australia, Northern Territory, Queensland, Papua New Guinea, Solomon Islands, New Caledonia, Cocos (Keeling) Islands	9	8	Unknown	22
1994–95 Australian region cyclone season ^{3}	Western Australia	1	1	Minor	None
1993–94 South Pacific cyclone season ^{2}	Solomon Islands, Fiji	5	3	None	None
1994–95 South Pacific cyclone season ^{3}	Vanuatu, Fiji, Tonga, Cook Islands, French Polynesia	3	2	$2.5 million	None
Worldwide	(See above)	124 (Note: The sum of the number of systems and fatalities in each basin will not equal the number shown as the total. This is because when systems move between basins, it creates a discrepancy in the actual number of systems and fatalities.)	91	> $11.2 billion	3,733

== Notes ==
^{2} Only systems that formed either on or after January 1, 1994 are counted in the seasonal totals.
^{3} Only systems that formed either before or on December 31, 1994 are counted in the seasonal totals.
^{4} The wind speeds for this tropical cyclone/basin are based on the IMD Scale which uses 3-minute sustained winds.
^{5} The wind speeds for this tropical cyclone/basin are based on the Saffir Simpson Scale which uses 1-minute sustained winds.
^{6} The wind speeds for this tropical cyclone/basin are based on Météo-France which uses wind gusts.
