= 1994 North Indian Ocean cyclone season =

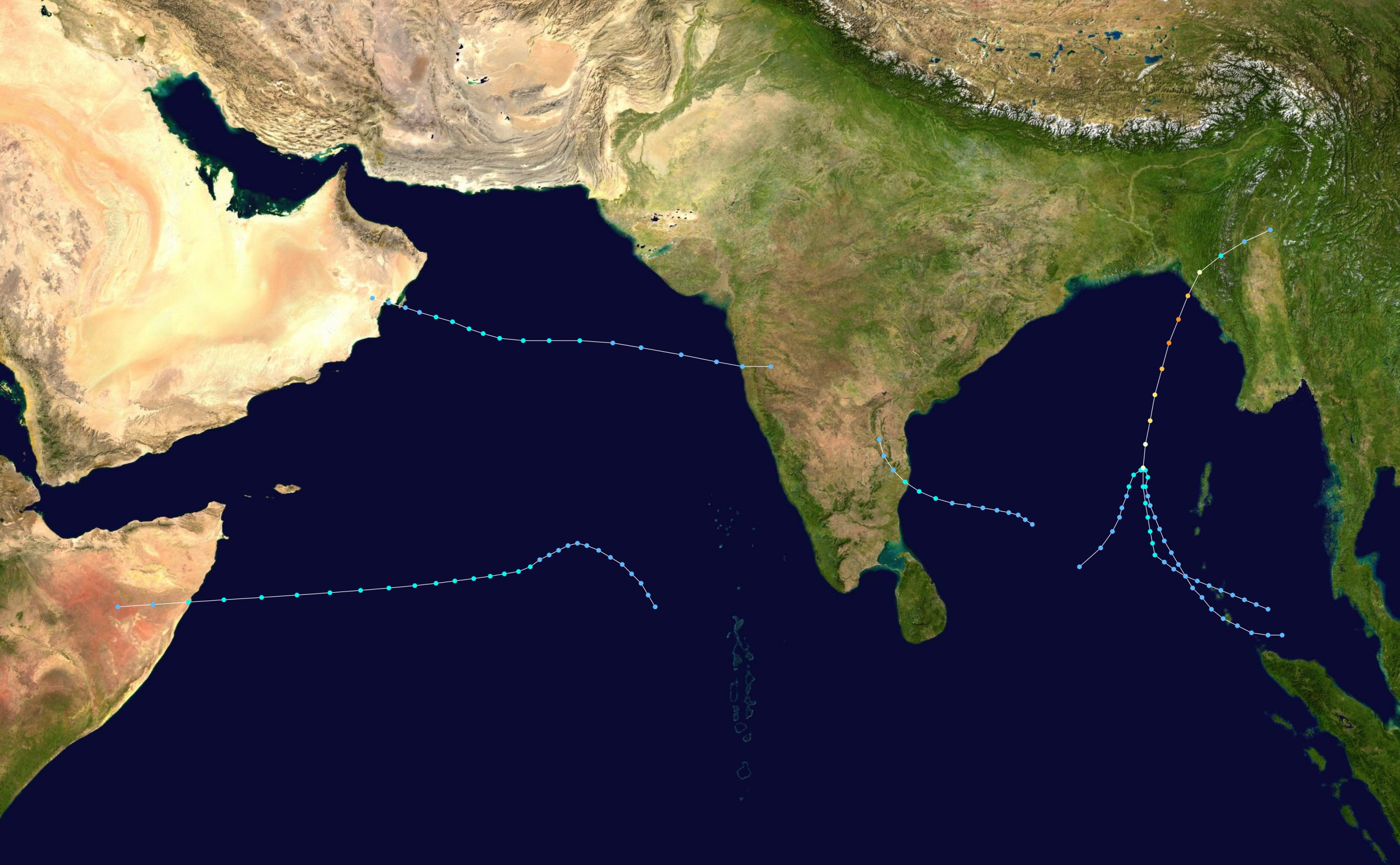
- Season summary map

Seasonal boundaries
- First system formed: March 21, 1994
- Last system dissipated: November 20, 1994

Strongest storm
- Name: BOB 02
  - Maximum winds: 215 km/h (130 mph) (3-minute sustained)
  - Lowest pressure: 940 hPa (mbar)

Seasonal statistics
- Depressions: 8
- Deep depressions: 6
- Cyclonic storms: 4
- Severe cyclonic storms: 4
- Very severe cyclonic storms: 2
- Extremely severe cyclonic storms: 1
- Super cyclonic storms: 0
- Total fatalities: 418
- Total damage: $240 million (1994 USD)

Related articles
- 1994 Atlantic hurricane season; 1994 Pacific hurricane season; 1994 Pacific typhoon season

The 1994 North Indian Ocean cyclone season was a below-average year in which eight tropical cyclones affected seven countries bordering the North Indian Ocean. The India Meteorological Department tracks all tropical cyclones in the basin, north of the equator. The first system developed on March 21 in the Bay of Bengal, the first March storm in the basin since 1938. The second storm was the most powerful cyclone of the season, attaining maximum sustained winds of 215 km/h (135 mph) in the northern Bay of Bengal. Making landfall near the border of Bangladesh and Myanmar, the cyclone killed 350 people and left US$125 million in damage.

A storm in June originated over western India and crossed the northern Arabian Sea, later striking Oman. In August, a deep depression moved across much of India into Pakistan. Another deep depression in October killed 38 people in southeastern India. In late October, a storm crossed over Chennai in southern India, leaving US$115 million in damage and 304 deaths. There was a short-lived depression in November that struck southeastern India. The last storm of the season moved across the Arabian Sea and struck northeastern Somalia, resulting in the death of 30 people.

== Season summary ==
During 1994, the India Meteorological Department (IMD) tracked 8 depressions, less than the average of 15. This included six systems in the Bay of Bengal and two systems over the Arabian Sea. The first system formed on March 21, becoming the first March depression in the Bay of Bengal since 1938. Of the eight depressions, six intensified into a deep depression, which has maximum sustained winds of 50–61 km/h (32–38 mph). Four deep depressions strengthened further into a cyclonic storm, which has sustained winds of at least 65 km/h (40 mph). Two storms during the season became a very severe cyclonic storm, which is the equivalent of hurricane status, with winds of at least 120 km/h (75 mph). During the season, the American-based Joint Typhoon Warning Center (JTWC) issued warnings for five of the tropical cyclones, which is the same as the long term average.

== Systems ==
=== Extremely Severe Cyclonic Storm BOB 02 ===
- Extremely severe cyclonic storm (IMD)
- Category 4 tropical cyclone (SSHWS)
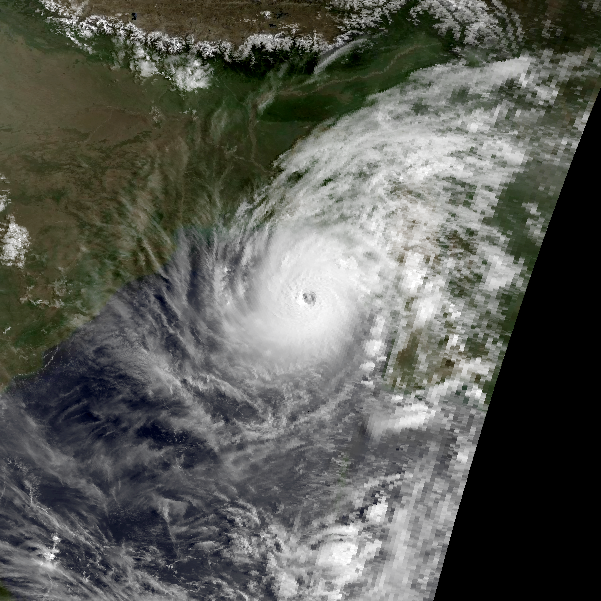
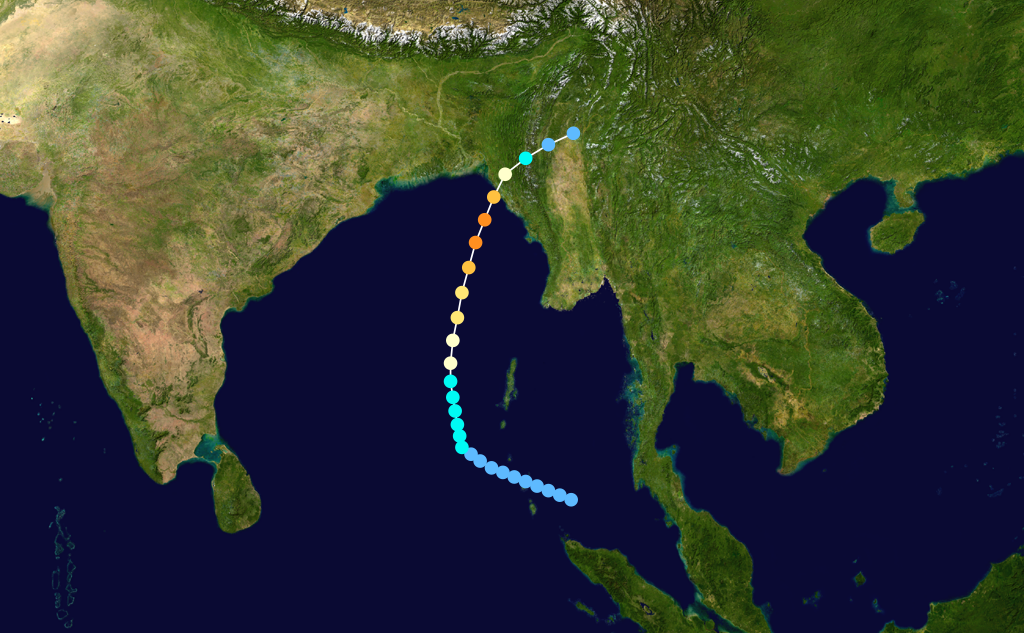
- Duration: April 26 – May 3
- Peak intensity: 215 km/h (130 mph) (3-min); 940 hPa (mbar)

A depression formed in the Bay of Bengal on April 29. It quickly organized over the next few days, as the storm moved around a ridge to its northeast. On May 1, the IMD upgraded the storm to a very severe cyclonic storm, by which time a well-defined eye was centered in the deepest convection, or thunderstorms. A day later, the cyclone reached peak winds of 215 km/h (135 mph), according to the IMD, and 230 km/h (145 mph) according to the JTWC. At around 17:00 UTC on May 2, the cyclone made landfall in southeastern Bangladesh about 30 km (18 mi) north of Teknaf Upazila. The storm rapidly weakened over land while continuing northeastward into Myanmar. Both the IMD and the JTWC discontinued advisories on May 3.

The storm closely followed the path, intensity, and time of year of a deadly cyclone in 1991 that killed 138,000 people. Ahead of the 1994 storm, about 450,000 people evacuated. In Bangladesh and neighboring Myanmar, the cyclone killed 285 people and caused about $125 million in damage. Damage was heaviest where the storm moved ashore, where almost every house was damage or destroyed, and 95% of trees were knocked down, blocking roads. The cyclone ultimately damaged or destroyed 69,973 homes in Bangladesh, leaving about 500,000 people homeless, including nearly 100,000 Rohingya refugees. The storm struck near low tide, which limited the storm surge flooding that proved deadly three years prior.

=== Severe Cyclonic Storm ARB 01 ===
- Severe cyclonic storm (IMD)
- Tropical storm (SSHWS)
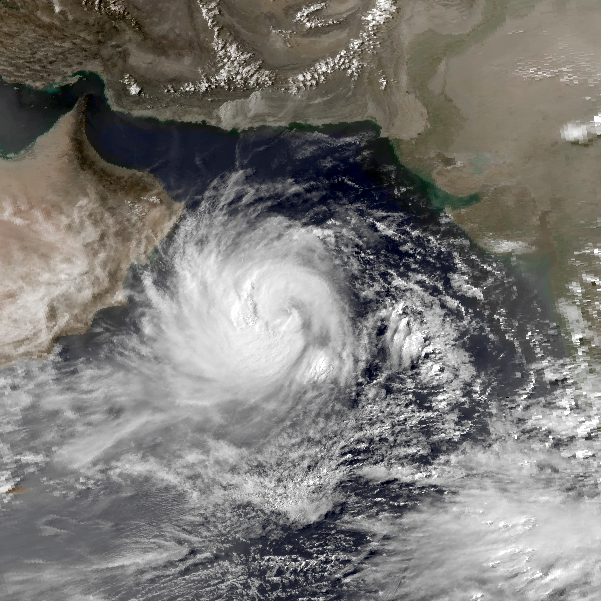
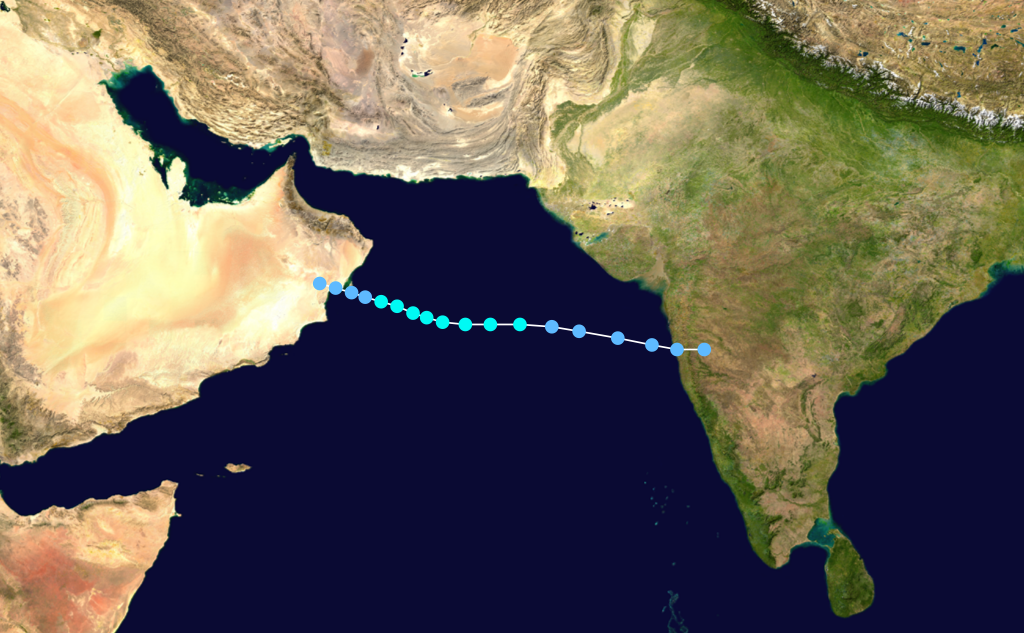
- Duration: June 5 – June 9
- Peak intensity: 100 km/h (65 mph) (3-min); 980 hPa (mbar)

After the annual monsoon moved across India, a thermal low developed in early June over Maharashtra in west-central India. Steered by the flow of the monsoon, the low moved offshore and tracked generally west-northwestward, bringing heavy rainfall and gusty winds to the coast. Ratnagiri, Maharashtra reported sustained winds of 74 km/h (46 mph). The IMD classified the low as a depression late on June 5, and upgraded it further to a cyclonic storm the next day. On June 7, the JTWC initiated advisories on the system, designating it Tropical Cyclone 03A and estimating peak winds of 85 km/h (55 mph). On the same day, the IMD upgraded the system to a severe cyclonic storm, estimating peak winds of 100 km/h (60 mph). The storm weakened as it continued across the northern Arabian Sea. By June 9, the storm had weakened to a depression, and that day it passed near Masirah Island before moving over eastern Oman. The circulation dissipated soon after, but the remnants of the storm continued westward into Yemen. Along the Arabian Peninsula, the cyclone produced dust storms but little rainfall.

=== Severe Cyclonic Storm BOB 03 ===
- Severe cyclonic storm (IMD)
- Tropical storm (SSHWS)
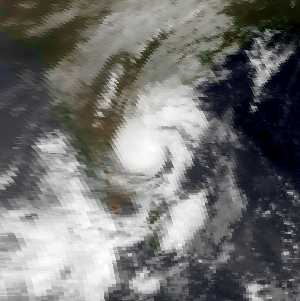
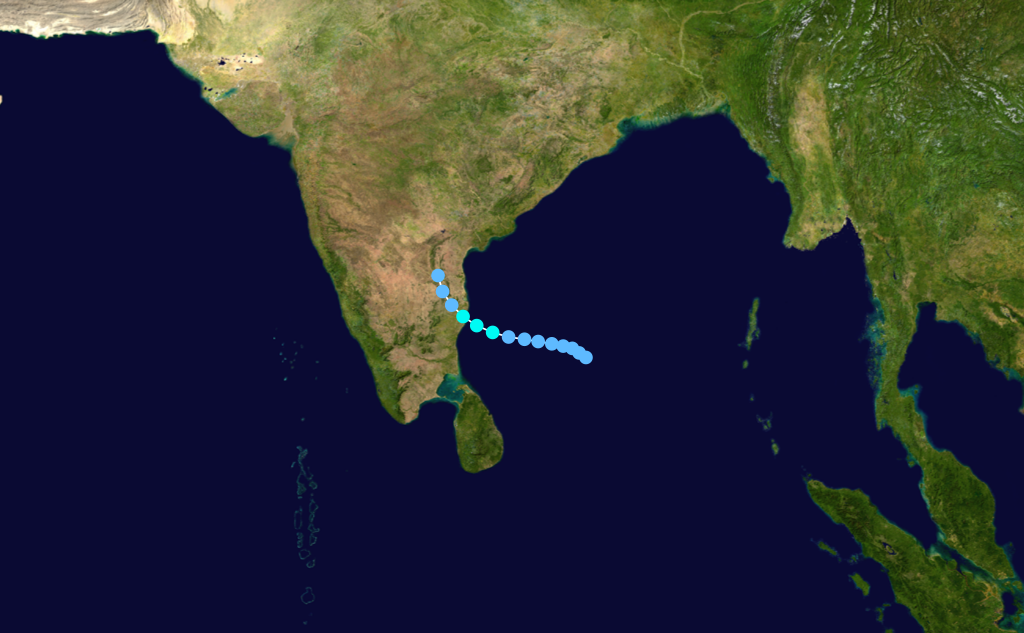
- Duration: October 29 – October 31
- Peak intensity: 110 km/h (70 mph) (3-min); 988 hPa (mbar)

A low-pressure area formed over the western Bay of Bengal on October 28. On the next day, the IMD classified it as a depression, and soon upgraded it to a deep depression. On October 30, the IMD upgraded it further to a cyclonic storm and later a severe cyclonic storm, estimating peak 3–minute winds of 110 km/h (70 mph); this was based on the appearance of a well-defined eye. Also on October 30, the JTWC initiated advisories on the system as Tropical Cyclone 04B north of Sri Lanka. The storm consisted of a consolidating area of thunderstorms, with spiral rainbands. Steered by a ridge to the north, the system moved west-northwestward toward the southeast coast of India. Early on October 31, the storm made landfall in southeastern India near Chennai with winds of 110 km/h (70 mph), according to the IMD, and 85 km/h (55 mph) according to the JTWC. Late on October 31, the storm fell below depression status after weakening over land.

Ahead of the storm, local officials coordinated the storm preparations, and about 93,000 people evacuated from low-lying areas. The storm moved ashore with a storm surge of 1 to 2 m (3.3 to 6.6 ft), inundating coastal areas 5 km (3.1 mi) inland. In Chennai where the storm moved ashore, the eye crossed over the city, causing a period of calm; before the calm, wind gusts reached 132 km/h (82 mph), and sustained winds reached 80 km/h (50 mph). In Chennai, the storm wrecked about 33,000 huts and 12 bridges. Across southeastern India, the storm dropped heavy rainfall, with a peak 24 hour total of 360 mm (14 in) recorded at Gudluru, Andhra Pradesh. About 52,000 houses in Andhra Pradesh were damaged. The combination of winds and rains damaged crops and roads while knocking down hundreds of trees. Train service and communications were disrupted. In Andhra Pradesh and Tamil Nadu, the storm killed 304 people, and left about ₹3.1 billion (US$115 million) in damage. After the storm, state and local governments provided food and medicine.

=== Very Severe Cyclonic Storm ARB 02 ===
- Very severe cyclonic storm (IMD)
- Tropical storm (SSHWS)
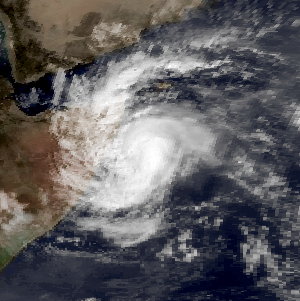
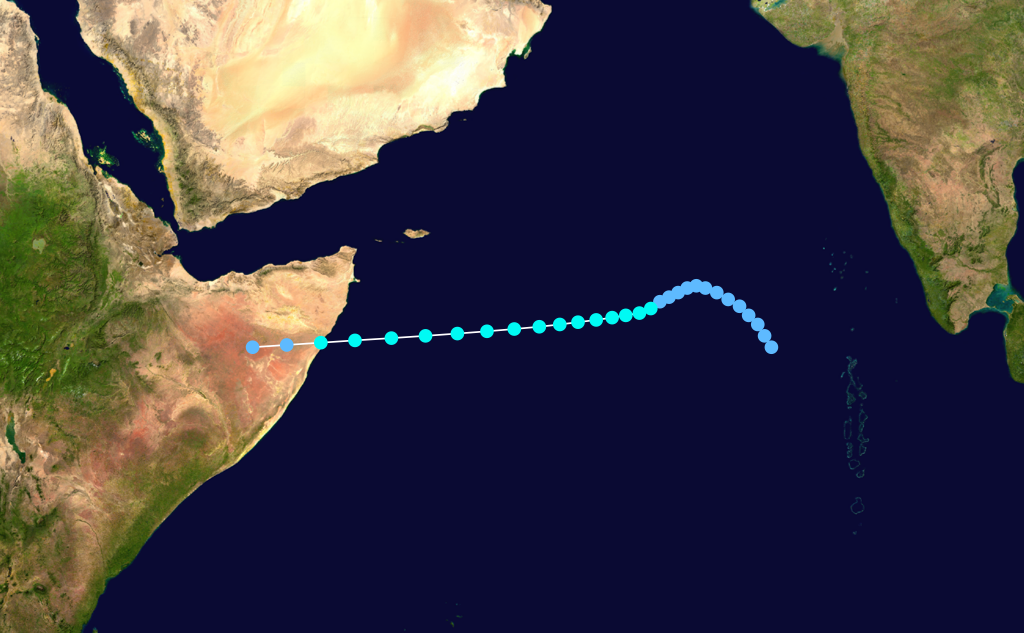
- Duration: November 15 – November 20
- Peak intensity: 120 km/h (75 mph) (3-min); 984 hPa (mbar)

The JTWC began monitoring an area of thunderstorms on November 13 in the south-central Arabian Sea. A day later, the system organized into a low-pressure area, before developing into a depression on November 15, as classified by the IMD. On the same day, the JTWC classified the system as Tropical Cyclone 05A. The system moved slowly at first before beginning a general westward motion, steered by a ridge to the north. Convection organized around the center, signaling intensification. On November 16, the IMD upgraded the depression to a deep depression, and later cyclonic storm. The storm fluctuated in intensity until November 18, when a more pronounced strengthening trend began. A day later, the IMD upgraded the storm to a very severe cyclonic storm, estimating 3 minute winds of 120 km/h (75 mph), based on a Dvorak rating of 4.0. The JTWC meanwhile estimated peak 1 minute winds of 110 km/h (70 mph). The storm weakened significantly as it approached the Horn of Africa. On November 20, the storm made landfall in eastern Somalia near Eyl. The storm rapidly dissipated over land.

The storm's track into the Horn of Africa was unusual, bringing heavy rainfall to the region that swept away boats and homes. Bosaso in northern Somalia reported winds of 104 km/h (65 mph). The storm killed 30 people in Somalia.

=== Other storms ===
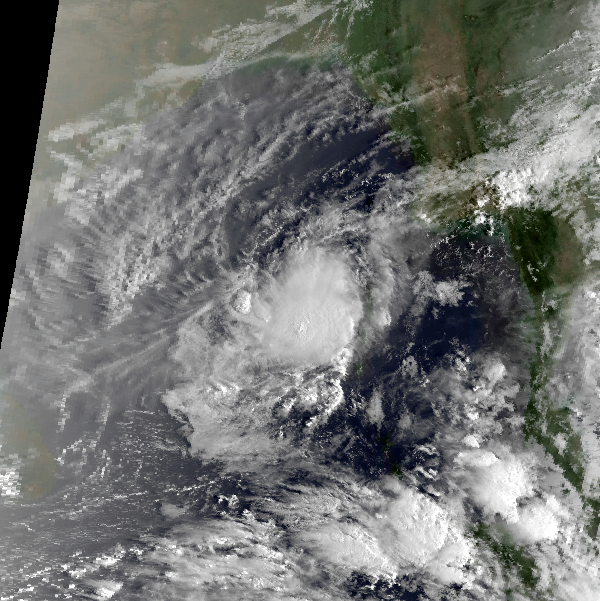
Satellite image of the March depression

On March 20, a weak circulation was located northwest of Sumatra, associated with a persistent area thunderstorms. Fueled by inflow from the southern hemisphere, the system organized as it moved northwestward through the Andaman Islands. On March 21, the IMD classified the system as a depression, the first to occur in the Bay of Bengal in March since 1938, and one of only four on record during the month. On the next day, the JTWC initiated advisories, classifying the depression as Tropical Cyclone 01B. On March 23, the JTWC estimated peak 1 minute winds of 75 km/h (45 mph). The IMD estimated that the system never intensified beyond 3 minute winds of 45 km/h (30 mph). Strong wind shear prevented further development. Following an abrupt turn to the southwest, the depression weakened. The IMD downgraded the depression to a low on March 24, and the following day, the JTWC discontinued advisories.

An area of curved thunderstorms developed into a depression in the northwest Bay of Bengal at 03:00 UTC on August 17. The system intensified into a deep depression by the end of the day, reaching peak winds of 65 km/h (40 mph). It moved inland on August 18 near Chandabali, Odisha, and weakened as it continued northwestward through India. On August 21, the depression was last noted over southern Pakistan.

A low pressure in the western Bay of Bengal organized into a depression on October 4. On the next day, the IMD upgraded the system to a deep depression, estimating peak winds of 55 km/h (35 mph). The system developed spiral rainbands and an eye feature. Late on October 5, the deep depression moved ashore southeastern India near Machilipatnam, Andhra Pradesh. Nearby Gannavaram reported gusts of 74 km/h (46 mph). The system weakened while progressing inland, bringing heavy rainfall along its path. Storm-related flooding in southern Andhra Pradesh damaged crops and houses. The system weakened below depression status on October 7, and dissipated over northeastern India three days later. Across its path, the deep depression killed 38 people due to floods.

A low-pressure area developed into a depression on November 4 in the western Bay of Bengal near the southeastern Indian coast. Later that day, the system moved ashore Tamil Nadu near Karaikal with winds of 45 km/h (30 mph). By the next day, the depression weakened into a low-pressure area. The system dropped heavy rainfall along its path.

== Season effects ==
| Name | Dates | Peak intensity | | | Areas affected | Damage (USD) | Deaths | Ref(s). |
| Name | Dates | Category | Wind speed | Pressure | Areas affected | Damage (USD) | Deaths | Ref(s). |
|---|---|---|---|---|---|---|---|---|
| BOB 01 | March 21–24 | Depression | 45 km/h (30 mph) | Not specified | None | None | None | |
| BOB 02 | April 26 – May 2 | Extremely Severe Cyclonic Storm | 215 km/h (135 mph) | 940 hPa (27.76 inHg) | Bangladesh, Myanmar | 125 million | 350 | |
| ARB 01 | June 5–9 | Severe Cyclonic Storm | 100 km/h (60 mph) | 980 hPa (28.94 inHg) | Western India, Oman | | | |
| Deep depression | August 17–20 | Deep Depression | 55 km/h (35 mph) | 988 hPa (29.18 inHg) | India, Pakistan | None | None | |
| Deep depression | October 4–7 | Deep Depression | 55 km/h (35 mph) | 998 hPa (29.47 inHg) | India | | 38 | |
| BOB 03 | October 29–31 | Severe Cyclonic Storm | 110 km/h (70 mph) | 988 hPa (29.18 inHg) | India | 115 million | 304 | |
| Depression | November 4–5 | Depression | 45 km/h (30 mph) | Not specified | Southern India | None | None | |
| ARB 02 | November 13–20 | Very Severe Cyclonic Storm | 120 km/h (75 mph) | 984 hPa (29.06 inHg) | Somalia | | 30 | |
Season aggregates
| 5 systems | March 21 – November 20 | | 120 km/h (75 mph) | 940 hPa (27.76 inHg) | | >$240 million | 418 | |

== See also ==
- North Indian Ocean tropical cyclone season
- 1994 Atlantic hurricane season
- 1994 Pacific hurricane season
- 1994 Pacific typhoon season
- South-West Indian Ocean cyclone season: 1993–94, 1994–95
- Australian region cyclone season: 1993–94, 1994–95
- South Pacific cyclone season: 1993–94, 1994–95
