= Cyclone Geralda =

South-West Indian Ocean cyclone in 1994

Intense Tropical Cyclone Geralda
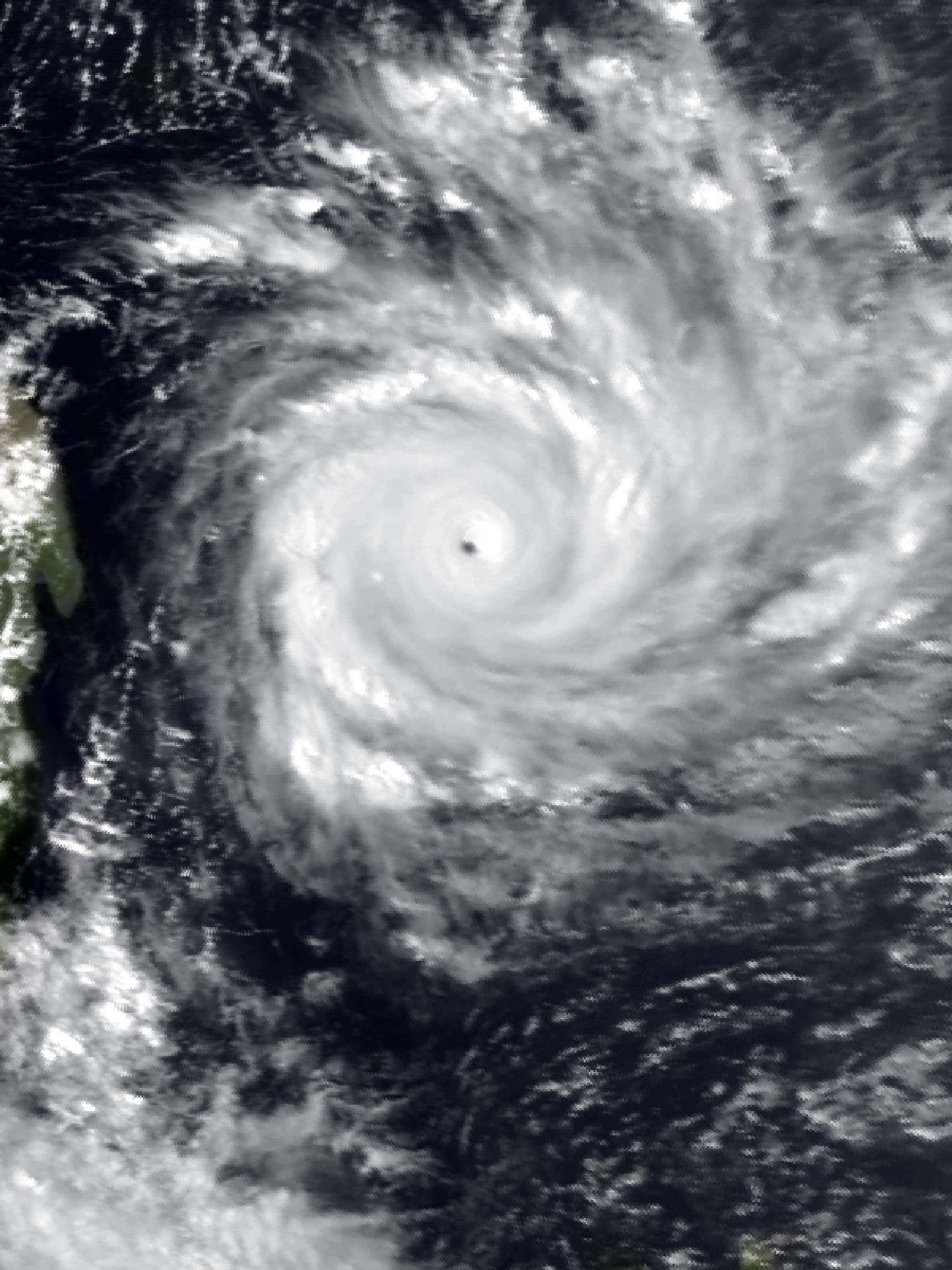
- Cyclone Geralda on 31 January shortly after attaining peak strength

Meteorological history
- Formed: 26 January 1994
- Extratropical: 8 February 1994
- Dissipated: 12 February 1994

Intense tropical cyclone
- 10-minute sustained (MFR)
- Highest winds: 205 km/h (125 mph)
- Lowest pressure: 905 hPa (mbar); 26.72 inHg

Category 5-equivalent tropical cyclone
- 1-minute sustained (SSHWS/JTWC)
- Highest winds: 270 km/h (165 mph)

Overall effects
- Fatalities: 231
- Missing: 73
- Damage: >$10 million (1994 USD)
- Areas affected: Madagascar
- IBTrACS
- Part of the 1993–94 South-West Indian Ocean cyclone season

Intense Tropical Cyclone Geralda was a powerful tropical cyclone that caused catastrophic damage in Madagascar in late January 1994, among the strongest to hit the country. It was also the most intense tropical cyclone worldwide in 1994. Cyclone Geralda originated from an area of low pressure over the Indian Ocean on 25 January. Over the following few days, the depression underwent gradual intensification, reaching its peak intensity with ten-minute sustained winds of 205 km/h (127 mph) on 31 January. It eventually made landfall near Toamasina, Madagascar after weakening from its peak intensity, and substantially weakened within hours of moving onshore. By 5 February, Geralda had degenerated into a land depression, and became extratropical three days later. Geralda's remnants dissipated on 12 February.

Geralda was the second cyclone in as many months to strike eastern Madagascar, after Daisy in January. Geralda produced wind gusts as strong as 350 km/h (220 mph), which were the highest worldwide for several decades. The cyclone also dropped heavy rainfall that caused flooding, particularly in valleys. About 80% of the city of Toamasina was destroyed, including most schools, homes, and churches. The cyclone heavily damaged roads and rail lines, which later disrupted relief efforts. In the capital Antananarivo, Geralda killed 43 people after flooding many houses. Overall, more than 40,000 homes were destroyed, leaving 356,000 people homeless. Nationwide, the cyclone killed 231 people and caused over $10 million in damage (1994 USD). (Note: All damage totals are in 1994 United States dollars unless otherwise noted.) Relief work in the storm's aftermath was hampered by lack of coordination, and the Malagasy military were deployed to help storm victims. Few stocks were pre-positioned, causing food prices to rise greatly. Several countries and departments of the United Nations donated money or supplies to the country.

== Meteorological history ==
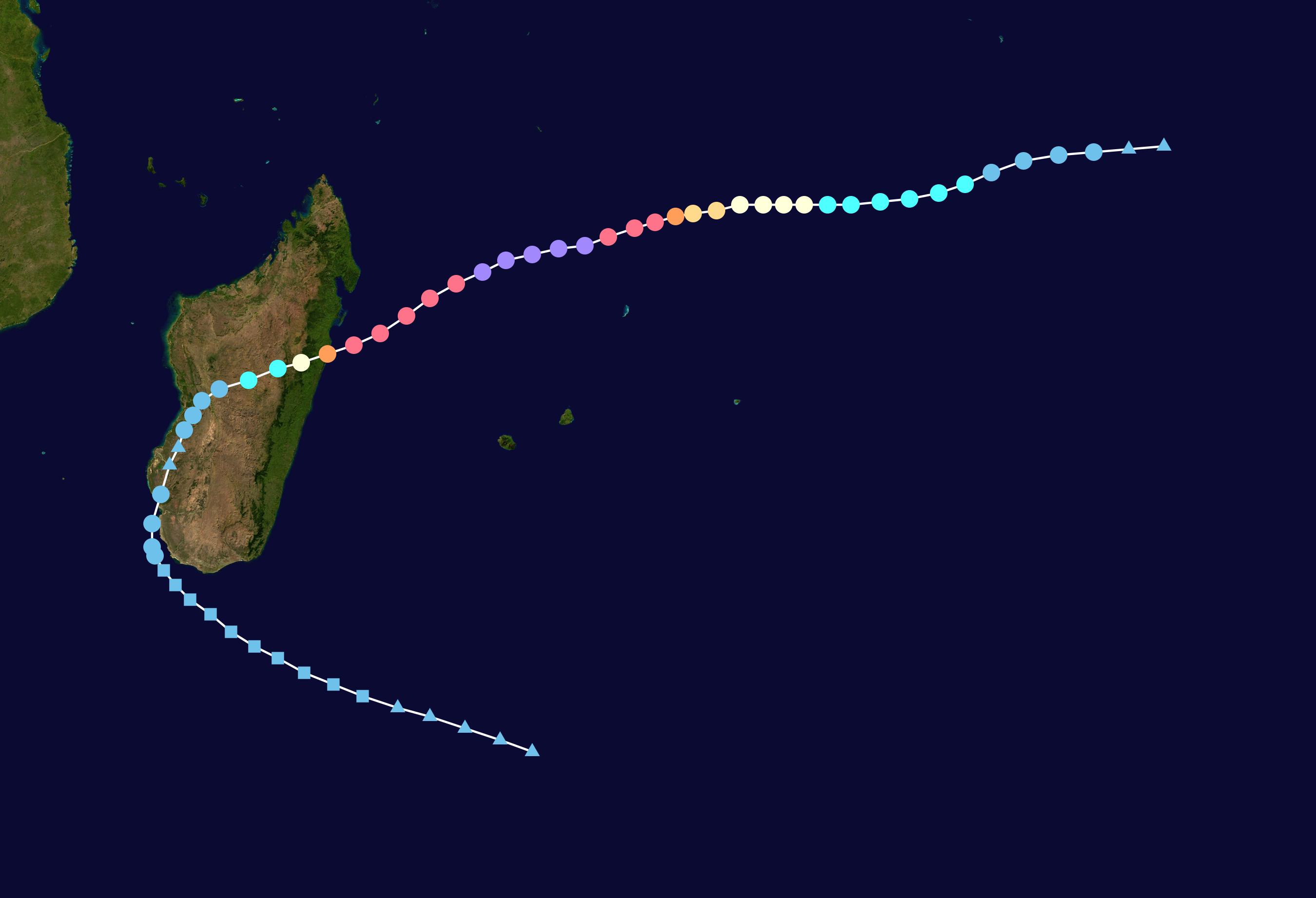
Map plotting the storm's track and intensity, according to the Saffir–Simpson scale Map key Saffir–Simpson scale Tropical depression (≤38 mph, ≤62 km/h) Tropical storm (39–73 mph, 63–118 km/h) Category 1 (74–95 mph, 119–153 km/h) Category 2 (96–110 mph, 154–177 km/h) Category 3 (111–129 mph, 178–208 km/h) Category 4 (130–156 mph, 209–251 km/h) Category 5 (≥157 mph, ≥252 km/h) Unknown Storm type Tropical cyclone Subtropical cyclone Extratropical cyclone, remnant low, tropical disturbance, or monsoon depression

In late January 1994, the south Indian Ocean Intertropical Convergence Zone produced widespread convection from the eastern coast of Africa to Indonesia. Late on 25 January, the Joint Typhoon Warning Center (JTWC) (Note: The Joint Typhoon Warning Center is a joint United States Navy – United States Air Force task force that issues tropical cyclone warnings for the region.) began monitoring a low-pressure area about halfway between Madagascar and Indonesia, later giving it the designation 13S. The following day, the Météo-France on Réunion (MFR) classified the system as a tropical disturbance. (Note: Météo-France is the official Regional Specialized Meteorological Center for the south-west Indian Ocean, based out of Réunion.) By that time, the system had developed an organized area of convection with curved rainbands and was strengthening quickly; early on 28 January, it developed a central dense overcast. In response, MFR upgraded the system to a moderate tropical storm and named it Geralda. At that time, the storm was moving generally west-southwestward due to a ridge extending from Madagascar to the Mascarene Islands. High water temperatures fueled further development, first into a moderate tropical storm late on 28 January and then into a tropical cyclone 24 hours later. By then, the JTWC had upgraded Geralda to the equivalent of a minimal hurricane.

Continuing generally to the west-southwest, Geralda intensified further, and MFR upgraded it to intense tropical cyclone status on 30 January. The cyclone developed a well-defined eye 35 km (22 mi) in diameter and grew to a size of 1,000 km (620 mi) in diameter. At 0600 UTC on 31 January, the JTWC estimated peak 1–minute sustained winds of 270 km/h (165 mph), equivalent to a Category 5 hurricane on the Saffir-Simpson scale. Six hours later, Geralda's appearance on satellite imagery warranted a Dvorak rating of 7.0. Based on this, MFR estimated a minimum barometric pressure of 905 mbar (26.7 inHg) and peak 10–minute winds of 205 km/h (125 mph), just shy of very intense tropical cyclone status. At that time, gusts were estimated at over 300 km/h (190 mph). Geralda had intensified from a tropical disturbance to its peak intensity in only five days, which was described by MFR as "an exceptional phenomenon". Near peak intensity, the center of Geralda passed about 45 km (28 mi) northwest of Tromelin Island, offshore eastern Madagascar.

After maintaining its peak winds for about 18 hours, Geralda weakened slightly while approaching eastern Madagascar. At 0600 UTC on 2 February, MFR estimated the winds were around 175 km/h (110 mph). At about 1100 UTC that day, the cyclone made landfall just north of Toamasina as an intense tropical cyclone, where a pressure of 943 mbar (27.8 inHg) was reported. Officials considered Geralda the strongest storm to hit the country since a cyclone in March 1927. Geralda weakened rapidly over the mountainous terrain of Madagascar, passing over the capital Antananarivo late on 2 February; both the JTWC and MFR had downgraded the cyclone to tropical depression status by the next day. About 30 hours after its first landfall, Geralda briefly emerged into the Mozambique Channel late on 3 February. However, a trough soon turned it to the south, and Geralda crossed over western Madagascar, reaching open waters on 5 February. By that time, the winds had decreased to 45 km/h (30 mph). An approaching polar trough turned Geralda to the southeast on 6 February, and the cyclone became extratropical two days later. However, MFR continued tracking the remnants of Geralda until 12 February.

== Impact and aftermath ==
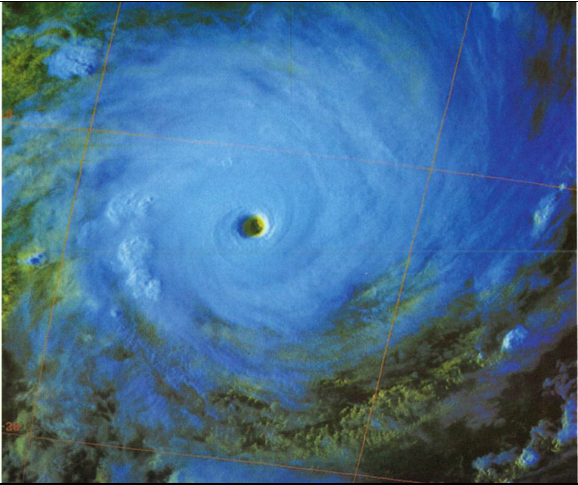
Satellite image of Cyclone Geralda on February 1

Tromelin Island was the first landmass affected by Geralda. The island was just outside the eyewall, and experienced wind gusts of 180 km/h (110 mph).

Cyclone Geralda struck Madagascar just weeks after Tropical Cyclone Daisy affected the same general area. While Geralda was approaching the country, officials declared Emergency Phase 3 for Toamasina Province, indicating immediate danger, and Emergency Phase 1 for Antananarivo, which is a general alert.

As Geralda moved ashore, the cyclone produced wind gusts as strong as 350 km/h (220 mph), among the strongest gusts worldwide in several decades. The storm also dropped heavy rainfall that caused landslides and severe flooding, mostly in Toamasina Province. About 80% of the city of Toamasina was destroyed, including the country's only petroleum refinery at the time. Damage to the refinery alone was estimated at $800,000.

An early estimate indicated that 95% of schools, homes, and churches sustained severe damage to complete destruction in the city, leaving 50,000 people homeless. In the harbor at Toamasina, Geralda sank seven ships, and throughout the city, power outages and road damage were commonplace. Elsewhere in Madagascar, Geralda wrecked houses and bridges in Fénérive. On Île Sainte-Marie, all power lines and 90% of plantations were destroyed. Brickaville, to the south of Toamasina, experienced severe flooding up to 3 m (9.8 ft) deep. Lack of basic repairs before the storm contributed to roads and bridges being washed away there. The cyclone killed 43 people when it flooded large portions of Antananarivo, leaving 60,000 people homeless. High rainfall damaged houses in the city and cut off roads outside of the city. Damage was heavy in valleys where flash flooding occurred. Across Madagascar, flooding wrecked over 300,000 ha (740,000 acres) of crop fields, affecting 70% of the rice crop, and killed more than 13,000 cattle. The combined impact of Geralda and earlier Cyclone Daisy damaged or destroyed more than 40,000 homes, leaving at least 356,000 people homeless. The storms also left severe damage to roads and rail systems. A total of 20 national roads and several secondary roads were disrupted. The rail line between Moramanga near the capital and Brickaville near the coast was damaged. Overall, Cyclone Geralda killed at least 231 people, with 73 missing as of MFR's annual cyclone report on the season; the storm also injured 267 people and caused over $10 million in damage (1994 USD).

In the aftermath, there was no pre-existing method of dealing with a storm of such magnitude, and most local governments failed to respond immediately due to lack of coordination. As a result, agencies spent much time in dealing with the logistics of the aftermath. There were few food supplies that were pre-positioned. The Malagasy government worked with the United Nations to create a committee, which met weekly and addressed various facets of the recovery. Malagasy officials deployed members of the military to help storm victims, although damaged roads initially hampered relief efforts. Due to crop damage, the price of rice increased by 300% in the country, and there were food shortages in Antananarivo, along with fuel shortages elsewhere. In Toamasina, industrial activity was expected to take six months to resume production. Médecins Sans Frontières helped assure the cleanliness of shelters in Antananarivo, while CARE delivered food to residents in Brickaville. There were health issues related to the widespread flooding, prompting the government to distribute medical supplies for 60,000 people. Shortly after Geralda struck, the Malagasy government requested international assistance. The United Nations Department of Human Services provided an emergency $30,000 relief grant, and UNICEF later provided about $2.3 million in assistance. The European Union provided about $560,000 worth of medicine and relief. The French government sent $5 million worth of supplies via airplane from Réunion, including food and medicine. Eight other countries sent assistance in the form of money or relief items.

By about two weeks after the storm's landfall, water and power service were being restored in Toamasina, although by that time, 40% of the communications network remained offline. By 16 February, the road from Antananrivo and Toamasina had been reopened. The Malagasy government imported oil for several months while its refinery was out of order. Non-government organizations provided rice to stabilize prices. The damaged rail line between Antananarivo and the coast was rebuilt in 2003. Schools that were repaired following Geralda were later successfully used as shelters.

== See also ==
- Cyclone Honorinina – Powerful cyclone in 1984 that took a similar track, killing 99 people
- Cyclone Gafilo – Powerful cyclone in 2004 that took a similar track, killing 363 people
- Cyclone Batsirai – Powerful cyclone in 2022
