= 1994 Bangladesh cyclone =

Category 4 North Indian tropical cyclone in 1994

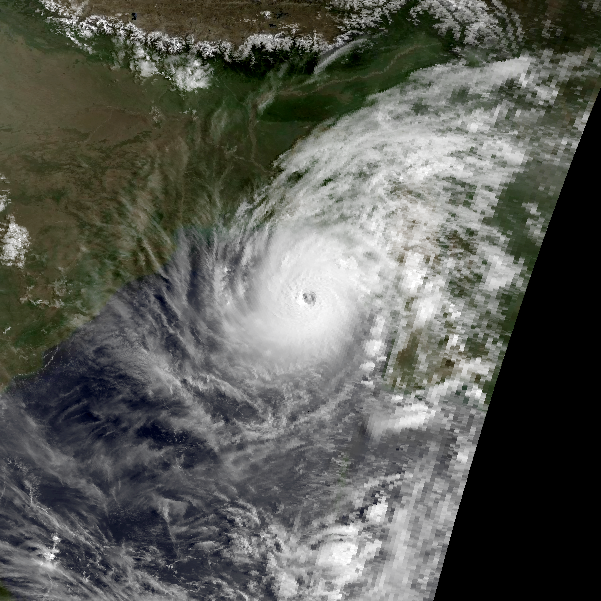
- Satellite image of the cyclone near landfall on May 2

Meteorological history
- Formed: April 29, 1994
- Dissipated: May 3, 1994

Extremely severe cyclonic storm
- 3-minute sustained (IMD)
- Highest winds: 215 km/h (130 mph)
- Lowest pressure: 940 hPa (mbar); 27.76 inHg

Category 4-equivalent tropical cyclone
- 1-minute sustained (SSHWS/JTWC)
- Highest winds: 230 km/h (145 mph)
- Lowest pressure: 916 hPa (mbar); 27.05 inHg

Overall effects
- Fatalities: 350
- Damage: $125 million
- Areas affected: Bangladesh, Northeast India, Myanmar
- Part of the 1994 North Indian Ocean cyclone season

The 1994 Bangladesh cyclone was a powerful tropical cyclone in the Bay of Bengal. The cyclone closely followed the path, strength, and time of year of a deadly cyclone in 1991 that killed more than 138,000 people. The 1994 cyclone formed on April 29 as a depression, which organized and intensified significantly over the subsequent few days. On May 2, the cyclone attained winds of 215 km/h (135 mph), according to the India Meteorological Department (IMD). That day, the storm made landfall in southeastern Bangladesh, and rapidly weakened over land, before dissipating on May 3.

Ahead of the storm's landfall, about 450,000 people evacuated to storm shelters built since the 1991 storm. Upon moving ashore, the cyclone dropped 190 mm (7.5 in) of precipitation and produced winds of 278 km/h (173 mph) in Teknaf Upazila. Total storm damage was estimated at $125 million (1994 USD). The cyclone damaged or destroyed more than 78,000 houses, leaving about 500,000 people homeless. Along its path, the storm killed at least 350 people, including at least 126 fishermen from Thailand who were lost and presumed killed. In southeastern Bangladesh, the cyclone wrecked Rohingya refugee camps, killing 85 people. The Bangladeshi government managed the country's response to the disaster, providing food, clothing, and medical care.

== Meteorological history ==
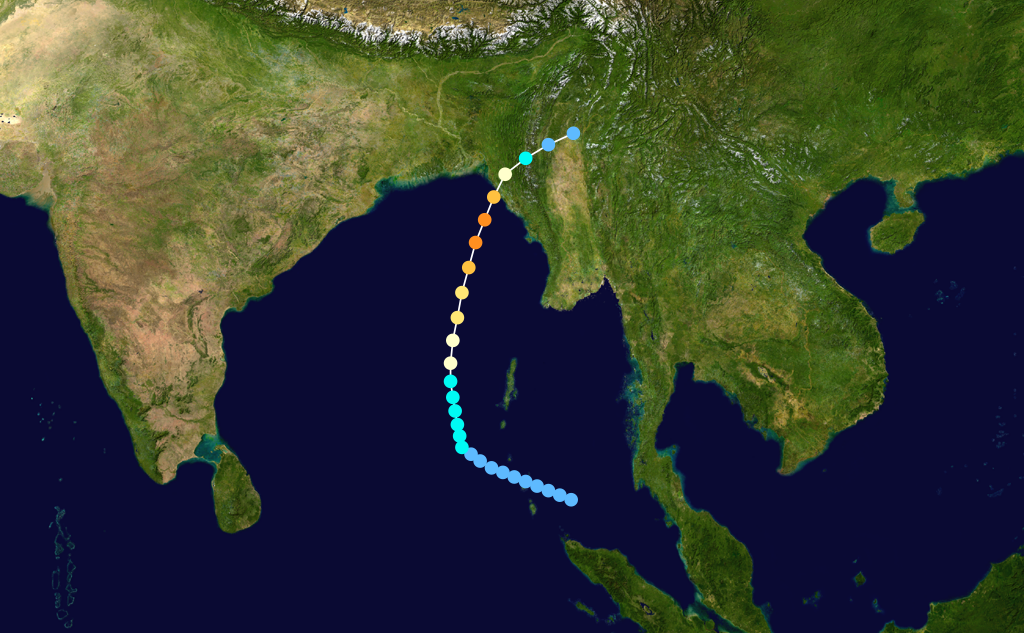
Map plotting the storm's track and intensity, according to the Saffir–Simpson scale Map key Saffir–Simpson scale Tropical depression (≤38 mph, ≤62 km/h) Tropical storm (39–73 mph, 63–118 km/h) Category 1 (74–95 mph, 119–153 km/h) Category 2 (96–110 mph, 154–177 km/h) Category 3 (111–129 mph, 178–208 km/h) Category 4 (130–156 mph, 209–251 km/h) Category 5 (≥157 mph, ≥252 km/h) Unknown Storm type Tropical cyclone Subtropical cyclone Extratropical cyclone, remnant low, tropical disturbance, or monsoon depression

On April 26, an area of persistent convection, or thunderstorms, was located in the southeastern Bay of Bengal, in the Andaman Sea. That day, the American-based Joint Typhoon Warning Center (JTWC) mentioned the weather system in its Significant Tropical Weather Outlook. The area of thunderstorms moved to the west-northwest through the Nicobar Islands, gradually organizing around a developing circulation. On April 29, the IMD first classified the system as a depression, and the JTWC initiated advisories on the storm, designating it Tropical Cyclone 02B. By the end of the day, the IMD had upgraded the depression to a cyclonic storm. This was due to the convection organizing into a central dense overcast, with an eye feature in the storm's center.

Steered by a ridge to the northeast, the storm tracked north-northwestward at first, before turning northeastward while rounding the ridge. Late on April 30, the JTWC upgraded the storm to the equivalent of hurricane status, with sustained winds estimated at 120 km/h (75 mph). A day later, the IMD upgraded the storm to a very severe cyclonic storm, by which time the eye had become better organized. The agency upgraded it to an extremely severe cyclonic storm on May 2 as the storm neared the northeast coast of the Bay of Bengal. That day at 06:00 UTC, the JTWC estimated peak winds of 230 km/h (145 mph), but the agency assessed that the cyclone subsequently weakened. At 12:00 UTC on the same day, the IMD estimated peak winds of 215 km/h (135 mph). As the storm neared the Bangladesh coast, the storm was tracked by radar, with the eye diameter estimated at 30 km (19 mi). At around 17:00 UTC on May 2, the cyclone made landfall in southeastern Bangladesh about 30 km (19 mi) north of Teknaf Upazila. The storm rapidly weakened over land while continuing northeastward into Myanmar. The JTWC and IMD discontinued advisories by May 3.

== Preparations ==
The 1994 storm closely followed the path of a deadly cyclone in 1991 that occurred around the same time of year and killed more than 138,000 people. After the 1991 storm, the United Nations Development Programme (UNDP) helped Bangladesh improve its disaster management program. Ahead of the 1994 storm, the Bangladesh Meteorological Department issued timely warnings for residents, and for fishermen to remain close to the coast. Officials requested that fishermen remain close to the coast. The Bangladesh Red Crescent Society sent volunteers to warn about the storm's arrival. About 450,000 people evacuated ahead of the storm, utilizing about 900 brick shelters built since 1991. Airlines canceled flights in and out of Chittagong. The Bangladesh Air Force evacuated planes away from Chittagong, having lost 44 aircraft in the 1991 storm.

== Impacts ==
The cyclone moved ashore near the Bangladesh–Myanmar border, producing a storm surge, high winds, and heavy rainfall. By comparison, the deadly 1991 storm struck near high tide. In southeastern Bangladesh, Teknaf Upazila reported 190 mm (7.5 in) of precipitation on the day the storm moved ashore, as well as winds of 278 km/h (173 mph). Nearby Cox's Bazar reported winds of 139 km/h (86 mph). Along its path, the cyclone left U$125 million in damage, injured 3,559 people, and killed at least 350 people. The death toll included at least 126 fishermen from Thailand, 133 people in Bangladesh, and 17 fatalities in Myanmar. A fleet of 400 fishermen from Thailand encountered the storm, with 19 of 26 vessels sunk during the storm; 181 fishermen survived and were shipped by the Thai Navy about two weeks after the storm, with at least 200 fishermen listed as missing and presumed dead.

Throughout Bangladesh, the cyclone destroyed 52,097 houses and damaged another 17,476, especially those not made of brick. The resulting damage left about 500,000 people homeless. The storm also wrecked or damaged 194 schools and 28 churches. The storm damaged or destroyed 81,898 acres (33,143 ha) of crops, with 10,550 farm animals killed. About 169 km (105 mi) of roads were damaged, along with 98 bridges. High waters from the cyclone inundated St. Martin's Island. The island, as well as Sandwip and other offshore islands, lost communications with the mainland. 192 fishermen from Thailand lost their boats in the storm. In the Teknaf region where the storm moved ashore, the storm damaged more than 95% of houses, knocked down 95% of the trees, and completely destroyed the local rice and betel crops. Debris and downed trees blocked roads connecting Teknaf with Cox's Bazar, while floods washed away the main coastal road between Cox's Bazar and Chittagong. About 25% of houses were damaged in Cox's Bazar, with about half of the local crops destroyed. High winds knocked down power lines across the region. Much of western Ukhia Upazila was damaged. About half of the crops were lost on Kutubdia island. On Maheshkhali island, the storm wrecked 25% of the boats and damaged more than one-third of the houses. The cyclone damaged or destroyed 80 Rohingya refugees camps, leaving about 100,000 refugees homeless; 85 refugees killed during the storm, many of whom killed by flying debris.

In neighboring Myanmar, the cyclone left heavy damage in the westernmost portions of the country, particularly Maungdaw and Buthidaung townships. The storm damaged or destroyed 8,872 houses, leaving more than 8,000 people homeless. In the country, the storm left at least K60 million (US$10 million) in damage. The storm also damaged or destroyed 82 schools, 24 hospitals, a telecommunications center, and a power station.

== Aftermath ==
After the storm struck, Bangladesh's Prime Minister, Khaleda Zia, and the country's Ministry of Disaster Management and Relief coordinated disaster relief, assisted by members of the military. This marked the first occasion that the Bangladesh government was able to respond to the emergency needs after a significant natural disaster. In the days following the storm, local teams surveyed the most affected areas for damage and needs. The Bangladesh government distributed food, clothing, and other emergency supplies to storm victims. Three public officials were arrested for embezzling supplies. In the worst affected areas, 150 medical teams provided medical care and purified water. The Bangladesh Red Crescent Society provided two weeks' worth of food for up to 50,000 people. UNICEF sent a convoy with food, water, and plastic sheeting to Teknaf. The UNDP provided plastic water containers and water purification tablets. The United Nations High Commissioner for Refugees provided emergency supplies and funding for the affected refugee camps. Residents gathered and sold the wood from the downed trees, and the government provided resources to replant the lost trees.

In Myanmar, officials opened up a relief center in Maungdaw. Local and state government worked to provide supplies to affected residents. Japan offered ¥11.8 million (JPY, US$112,000) in emergency aid for tents, sheets, and towels.

== See also ==
- 1988 Bangladesh cyclone – a powerful and deadly cyclone that struck Bangladesh
- 1991 Bangladesh cyclone – A powerful Category 5-equivalent cyclone that killed over 138,000 people, one of the deadliest tropical cyclones recorded
- May 1997 Bangladesh cyclone – a powerful and deadly cyclone that struck Bangladesh
- Cyclone Forrest – struck northwestern Myanmar in November 1992
- Cyclone Mocha – took a similar track in May 2023
