= 1993–94 South Pacific cyclone season =

Tropical cyclone season

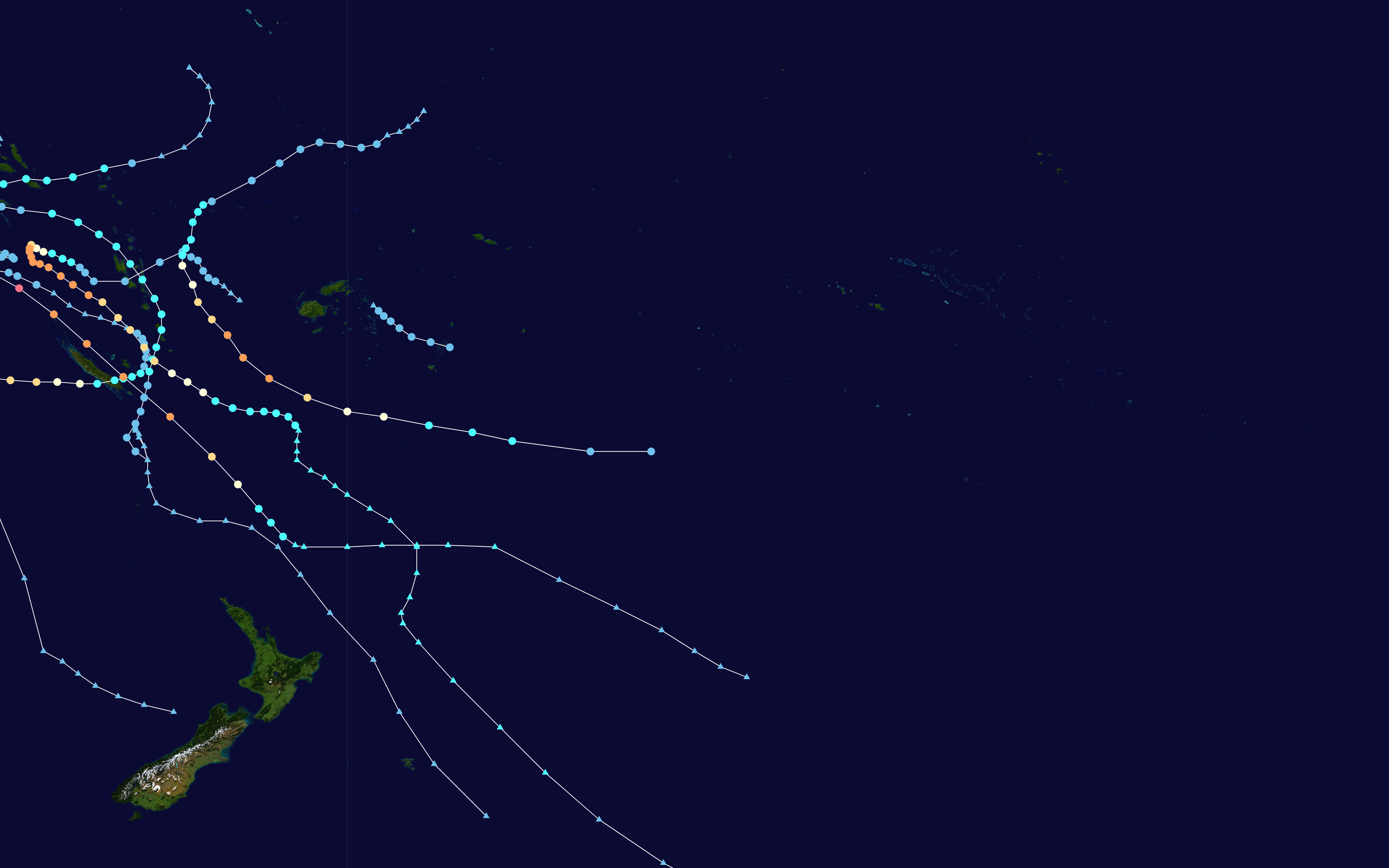
- Season summary map

Seasonal boundaries
- First system formed: December 26, 1993
- Last system dissipated: April 25, 1994

Strongest storm
- Name: Theodore
  - Maximum winds: 175 km/h (110 mph) (10-minute sustained)
  - Lowest pressure: 930 hPa (mbar)

Seasonal statistics
- Total depressions: 7
- Tropical cyclones: 5
- Severe tropical cyclones: 4
- Total fatalities: None reported
- Total damage: Unknown

Related articles
- 1993–94 South-West Indian Ocean cyclone season; 1993–94 Australian region cyclone season

The 1993–94 South Pacific cyclone season was a near average tropical cyclone season with five tropical cyclones occurring within the South Pacific to the east of 160°E. The season officially ran from November 1, 1993, to April 30, 1994, with the first disturbance of the season forming on December 26 and the last disturbance dissipating on April 25.

During the season, tropical cyclones were officially monitored by the Regional Specialized Meteorological Center (RSMC) in Nadi, Fiji, and the Tropical Cyclone Warning Centers (TCWC) in Brisbane, Australia and Wellington, New Zealand. Throughout the season the United States Navy also monitored the basin and issued unofficial warnings, through its Joint Typhoon Warning Center (JTWC) and Naval Western and Oceanography Center (NWOC). Tropical cyclones that were located between 160°E and 120°W as well as the Equator and 25°S were monitored by RSMC Nadi while any that were located to the south of 25°S between 160°E and 120°W were monitored by TCWC Wellington. During the season the JTWC issued warnings on any tropical cyclone that was located between 160°E and 180° while the NPMOC issued warnings for tropical cyclones forming between the 180° and the American coast. RSMC Nadi and TCWC Wellington both used the Australian Tropical Cyclone Intensity Scale, and measured windspeeds over a 10-minute period during the season, while the JTWC and the NPMOC measured sustained windspeeds over a 1-minute period.

== Systems ==
=== Severe Tropical Cyclone Rewa ===
- Category 3 severe tropical cyclone (Australian scale)
- Category 2 tropical cyclone (SSHWS)
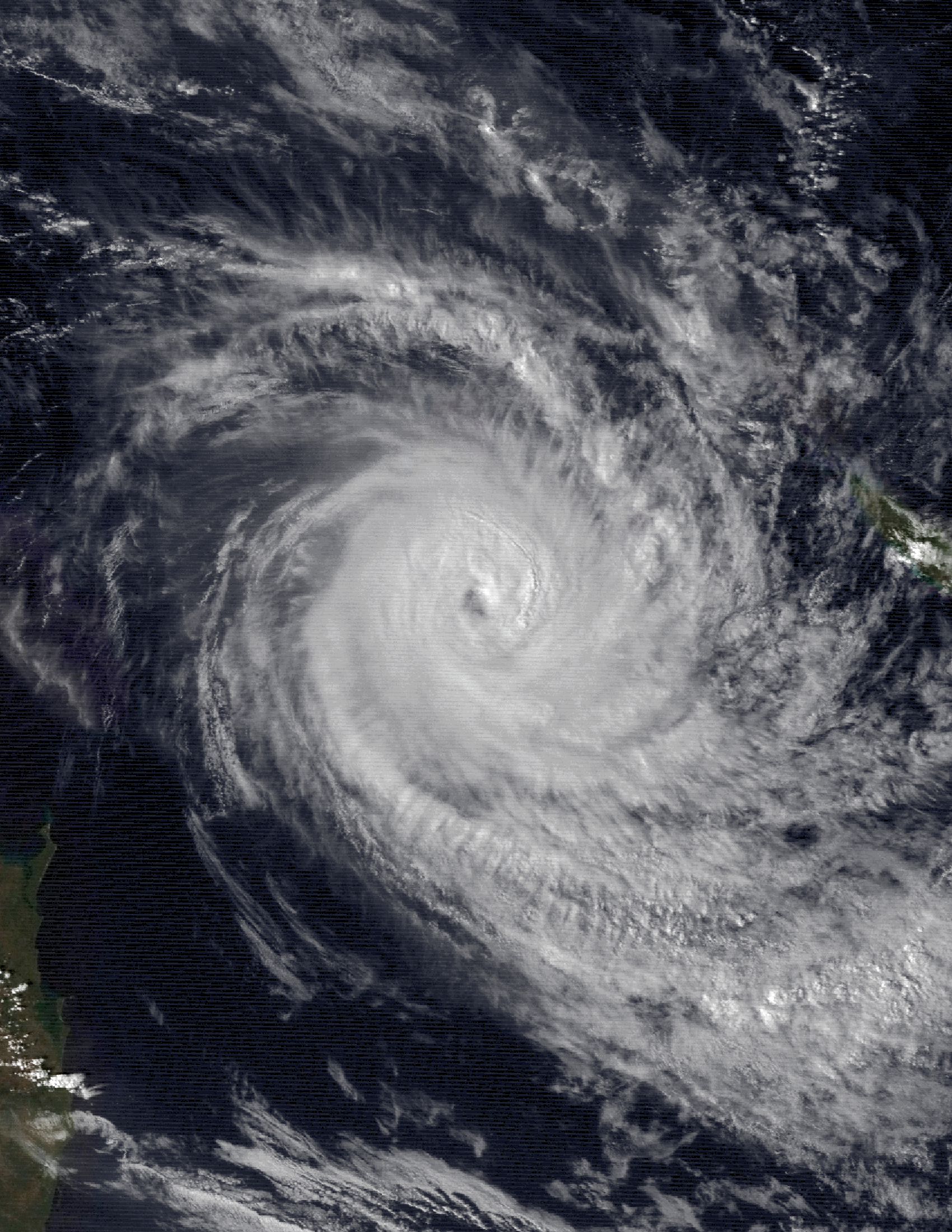
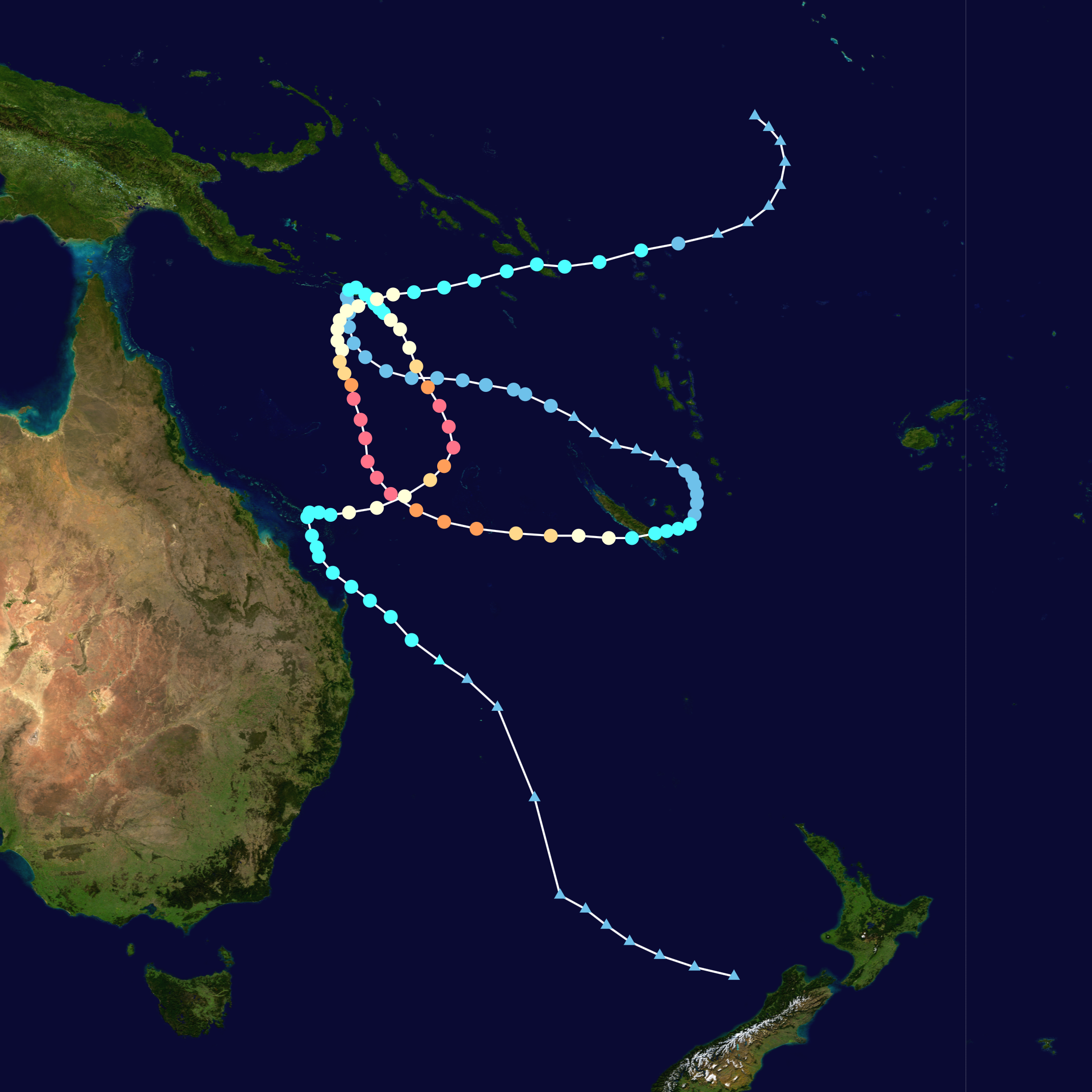
- Duration: December 28 – January 10 (Out of basin from December 29-January 4)
- Peak intensity: 150 km/h (90 mph) (10-min); 950 hPa (mbar)

Early on December 26, the JTWC started to monitor a tropical disturbance that had developed about 575 km (355 mi) to the south-east of Nauru. Over the next couple of days the disturbance gradually developed as it moved towards the south-southwest under the influence of a north-easterly flow. Early on December 28, TCWC Nadi started to monitor the disturbance as a tropical depression. Later that day, the JTWC classified the depression as Tropical Cyclone 05P, before TCWC Nadi reported that the system had intensified into a category 1 tropical cyclone on the Australian tropical cyclone intensity scale and named it Rewa. Over the next few days, the system gradually intensified under the influence of favourable upper-level winds while it moved towards the south-southwest, passing through the Solomon Islands on December 29 and affecting the southeastern islands of Papua New Guinea. As it moved through the Solomon Islands, Rewa moved out of the South Pacific basin and into the Australian region.

After affecting New Caledonia, Rewa weakened into a tropical depression and moved towards the northwest over the next few days, before re-entering the Australian basin during January 10 and started to show signs of reintensification. Over the next few days the cyclone moved towards the north north-west and started to affect Papua New Guinea for the second time before it was renamed Rewa during January 13 while it recurved and started to move towards the south-west. Over the next few days the cyclone continued to move to the south-east towards the South Pacific basin, before as it peaked in intensity on January 16 as a category 5 severe tropical cyclone, Rewa turned and started to move towards the south-west. Over the next few days, the cyclone gradually weakened while it moved towards the south-west and a predicted landfall near Mackay in Queensland. However, during January 18, Rewa interacted with an upper level trough and as a result turned and started to move towards the south-east along the Queensland coast. Rewa then degenerated into an extratropical cyclone during January 20, with its remnants last noted bringing heavy rain to New Zealand on January 23.

=== Tropical Cyclone 07P ===
- Tropical depression (SSHWS)
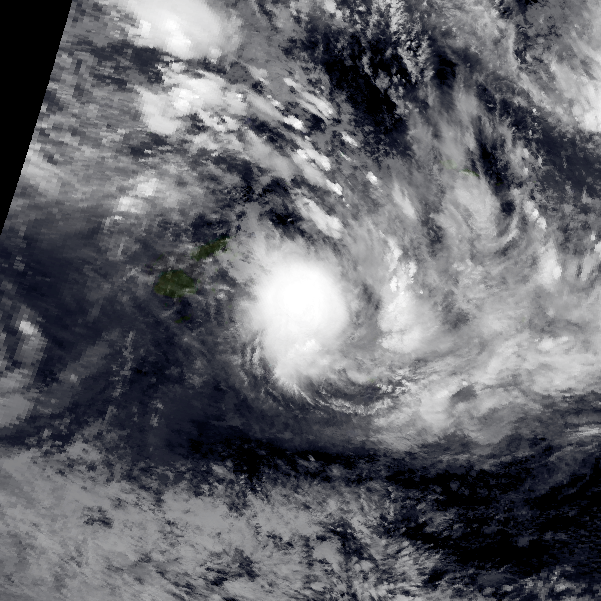
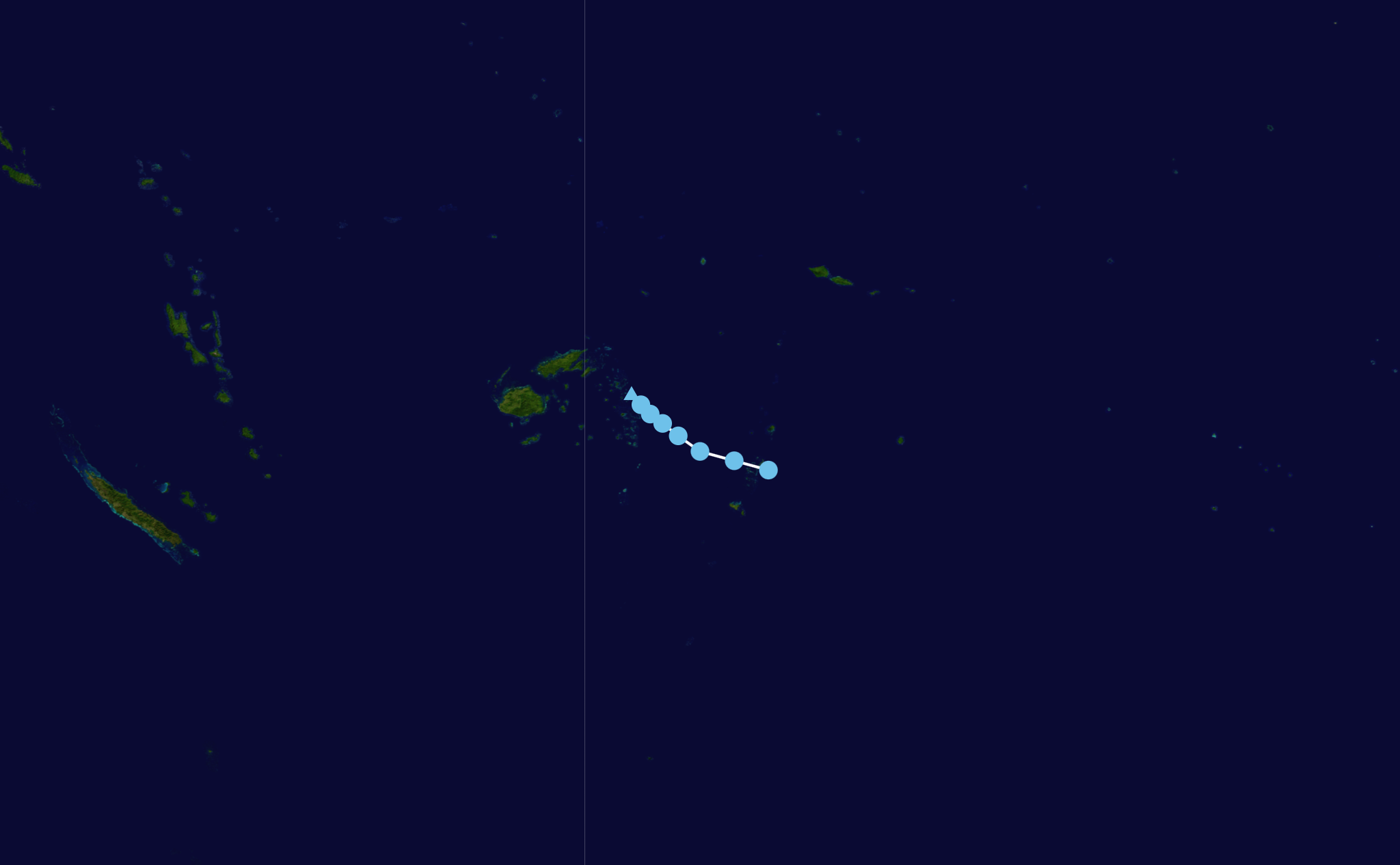
- Duration: January 6 – January 8
- Peak intensity: 55 km/h (35 mph) (1-min); 1002 hPa (mbar)

On January 6, the NPMOC reported that Tropical Cyclone 07P, had developed out of an area of low pressure, that had persisted for several days near Fiji with peak windspeeds of 55 km/h (35 mph) equivalent to a tropical depression. During the next day the depression remained broad and poorly organized as it moved towards the southeast. Later that day 07P moved across Tonga's northern islands, before the NPMOC issued their final advisory on January 8 as the system weakened into a remnant low.

=== Severe Tropical Cyclone Sarah ===
- Category 3 severe tropical cyclone (Australian scale)
- Category 3 tropical cyclone (SSHWS)
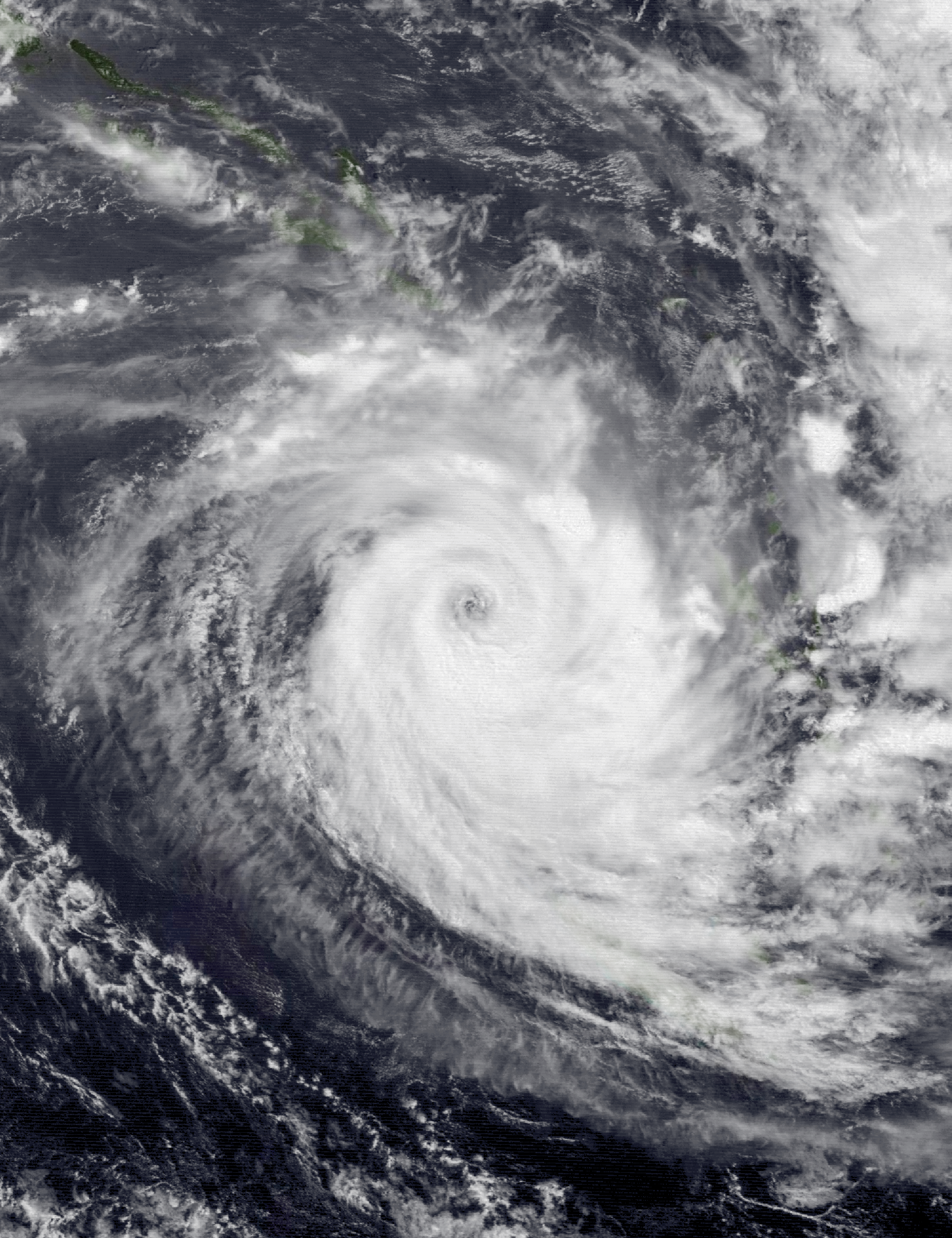
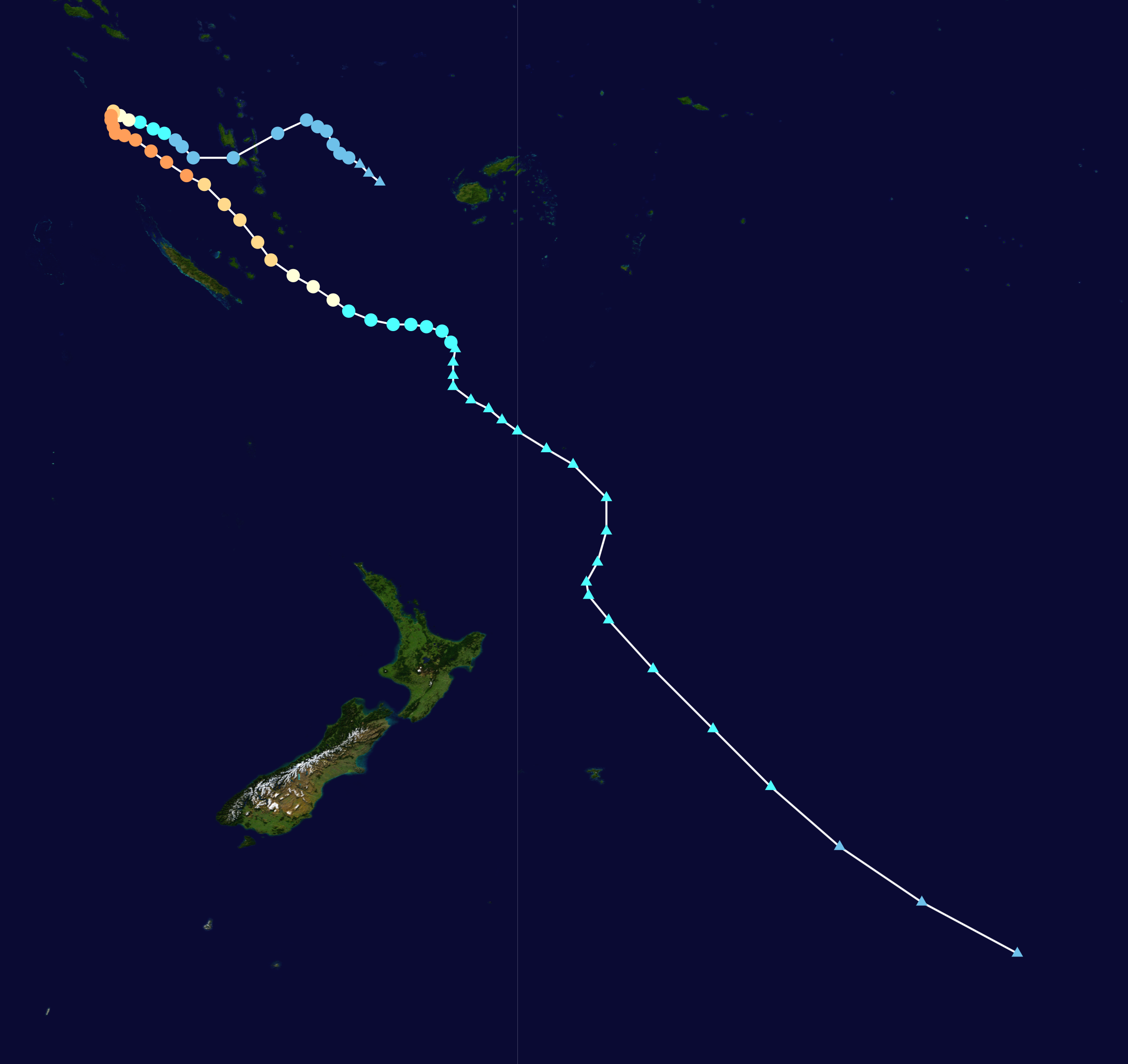
- Duration: January 22 – February 4
- Peak intensity: 155 km/h (100 mph) (10-min); 945 hPa (mbar)

On January 18, a weak low pressure area developed to the north of Fiji, within a trough of low pressure that extended from a weakening Cyclone Rewa to the northwest of Fiji. Over the next few days the low moved towards the west and passed between the Vanuation islands of Vila and Santo on January 21. Once the low had moved into the Coral Sea it started to rapidly develop further, with both RSMC Nadi and the JTWC reporting early on January 22, that the low had developed into a tropical cyclone, with the latter naming it Sarah.

=== Severe Tropical Cyclone Theodore ===
- Category 4 severe tropical cyclone (Australian scale)
- Category 4 tropical cyclone (SSHWS)
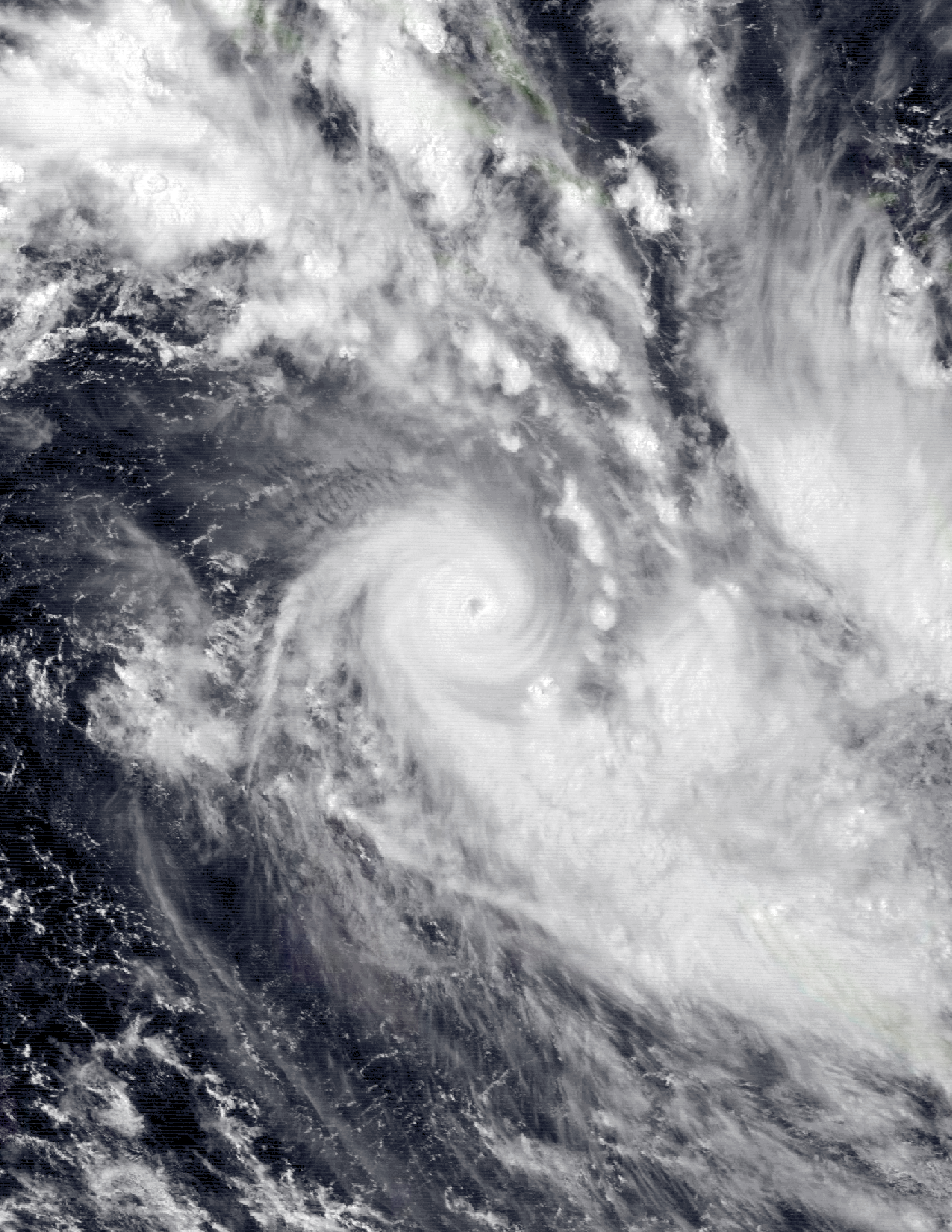
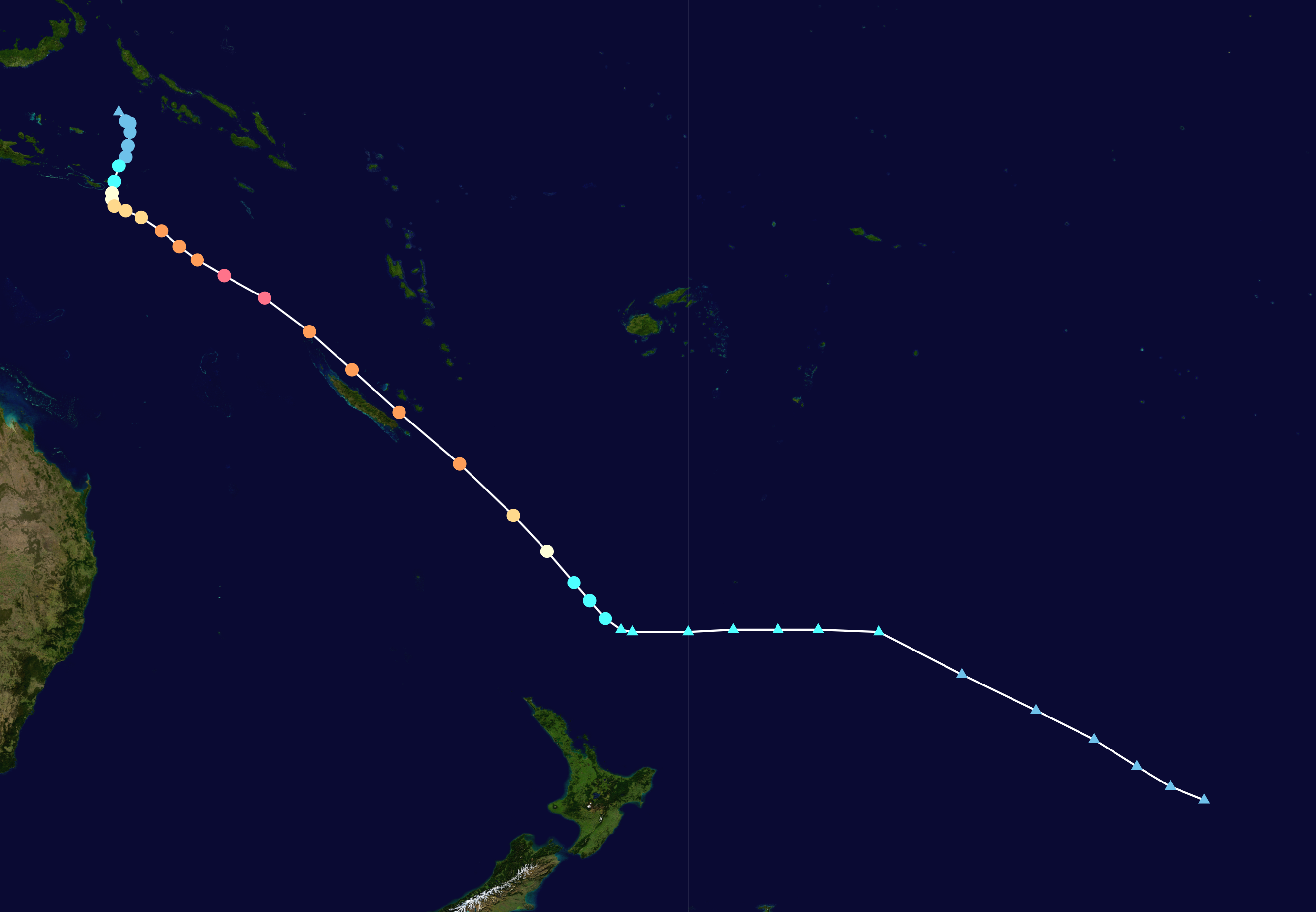
- Duration: February 26 (Entered basin) – March 3
- Peak intensity: 185 km/h (115 mph) (10-min); 933 hPa (mbar)

Severe Tropical Cyclone Theodore existed from February 26 to March 3.

=== Severe Tropical Cyclone Tomas ===
- Category 3 severe tropical cyclone (Australian scale)
- Category 3 tropical cyclone (SSHWS)
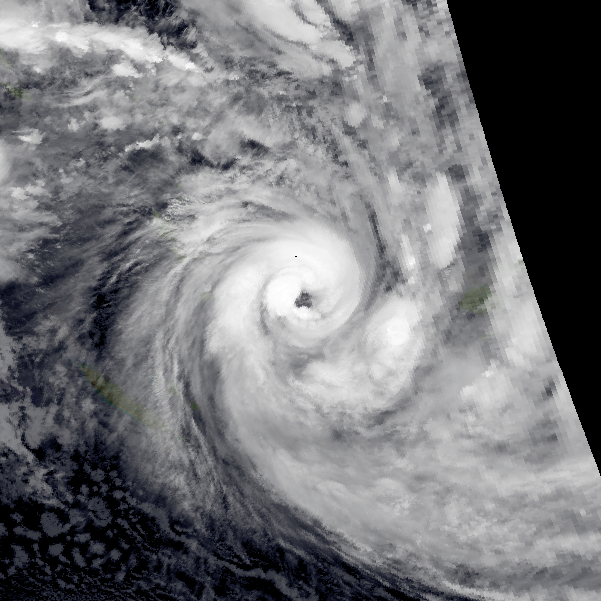
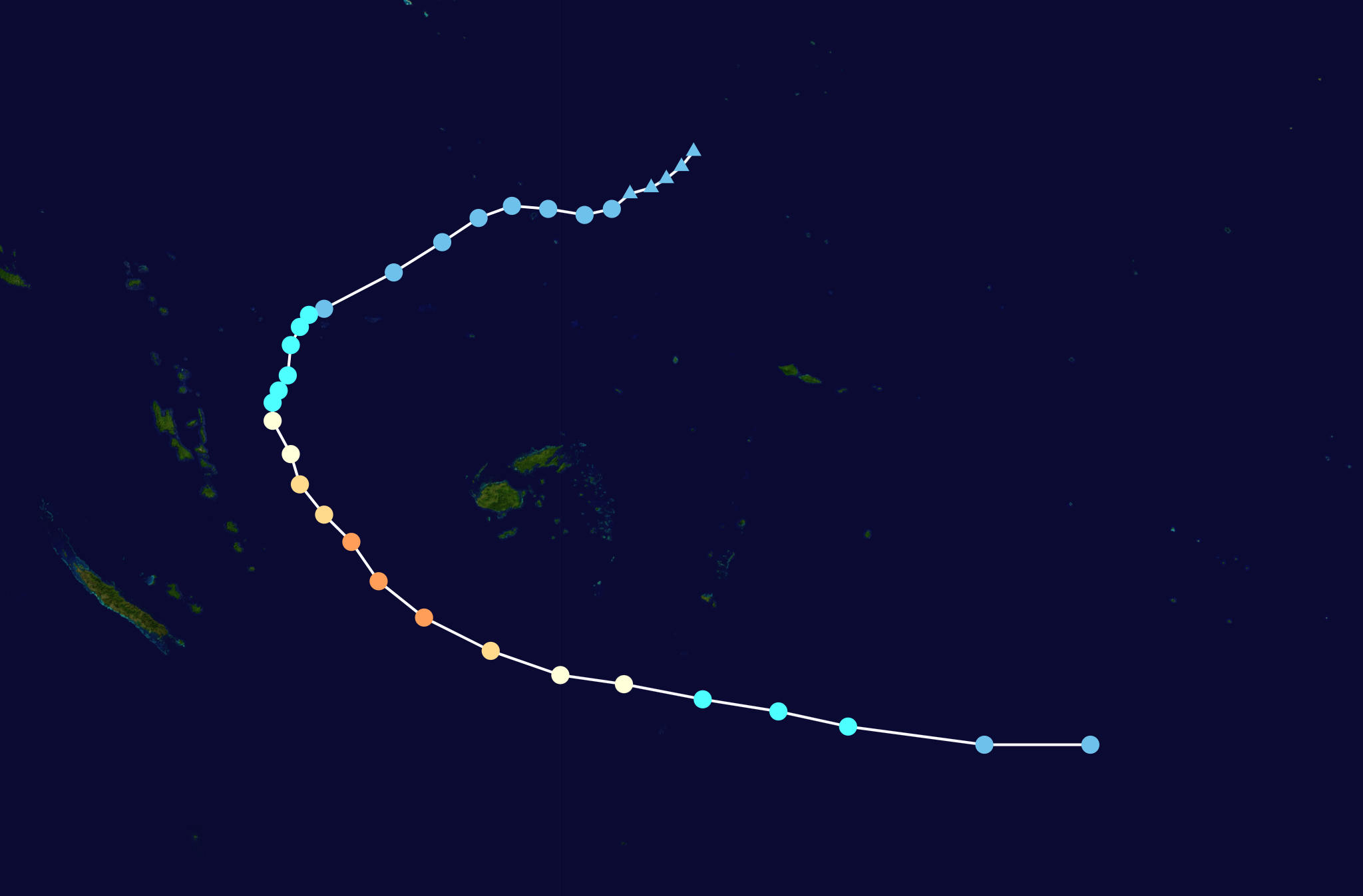
- Duration: March 19 – March 27
- Peak intensity: 155 km/h (100 mph) (10-min); 955 hPa (mbar)

Severe Tropical Cyclone Tomas existed from March 19 to March 27.

=== Tropical Cyclone Usha ===
- Category 2 tropical cyclone (Australian scale)
- Tropical storm (SSHWS)
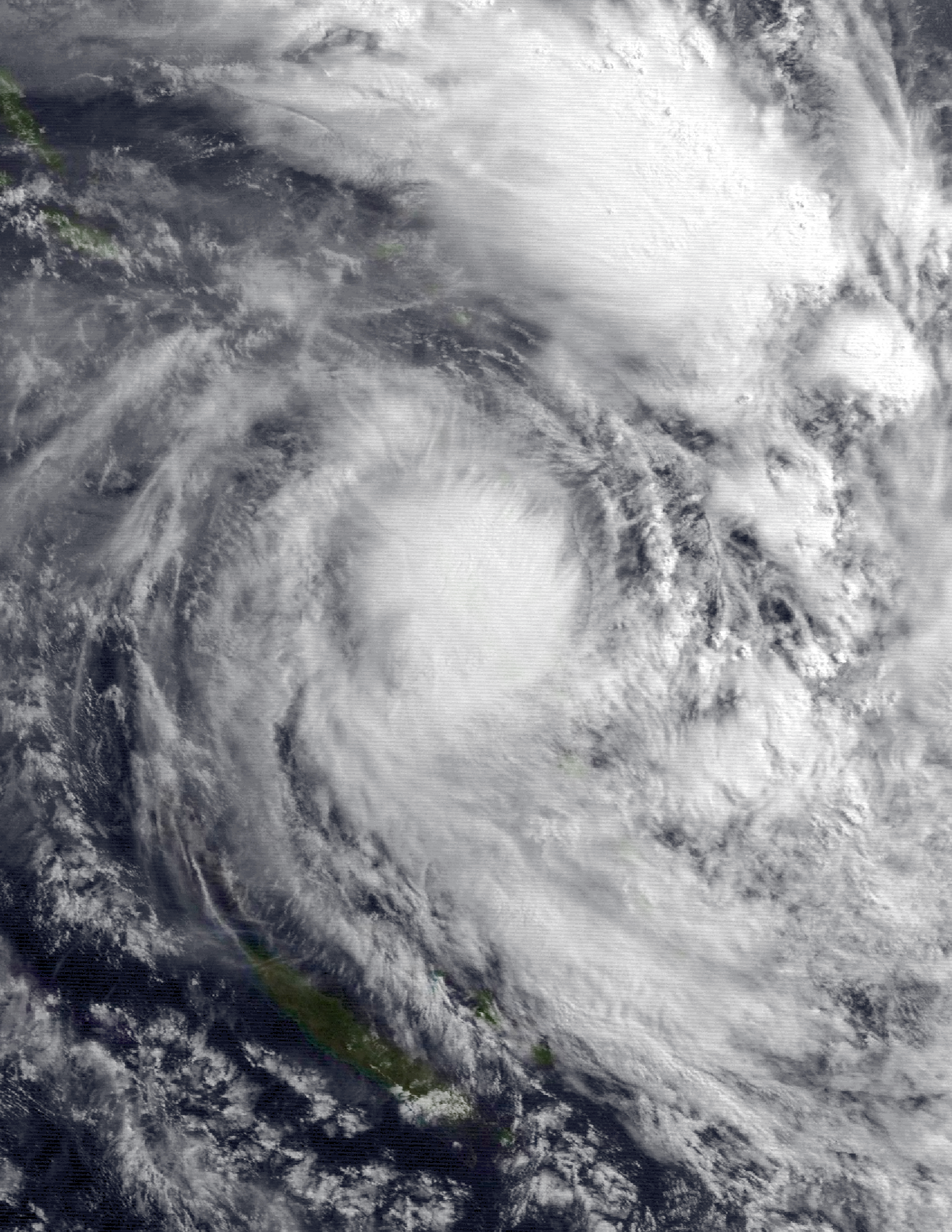
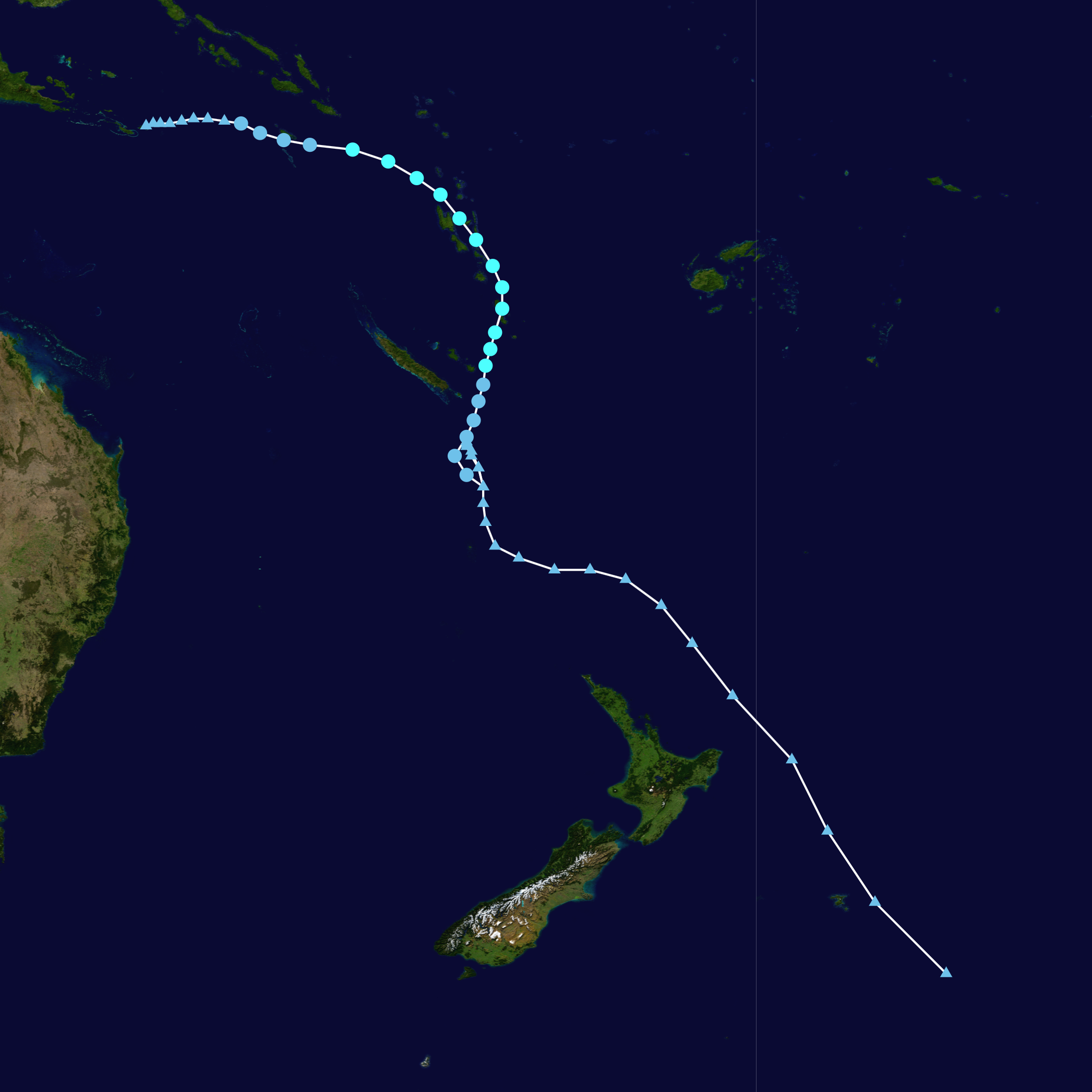
- Duration: March 25 – April 4
- Peak intensity: 95 km/h (60 mph) (10-min); 980 hPa (mbar)

Late on March 24, the newly developed Tropical Cyclone Usha, moved into the South Pacific basin as a category 1 tropical cyclone.

=== Tropical Depression 29P ===
- Tropical depression (SSHWS)
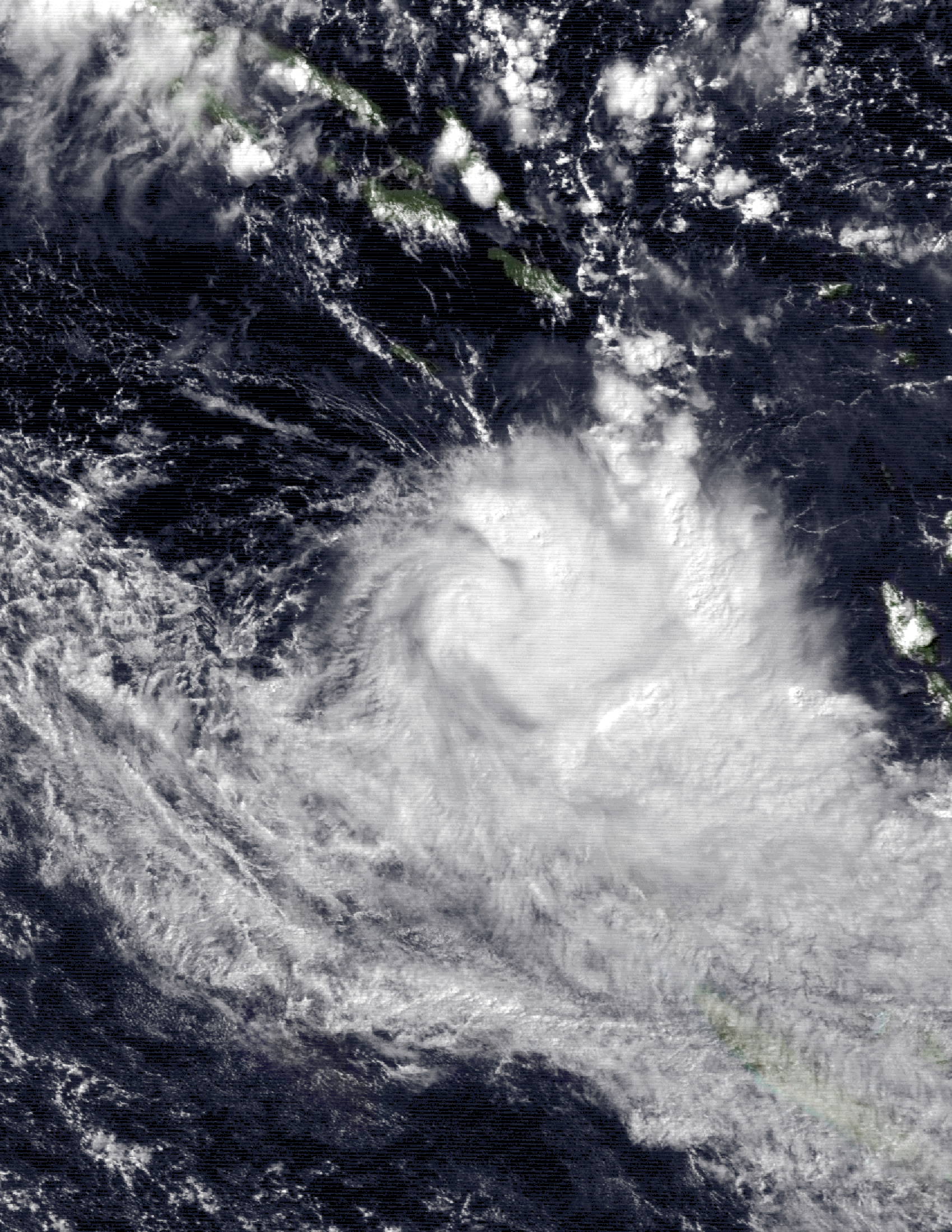
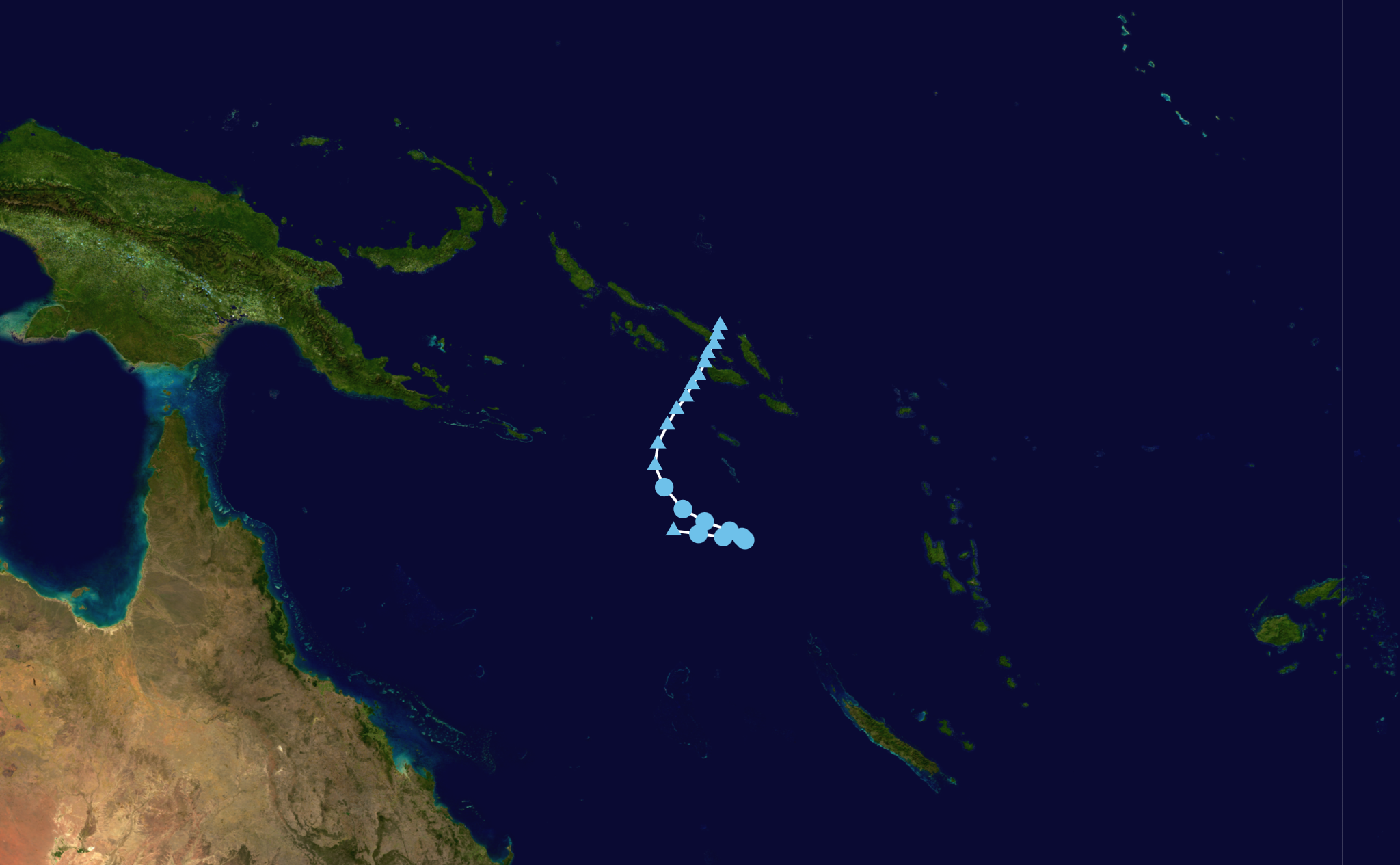
- Duration: April 24 (Entered basin) – April 25 (Exited basin)
- Peak intensity: 55 km/h (35 mph) (1-min); 1000 hPa (mbar)

On April 20, the JTWC started to monitor an area of low pressure that located over the Solomon Islands about 155 km (95 mi) to the north of Honiara. During that day the disturbance moved towards the southeast and passed over several of the Solomon Islands, before emerging into the Australian basin. Over the next couple of days the disturbance gradually developed further while moving towards the southwest before re-curving and moving southeastwards. On April 24, as it moved back into the South Pacific basin, the JTWC initiated advisories on the disturbance, designating it as Tropical Cyclone 29P, with peak windspeeds equivalent to a tropical depression. As the system was classified, it recurved again and started to move slowly towards the northwest, and started to feel the effects of a high amount of vertical windshear. As a result of the windshear, the center became exposed and displaced from the deep convection before the JTWC issued their final advisory on April 25 as 29P weakened into an area of low pressure, before dissipating later that day about 600 km (375 mi) to the southwest of Honiara.

== Season effects ==
This table lists all the storms that developed in the South Pacific basin during the 1993–94 season. It includes their intensity on the Australian Tropical cyclone intensity scale, duration, name, areas affected, deaths, and damages.

1993–94 South Pacific cyclone season
Name	Dates active	Peak intensity			Areas affected	Damage (US$)	Deaths	Refs
Name	Dates active	Category	Wind speed	Pressure	Areas affected	Damage (US$)	Deaths	Refs
Rewa	December 28, 1993 – January 10, 1994	Category 3 severe tropical cyclone	150 km/h (90 mph)	950 hPa (28.05 inHg)	Australia, New Caledonia; New Zealand, Papua New Guinea; Solomon Islands, Vanuatu	Unknown	22	
07P	January 6 – 8	Tropical depression	Unknown	Unknown		Unknown	Unknown	
Sarah	January 18 – February 4	Category 4 severe tropical cyclone	165 km/h (105 mph)	945 hPa (27.91 inHg)		Unknown	Unknown	
Theodore	February 26 – March 3	Category 4 severe tropical cyclone	185 km/h (115 mph)	933 hPa (27.55 inHg)		Unknown	Unknown	
Tomas	March 19 – 27	Category 3 severe tropical cyclone	155 km/h (100 mph)	955 hPa (28.20 inHg)		Unknown	Unknown	
Usha	March 22 – April 4	Category 2 tropical cyclone	95 km/h (60 mph)	980 hPa (28.94 inHg)		Unknown	Unknown	
29P	April 24 – 25	Tropical depression	Unknown	Unknown		Unknown	Unknown	
Season aggregates
7 systems	December 28, 1993 – April 25, 1994		185 km/h (115 mph)	933 hPa (27.55 inHg)			22	

== See also ==
- Atlantic hurricane seasons: 1993, 1994
- Pacific hurricane seasons: 1993, 1994
- Pacific typhoon seasons: 1993, 1994
- North Indian Ocean cyclone seasons: 1993, 1994
