= Gudluru =

- Mandal
- Interactive map of Gudluru
- Location in Andhra Pradesh, India
- Coordinates: 15°04′N 79°54′E
- Country: India
- State: Andhra Pradesh
- District: Prakasam
- Mandal: Gudluru

Languages
  - Official: Telugu
- Time zone: UTC+5:30 (IST)
- PIN: 523281
- Vehicle registration: AP–27
- Lok Sabha: Nellore
- Vidhan Sabha: Kandukuru

Gudluru is a Mandal in Prakasam district of the Indian state of Andhra Pradesh. It is the mandal headquarters of Gudluru mandal.

== Politics ==
Kandukur is an Assembly Constituency in Andhra Pradesh.
