= 1993–94 South-West Indian Ocean cyclone season =

Cyclone season in the Southwest Indian Ocean

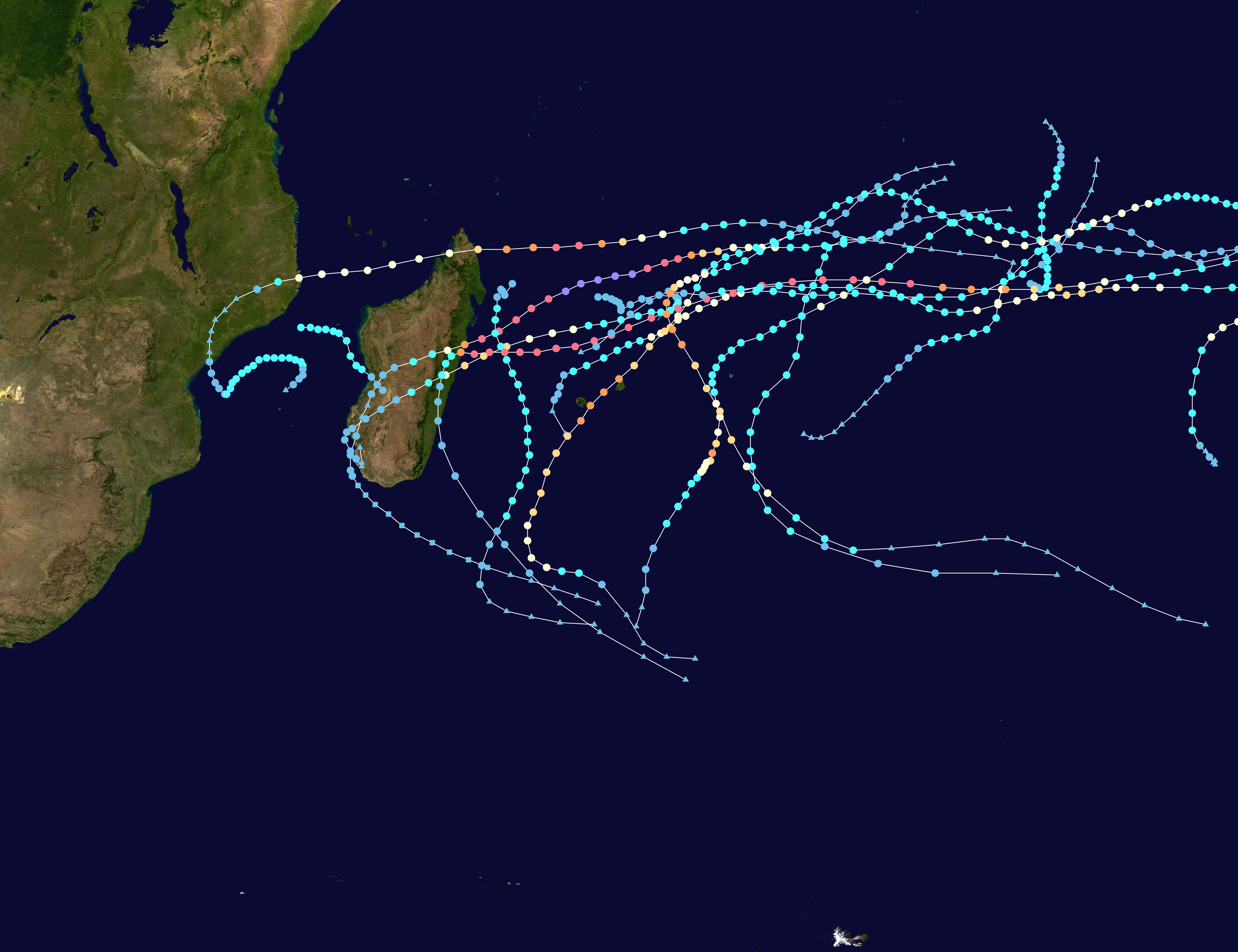
- Season summary map

Seasonal boundaries
- First system formed: November 9, 1993
- Last system dissipated: April 14, 1994

Strongest storm
- Name: Geralda
  - Maximum winds: 205 km/h (125 mph) (10-minute sustained)
  - Lowest pressure: 905 hPa (mbar)

Seasonal statistics
- Total disturbances: 18
- Total depressions: 18 (record high)
- Total storms: 14
- Tropical cyclones: 8
- Intense tropical cyclones: 4
- Total fatalities: 484 total
- Total damage: $165 million (1994 USD)

Related articles
- 1993–94 Australian region cyclone season; 1993–94 South Pacific cyclone season

The 1993–94 South-West Indian Ocean cyclone season was the most active season in the basin since the start of reliable satellite coverage in 1967, until the record was surpassed 25 years later in the 2018–19 South-West Indian Ocean cyclone season. Activity lasted from mid-November, when Moderate Tropical Storm Alexina formed, until mid-April, when Tropical Cyclone Odille became extratropical. Four tropical cyclones – Daisy, Geralda, Litanne, and Nadia – struck eastern Madagascar, of which Geralda was the costliest and deadliest. With gusts as strong as 350 km/h (215 mph) accompanied by heavy rainfall, Geralda destroyed more than 40,000 homes and left 356,000 people homeless. Geralda killed 231 people and caused more than $10 million in damage. (Note: All damage totals are in 1994 United States dollars unless otherwise noted.) Cyclone Nadia was the second deadliest cyclone, having killed 12 people in northern Madagascar and later severely damaging portions of northeastern Mozambique, killing about 240 people and leaving $20 million in damage in the latter country. In February, Cyclone Hollanda struck Mauritius near peak intensity, causing $135 million in damage and two deaths.

Three storms – Alexina, Bettina, and Cecilia – formed in late 1993, of which Cecilia affected land; it produced heavy rainfall in Réunion while dissipating. Cyclone Daisy was the first storm in 1994, which struck Madagascar twice and affected many areas that were later struck by Geralda. One cyclone – Farah – previously formed in the Australian basin as Tropical Cyclone Pearl before crossing into the south-west Indian Ocean. Tropical Cyclone Ivy threatened Mauritius just days after Hollanda struck, and Intense Tropical Cyclone Litanne in March was the third of the season to hit northeastern Madagascar. The basin is defined as the area west of 90°E and south of the Equator in the Indian Ocean, which includes the waters around Madagascar westward to the east coast of Africa. Tropical cyclones in this basin are monitored by the Regional Specialised Meteorological Centre in Réunion (MFR), (Note: Météo-France is the official Regional Specialized Meteorological Center for the south-west Indian Ocean, based out of Réunion.) as well as by the Joint Typhoon Warning Center (JTWC). (Note: The Joint Typhoon Warning Center is a joint United States Navy – United States Air Force task force that issues tropical cyclone warnings for the region.)

== Seasonal summary ==
On July 1, 1993, the Météo-France office in Réunion (MFR) became a Regional Specialized Meteorological Center, as designated by the World Meteorological Organization. In the year, MFR tracked tropical cyclones south of the equator from the coast of Africa to 90° E. Due to the high activity during the season, MFR issued twice the number of advisories as in the previous year. Every six hours in the season, the agency issued bulletins when there was a tropical system within the basin. Storms were named by advisory centers in Mauritius and Madagascar.

During the year, there were neutral El Niño Southern Oscillation conditions, and for several months there was a well-established monsoon trough that extended into the Australian basin. The average storm duration was 9 days, although the final storm, Odille, lasted 16 days, a record at the time. The season was the second-most active on record since the start of reliable satellite coverage in 1967. Due to the high number of storms, there were a record number of cyclone days – days in which a tropical cyclone is active – as well as intense tropical cyclone days, with a total of 27 days for the latter. The next seasons to approach either total were the 2001–02 and 2018–19 seasons. MFR had an alphabetically prepared list of names for the season, the last seven of which went unused: Pemma, Ronna, Sydna, Telia, Valentina, Williana, and Yvanna.

In addition to the named storms, MFR tracked three other tropical systems that did not last for more than 24 hours. The first, designated Tropical Depression C1, formed on December 5 near the eastern portion of the basin, and quickly dissipated. The other two, designated E1 and H1, formed in January and February, respectively. In addition, Tropical Cyclone Willy crossed into the basin as a dissipating tropical depression, for which MFR did not issue advisories.

== Systems ==
=== Moderate Tropical Storm Alexina ===
- Moderate tropical storm (MFR)
- Tropical storm (SSHWS)
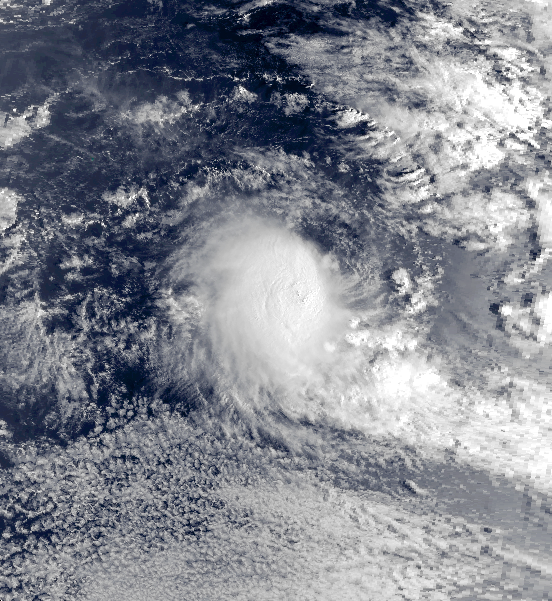
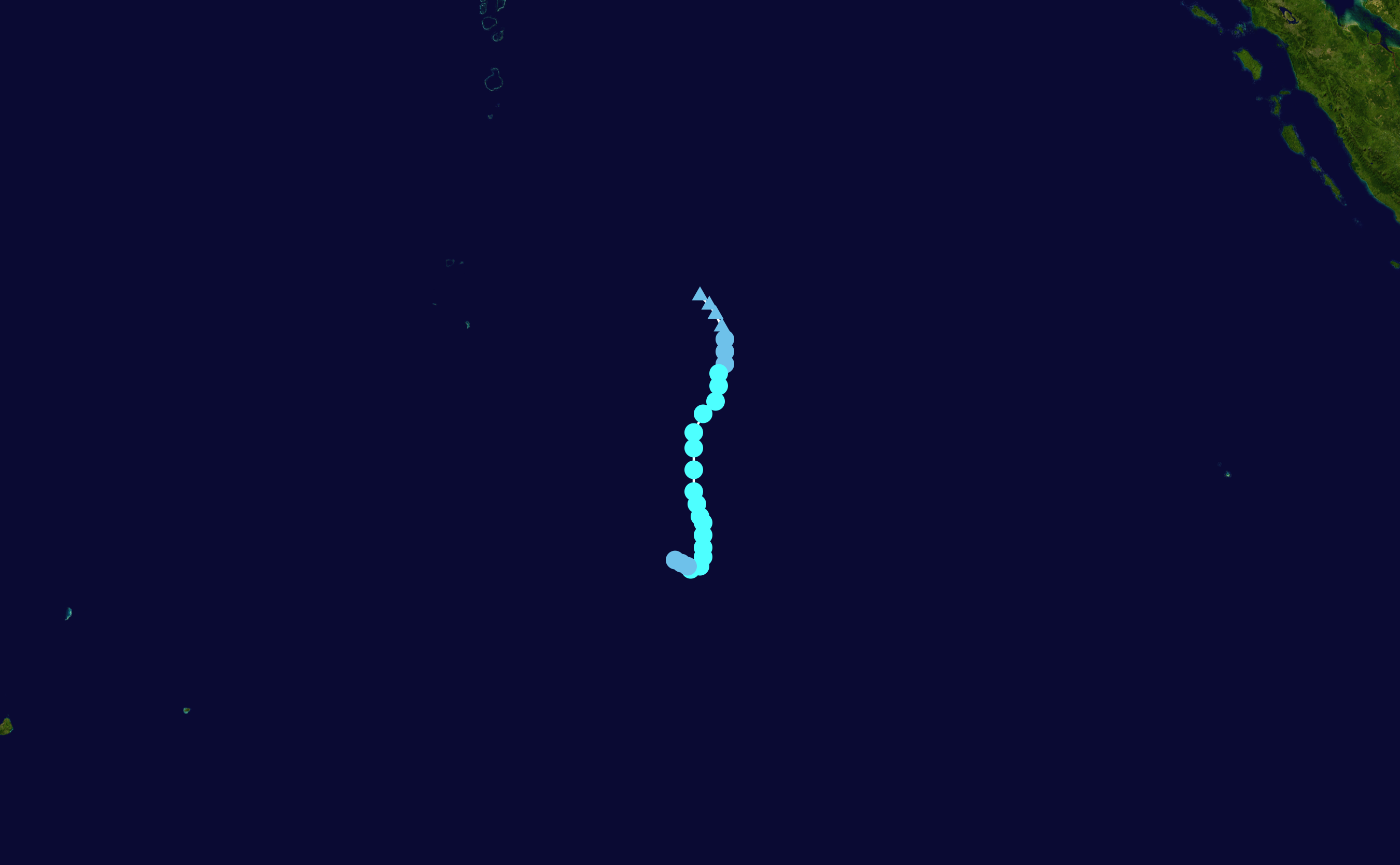
- Duration: November 9 – November 14
- Peak intensity: 85 km/h (50 mph) (10-min); 982 hPa (mbar)

The first storm of the season formed from a low-pressure area with associated convection that persisted east of the Chagos Archipelago on November 7. It formed in tandem with two tropical depressions in the North Indian Ocean. The JTWC began tracking the system that day, although MFR did not follow suit until two days later. On November 10, the depression intensified into Moderate Tropical Storm Alexina, having developed a central dense overcast. A narrow eastward-moving trough caused the storm to move generally southward for its entire duration, the only such storm of the season to maintain a largely north–south track. On November 11, MFR estimated that Alexina attained peak winds of 85 km/h (55 mph), while JTWC estimated peak winds of 110 km/h (70 mph). (Note: Wind estimates from Météo-France and most other basins throughout the world are sustained over 10 minutes, while estimates from the United States-based Joint Typhoon Warning Center are sustained over 1 minute. 10 minute winds are about 1.14 times the amount of 1 minute winds.) Increased wind shear disrupted the convection, while a building ridge to the south caused its movement to slow. By late on November 12, Alexina weakened to tropical depression status, which subsequently drifted to the west until dissipating on November 16.

=== Severe Tropical Storm Bettina ===
- Severe tropical storm (MFR)
- Category 1 tropical cyclone (SSHWS)
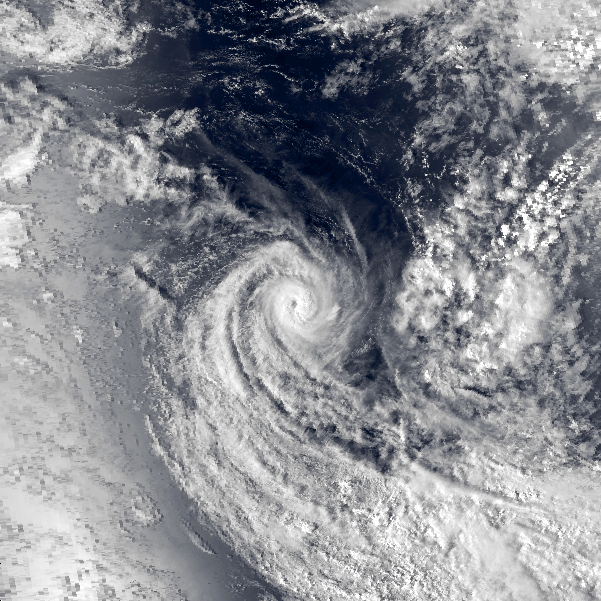
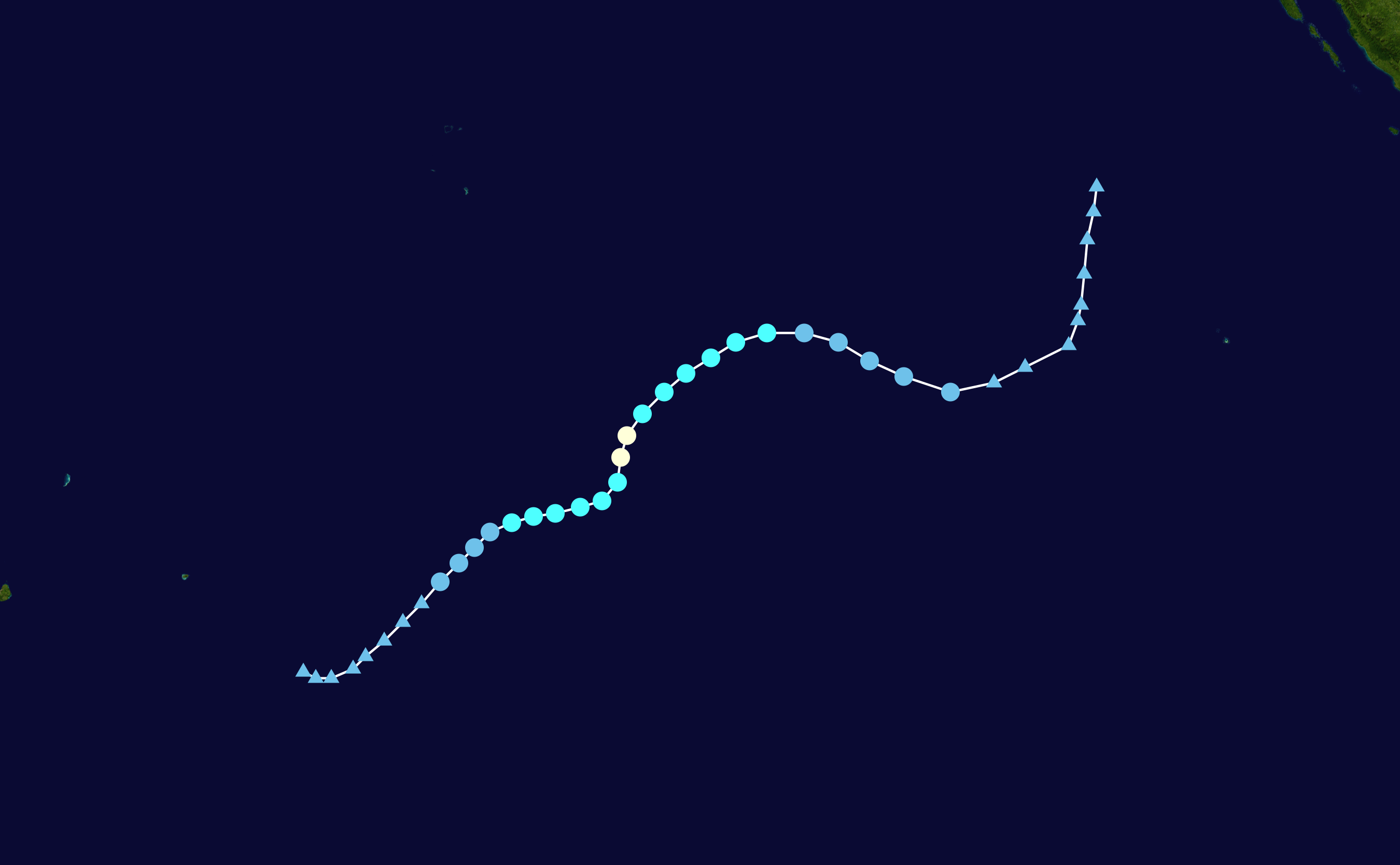
- Duration: November 25 – December 2
- Peak intensity: 110 km/h (70 mph) (10-min); 970 hPa (mbar)

On November 23, the Intertropical Convergence Zone spawned a low-pressure area in the far northeastern portion of the basin, which the JTWC assessed as having formed in the western Australian basin. Located north of a large ridge, the system tracked southwestward initially before turning more to the west. Late on November 25, MFR began classifying the system as a tropical disturbance, and within 12 hours the agency upgraded it to Moderate Tropical Storm Bettina. On November 26, the storm turned to the southwest. The next day, Bettina developed an eye feature, and MFR upgraded it to a severe tropical storm, with winds of 110 km/h (70 mph). By comparison, the JTWC estimated winds of 100 km/h (60 mph). After wind shear increased sharply on November 28, the storm quickly weakened and within 24 hours was devoid of convection. Bettina again turned to the west as a tropical depression, moving around the large ridge. It briefly re-intensified on December 1, but dissipated on December 3 south of the Mascarene Islands.

=== Severe Tropical Storm Cecilia ===
- Severe tropical storm (MFR)
- Category 2 tropical cyclone (SSHWS)
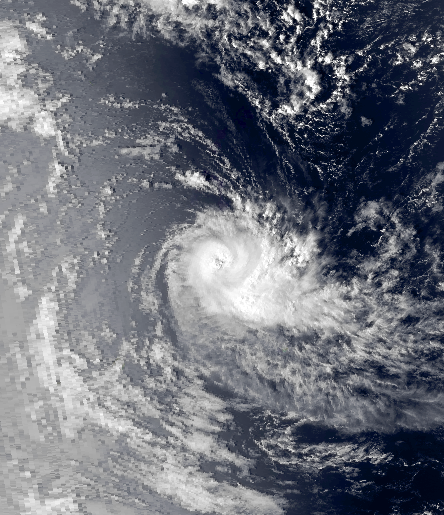
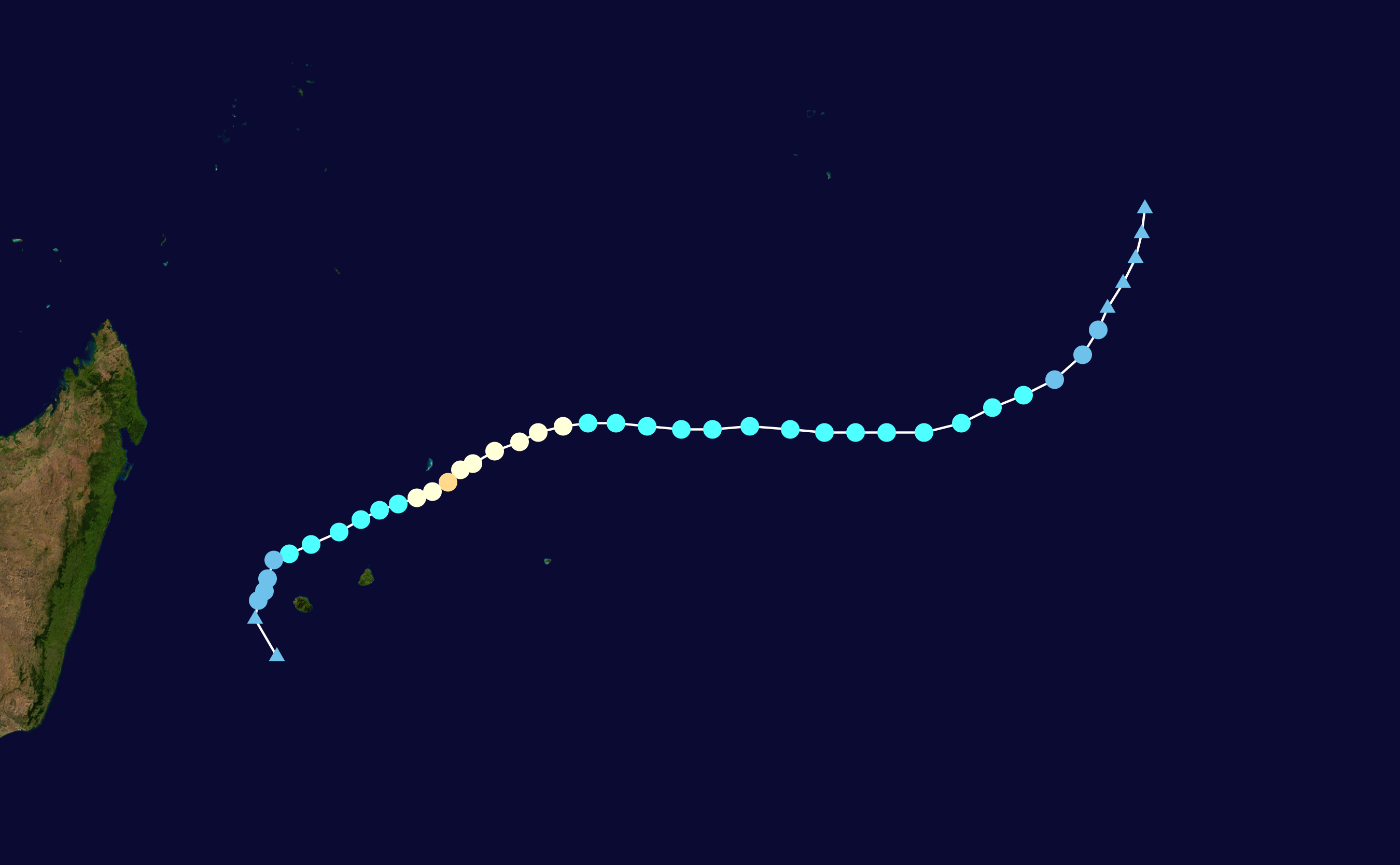
- Duration: December 12 – December 21
- Peak intensity: 100 km/h (65 mph) (10-min); 972 hPa (mbar)

The Intertropical Convergence Zone spawned a tropical disturbance in the northeast portion of the basin on December 9. Initially the system did not develop, and MFR did not classify it until December 12. The next day, the depression intensified into a moderate tropical storm, and was named Cecilia. The strengthening was short-lived, and the storm quickly weakened to tropical depression status on December 14. After initially tracking to the southwest, Cecilia turned to the west on December 15 due to a strengthening ridge to the south, by which time it had restrengthened and developed a central dense overcast. On December 17, MFR upgraded the storm toa severe tropical storm, with winds of 100 km/h (60 mph) according to MFR. The next day, JTWC estimated that Cecilia intensified to reach winds of 160 km/h (100 mph). While near peak intensity, the storm turned to the southwest and began weakening after wind shear increased. By December 19, Cecilia had weakened to tropical depression status, and dissipated on December 21 after passing west of Réunion. An approaching trough had caused thunderstorms to reform in the eastern portion of the circulation, which resulted in heavy rainfall over Mauritius and later Réunion. In the latter island, the rainfall was heaviest in the northern portion, peaking at 475 mm (18.7 in) in Salazie in 24 hours; the same station recorded 286 mm (11.3 in) in a 6-hour period, including 47 mm (1.9 in) in just 30 minutes.

=== Tropical Cyclone Daisy ===
- Tropical cyclone (MFR)
- Category 2 tropical cyclone (SSHWS)
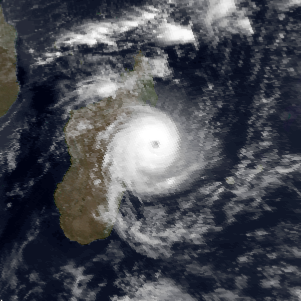
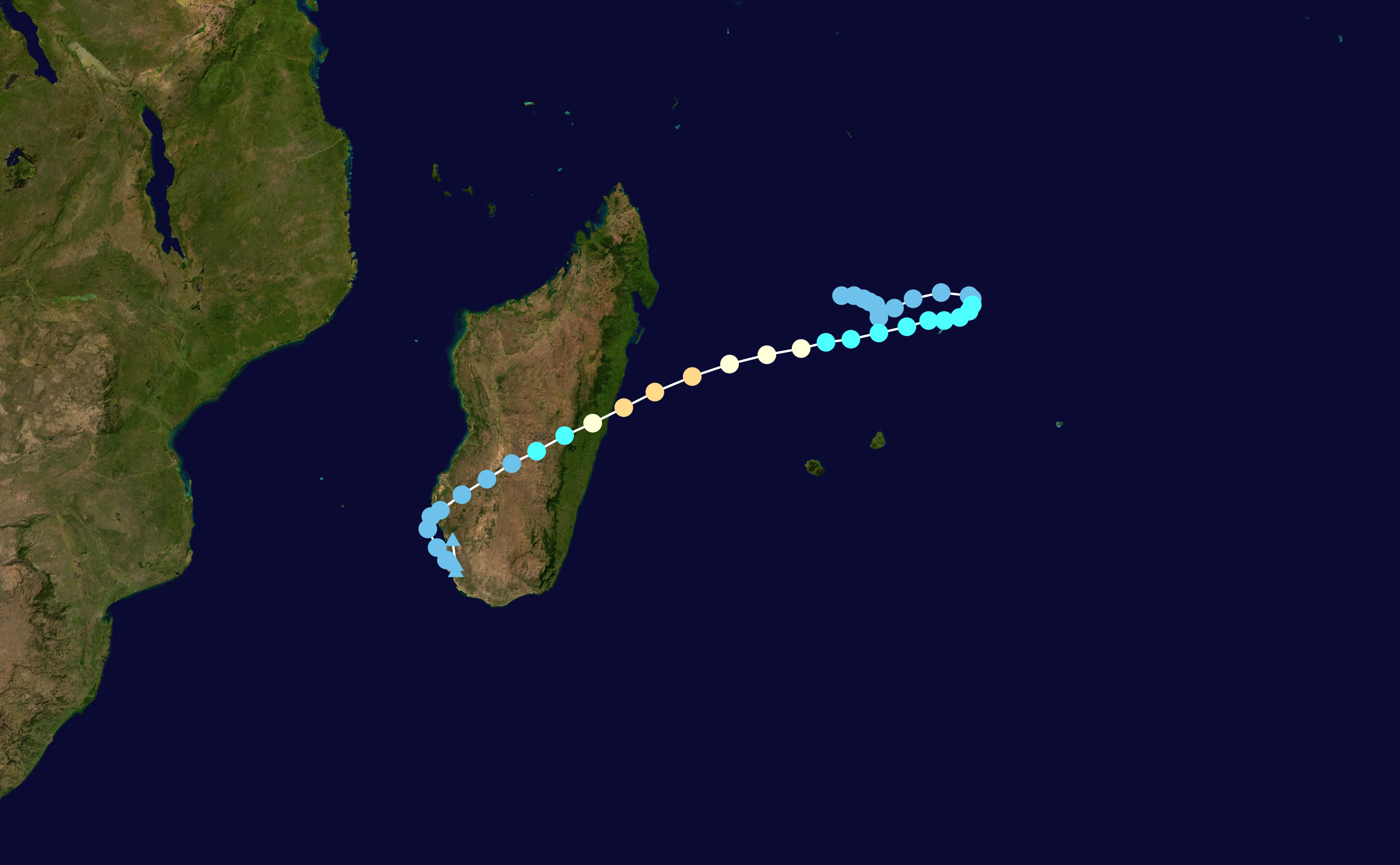
- Duration: January 7 – January 16
- Peak intensity: 155 km/h (100 mph) (10-min); 935 hPa (mbar)

In early January, the Intertropical Convergence Zone persisted off the northeast coast of Madagascar, spawning a low-pressure area on January 6. The next day, the system developed into a tropical disturbance, which initially moved to the east due to high pressure to the south. On January 8, the system developed a curved area of convection, which later developed into a central dense overcast. Initially located within a broader trough, the disturbance gradually became better defined as a distinct system. On January 10, it intensified into Moderate Tropical Storm Daisy while passing near St. Brandon. A trough to the south weakened the ridge, causing the storm to turn to the southwest toward Madagascar. Daisy intensified into a severe tropical storm on January 11, and later into a tropical cyclone the next day. At around 1200 UTC on January 13, the cyclone made landfall near Brickaville in eastern Madagascar, with MFR estimating winds of about 155 km/h (95 mph); at around the same time, the JTWC estimated peak winds of 175 km/h (110 mph). At landfall, Daisy had a symmetrical cloud pattern 400 km (250 mi) in diameter. The high mountains of Madagascar caused the storm to quickly weaken, although it emerged into the Mozambique Channel as a tropical disturbance on January 15. That day, a trough turned Daisy to the south, and it briefly re-intensified into a tropical storm over warm waters. On January 16, Daisy made a second landfall in southern Madagascar and dissipated the next day.

When Daisy struck Madagascar, it produced 200 km/h (120 mph) wind gusts on Île Sainte-Marie, along with heavy rainfall. The storm destroyed over 90 schools and government buildings and damaged the road network. Madagascar's capital Antananarivo was flooded, forcing 6,000 people to evacuate. Many of the same areas affected by Daisy were later affected by Geralda in February.

=== Severe Tropical Storm Edmea ===
- Severe tropical storm (MFR)
- Tropical storm (SSHWS)
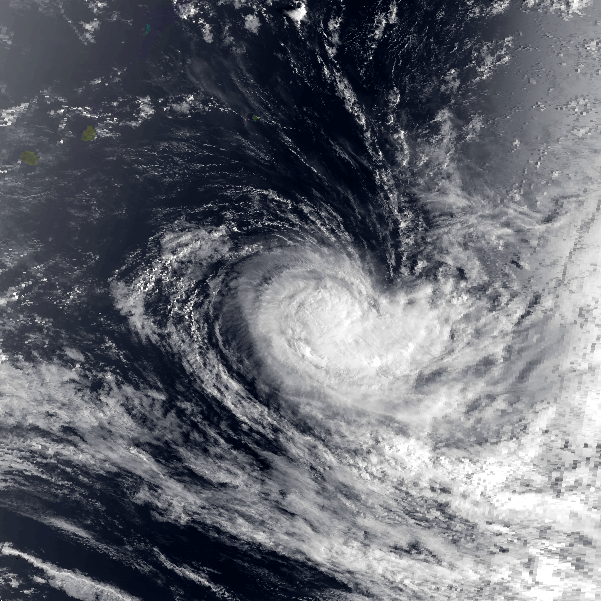
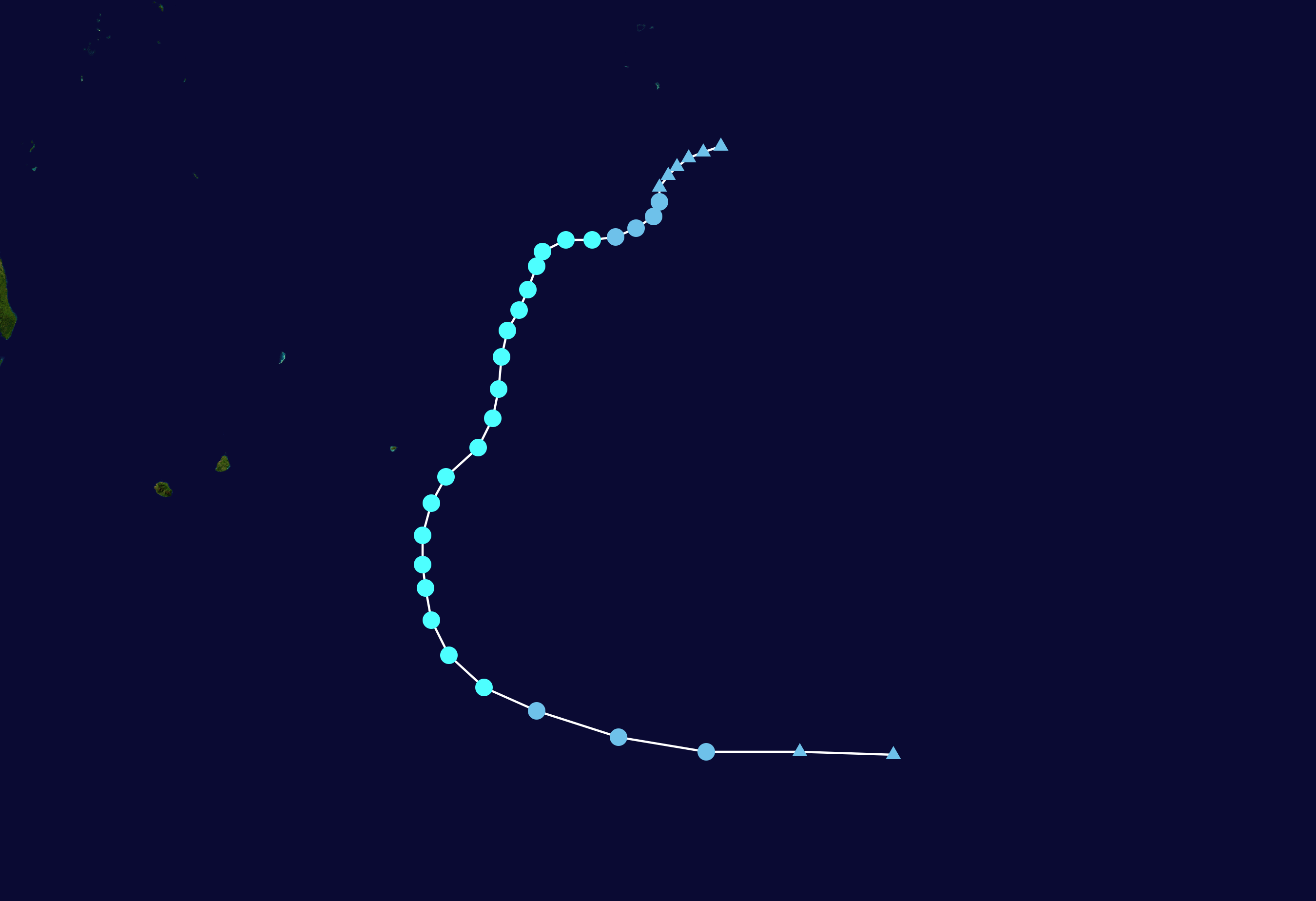
- Duration: January 13 – January 19
- Peak intensity: 95 km/h (60 mph) (10-min); 976 hPa (mbar)

The Intertropical Convergence Zone spawned a low-pressure area south of the Chagos archipelago on January 12, and developed a large area of convection the next day. On January 13, MFR began classifying the system as a tropical depression, and following further intensification, the agency upgraded the depression to Moderate Tropical Storm Edmea later that day. With a ridge to the southeast, the storm tracked generally to the southwest. Its initial strengthening rate slowed until Edmea reached peak winds of 95 km/h (60 mph) on January 17. An approaching trough turned the storm to the south away from any landmasses, and also increased shear which caused weakening. Turning to the southeast on January 18, Edmea became extratropical the following day and was later absorbed by the trough.

=== Tropical Cyclone Pearl–Farah ===
- Tropical cyclone (MFR)
- Category 1 tropical cyclone (SSHWS)
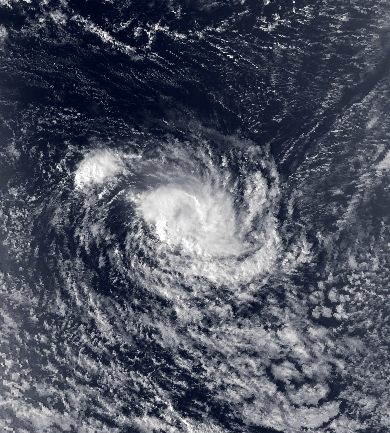
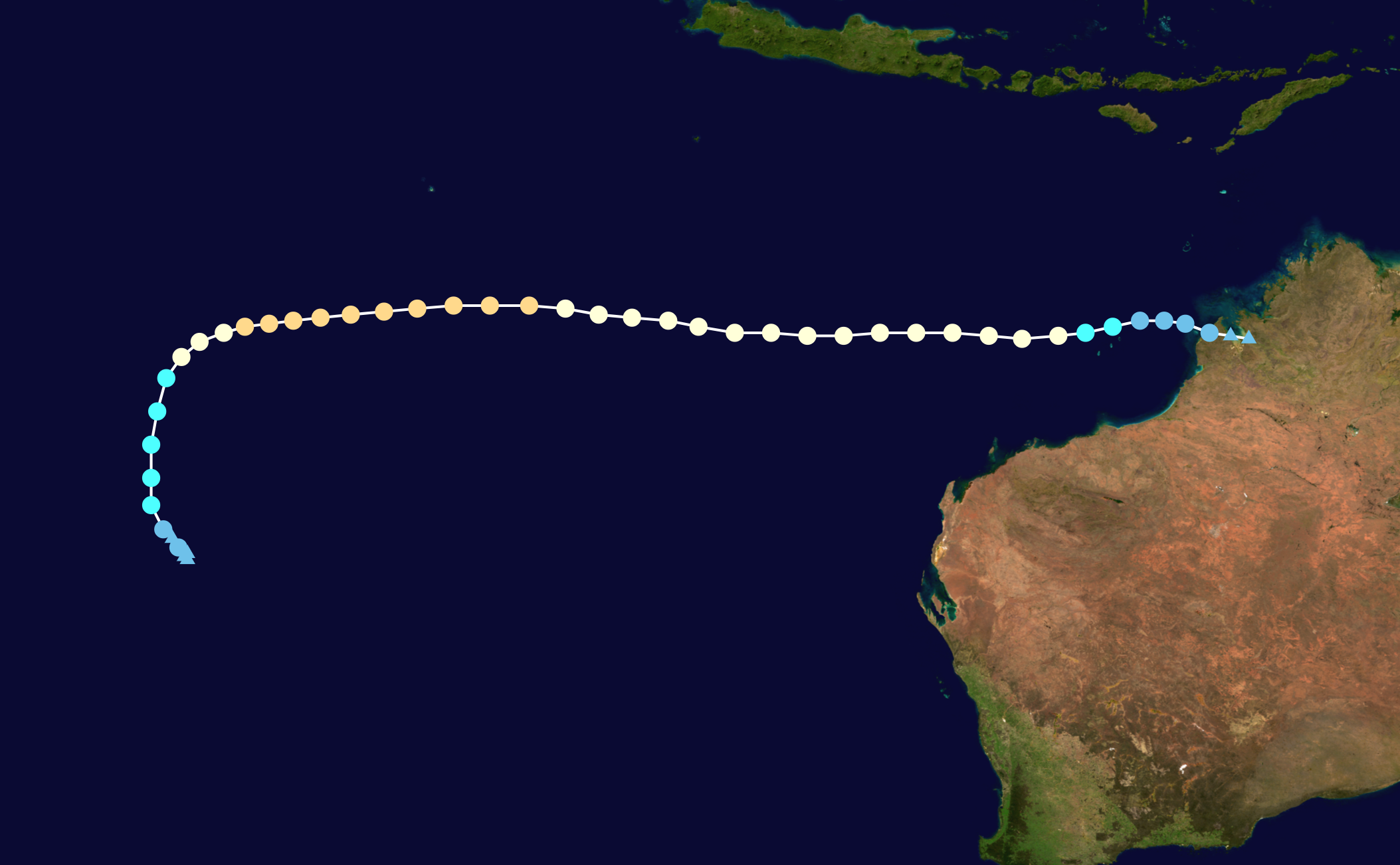
- Duration: January 18 (entered basin) – January 21
- Peak intensity: 120 km/h (75 mph) (10-min); 960 hPa (mbar)

On January 11, a tropical low formed northwest of Broome, Western Australia. It was named Pearl a few hours later by the Bureau of Meteorology. The cyclone continued westward and reached a peak intensity of 155 km/h (95 mph). As the system moved west of 90°E, MFR took over warning responsibility on January 18 and renamed the cyclone Farah. At that time, MFR estimated winds of about 120 km/h (75 mph). After having moved westward due to a ridge to the south, Farah turned to the south upon entering the basin due to an approaching trough, which previously absorbed Edmea. High wind shear caused rapid weakening, and by January 19, there was little remaining convection. The next day, Farah weakened to tropical depression status and turned to the southeast. The ridge built behind the trough, causing the depression to stall and drift northward, and by February 22, Farah dissipated.

=== Intense Tropical Cyclone Geralda ===
- Intense tropical cyclone (MFR)
- Category 5 tropical cyclone (SSHWS)
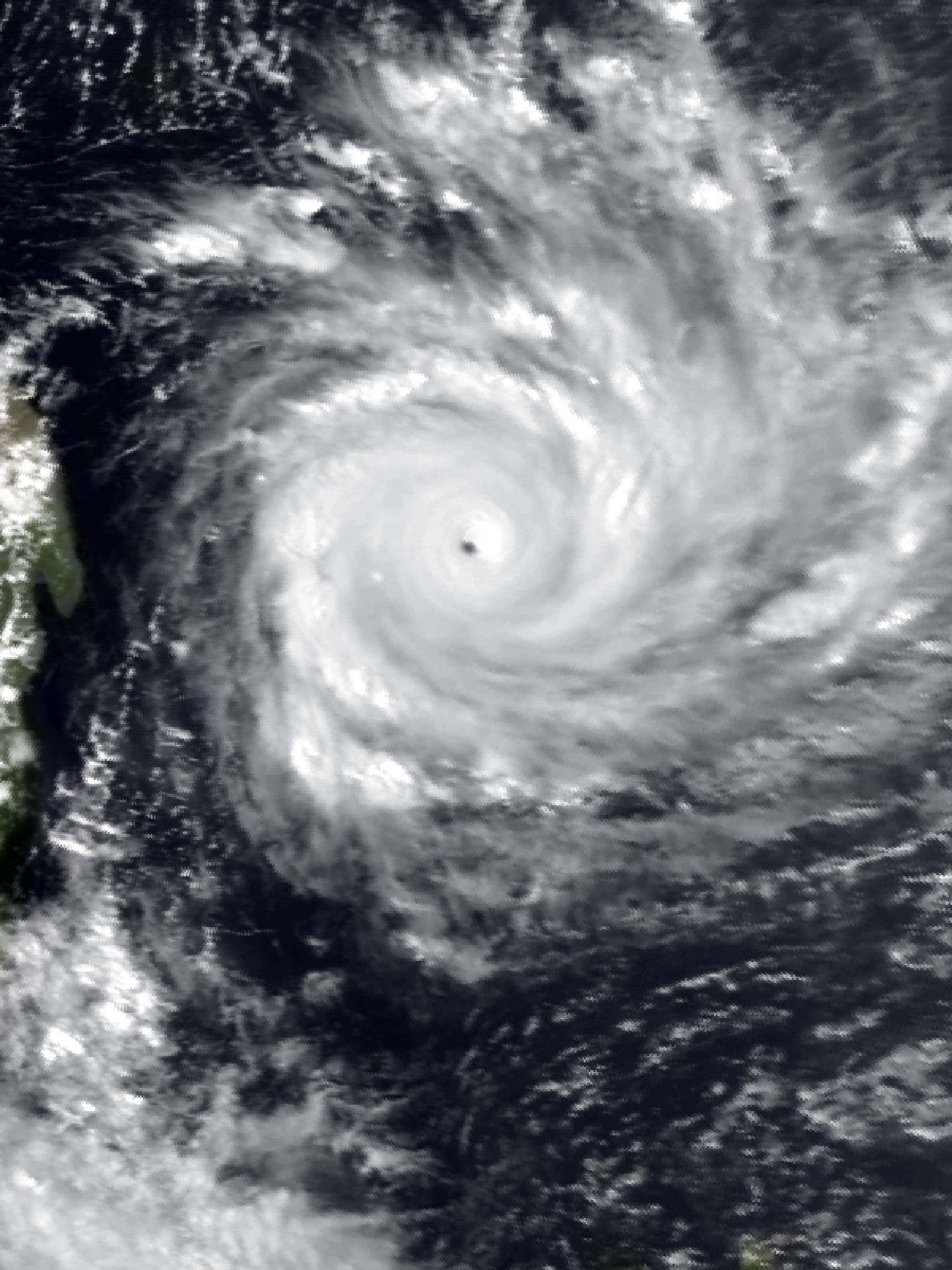
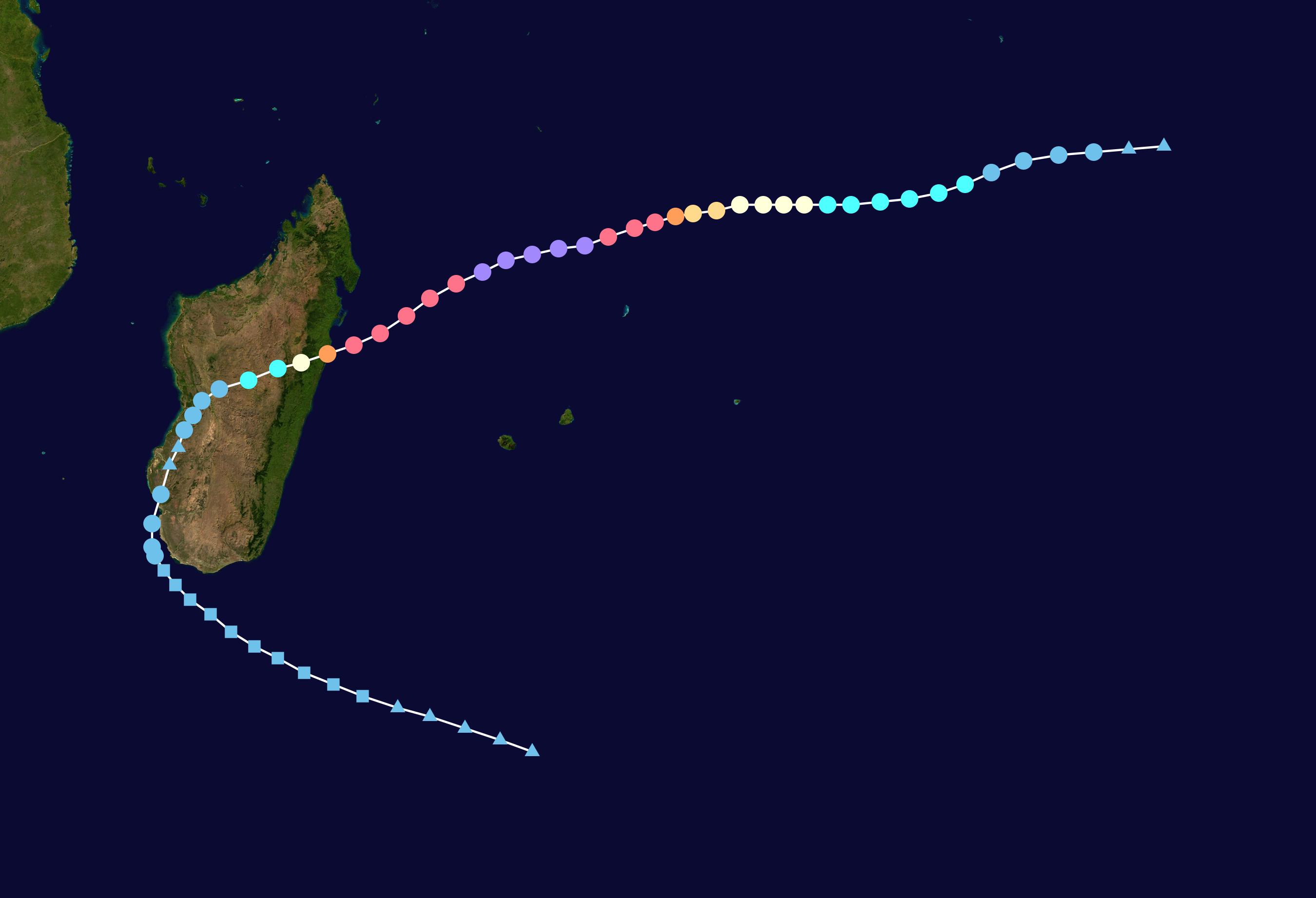
- Duration: January 26 – February 8
- Peak intensity: 205 km/h (125 mph) (10-min); 905 hPa (mbar)

Cyclone Geralda originated from an area of low pressure from the monsoon trough on January 25. Over the following few days, the depression underwent gradual intensification, and MFR estimated peak winds of 200 km/h (125 mph) on January 31. Cyclone Geralda made landfall near Toamasina, Madagascar after weakening from its peak intensity. Within hours of moving onshore, the system had substantially weakened, and by February 5, Geralda had degenerated into a land depression. After briefly emerging into the Mozambique Channel, Geralda crossed southern Madagascar, and it became extratropical on February 8. Geralda was the strongest of the season and the strongest to hit Madagascar since a cyclone in March 1927.

Geralda was the second cyclone in as many months to strike eastern Madagascar, after Daisy in January. Geralda produced wind gusts as strong as 350 km/h (220 mph), which were the highest worldwide for several decades. The cyclone also dropped heavy rainfall that caused flooding, particularly in valleys. About 80% of the city of Toamasina was destroyed, including most schools, homes, and churches. The cyclone heavily damaged roads and rail lines, which later disrupted relief efforts. In the capital Antananarivo, Geralda killed 43 people after flooding many houses. Overall, more than 40,000 homes were destroyed, leaving 356,000 people homeless. Nationwide, the cyclone killed 231 people and caused over $10 million in damage. Relief work in the storm's aftermath was hampered by lack of coordination, and the Malagasy military were deployed to help storm victims. Few stocks were pre-positioned, causing food prices to rise greatly. Several countries and departments of the United Nations donated money or supplies to the country.

=== Tropical Cyclone Hollanda ===
- Tropical cyclone (MFR)
- Category 3 tropical cyclone (SSHWS)
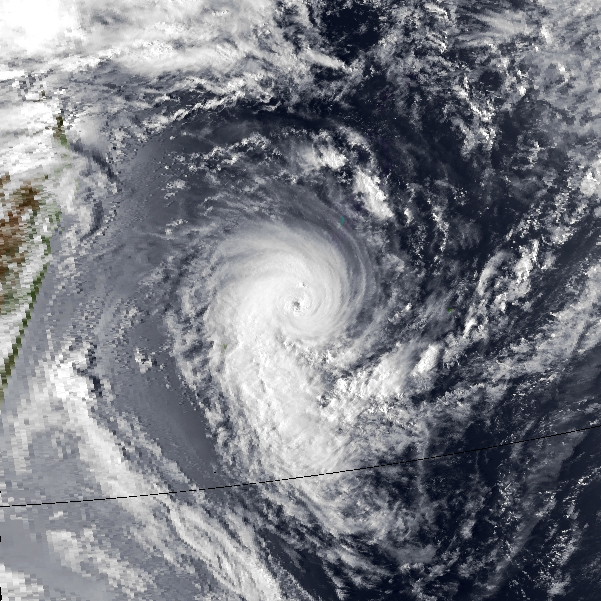
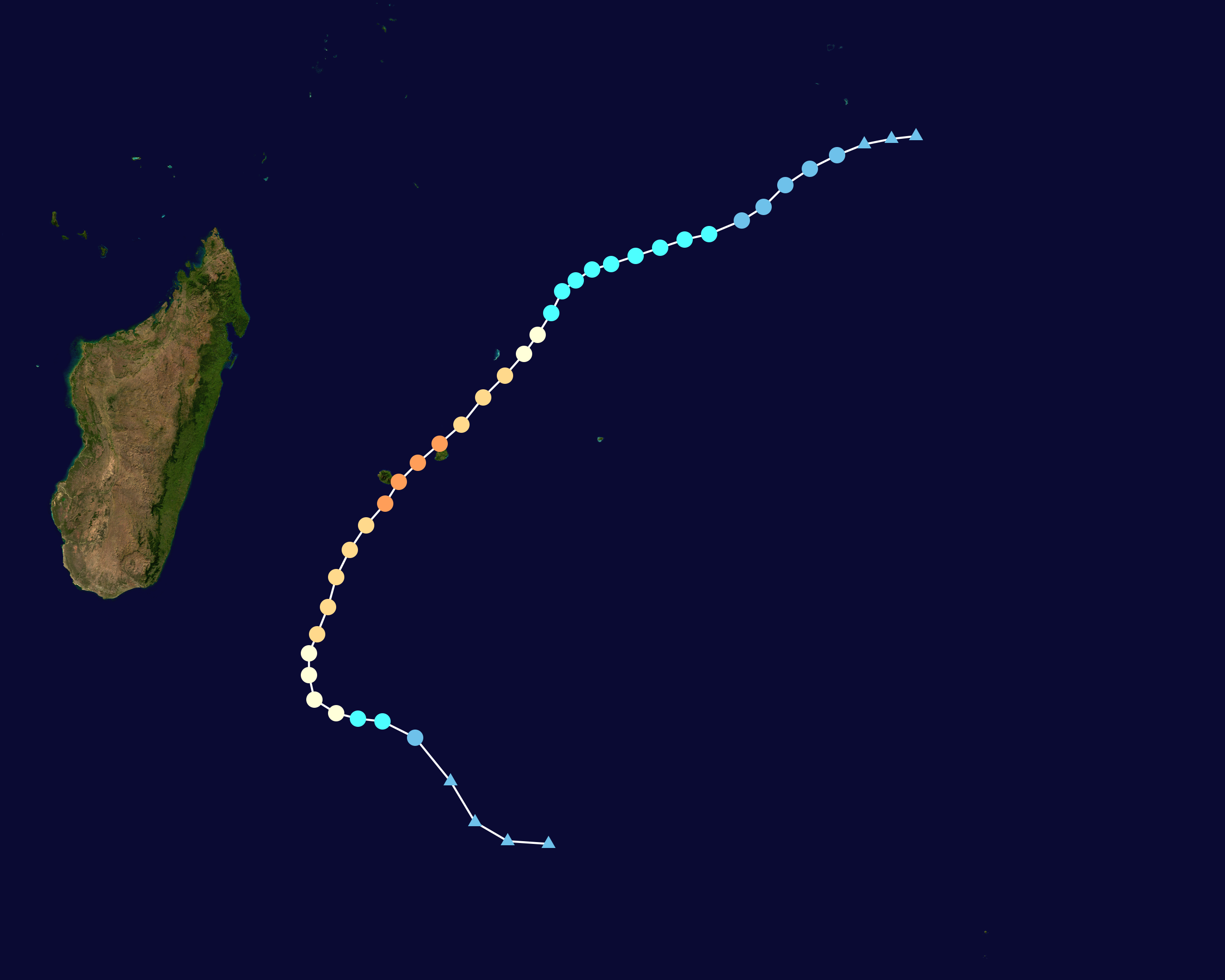
- Duration: February 6 – February 14
- Peak intensity: 155 km/h (100 mph) (10-min); 940 hPa (mbar)

The monsoon trough remained active, spawning a tropical depression on February 6 south of the Chagos archipelago. The system moved generally southwestward for much of its duration, steered by a ridge to the south. On February 8, the depression intensified into Moderate Tropical Storm Hollanda, and the next day became a tropical cyclone, developing a small 20 km (12 mi) eye. On February 10, the cyclone attained peak winds of 155 km/h (95 mph), as assessed by MFR, and that day Hollanda struck the island of Mauritius at that intensity. Subsequently, the cyclone weakened while turning more to the south. A trough turned Hollanda to the east on February 13, and the next day the storm became extratropical.

While moving across the island, Hollanda produced wind gusts of 216 km/h (134 mph) in the capital city of Port Louis, while heavy rainfall reached 711 mm (28.0 in) in Mare aux Vacoas. The cyclone destroyed or severely damaged 450 houses, which left at least 1,500 people homeless. High winds downed about 30% of the island's trees and left half of the island without power. Hollanda also caused severe crop damage; nearly half of the island's sugar crop was destroyed, which necessitated for the government to assist in replanting efforts. Hollanda killed two people and caused $135 million in damage on Mauritius. The highest rainfall from the cyclone fell on Réunion, with 741 mm (29.2 in) recorded at Grand Coude. On that island, there was also damage to crops and power lines.

=== Tropical Cyclone Ivy ===
- Tropical cyclone (MFR)
- Category 3 tropical cyclone (SSHWS)
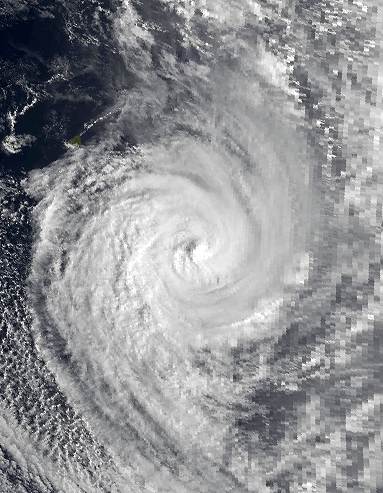
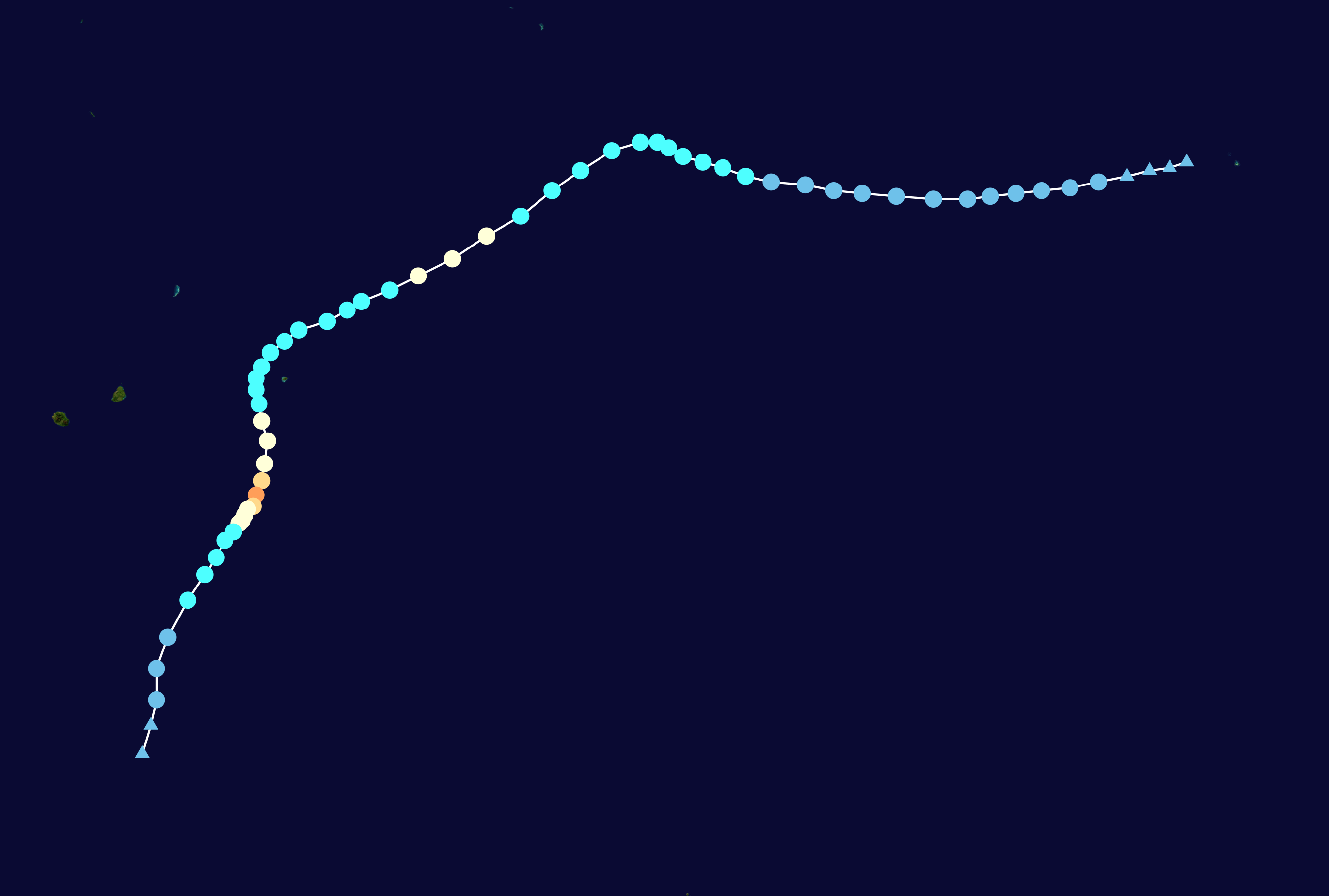
- Duration: February 8 – February 20
- Peak intensity: 140 km/h (85 mph) (10-min); 950 hPa (mbar)

The origins of Cyclone Ivy were from a disturbance that the JTWC began tracking on February 6 in the Australian basin. The next day, the disturbance crossed into the south-west Indian Ocean, and on February 8, MFR began tracking it. A ridge to the south imparted a general westward movement. With the convection gradually organizing, MFR upgraded the system to a tropical depression on February 9 and later to Moderate Tropical Storm Ivy the next day. A trough associated with the stronger Cyclone Hollanda turned the storm to the southwest. Although the JTWC upgraded Ivy to the equivalent of a minimal hurricane on February 12, MFR estimated the storm weakened slightly, due to wind shear obscuring the center. By the following day, convection reorganized and the storm re-strengthened, first to severe tropical storm status on February 15 and then to tropical cyclone status the next day. Around that time, Ivy approached within 100 km (62 mi) of Rodrigues, where gusts reached 130 km/h (81 mph), and there was some damage.

After passing near Rodrigues, Ivy strengthened further, developing a well-defined eye 50 km (31 mi) in diameter, while turning more to the south due to a trough associated with the remnants of Hollanda. The JTWC estimated peak winds of 185 km/h (115 mph) on February 17, around the same time MFR estimated peak winds of 140 km/h (85 mph). The strengthening ridge caused Ivy to slow its motion to the southwest while increased shear caused weakening. On February 18, the cyclone weakened to tropical storm status, and by the next day was downgraded to tropical depression status. On February 20, Ivy became extratropical, which dissipated the subsequent day.

=== Tropical Depression Julita ===
- Tropical depression (MFR)
- Tropical storm (SSHWS)
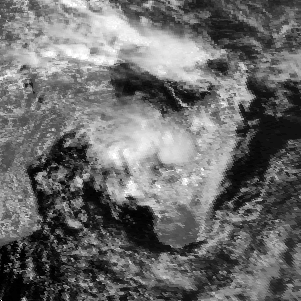
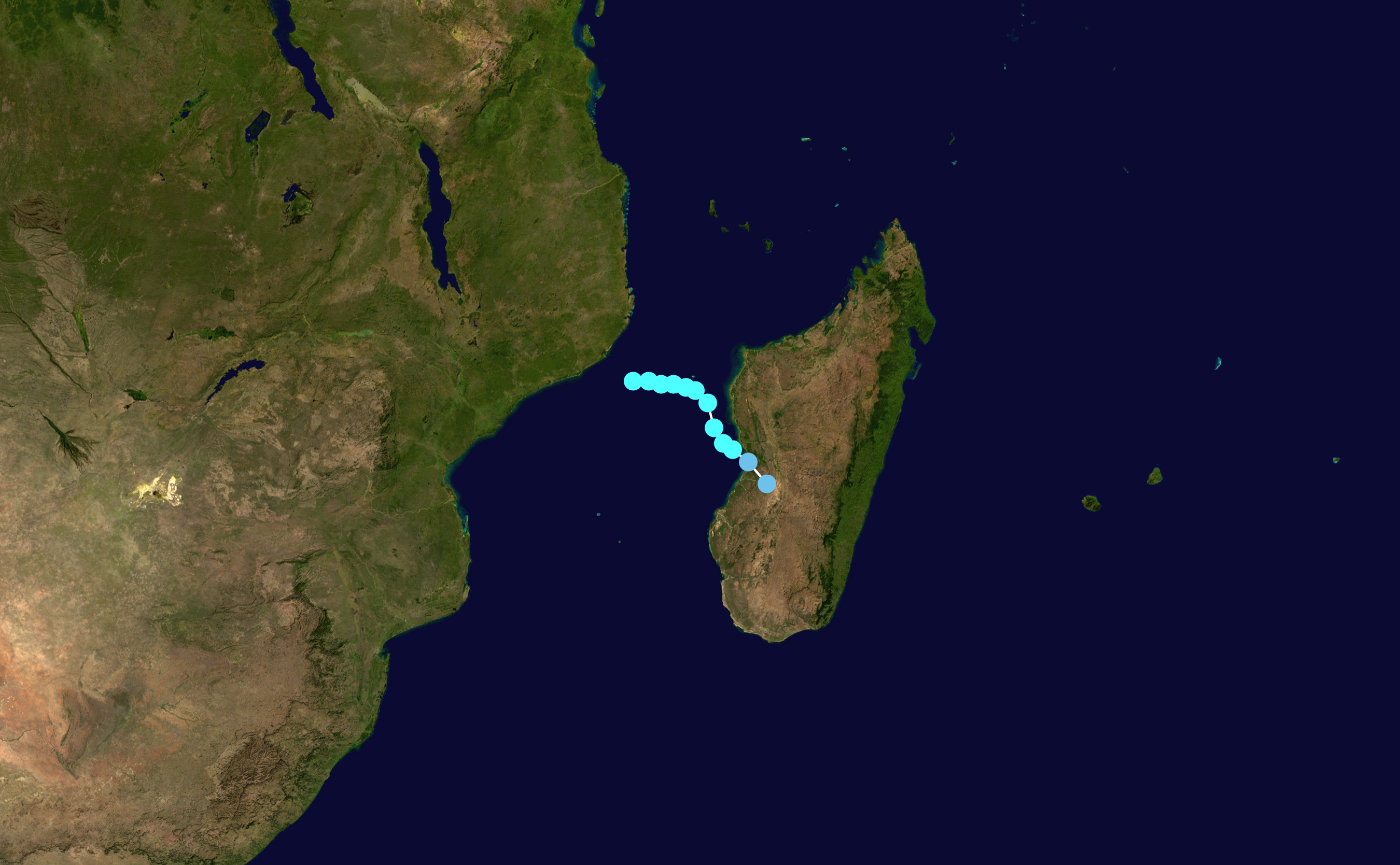
- Duration: February 15 – February 18
- Peak intensity: 55 km/h (35 mph) (10-min); 995 hPa (mbar)

In the middle of February, the monsoon trough persisted over the Mozambique Channel and spawned a circulation on February 15 to the west of Juan de Nova Island. Thunderstorms increased around the circulation, and later that day, MFR began tracking the system as a tropical depression. Despite warm air temperatures, the system did not develop a warm core like most tropical cyclones as it moved to the southeast. On February 16, the storm passed about 40 km (25 mi) south of Juan de Nova Island, producing gusts of 75 km/h (47 mph). The next day, MFR estimated peak winds of about 55 km/h (35 mph); despite that the system did not intensify into a moderate tropical storm, the Meteorological Service of Madagascar named the depression Julita on February 17. It weakened as its structure deteriorated, and Julita moved ashore in western Madagascar near Morondava early on February 18. It dissipated shortly thereafter. Julita affected areas impacted by earlier cyclones Daisy and Geralda, but caused minimal damage and no deaths.

=== Moderate Tropical Storm Kelvina ===
- Moderate tropical storm (MFR)
- Tropical storm (SSHWS)
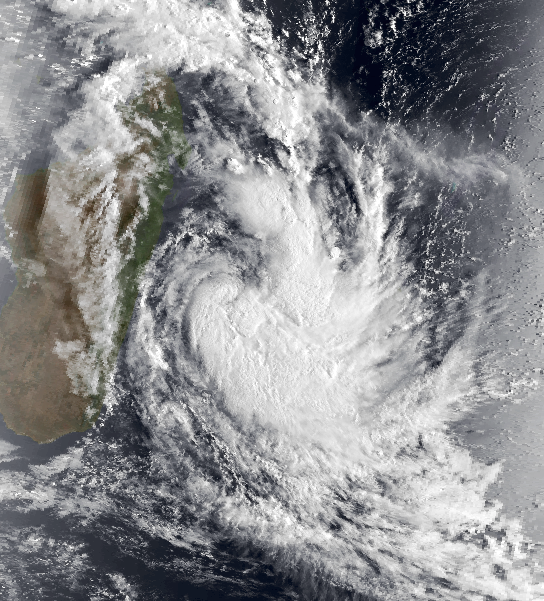
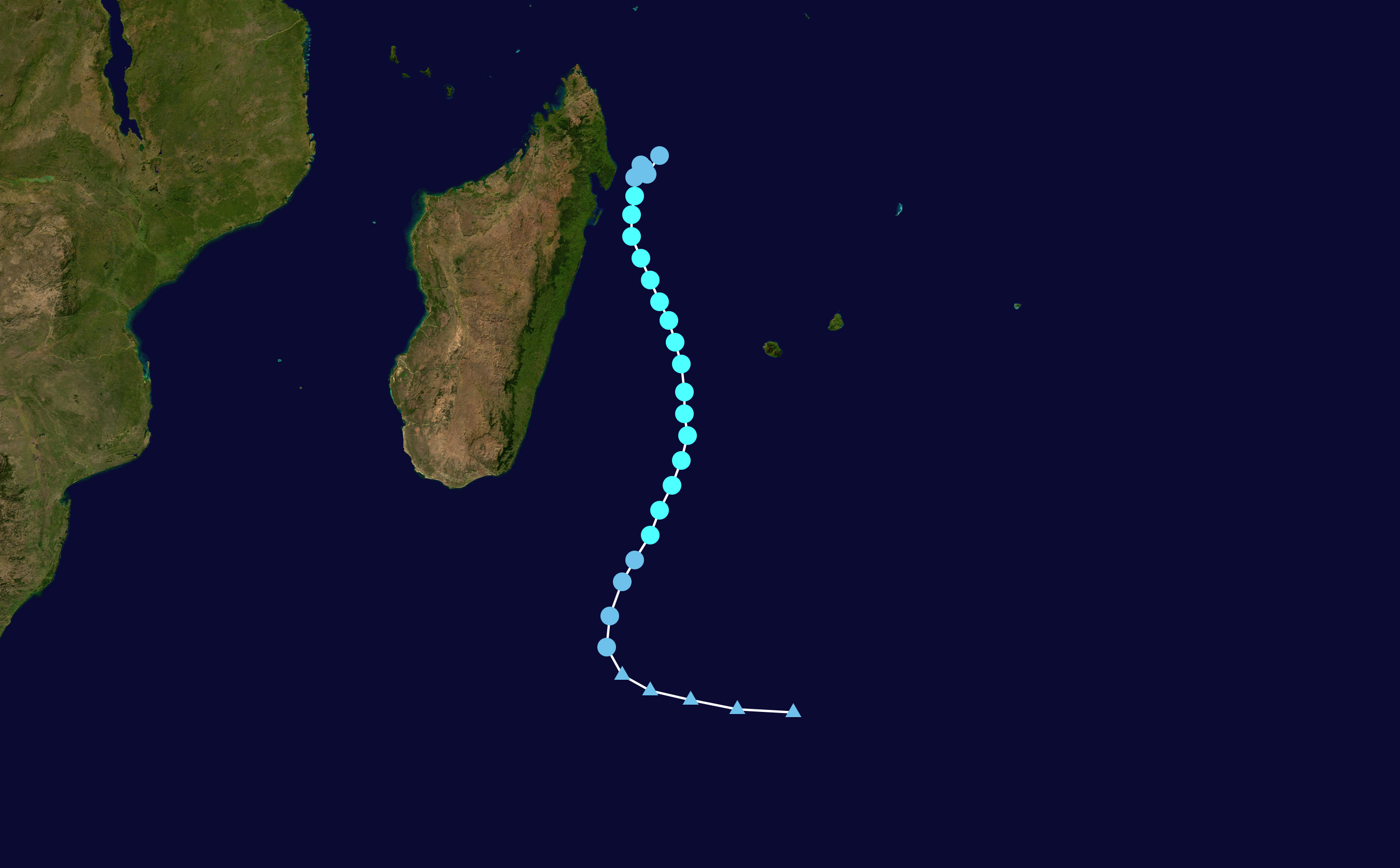
- Duration: March 5 – March 11
- Peak intensity: 85 km/h (50 mph) (10-min); 985 hPa (mbar)

The Intertropical Convergence Zone spawned an area of convection on March 5 off the northeast coast of Madagascar, which was classified by both JTWC and MFR that day. A large anticyclone to the east caused the system to track generally to the south, and initially wind shear prevented significant strengthening. On March 6, the Meteorological Service of Madagascar named the system Kelvina, although the depression did not intensify into a moderate tropical storm until the next day. At around that time, the convection became better organized, extending away from the center to the east. On March 8, MFR estimated peak winds of about 85 km/h (55 mph), although further strengthening was prevented by an increase in wind shear. On March 10, Kelvina passed near Reunion, where it dropped heavy rainfall. The next day, the storm became extratropical, which continued south for several days, eventually degenerating into a trough that influenced the tracks of subsequent tropical cyclones.

=== Intense Tropical Cyclone Litanne ===
- Intense tropical cyclone (MFR)
- Category 4 tropical cyclone (SSHWS)
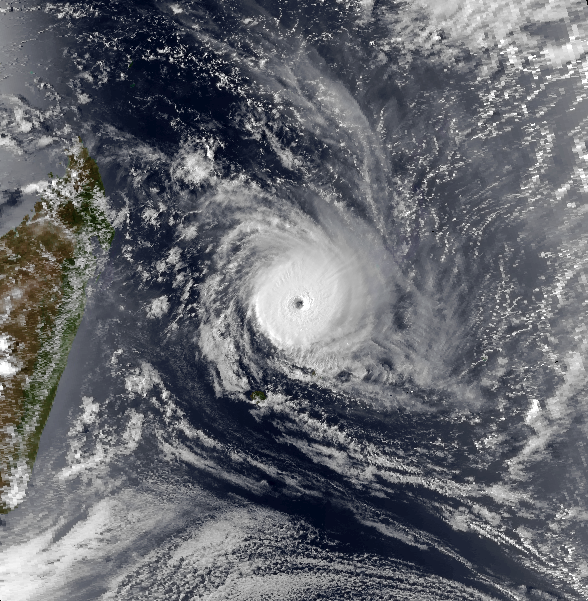
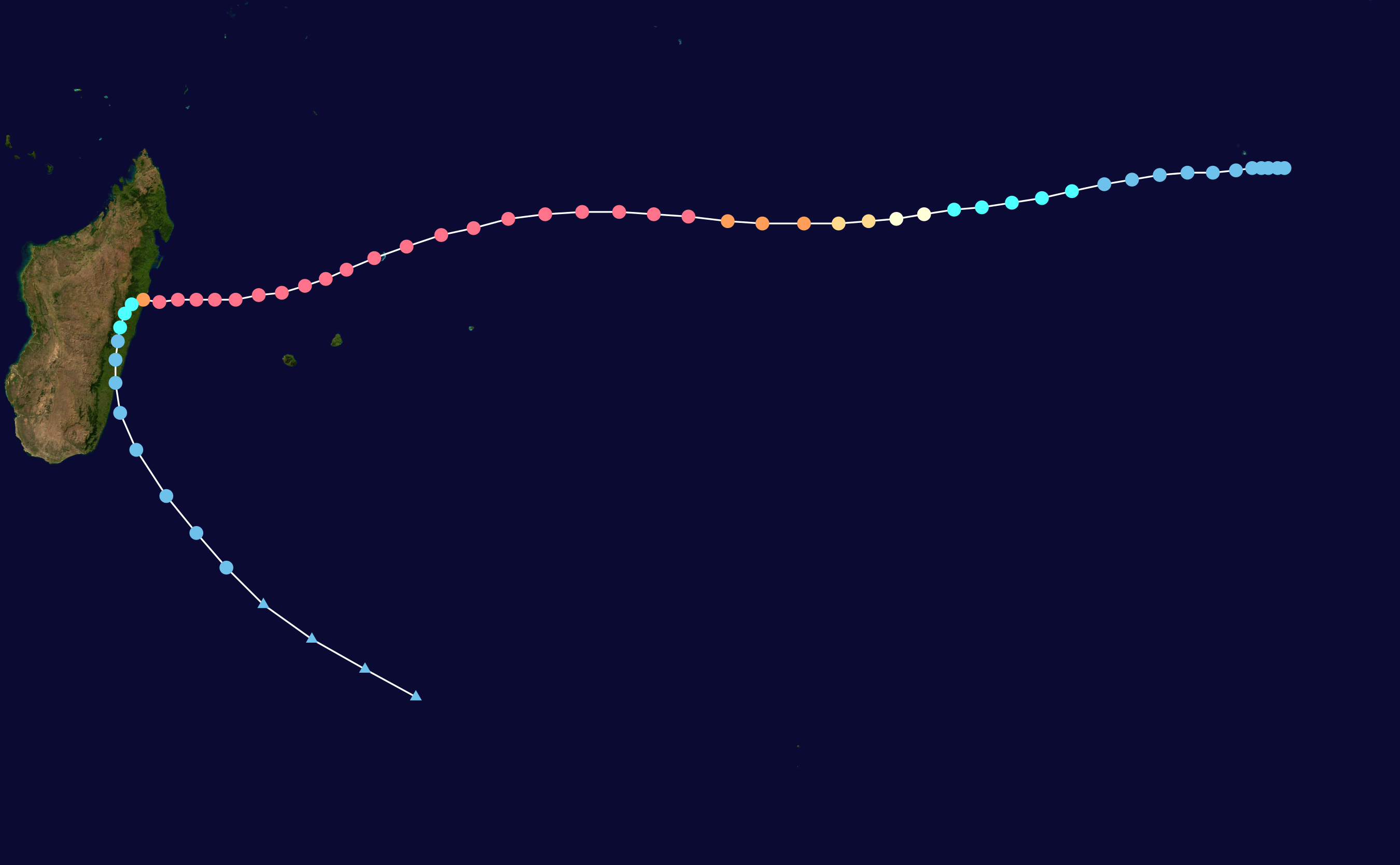
- Duration: March 7 – March 19
- Peak intensity: 195 km/h (120 mph) (10-min); 910 hPa (mbar)

In late February, a low-pressure area developed near the Cocos Islands, associated with the monsoon trough. After initially moving eastward, a ridge turned it to the west, and on March 7, the system crossed 90° E into the south-west Indian Ocean as a developing tropical depression. The next day, MFR upgraded it to Tropical Storm Litanne. For much of its track, Litanne moved generally to the west-southwest, to the north of a large ridge. The storm quickly intensified, developing an eye feature within its central dense overcast by late on March 8. Late on March 9, MFR upgraded Litanne to a tropical cyclone, after the storm developed a small, well-defined eye 20 km (12 mi) in diameter. With warm sea surface temperatures, Litanne intensified into an intense tropical cyclone by late on March 10, although it subsequently weakened slightly. The cyclone turned to the southwest due to a trough from the remnants of Kelvina. Around 2000 UTC on March 12, Litanne passed near St. Brandon, and the next day the cyclone passed about 300 km (190 mi) north of Réunion island. At the time, the storm's eye was 40 km (25 mi) wide, and the wind radius was about 175 km (109 mi) wide. The islands reported high surf but little effects. Subsequently, the storm turned more to the west, and Litanne restrengthened into an intense tropical cyclone while approaching the eastern coastline of Madagascar. MFR estimated peak winds of 195 km/h (120 mph) on March 14.

Weakening slightly after peaking in intensity, Cyclone Litanne continued to the west, making landfall near Brickaville in east-central Madagascar at 1600 UTC on March 15. This occurred months after cyclones Daisy and Geralda affected the same general area. Four hours before landfall, the storm had peak winds of 165 km/h (105 mph). A strengthening trough turned Litanne southward over the eastern portion of the country, and the storm dropped heavy rainfall. Flooding was limited, although high winds severely damaged the rice crop. Increasing wind shear removed the convection, causing quick weakening. On March 17, Litanne emerged from southeastern Madagascar into the Indian Ocean as a tropical depression, and the next day transitioned into an extratropical cyclone after being absorbed by a nearby trough. Five days later after accelerating to the southeast, the storm dissipated about 2,000 km (1,200 mi) south of where it first developed.

=== Severe Tropical Storm Mariola ===
- Severe tropical storm (MFR)
- Category 2 tropical cyclone (SSHWS)
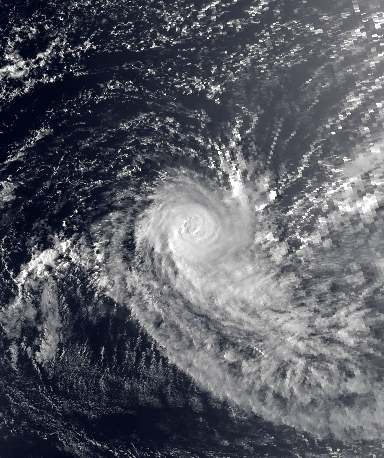
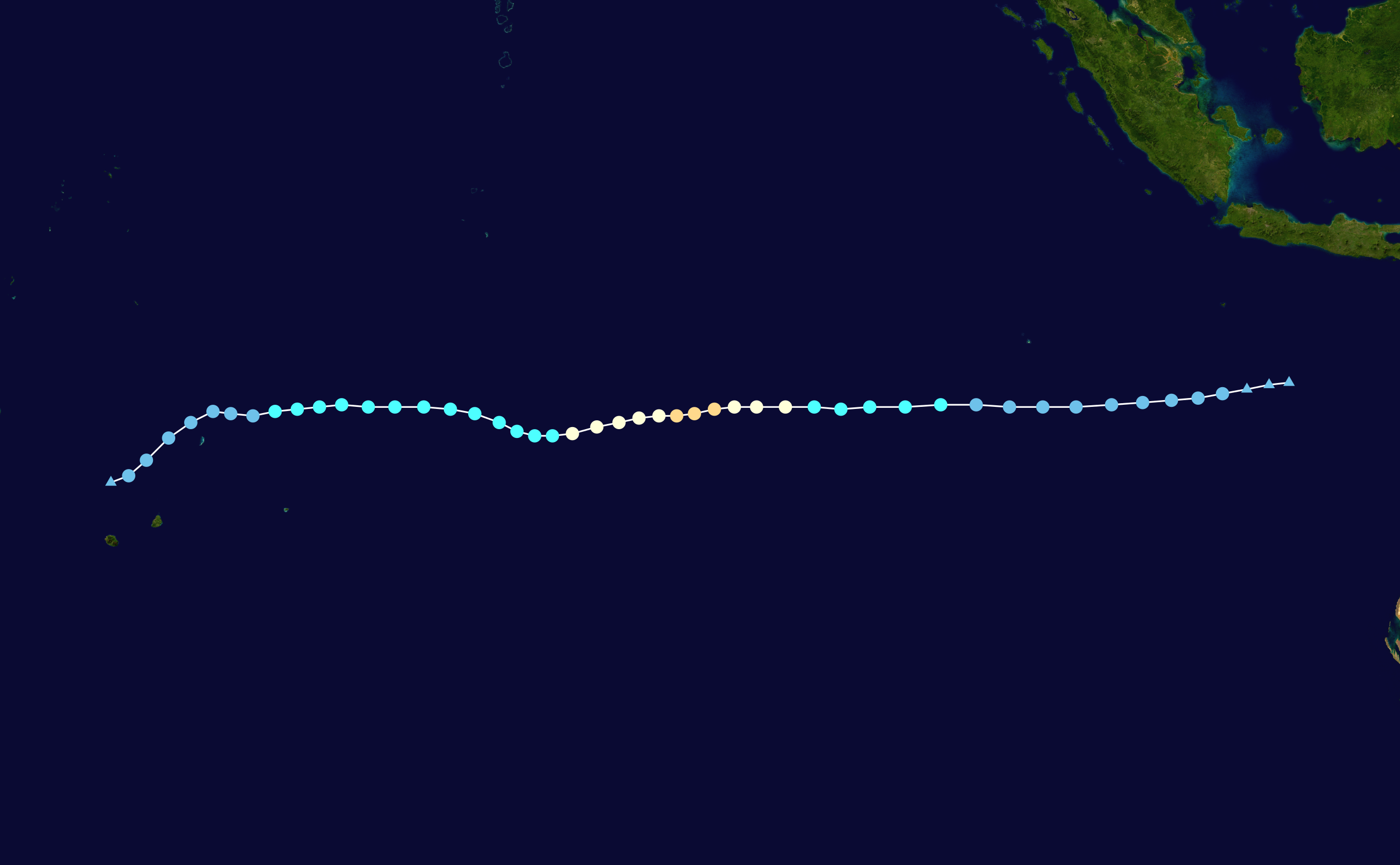
- Duration: March 10 – March 19
- Peak intensity: 115 km/h (70 mph) (10-min); 966 hPa (mbar)

The monsoon trough persisted east of the Cocos Islands in early March in the Australian basin, spawning the earlier Cyclone Litanne and the system that would eventually become Mariola. An area of convection developed on March 5, and gradually organized with favorable upper-level winds. The JTWC began tracking it on March 7, and MFR followed suit the next day, when the system was located about 2,000 km (1,200 mi) east of Litanne. On March 10, the MFR estimated the system became a tropical depression once it developed a central dense overcast, and that night the system crossed into the basin as a moderate tropical storm, making it one of three concurrent storms, along with Kelvina and Litanne. With the ridge to the south, the storm tracked generally westward for much of its duration. After MFR named the storm Mariola early on March 11, steady strengthening continued. On March 12, a small eye feature developed, indicating the storm was near tropical cyclone intensity. MFR estimated peak winds of 115 km/h (70 mph), and JTWC estimated peak winds of 165 km/h (105 mph).

Due to Litanne crossing the same path three days earlier, Mariola was unable to intensify further. It began weakening shortly after peak intensity, and the structure gradually deteriorated. The storm turned slightly to the south-west due to the remnants of Kelvina disrupting the ridge, although a west motion resumed after the ridge restrengthened. Cooler and drier air weakened the convection, and Mariola weakened below tropical storm status on March 18. The next day, the depression dissipated north of Reunion.

=== Intense Tropical Cyclone Nadia ===
- Intense tropical cyclone (MFR)
- Category 4 tropical cyclone (SSHWS)
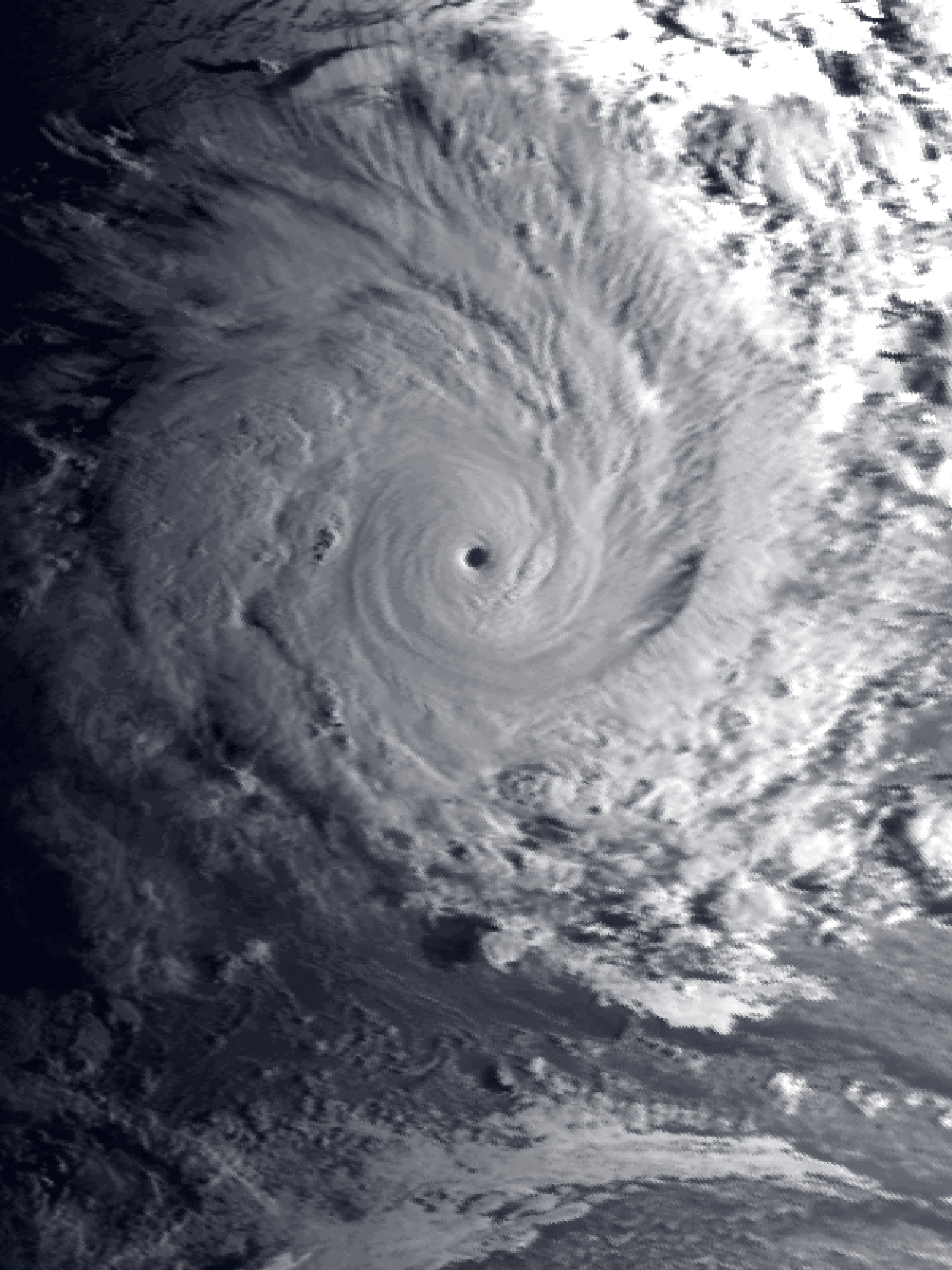
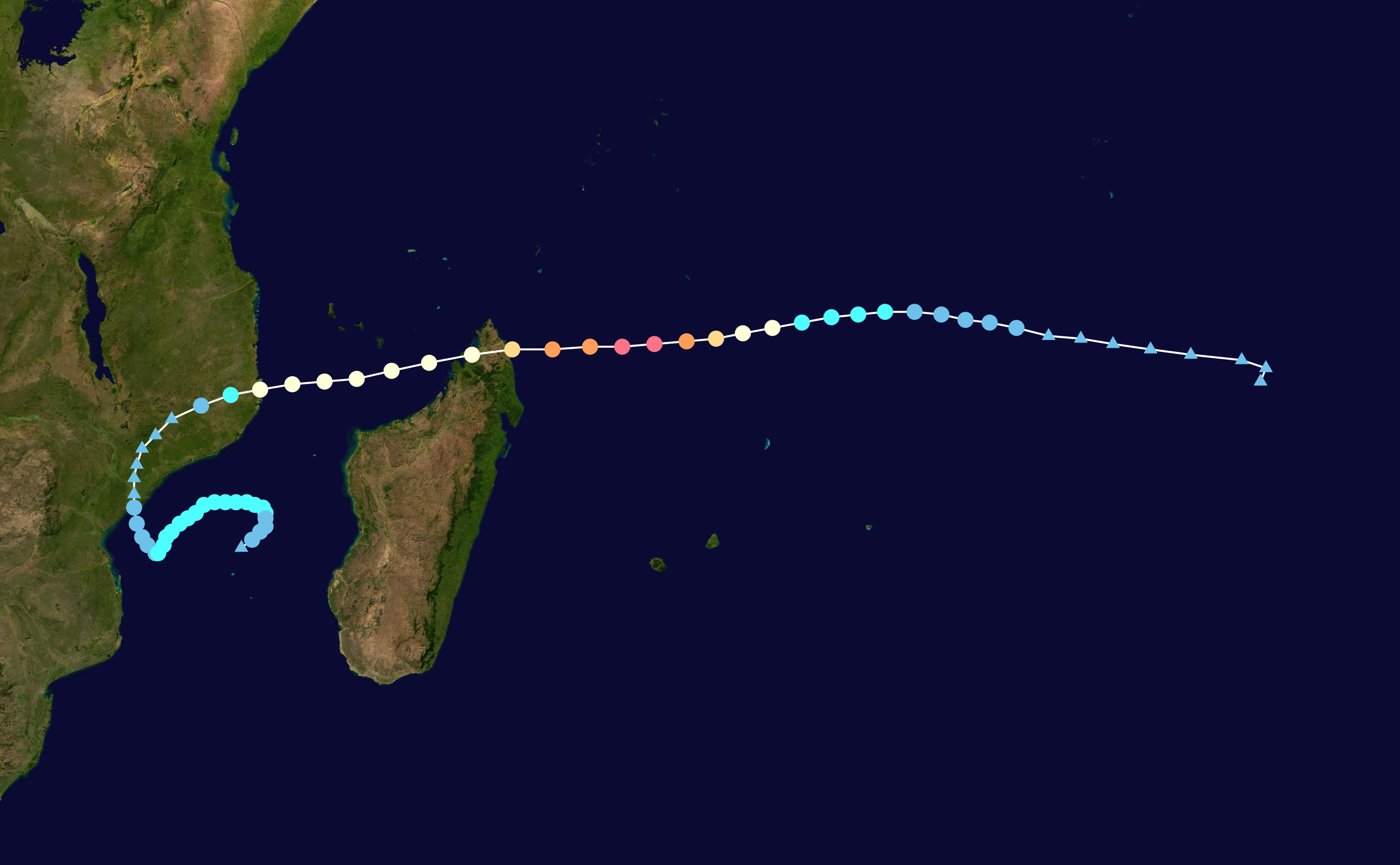
- Duration: March 16 – April 1
- Peak intensity: 175 km/h (110 mph) (10-min); 925 hPa (mbar)

Cyclone Nadia formed on March 16 and moved westward for the first ten days of its duration, due to a ridge to the south. Warm waters and low wind shear allowed for the storm to gradually strengthen, first into a moderate tropical storm on March 19 and later into a tropical cyclone on March 21. After developing a well-defined eye, Nadia intensified to reach winds of 175 km/h (110 mph) early on March 22, according to MFR. The JTWC estimated winds of about 220 km/h (135 mph). On March 23, the cyclone struck northern Madagascar, causing flooding and localized damage where it moved ashore. There were 12 deaths in the country. Nadia emerged into the Mozambique Channel as a weakened storm, although it reintensified slightly before making landfall in northeastern Mozambique on March 24. The storm turned southward through the country, emerging over water on March 26. It turned to the northeast and meandered over waters before dissipating on April 1.

Damage was heaviest in Mozambique, estimated at $20 million. Cyclone Nadia severely affected four provinces in the country, primarily Nampula Province where it moved ashore. There, 85% of the houses were destroyed, and across its path, the cyclone left 1.5 million people homeless. High winds caused widespread power outages, left areas without water, and significantly damaged crops, notably the cashew crop. The storm struck before the harvest, and lack of food caused 300 deaths in the months after the storm. Across Mozambique, Nadia directly caused 240 deaths and injured thousands. Effects spread as far inland as Malawi.

=== Intense Tropical Cyclone Odille ===
- Intense tropical cyclone (MFR)
- Category 3 tropical cyclone (SSHWS)
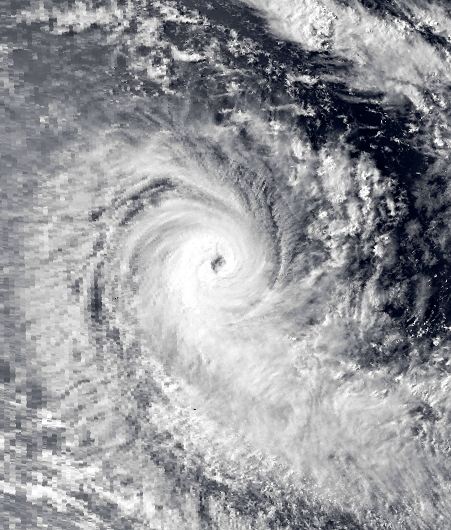
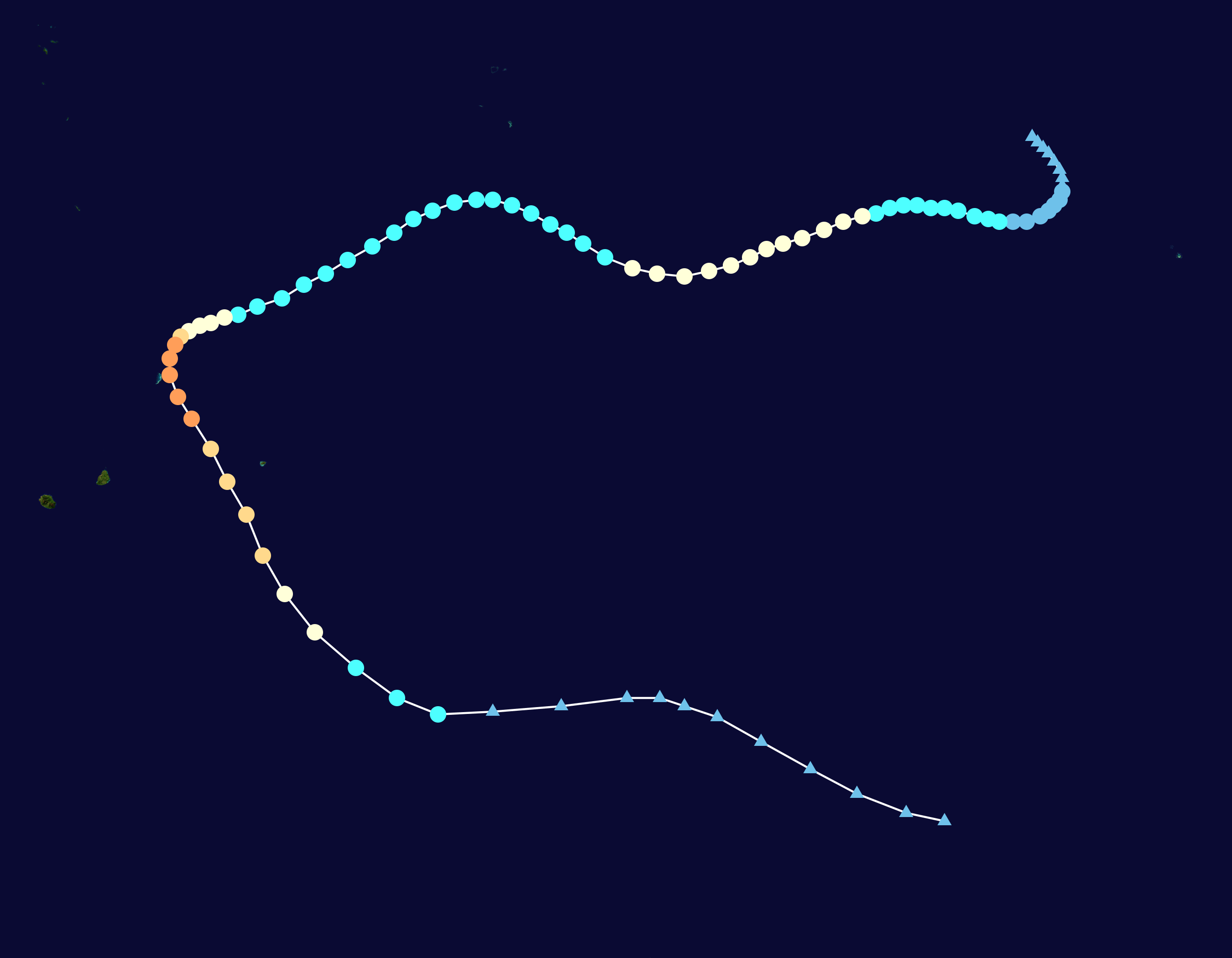
- Duration: March 30 – April 14
- Peak intensity: 175 km/h (110 mph) (10-min); 925 hPa (mbar)

Around March 26, an area of disturbed weather persisted just east of 90° E, associated with a low-pressure area. That day, the JTWC began tracking the system. Located north of an anticyclone, the system tracked slowly to the south before curving to the west. On March 30, it became a tropical depression, and that day crossed into the basin. The next day, the depression was named Odille after it intensified further. With low wind shear, the storm steadily intensified as it moved to the west, reaching severe tropical cyclone status on April 2 after an eye feature developed. The JTWC estimated winds of 150 km/h (95 mph) on April 3, equivalent to a strong Category 1 hurricane, although subsequently Odille weakened after turning to the northwest and experiencing increased wind shear. By April 6, the system had weakened to a tropical disturbance with a poorly defined center, which was dislocated from the remainder of the convection.

On April 4, Odille began redeveloping convection and re-intensified into a moderate tropical storm, after entering an area of more favorable conditions. Around that time, it began moving to the southwest due to a break between the ridge. On April 10, Odille intensified into a tropical cyclone while moving slowly around a ridge. The next day, it intensified into an intense tropical cyclone while passing near St. Brandon and turning to the southeast due to an approaching trough. Odille developed a well-defined eye 45 km (28 mi) in diameter, and MFR estimated peak winds of 175 km/h (110 mph), while the JTWC estimated winds of 195 km/h (120 mph). On April 12, the cyclone passed about 150 km (95 mi) west of Rodrigues, where wind gusts reached 125 km/h (78 mph) at Port Mathurin. Steady weakening occurred as Odille accelerated and experienced increasing shear, weakening below tropical cyclone status on April 13. The next day, the storm became extratropical, which lasted three more days until it was absorbed by the cold front.

== Season effects ==
This table lists all the cyclones that developed in the Indian Ocean, during the 1993–94 South-West Indian Ocean cyclone season. It includes their intensity, duration, name, landfalls, deaths, and damages.

| Name | Dates | Peak intensity | | | Areas affected | Damage (USD) | Deaths | Ref(s). |
| Name | Dates | Category | Wind speed | Pressure | Areas affected | Damage (USD) | Deaths | Ref(s). |
|---|---|---|---|---|---|---|---|---|
| Alexina | November 9–14 | Moderate Tropical Storm | 85 km/h (55 mph) | 982 hPa (29.00 inHg) | | | | |
| Bettina | November 25 – December 2 | Severe Tropical Storm | 110 km/h (70 mph) | 970 hPa (28.64 inHg) | | | | |
| Cecilia | December 12–21 | Severe Tropical Storm | 100 km/h (60 mph) | 972 hPa (28.70 inHg) | Mauritius, Reunion | | | |
| Daisy | January 7 – January 16 | Tropical Cyclone | 155 km/h (95 mph) | 935 hPa (27.61 inHg) | St. Brandon, Madagascar | | | |
| Edmea | January 13 – January 19 | Severe Tropical Storm | 95 km/h (60 mph) | 976 hPa (28.82 inHg) | | | | |
| Pearl-Farah | January 18 (entered basin) – January 21 | Tropical Cyclone | 120 km/h (75 mph) | 960 hPa (28.35 inHg) | | | | |
| Geralda | January 26 – February 8 | Intense Tropical Cyclone | 205 km/h (125 mph) | 905 hPa (26.72 inHg) | Madagascar | $10 million | 231 | |
| Hollanda | February 6 – February 14 | Tropical Cyclone | 155 km/h (95 mph) | 940 hPa (27.76 inHg) | Mauritius, Reunion | $135 million | 2 | |
| Ivy | February 8 – February 20 | Tropical Cyclone | 140 km/h (85 mph) | 950 hPa (28.05 inHg) | Rodrigues | | | |
| Julita | February 15 – February 18 | Tropical Depression | 55 km/h (35 mph) | 995 hPa (29.38 inHg) | Madagascar | | | |
| Kelvina | March 5 – March 11 | Moderate Tropical Storm | 85 km/h (55 mph) | 985 hPa (29.09 inHg) | | | | |
| Litanne | March 7 – March 19 | Intense Tropical Cyclone | 195 km/h (120 mph) | 910 hPa (26.87 inHg) | St. Brandon, Madagascar | | | |
| Mariola | March 10 – March 19 | Severe Tropical Storm | 115 km/h (70 mph) | 966 hPa (28.53 inHg) | | | | |
| Nadia | March 16 – April 1 | Intense Tropical Cyclone | 175 km/h (110 mph) | 925 hPa (27.32 inHg) | Madagascar, Comoros, Mayotte, Mozambique, Malawi | $20.2 million | 252 | |
| Odille | March 29 – April 14 | Intense Tropical Cyclone | 175 km/h (110 mph) | 925 hPa (27.32 inHg) | St. Brandon, Rodrigues | | | |
Season aggregates
| 15 systems | November 9 – April 14 | | 205 km/h (125 mph) | 905 hPa (26.72 inHg) | | $165 million | 490 | |

== See also ==
- Atlantic hurricane seasons: 1993, 1994
- Pacific hurricane seasons: 1993, 1994
- Pacific typhoon seasons: 1993, 1994
- North Indian Ocean cyclone seasons: 1993, 1994
