= 1994 Pacific hurricane season =

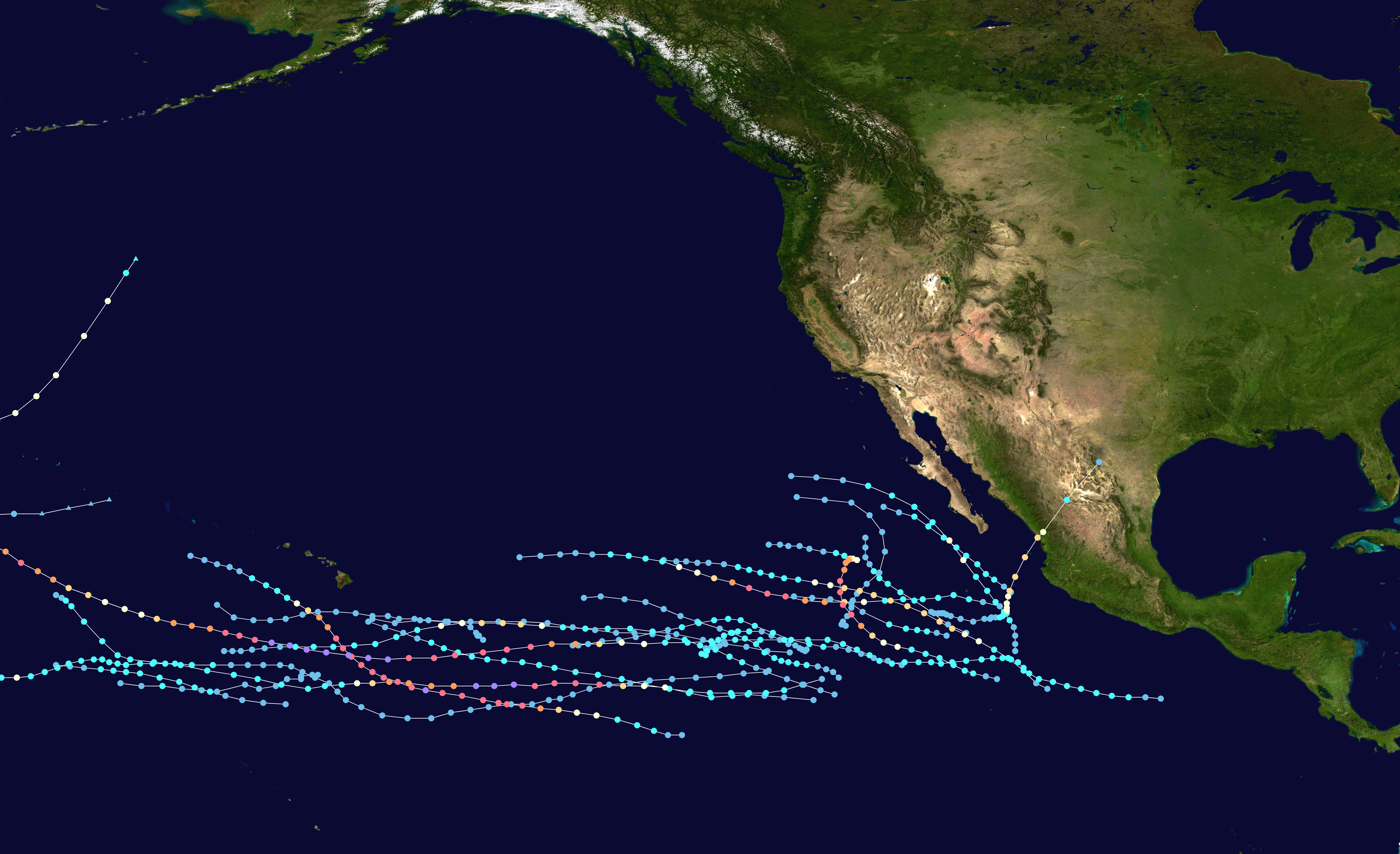
- Season summary map

Seasonal boundaries
- First system formed: June 18, 1994
- Last system dissipated: October 26, 1994

Strongest storm
- By maximum sustained winds: John
  - Maximum winds: 175 mph (280 km/h) (1-minute sustained)
  - Lowest pressure: 929 mbar (hPa; 27.43 inHg)
- By central pressure: Gilma
  - Maximum winds: 160 mph (260 km/h) (1-minute sustained)
  - Lowest pressure: 920 mbar (hPa; 27.17 inHg)

Seasonal statistics
- Total depressions: 22 official, 2 unofficial
- Total storms: 20
- Hurricanes: 10
- Major hurricanes (Cat. 3+): 5
- Total fatalities: 4 total
- Total damage: $720 million (1994 USD)

Related articles
- Timeline of the 1994 Pacific hurricane season; 1994 Atlantic hurricane season; 1994 Pacific typhoon season; 1994 North Indian Ocean cyclone season

The 1994 Pacific hurricane season was the final season of the eastern north Pacific's consecutive active hurricane seasons that started in 1982. The season officially started on May 15, 1994, in the eastern Pacific, and on June 1, 1994, in the central Pacific, and lasted until November 30, 1994. These dates conventionally delimit the period of each year when most tropical cyclones form in the northeastern Pacific Ocean. The first tropical cyclone formed on June 18, while the last system dissipated on October 26. This season, twenty-two tropical cyclones formed in the north Pacific Ocean east of the dateline, with all but two becoming tropical storms or hurricanes. A total of 10 hurricanes occurred, including five major hurricanes. The above average activity in 1994 was attributed to the formation of the Spring to late Summer–early Fall 1994 El Niño.

Of note in this season is an unusual spree of very intense storms; the season was the first on record to see more than one Category 5 hurricane, as well as the first of four to see three Category 5 hurricanes, a feat later repeated in 2002, 2018 and 2026 seasons. Hurricanes Emilia, Gilma, John, and Olivia all reached a pressure below 930 millibars. Hurricane John was the farthest-traveling tropical cyclone on record at 13,180 km (8,190 mi). Elsewhere, Hurricane Rosa caused four casualties in Mexico as the basin's only landfalling tropical storm or hurricane and was later responsible for flooding in Texas.

== Season summary ==
This season, 22 tropical cyclones formed in the north Pacific Ocean east of the dateline. All but two of them became tropical storms or hurricanes. In the Eastern Pacific region (140°W to North America), nineteen tropical depressions formed, of which seventeen became tropical storms, nine further intensifying into hurricanes, and five ultimately reaching major hurricanes of Category 3 intensity or higher on the Saffir–Simpson scale. These numbers are slightly above the long-term averages of fifteen tropical storms, nine hurricanes, and four major hurricanes.

In the Central Pacific Hurricane Center's area of responsibility (140°W to the International Date Line), three depressions, two tropical storms, and one hurricane formed. Overall, there were eleven tropical cyclones, eight tropical storms, five hurricanes, and three major hurricanes that formed or entered the Central Pacific region. These numbers are well above the long-term average of four tropical cyclones, two hurricanes, one tropical storm, and two depressions. The exceptionally high activity was contributed to by an El Niño ongoing at the time.

The only named storm to make landfall this year was Hurricane Rosa, which killed four people in Western Mexico and forced over 400 to be evacuated. Other notable storms include Hurricane Olivia, a high-end Category 4 system, the three Category 5 hurricanes Emilia, Gilma, and John. Both John and Hurricane Li existed in two of the three basins (East, and West) of the Pacific Ocean.

This season marked the end of the Northeastern Pacific's most recent active period, which began in 1982, and at the time, included the five most active Pacific hurricane seasons. Beginning in 1995, multi-decadal factors switched to a phase that suppressed Pacific hurricane activity. After 1994, Pacific hurricane seasons were generally below normal, with the exception of 1997, until 2014.

The 1994 Pacific hurricane season set several records. First, three hurricanes reached Category 5 intensity on the Saffir–Simpson hurricane scale, setting a record later tied in 2002, then tied again in 2018. Second, Hurricane John lasted longer and spent more time tropical than any other tropical cyclone on Earth in recorded history. However, the former record was later surpassed by Cyclone Freddy in 2023. Third, 11 tropical cyclones entered or formed in the central Pacific, a record shared with the 1992 season until the 2015 season broke the record. Finally, of the four most intense hurricanes recorded in the Central Pacific, three of them occurred this season.

The season began with the formation of Tropical Depression One-E on June 18 and ended with the dissipation of Tropical Depression Nona on October 26. No named systems formed in May, three in June, four in July, five in August, six in September, two in October, and none in November. The total length of the season, from the formation of the first depression to the dissipation of the last, was 130 days. Moreover, the total accumulated cyclone energy (ACE) of this season was 185*10^{4} kt^{2}, qualifying this season as above-normal. (Note: Accumulated cyclone energy (ACE) is a measure of how active a hurricane season is. ACE is calculated by squaring the windspeed of a cyclone with at least gale-force winds every six hours, summing the results, and dividing that total by 10,000 (i.e. 10^{4} kt^{2}). The National Hurricane Center uses ACE to rank hurricane seasons as above-normal, near-normal, and below-normal.) (Note: This ACE value excludes calculations from Hurricanes Li and John when the storms were in the Western Pacific basin.)

== Systems ==
=== Tropical Storm Aletta ===
- Tropical storm (SSHWS)
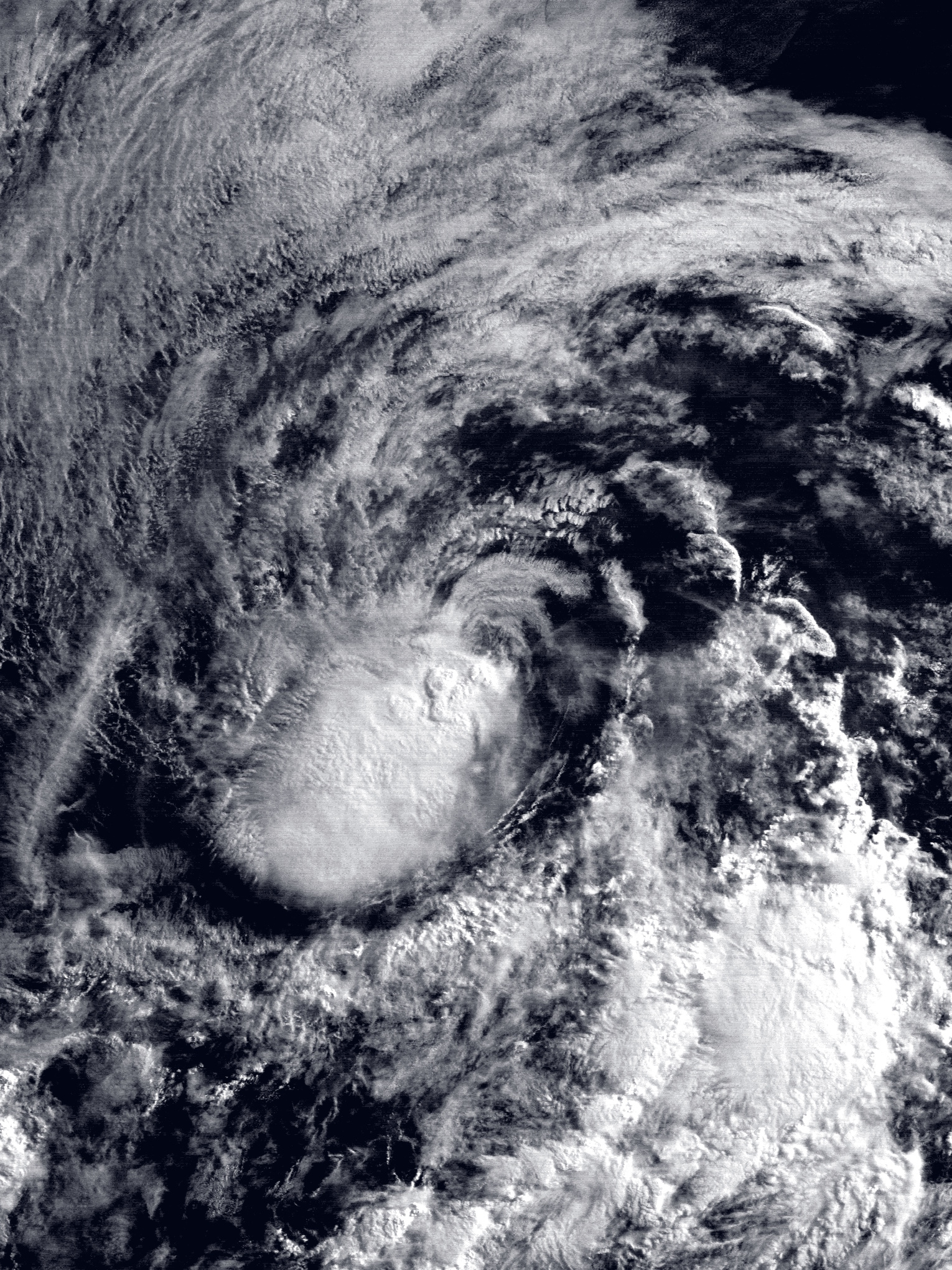
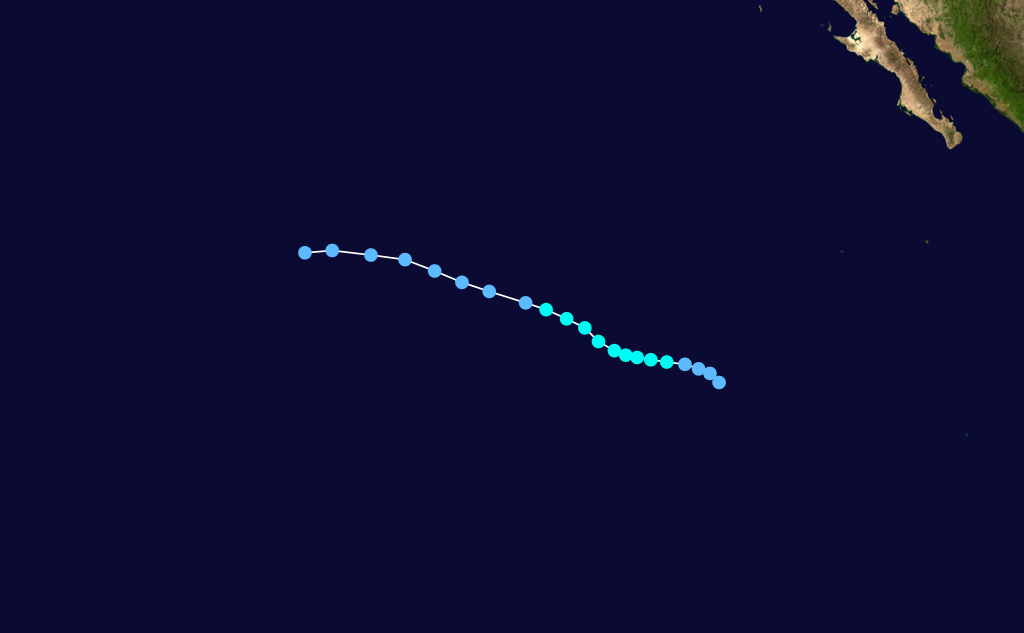
- Duration: June 18 – June 23
- Peak intensity: 50 mph (85 km/h) (1-min); 999 mbar (hPa)

Tropical Depression One-E formed from an area of disturbed weather on June 18. It strengthened to Tropical Storm Aletta the next day. It continued intensifying and reached its peak intensity on June 20. Vertical wind shear began to weaken the storm thereafter. The weakening trend continued, weakening Aletta to a depression on June 21. The system dissipated June 23. Aletta's remnant low, however, could be tracked on satellite images for days following the storm. The low finally dissipated north of Hawaii.

=== Tropical Storm Bud ===
- Tropical storm (SSHWS)
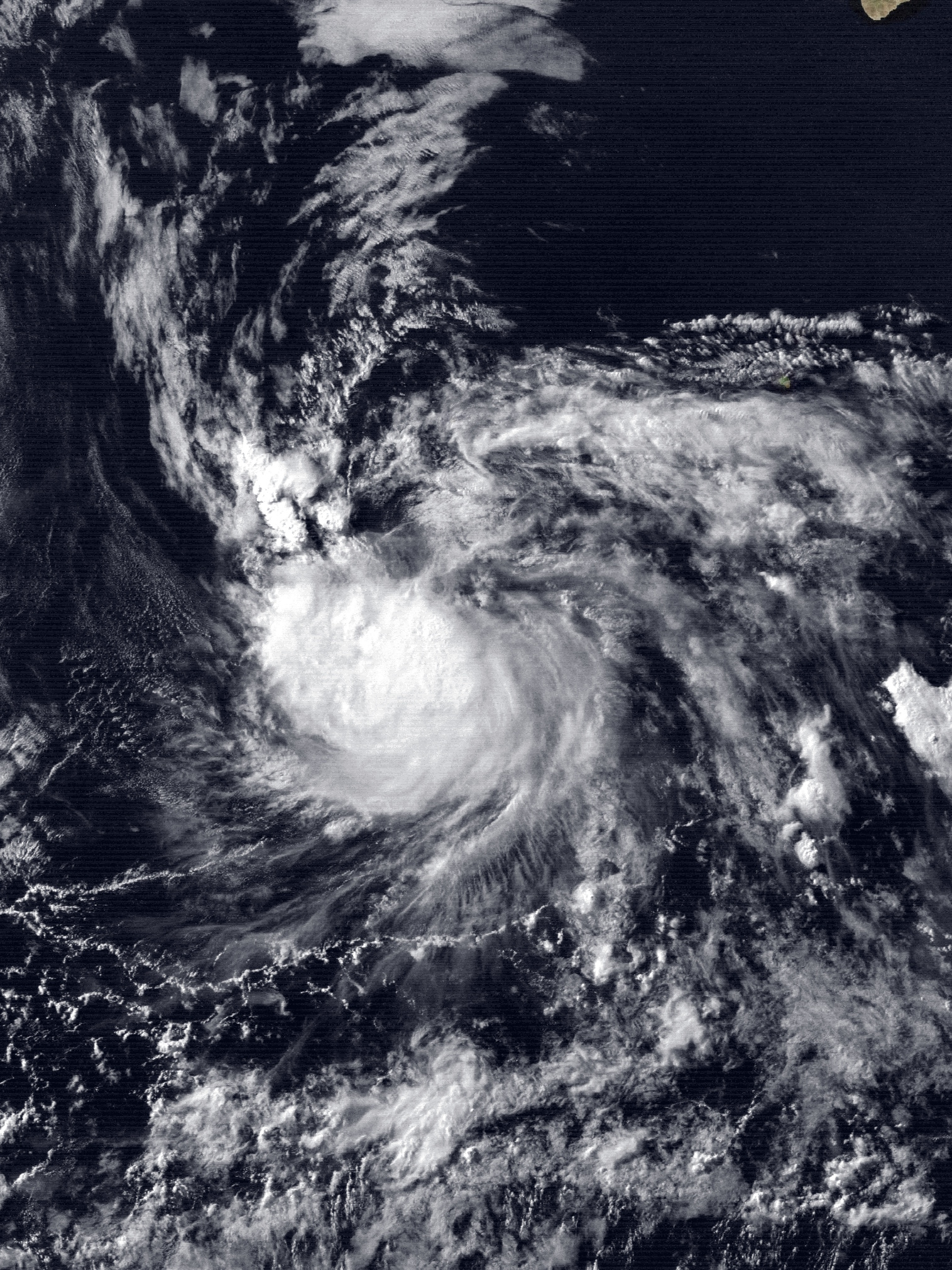
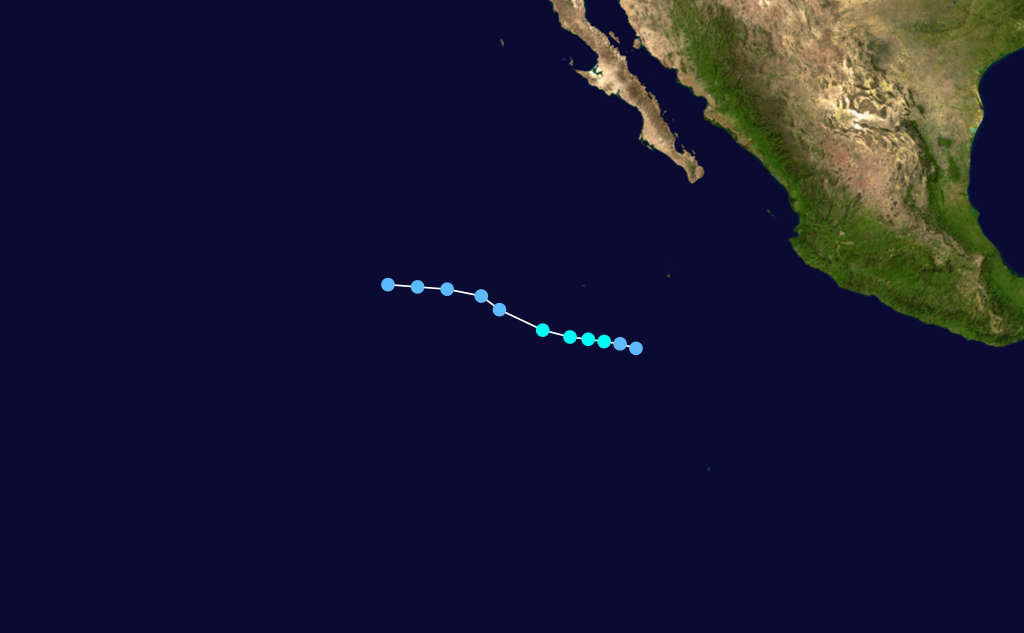
- Duration: June 27 – June 29
- Peak intensity: 45 mph (75 km/h) (1-min); 1003 mbar (hPa)

Tropical Depression Two-E formed on June 27 about 575 miles (925 km) south-southwest of the tip of the Baja California Peninsula. The depression headed west-northwest, gradually turned to the northwest, and strengthened into Tropical Storm Bud on June 27. Early the next day, Bud peaked in intensity. Shear caused by a nearby upper-level low slowly weakened Bud. Later on June 28, a second center of circulation developed. The two centers started a Fujiwhara interaction. The second center then became dominant and the first one vanished. This confused structure is similar to what happened to Tropical Storm Arlene (1993). This confused structure also weakened Bud to a tropical depression on the afternoon of the same day the second center formed. Bud then headed westward over cool waters and dissipated on June 29. Tropical Storm Bud spent its entire life over the open ocean far from land areas.

=== Hurricane Carlotta ===
- Category 2 hurricane (SSHWS)
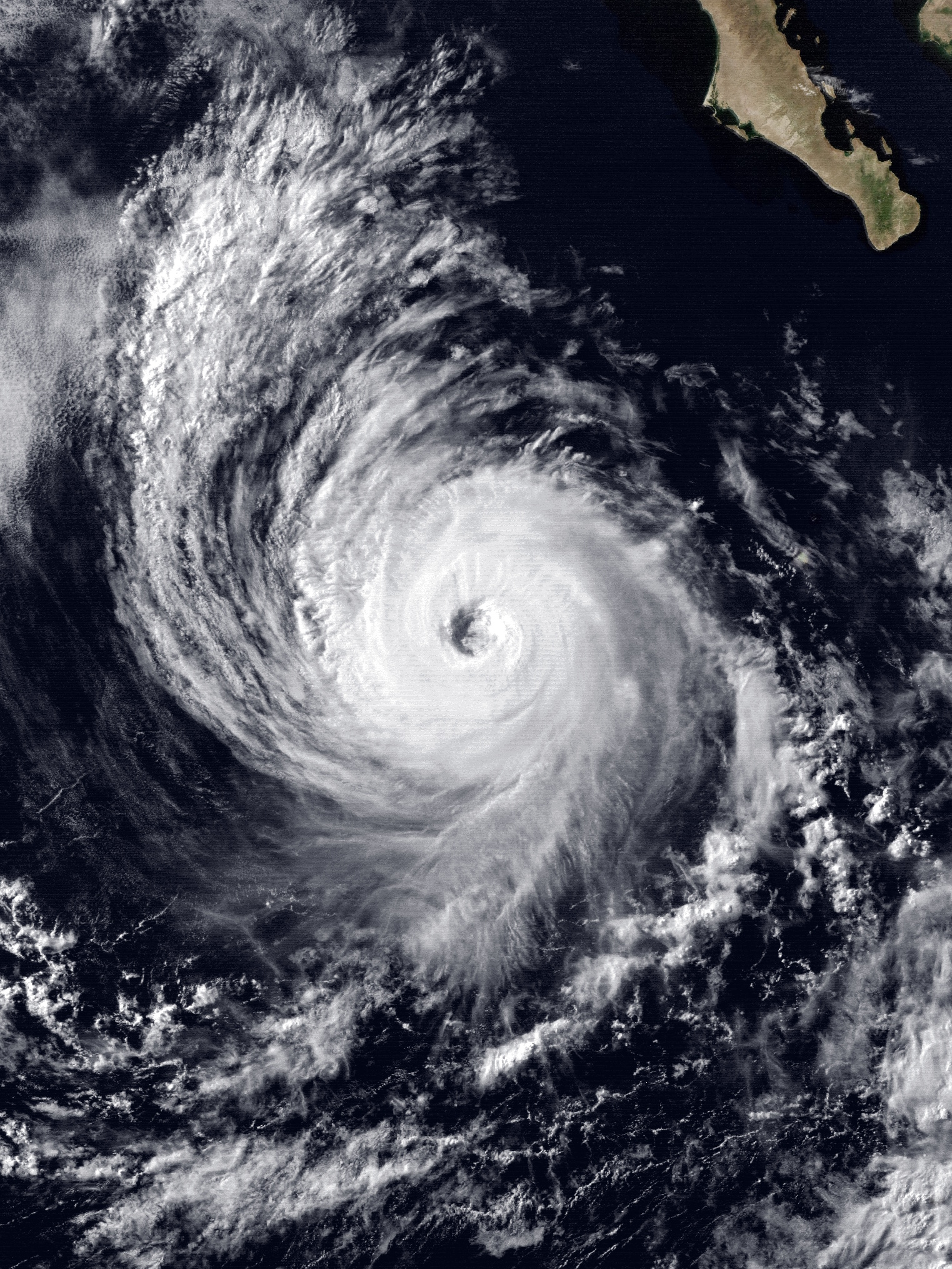
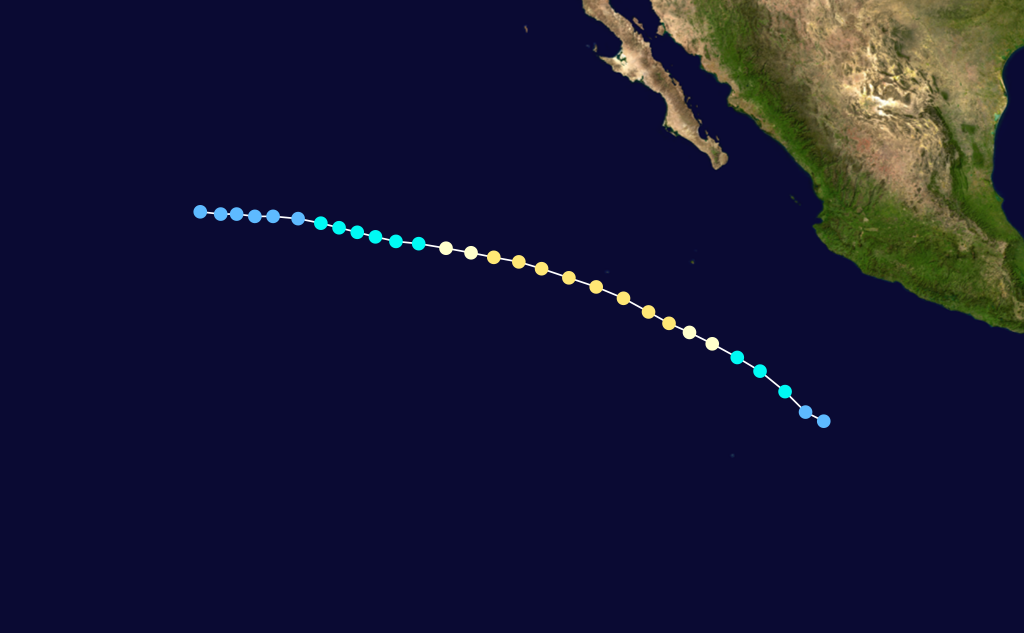
- Duration: June 28 – July 5
- Peak intensity: 105 mph (165 km/h) (1-min); 967 mbar (hPa)

The tropical depression that would be Carlotta formed on June 28, which quickly became a tropical storm. Carlotta buffeted Socorro Island with sustained winds of 39 mph (63 km/h) on June 30. A large eye became visible. Because of this, the NHC upgraded the storm to a hurricane. Carlotta peaked in intensity on July 1, as a 105 mph (169 km/h) hurricane. It gradually weakened as it moved into cooler waters, dissipating on July 5. Carlotta did not threaten land.

=== Tropical Storm Daniel ===
- Tropical storm (SSHWS)
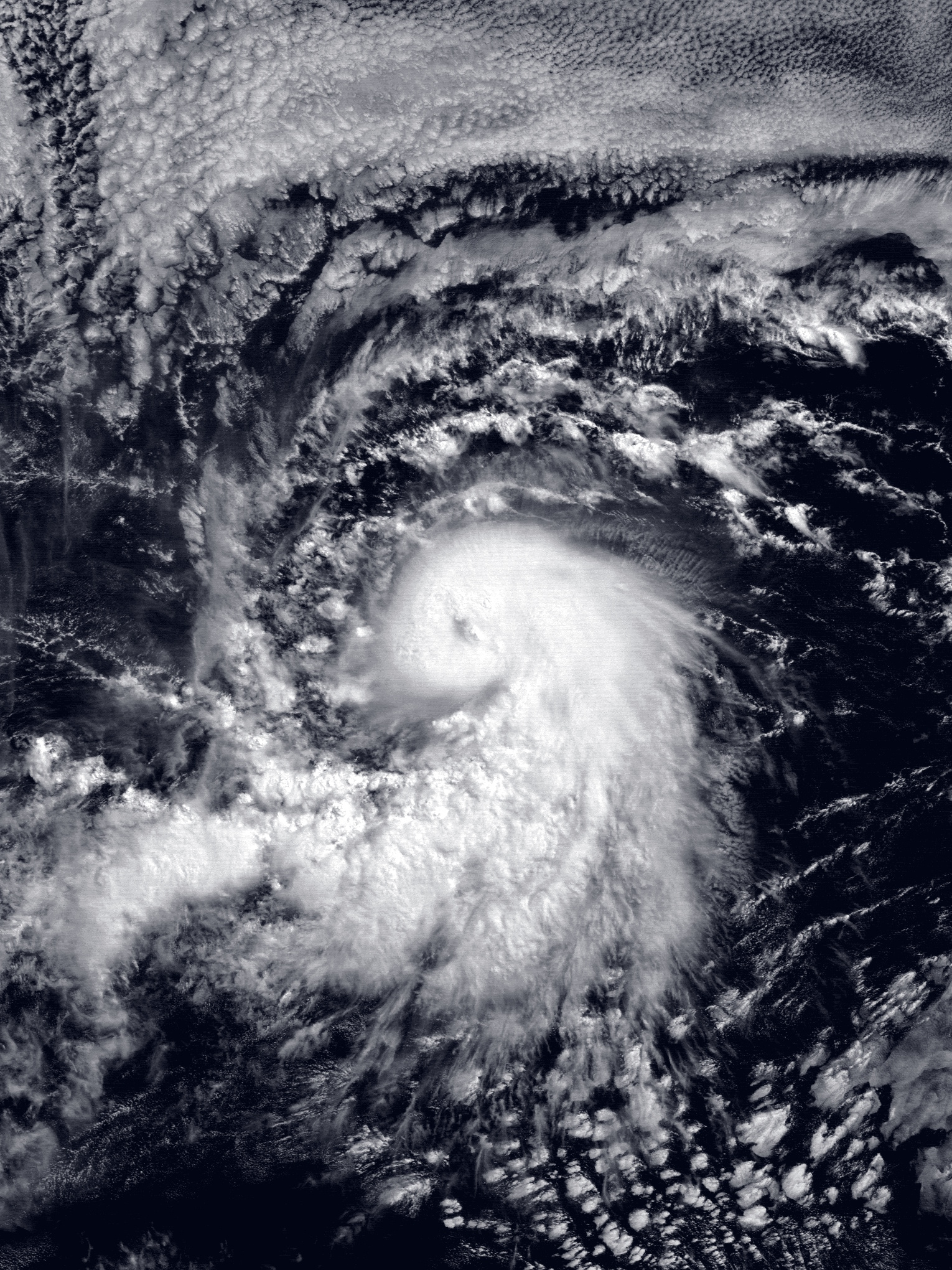
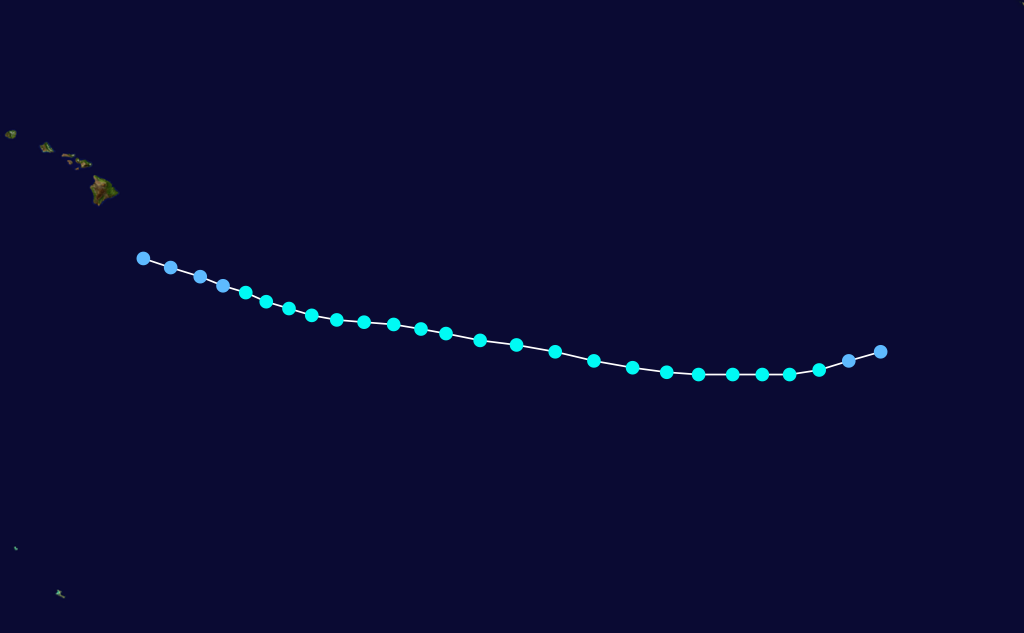
- Duration: July 8 – July 14
- Peak intensity: 65 mph (100 km/h) (1-min); 993 mbar (hPa)

On July 8, a disturbance located about 1,000 miles (1,600 km) southwest of the southern tip of the Baja California Peninsula developed a circulation and became Tropical Depression Four-E. Convection increased, and the depression strengthened into Tropical Storm Daniel. Upper-level outflow improved, and Daniel peaked in intensity on July 9. Daniel slowly declined as it continued westward. It entered the central Pacific on July 11. Wind shear weakened Daniel as it approached the Big Island, and by July 15 had degenerated into an open wave.

When Daniel was approaching Hawaii, moderate surf of 4 to 6 feet (1.2 to 1.8 m) impacted the south and southeast shores of the Big Island on July 13 and 14. Daniel's remnants also passed about 100 miles (160 km) south of South Point, Hawaii, on July 15. That day, they caused rainfall on windward slopes of the Big Island locally reaching 5 inches (130 mm).

=== Hurricane Emilia ===
- Category 5 hurricane (SSHWS)
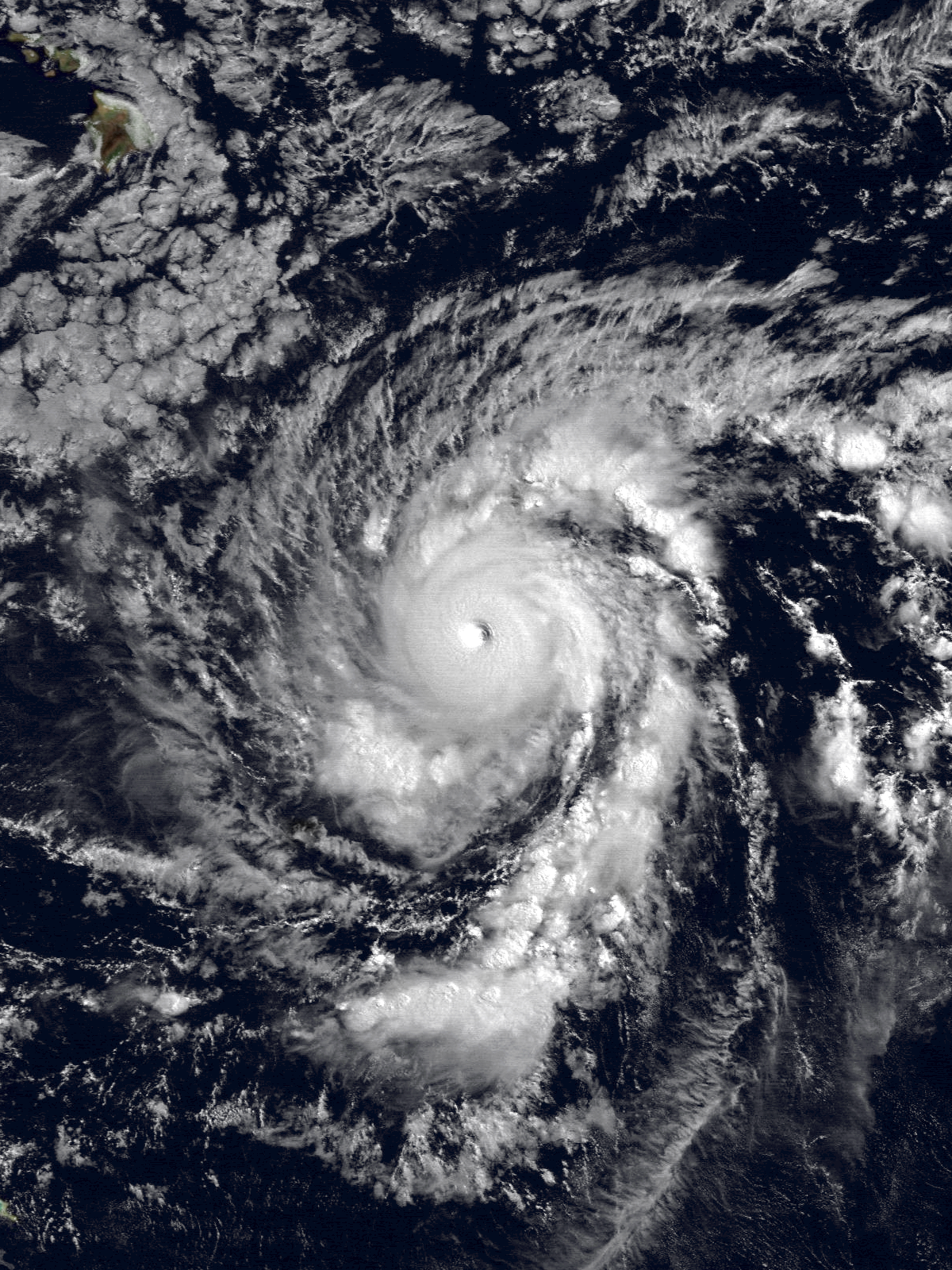
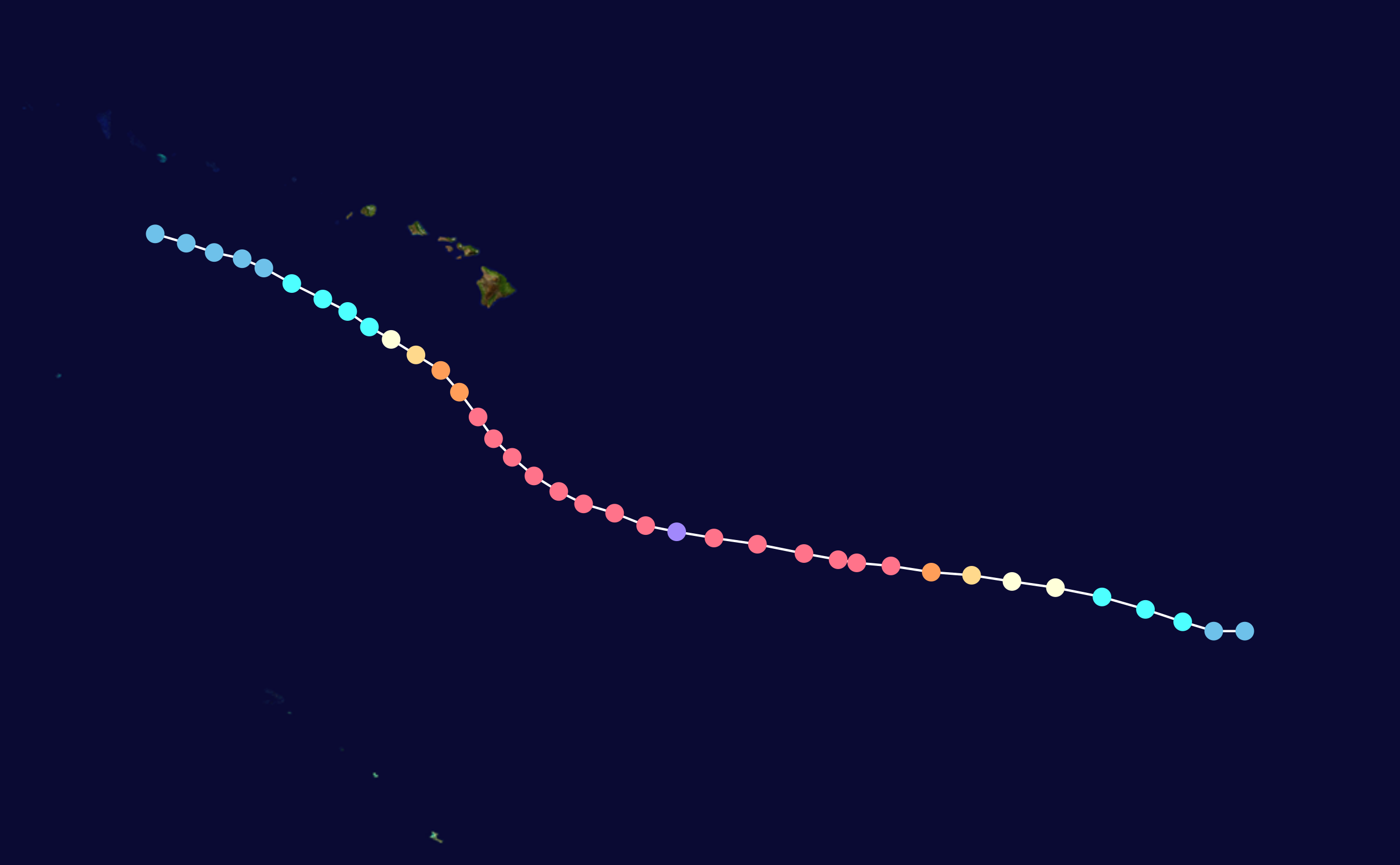
- Duration: July 16 – July 25
- Peak intensity: 160 mph (260 km/h) (1-min); 926 mbar (hPa)

On June 29, a weak tropical wave exited the west African coast and traversed the Atlantic, showing no signs of organization or convective activity. Moving within the Intertropical Convergence Zone, the tropical disturbance remained inactive until July 14, when it developed into an area of low pressure roughly 2,110 mi (3,400 km) east-southeast of the Hawaiian Islands. A low-level circulation became evident, and the system was designated as a tropical depression on July 16. Within 12 hours, satellite imagery suggested that the system had intensified into Tropical Storm Emilia with 40 mph (64 km/h) sustained winds. Emilia steadily intensified into a minimal hurricane by the next morning, as it moved west-northwest. At 18:00 UTC, Emilia was upgraded to Category 2 status as it crossed 140°W and entered the Central Pacific Hurricane Center's (CPHC) area of responsibility, which noted that Emilia was "well developed." Emilia then proceeded to rapidly intensify, with maximum sustained winds increasing from 105 to 160 mph (169 to 257 km/h) over the next 48 hours. At Emilia's peak strength, an Air Force reconnaissance aircraft measured a minimum central pressure of 926 millibars (27.3 inHg), the lowest pressure ever recorded in a Central Pacific hurricane at that time. (Note: The Central Pacific Hurricane Center (CPHC) lists Emilia as a Category 5 cyclone, but the National Hurricane Center (NHC) classified Emilia as a strong Category 4 hurricane with 155 mph (249 km/h) sustained winds. However, in 2008, the NHC upgraded the storm into a Category 5 hurricane for 6 hours.)

On July 20, Emilia briefly weakened into a Category 4 hurricane, but it was re-upgraded to Category 5 status by the CPHC 12 hours later during the day. Subsequently, Emilia began to weaken for the final time. An upper-level trough in the westerlies caused the cyclone to turn northwest on July 21. Emilia moved over progressively cooler waters, and vertical wind shear from the westerlies negatively impacted the hurricane. The central pressure steadily rose to 965 millibars (28.5 inHg), and Emilia diminished into a marginal Category 3 hurricane. On July 22, Emilia continued to weaken, and it passed within 170 mi (270 km) of the Big Island. It was the closest approach to the islands. Later, Emilia's peak winds dropped to 75 mph (121 km/h). Emilia gradually turned west-northwest, and the circulation moved with the trade winds. Emilia weakened into a tropical depression on July 24, and a remnant swirl of stratocumulus clouds was noted. The system dissipated on the same day.

While Emilia passed south of Hawaii, swells of 6–10 feet (1.8–3.0 metres) were reported near the Puna and Ka‘ū coasts. Waikiki Beach in Honolulu reported a 5 ft (1.5 m) high surf. Surf was lower along the Kona and Kohala coasts. Winds were gusty, causing a few trees to be blown over and branches to be broken. Some minor roof damage was caused by the winds. International observatories and the Keck Telescope on the top of Mauna Kea were forced to close their domes due to the high winds. Rainfall ranged from light to moderate.

=== Tropical Storm Fabio ===
- Tropical storm (SSHWS)
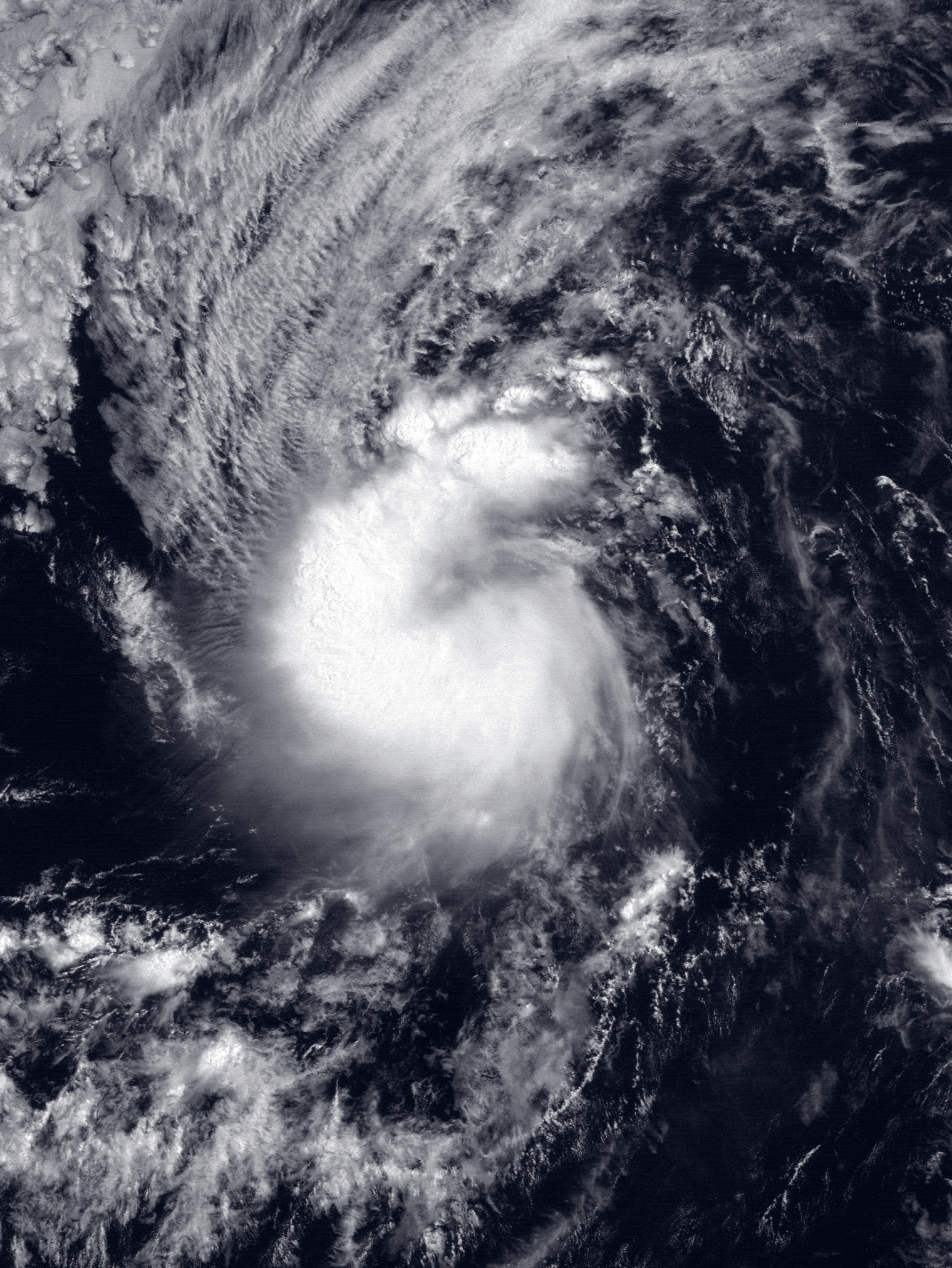
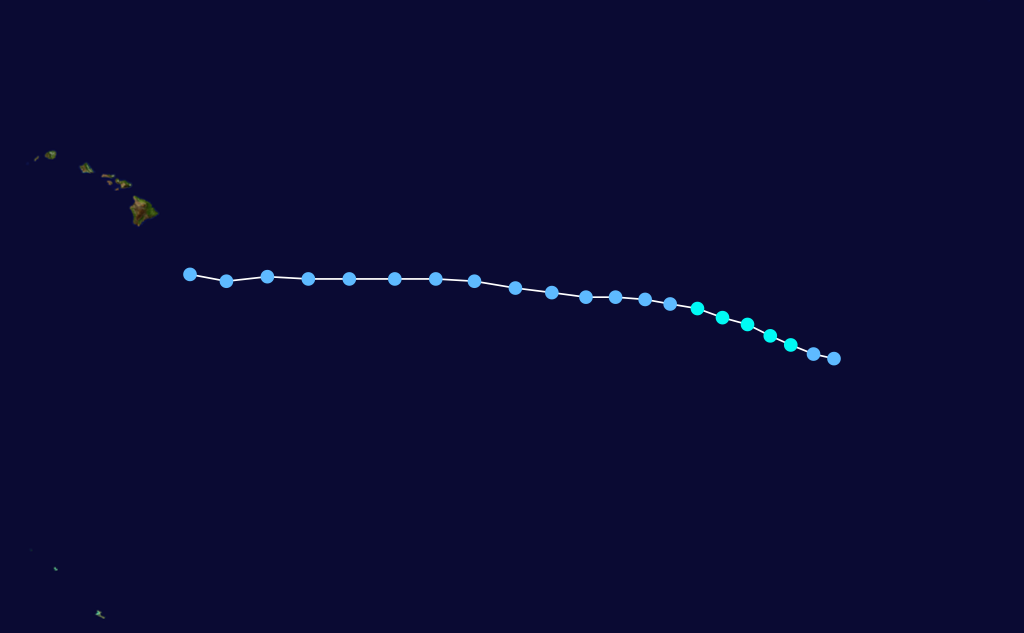
- Duration: July 19 – July 24
- Peak intensity: 45 mph (75 km/h) (1-min); 1002 mbar (hPa)

A tropical depression formed on July 19. Later that day, it strengthened into Tropical Storm Fabio. Fabio headed generally west or northwestward. It entered the central Pacific as a tropical depression, and dissipated on July 24.

Fabio's remnants brought locally heavy rainfall to Hawaii, reaching 3 to 4 inches (76 to 102 mm).

=== Hurricane Gilma ===
- Category 5 hurricane (SSHWS)
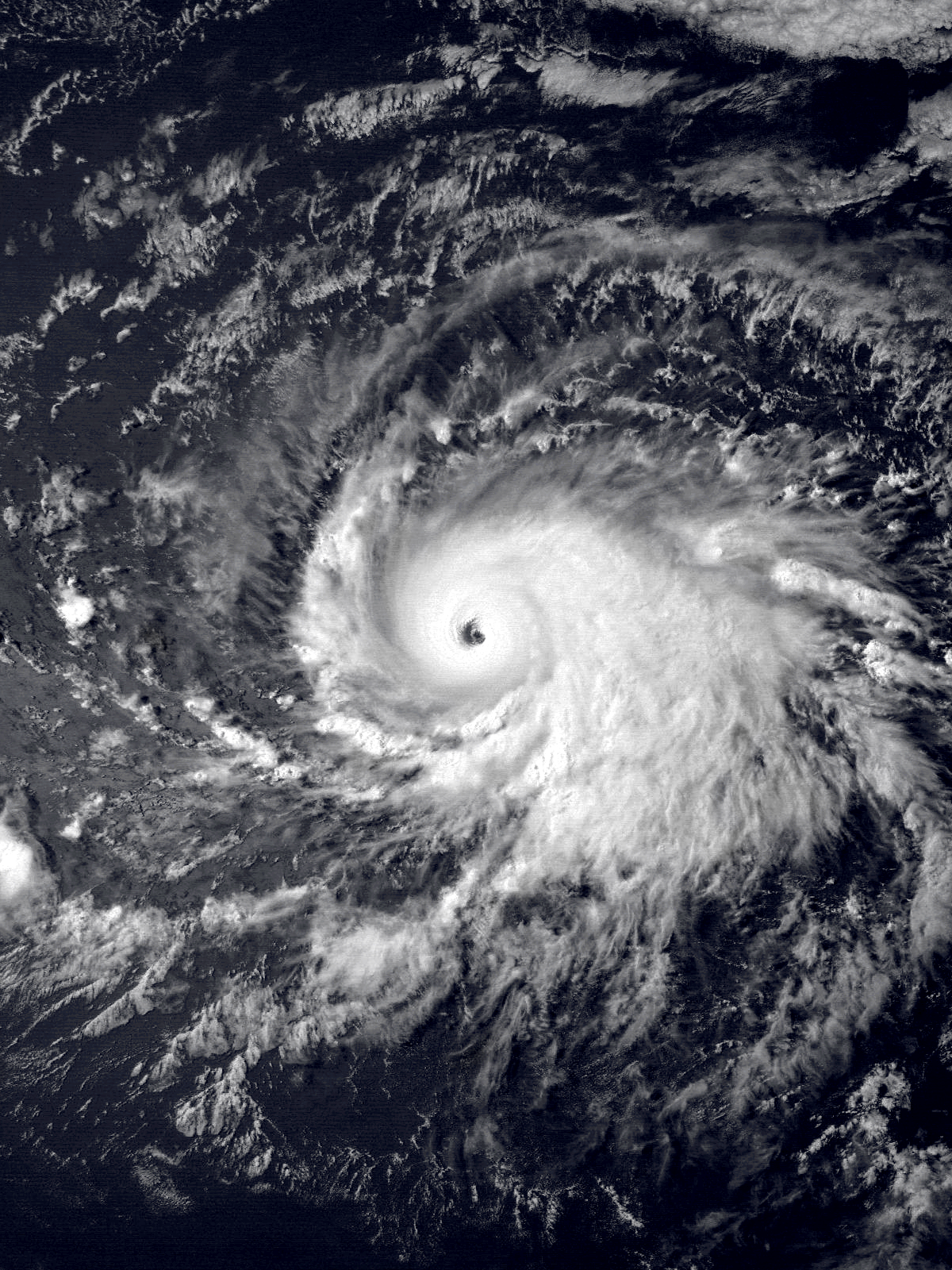
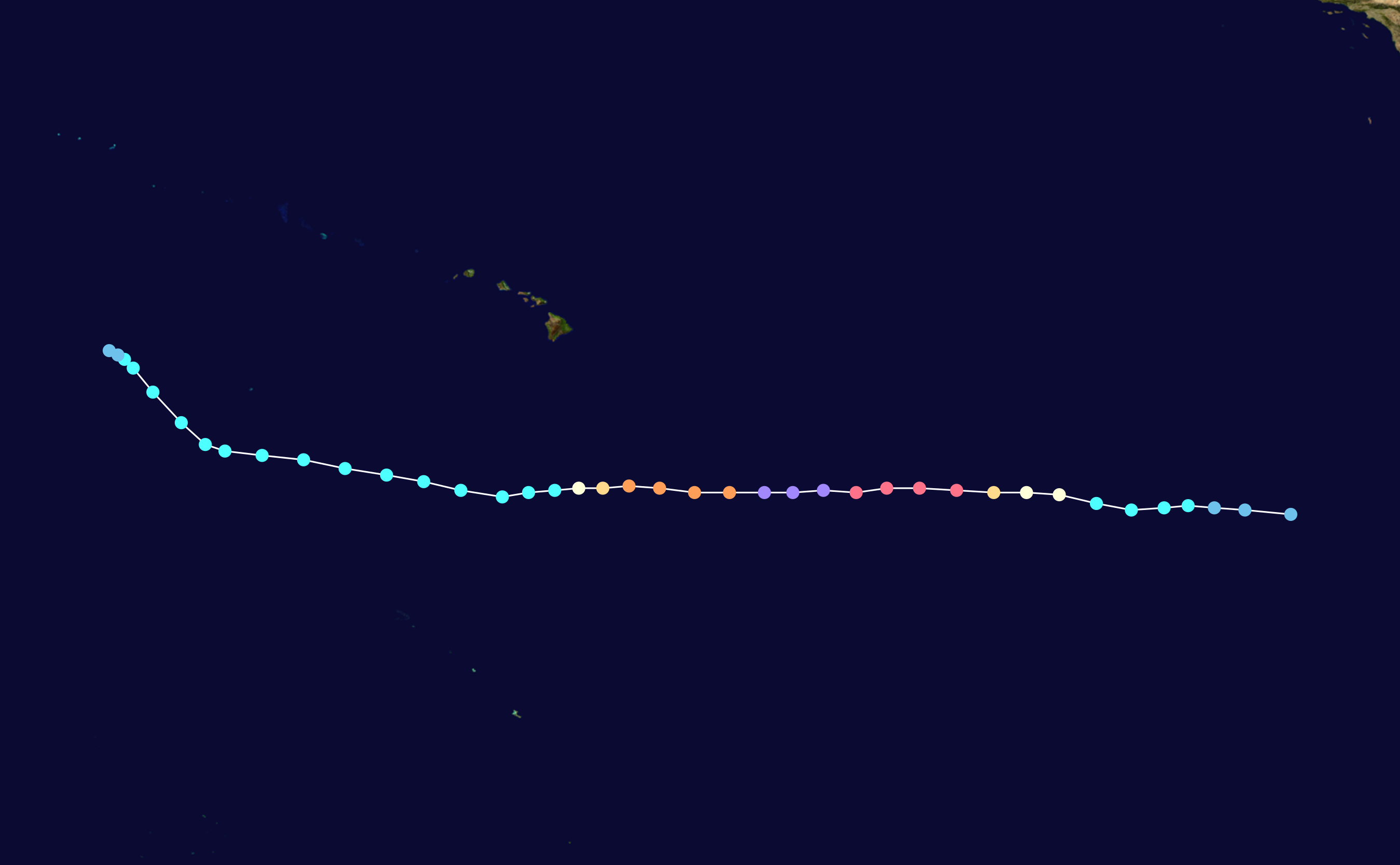
- Duration: July 21 – July 31
- Peak intensity: 160 mph (260 km/h) (1-min); 920 mbar (hPa)

A tropical wave traversed the Atlantic Ocean in mid-July, entering the eastern Pacific by July 16. Afterward, thunderstorms increased, followed by gradual development. On July 21, the NHC designated the system as Tropical Depression Seven-E, southwest of the Baja California peninsula. A strong ridge steered the system westward, which would remain the same throughout most of the storm's existence. Following an increase in organization, the depression intensified into Tropical Storm Gilma early on July 22. The storm developed deep convection and rainbands, and only 24 hours after becoming a tropical storm, Gilma intensified into a hurricane. Low wind shear and warm sea surface temperatures of 29 °C (84 °F) led to rapid intensification. A small, well-defined eye developed within the center of the hurricane, surrounded by very deep convection. On July 24, Gilma entered the central Pacific, and soon after attained its peak intensity as a Category 5 hurricane with winds of 160 mph (255 km/h) and a barometric pressure estimated at 920 mbar (hPa; 27.17 inHg). After maintaining this intensity for roughly 12 hours, Gilma weakened due to wind shear. Late on July 27, Gilma fell to tropical storm status, and by the next day its circulation was exposed from the thunderstorms. Late on July 28, Gilma approached within 100 mi (160 km) of Johnston Atoll. The island received light rain, wind gusts to near gale force, and surf. The storm weakened to tropical depression status on July 30, and dissipated the next day to the south of Midway Atoll.

=== Hurricane Li ===
- Category 1 hurricane (SSHWS)
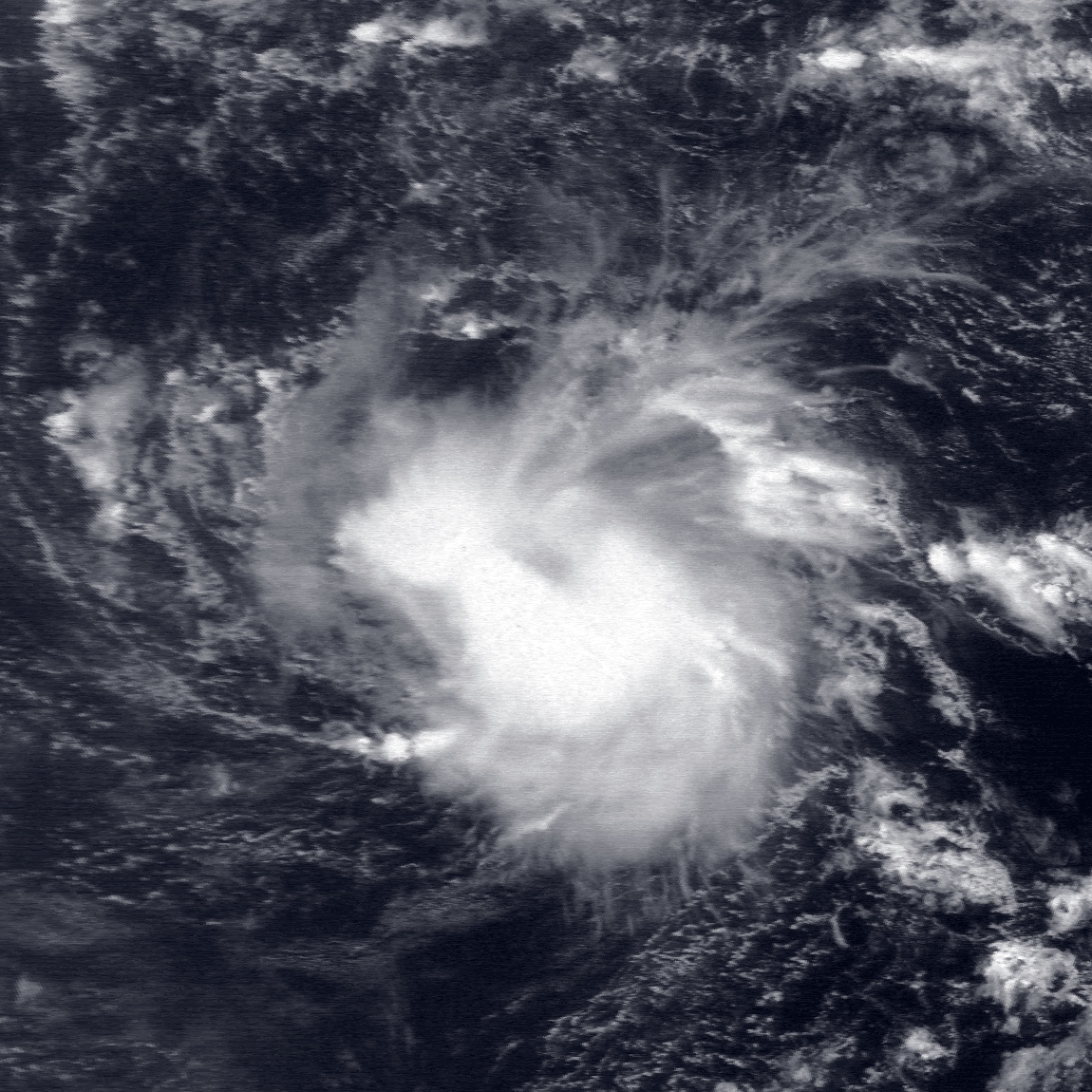
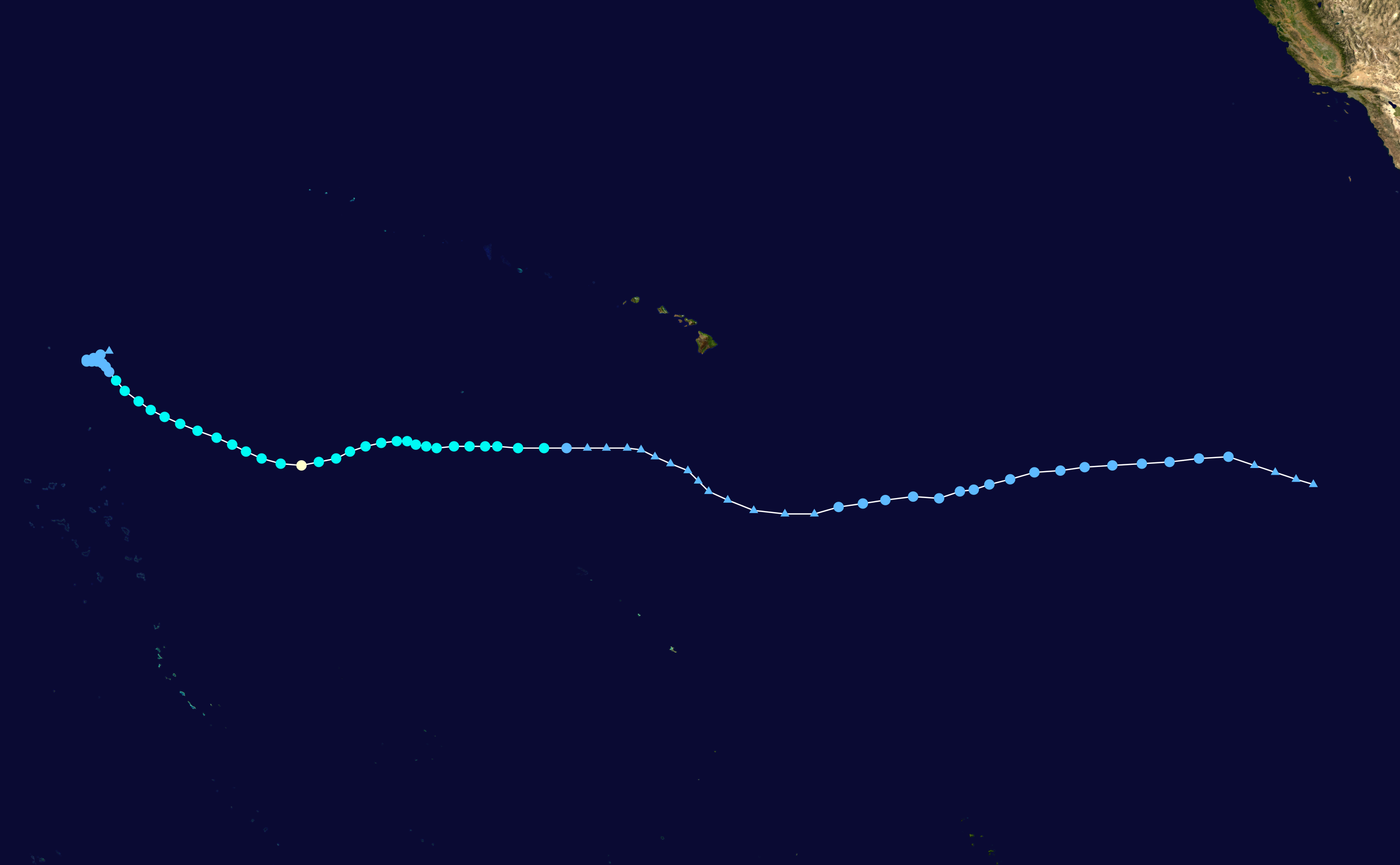
- Duration: July 31 – August 12 (Exited basin)
- Peak intensity: 75 mph (120 km/h) (1-min); 1007 mbar (hPa)

A tropical disturbance southwest of Cabo San Lucas organized into Tropical Depression Eight-E on July 31. It headed west-northwest without strengthening much, and crossed into the central Pacific on August 2. Eight-E developed a second center of circulation, which became dominant, and then became bound up in the Intertropical Convergence Zone. Eight-E then became disorganized, with multiple centers of circulation, and advisories were discontinued on August 5. The depression's remains continued their westward path well south of the Hawaiian Islands. The depression regenerated on August 8. It soon strengthened into a tropical storm and was named Li, which is Hawaiian for "Lee". Li approached the dateline on its generally westward heading. Just before crossing, it intensified into a minimal Category 1 hurricane. It crossed the dateline on August 12 and became a storm in the 1994 Pacific typhoon season. Wind shear from a tropical upper-tropospheric trough weakened back into a tropical storm as it crossed the dateline, and the Joint Typhoon Warning Center downgraded Li with its first advisory. Li stayed a tropical storm until August 16, where it weakened into a tropical depression. The system then began recurving, and dissipated on August 18. A weakening Tropical Depression Li caused showers on Wake Island.

Hurricane Li is one of only eight tropical cyclones to exist on all three North Pacific Ocean tropical cyclone basins.

=== Tropical Storm Hector ===
- Tropical storm (SSHWS)
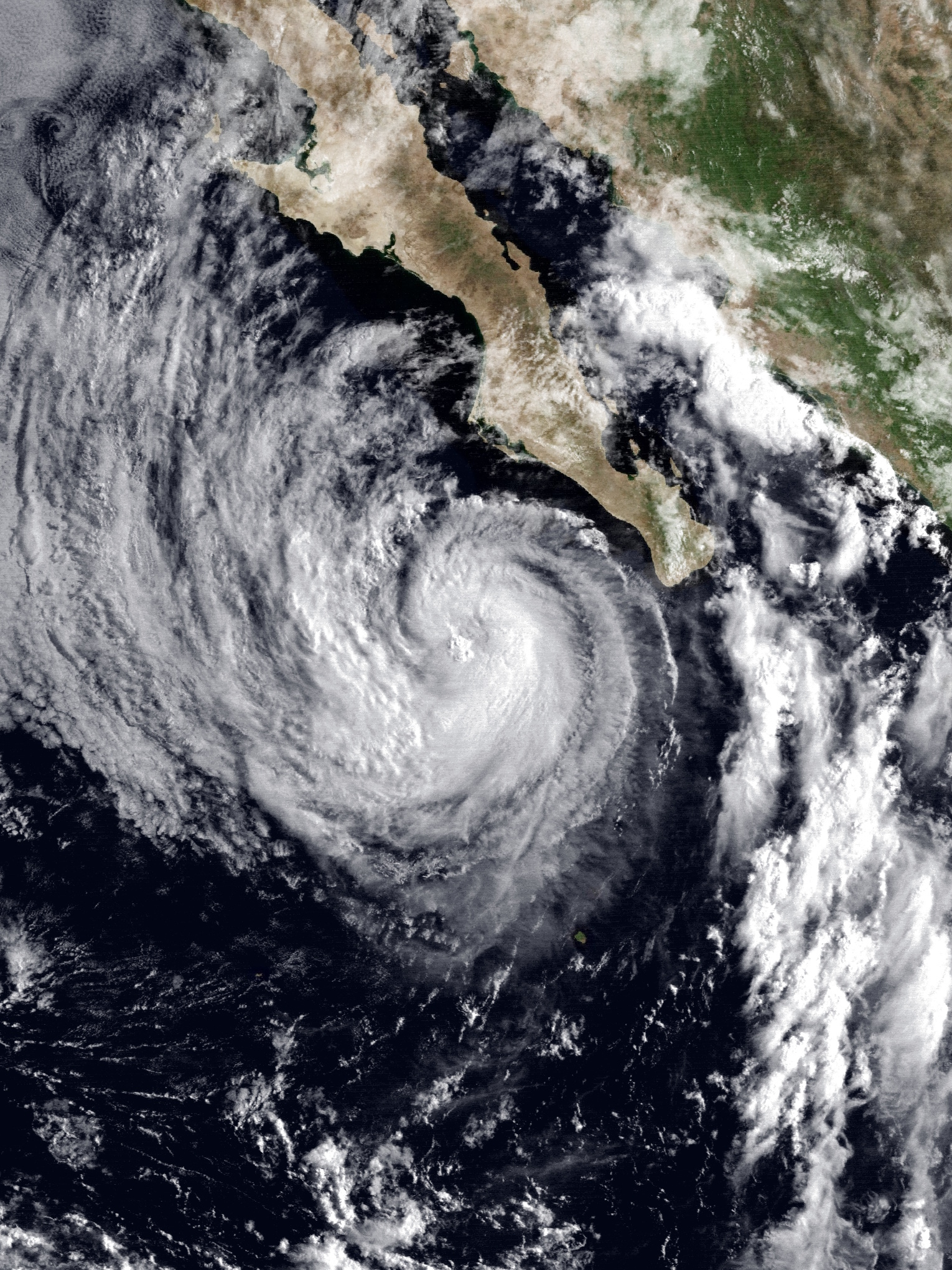
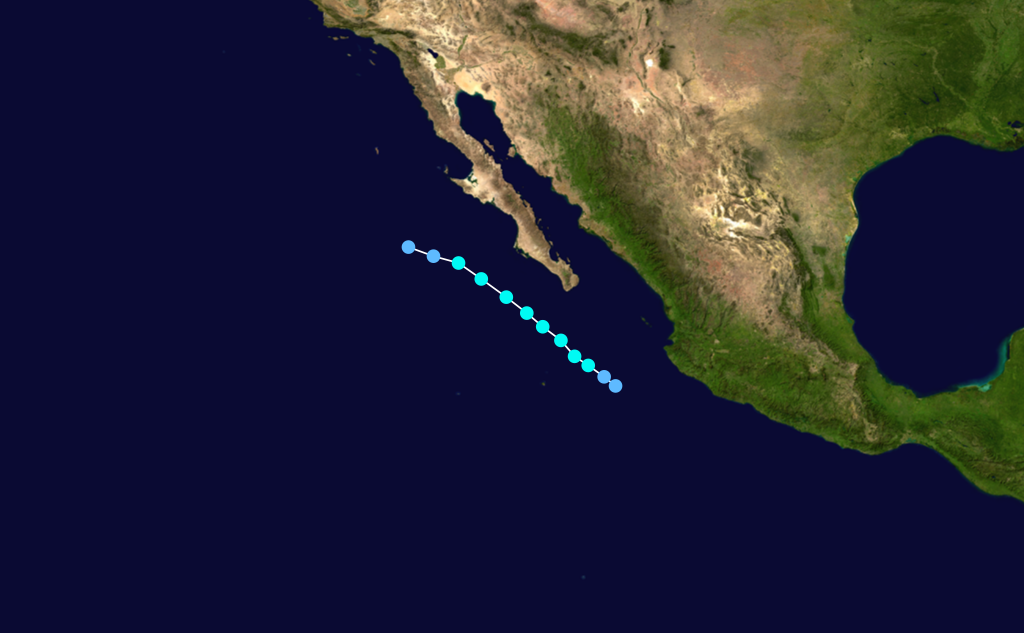
- Duration: August 7 – August 10
- Peak intensity: 65 mph (100 km/h) (1-min); 993 mbar (hPa)

On August 7, a tropical depression formed from a tropical wave a few hundred miles south of Baja California. It became Tropical Storm Hector quickly, and as it paralleled the coast of Mexico, it began to weaken, dissipating on August 10. No damage was reported anywhere.

Tropical Storm Hector was forecast to approach the Baja California Peninsula. A tropical storm watch was issued for part of the peninsula on August 8. It was lifted later the same day. Hector's most significant impact was rain. The tropical storm dumped rain along a discontinuous zone of coastal and inland Mexico. The highest point maxima were 7.87 inches (200 mm) at Cerro de Ortega/Ixtlahua and 7.60 inches (193 mm) at Caduano/Santiago. No damage or casualties were reported.

=== Tropical Depression One-C ===
- Tropical depression (SSHWS)
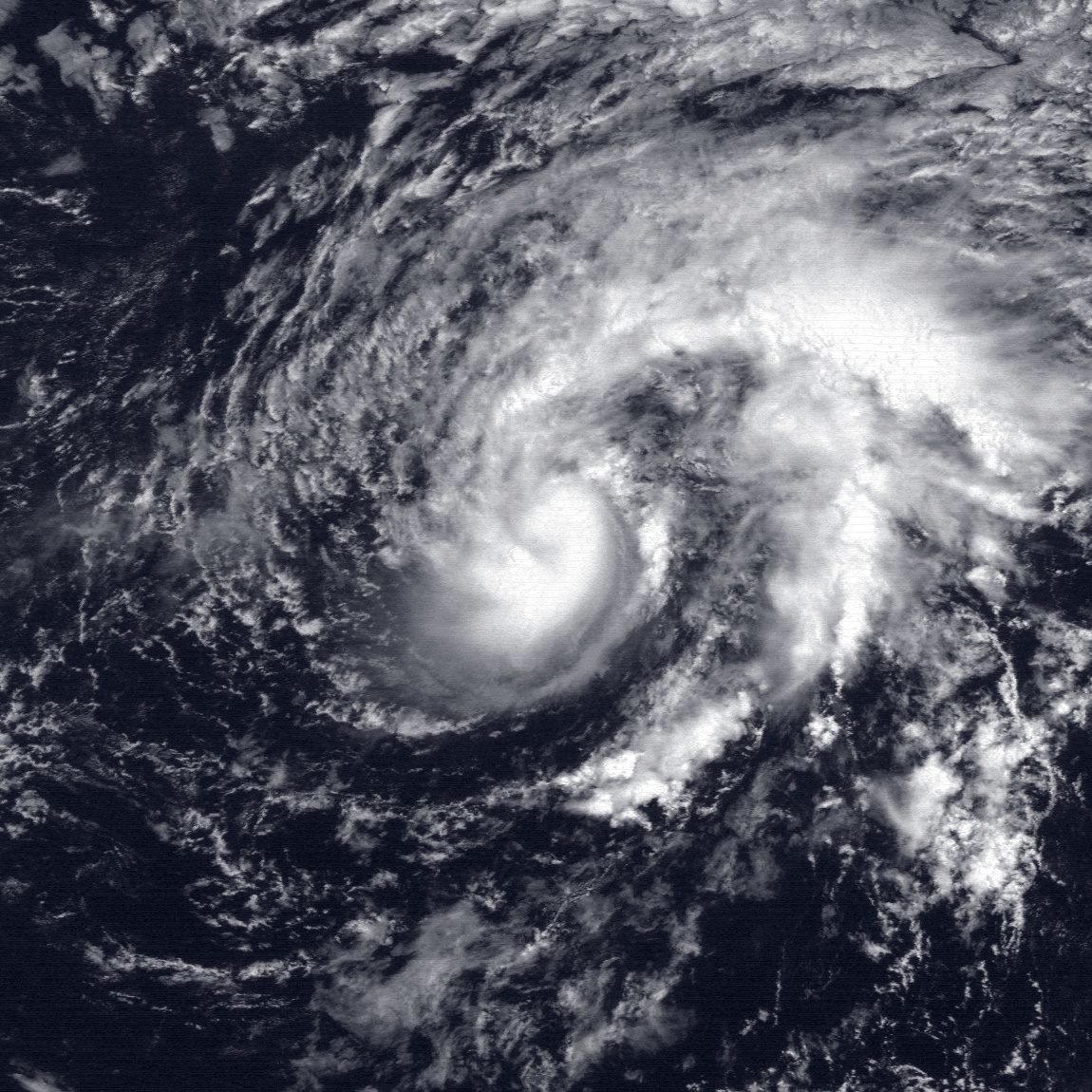
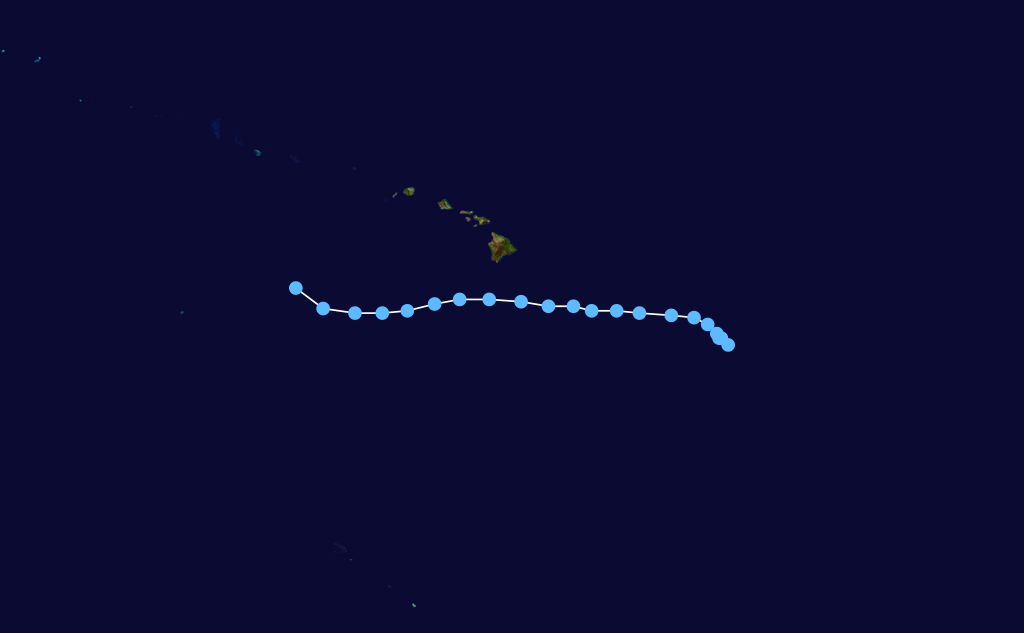
- Duration: August 9 – August 14
- Peak intensity: 35 mph (55 km/h) (1-min);

An area of disturbed weather organized into a tropical depression on August 9 while located 740 miles (1,190 km) southeast of Hilo, Hawaii. The depression moved westward without organizing, and dissipated on August 14.

Moisture from the system produced heavy rainfall over the island of Hawaii, totaling to over 15 inches (380 mm). The flooding closed all major roads in Hilo, and was considered the worst flooding in 40 years. The rainfall destroyed two homes and damaged 214, 14 severely. It also damaged roads and businesses. Damage throughout the island totaled to $5 million (1994 USD; $10.9 million 2026 USD). Flooding occurred in Maui as well, where landslides blocked portions of the Hana Highway. One-C's point maximum of 15 in (380 mm) makes it Hawaii's ninth wettest known tropical cyclone.

=== Hurricane Ileana ===
- Category 1 hurricane (SSHWS)
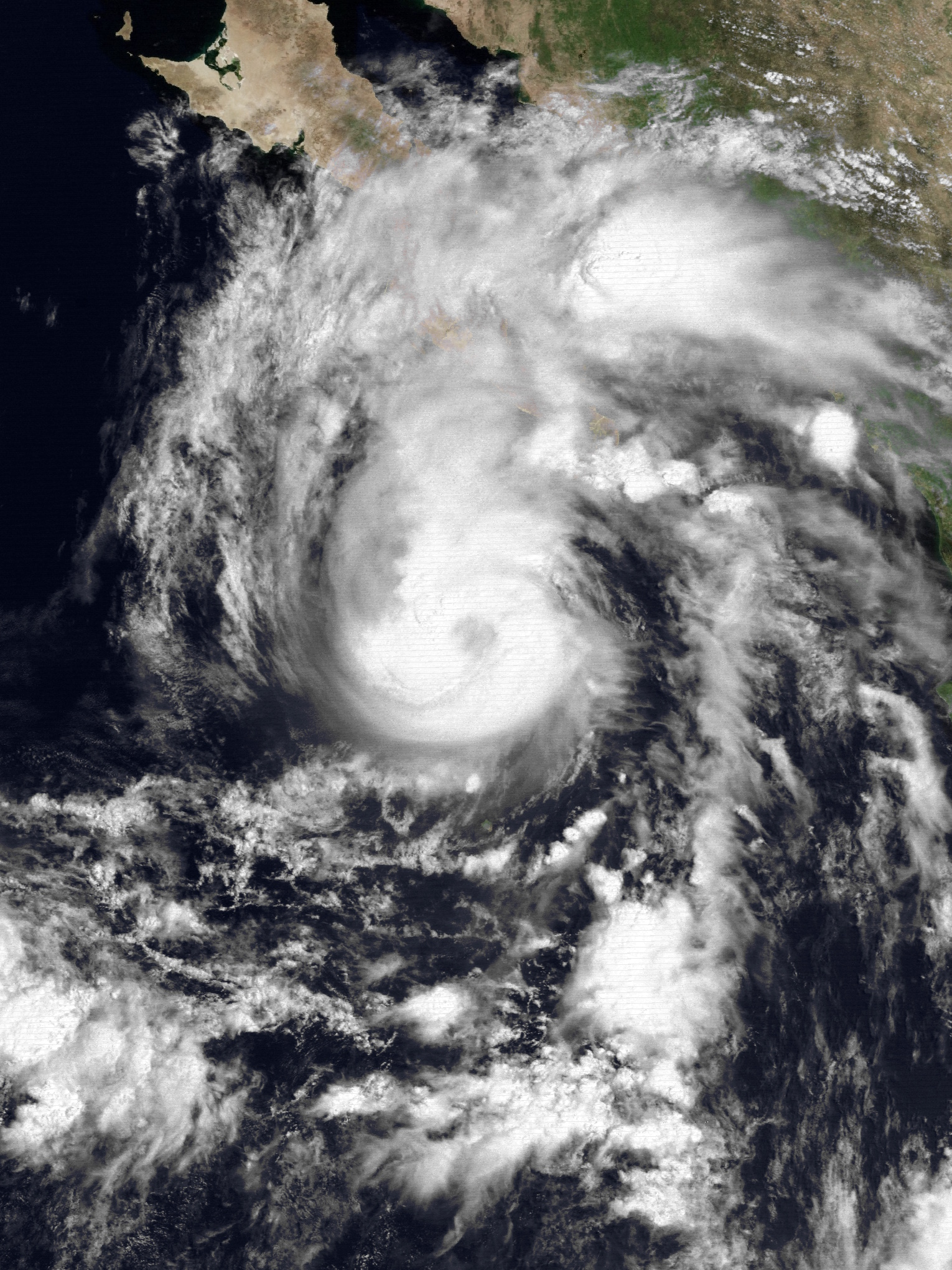
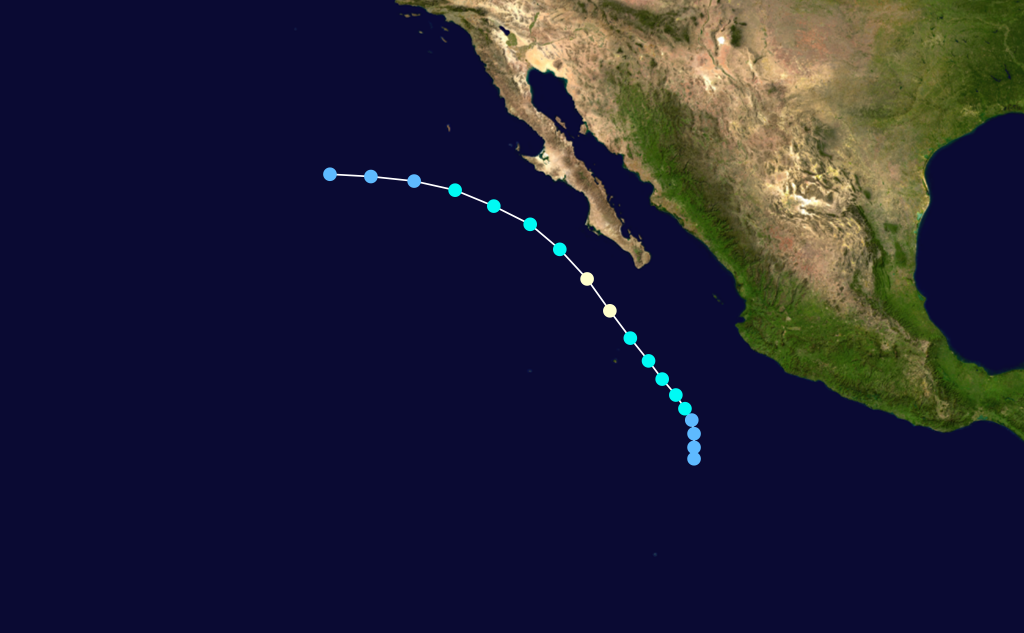
- Duration: August 10 – August 14
- Peak intensity: 75 mph (120 km/h) (1-min); 986 mbar (hPa)

A disturbance that was part of the Intertropical Convergence Zone developed several centers of circulation. After it organized, it separated from the ITCZ and became Tropical Depression Eleven-E on August 10 while the system was about 690 miles (1,110 km) south-southeast of the southern tip of the Baja California Peninsula. It was upgraded to Tropical Storm Ileana at the second advisory, at the same time as John, the next storm. An eye appeared, and Ileana became a hurricane on August 12. It began weakening almost immediately thereafter, as it passed over cooler waters and encountered increasing wind shear. Ileana was a tropical storm on August 13, and the next day it was a dissipating swirl low-level clouds located about 520 miles (840 km) west of Punta Eugenia.

=== Hurricane John ===
- Category 5 hurricane (SSHWS)
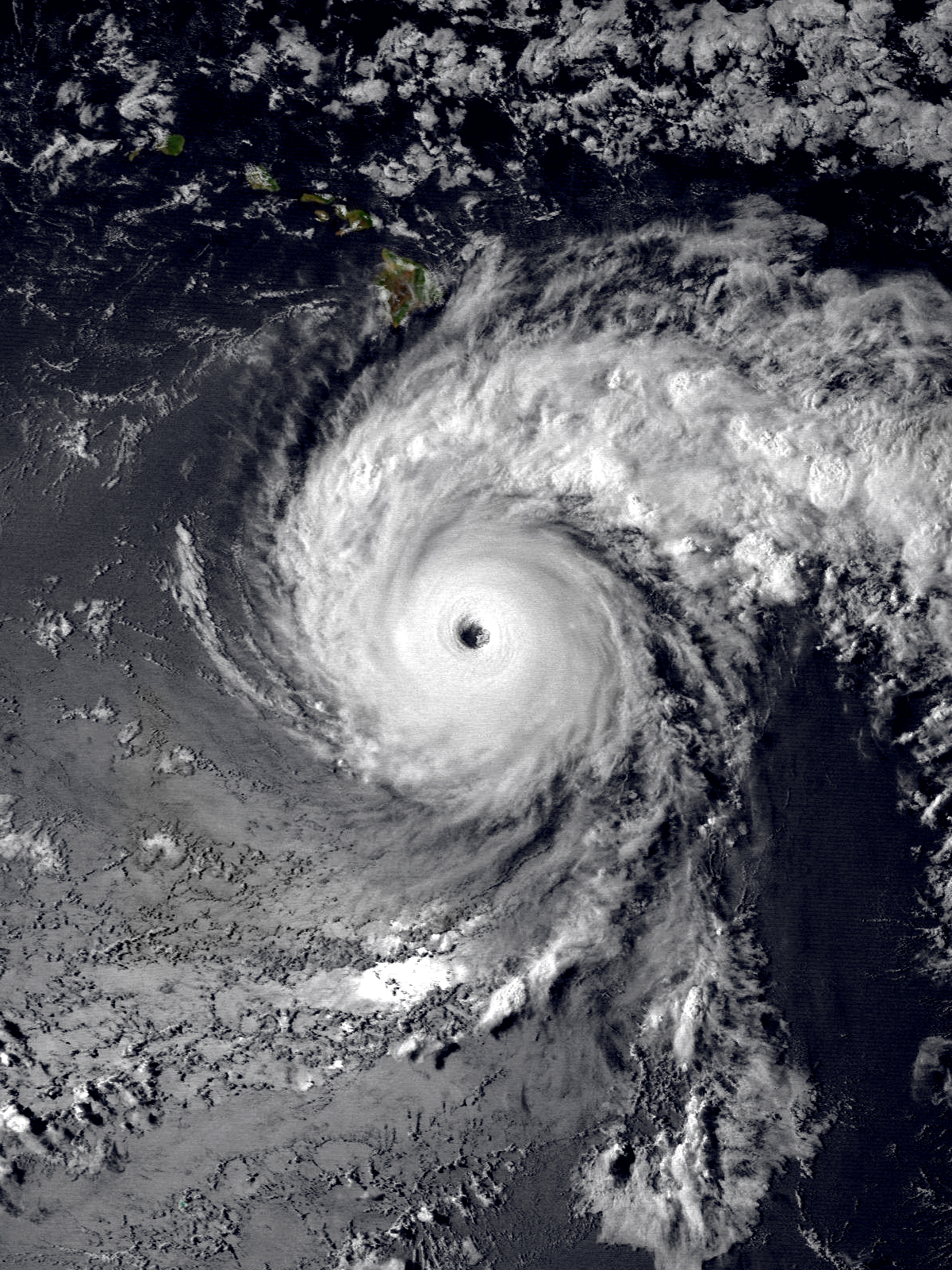
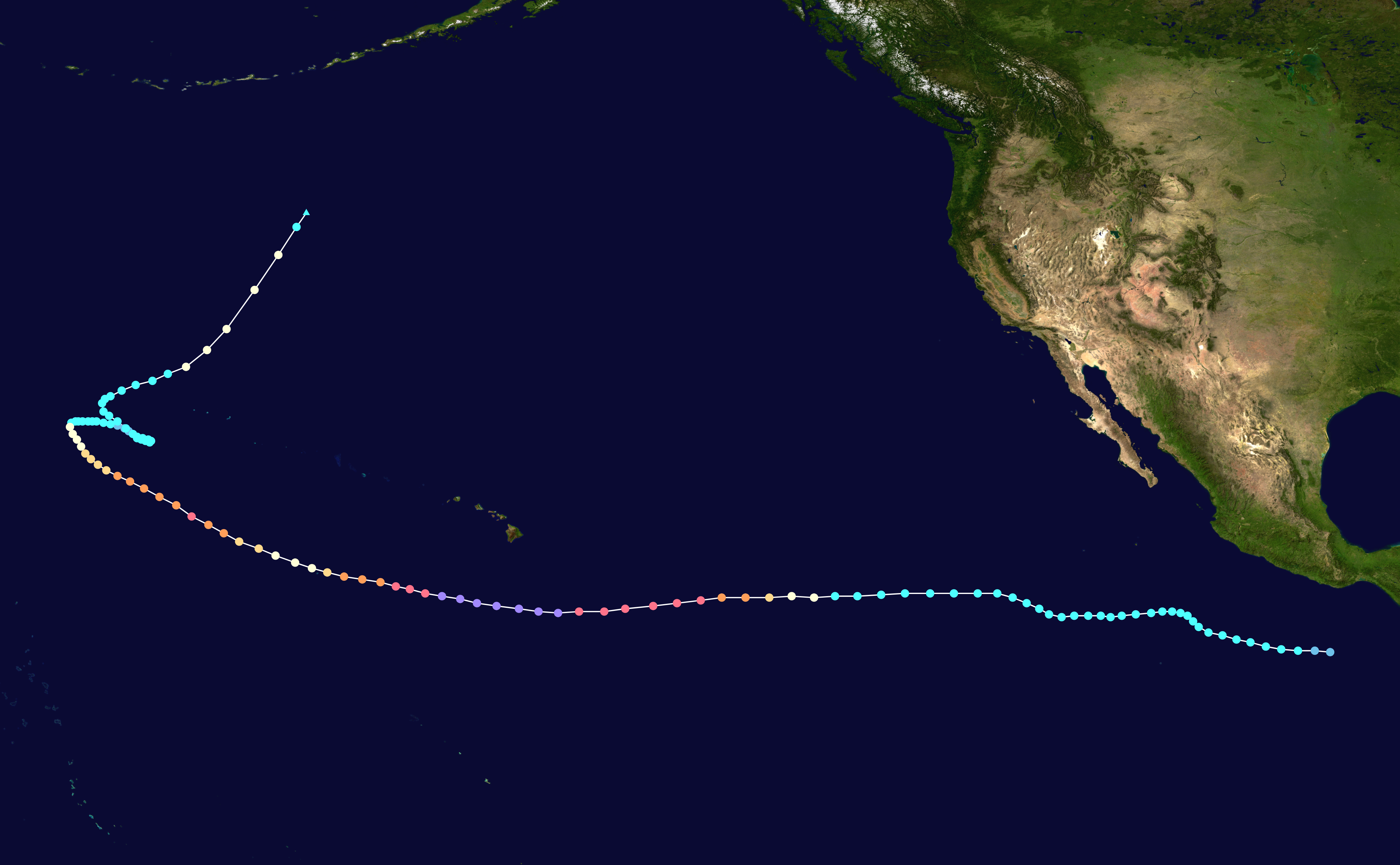
- Duration: August 11 – September 10 (Out of basin between August 28-September 8)
- Peak intensity: 175 mph (280 km/h) (1-min); 929 mbar (hPa)

Tropical Depression Ten-E formed on August 11 south of Mexico. It headed generally westward, and was upgraded into a tropical storm twelve hours after it formed and was named John. John fluctuated in strength as it headed west, always managing to stay at tropical storm strength. On August 20, steady intensification began, and John was a major hurricane when it entered the central Pacific. It continued westward, reaching Category 5 intensity on August 23. It passed around 245 miles (394 km) south of Hawaii, and passed just north of Johnston Atoll on August 26. John stayed at hurricane intensity until it crossed the dateline on August 28, becoming a typhoon of the 1994 Pacific typhoon season. After weakening into a tropical storm, John recurved, looped, and recurved again. It reintensified, and was a hurricane when it recrossed the dateline to reenter the central Pacific. John headed north-northeast until it went extratropical on September 10, thirty one days after it formed.

Ahead of the hurricane, the 1100 people at Johnston Atoll evacuated. On the atoll, John caused $15 million (1994 USD; $32.6 million 2026 USD) in damage. Other than on Johnston, Hurricane John had minor effects in Hawaii. Its remnants also affected Alaska.

Hurricane John was the longest lasting, until it was surpassed by Cyclone Freddy in 2023 and farthest traveling tropical cyclone on Earth in recorded history. It is also one of six tropical cyclones to exist in all three North Pacific Ocean tropical cyclone basins, and one of the few tropical cyclones to cross the International Dateline more than once.

=== Hurricane Kristy ===
- Category 2 hurricane (SSHWS)
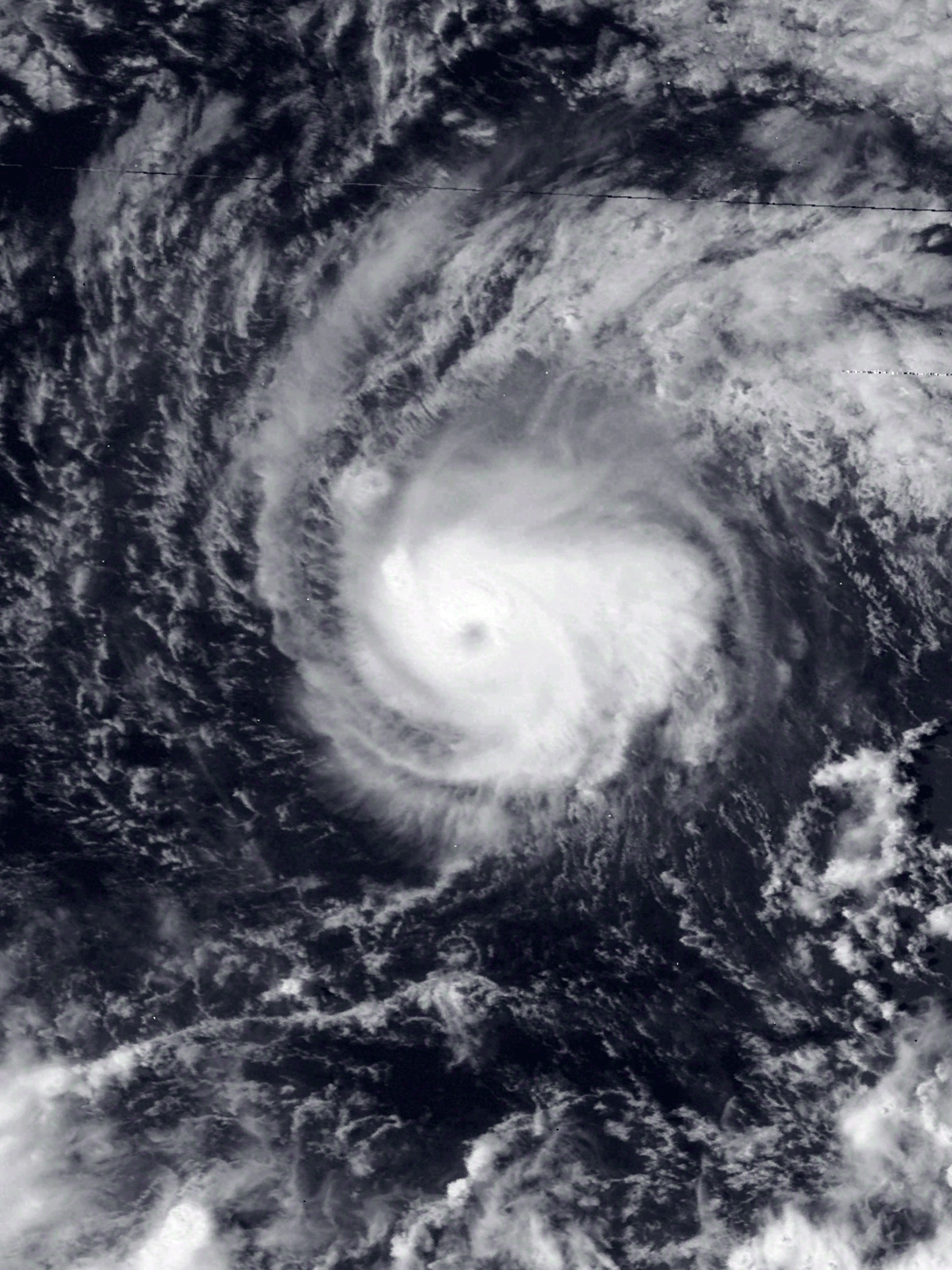
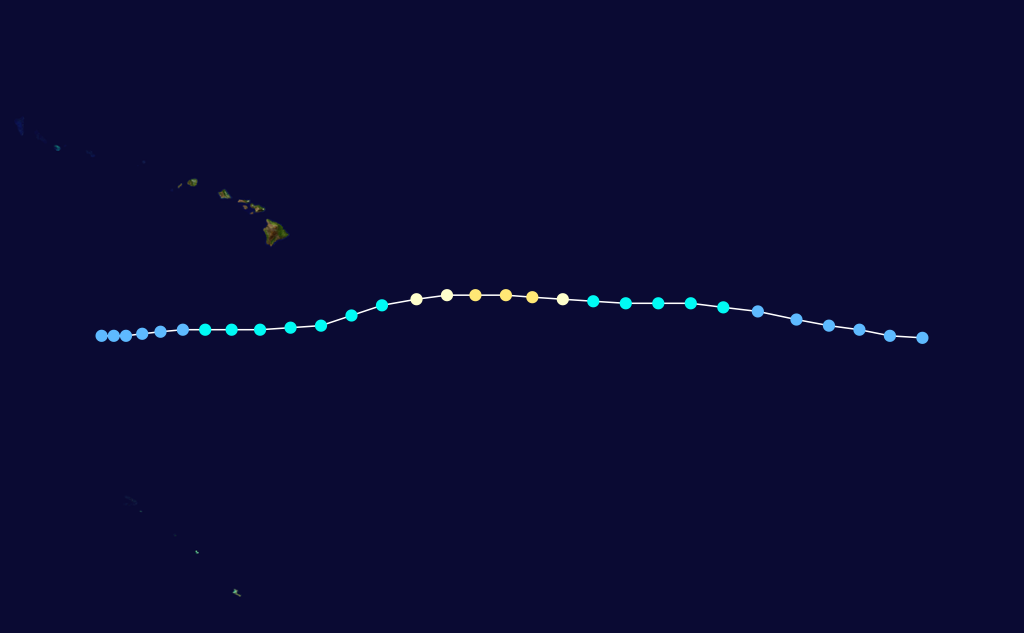
- Duration: August 28 – September 5
- Peak intensity: 105 mph (165 km/h) (1-min); ≤992 mbar (hPa)

On August 28, Tropical Depression Thirteen-E formed about 1,300 miles (2,100 km) southwest of Cabo San Lucas, Mexico. It was named Tropical Storm Kristy on August 30. As it crossed into the central Pacific, a banding-type eye formed and it became a hurricane. Twelve hours later, it reached Category 2 intensity. Kristy weakened steadily from that point due to wind shear. It passed about 300 miles (480 km) south of Hawaii, and dissipated on September 5. The lowest central pressure of Kristy is unknown. The last estimate was made when Kristy was still a tropical storm.

As it approached the Hawaiian Islands, a high surf advisory and a high wind warning were issued for the Big Island of Hawaii. Its remnants crossed 180th meridian very early on September 7 and was absorbed by a tropical depression which became Typhoon Melissa in the Western Pacific basin.

=== Hurricane Lane ===
- Category 4 hurricane (SSHWS)
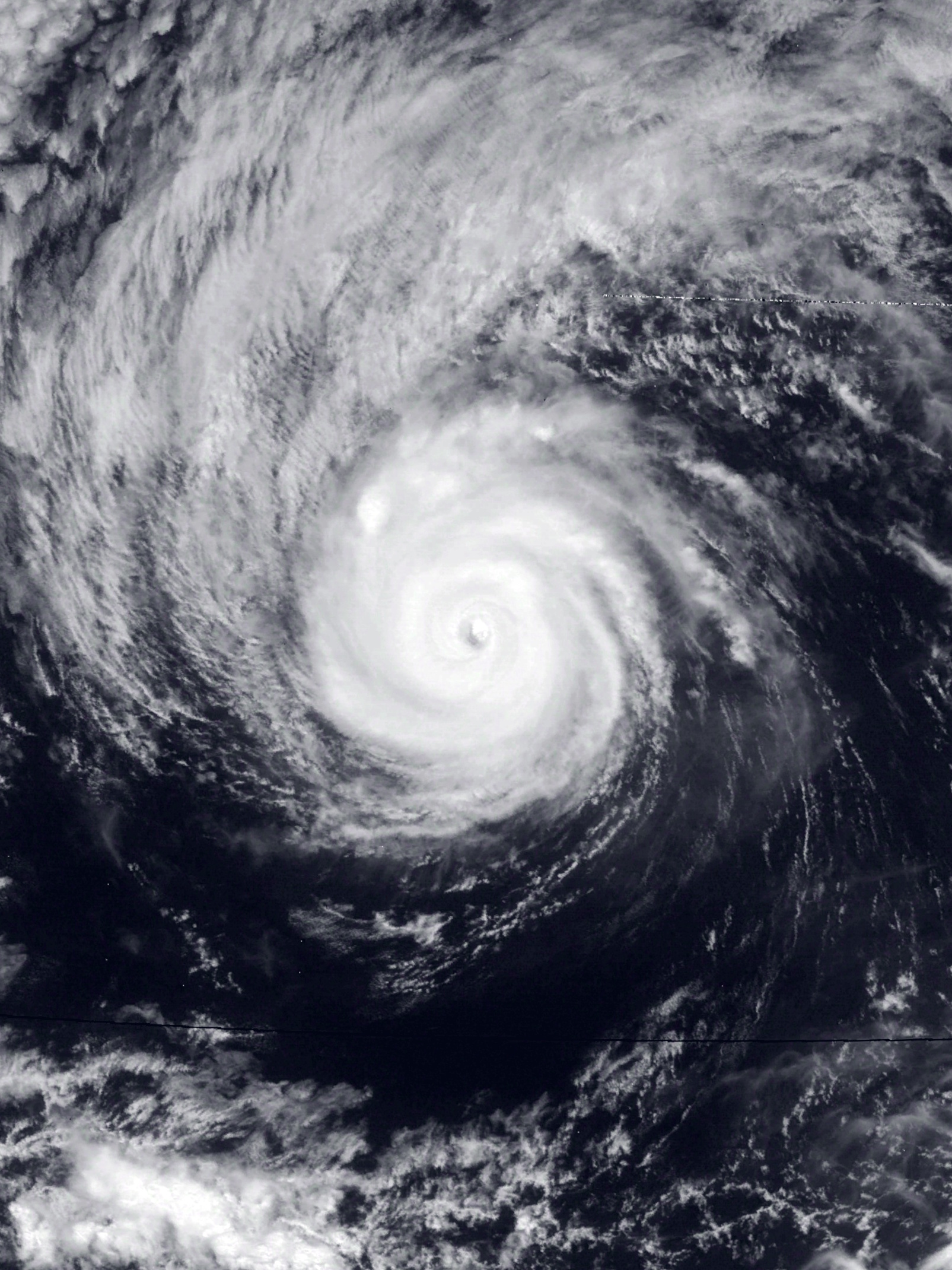
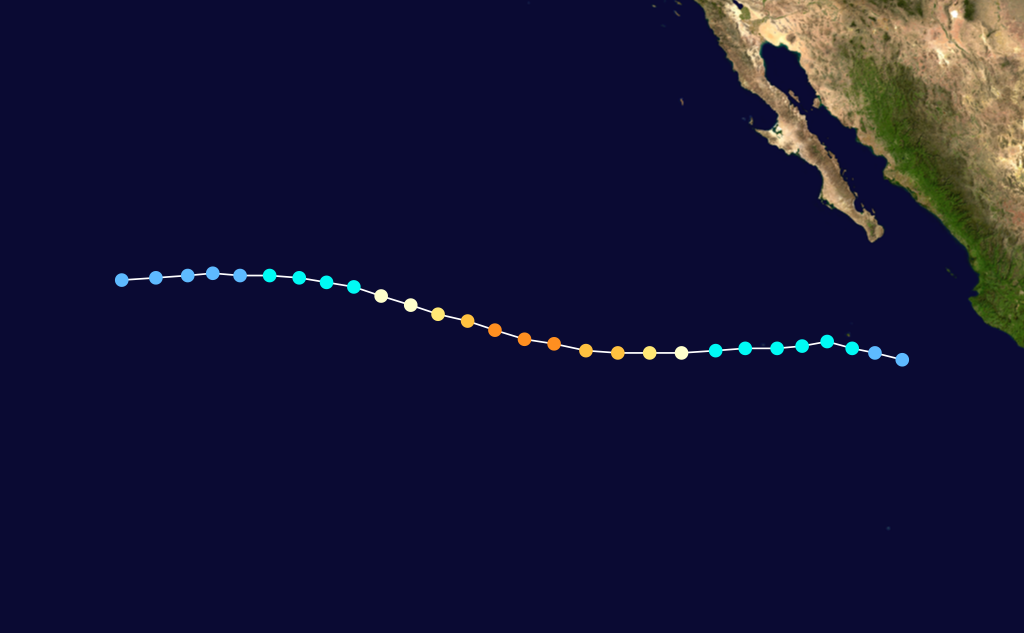
- Duration: September 3 – September 10
- Peak intensity: 130 mph (215 km/h) (1-min); 948 mbar (hPa)

The same tropical wave that spawned Tropical Depression Five in the Atlantic became Tropical Depression Fourteen-E on September 3. It quickly became Tropical Storm Lane. A high pressure ridge centered itself north of Lane, keeping the storm on a westward track. This brought Lane into very favorable conditions, and Lane intensified. When the tropical storm reached hurricane strength, it entered a phase of rapid intensification, reaching winds of about 135 mph (217 km/h), making it a category four hurricane. The high pressure ridge shifted eastward, and allowed Lane to enter unfavorable conditions. Lane dissipated on September 10.

=== Tropical Storm Mele ===
- Tropical storm (SSHWS)
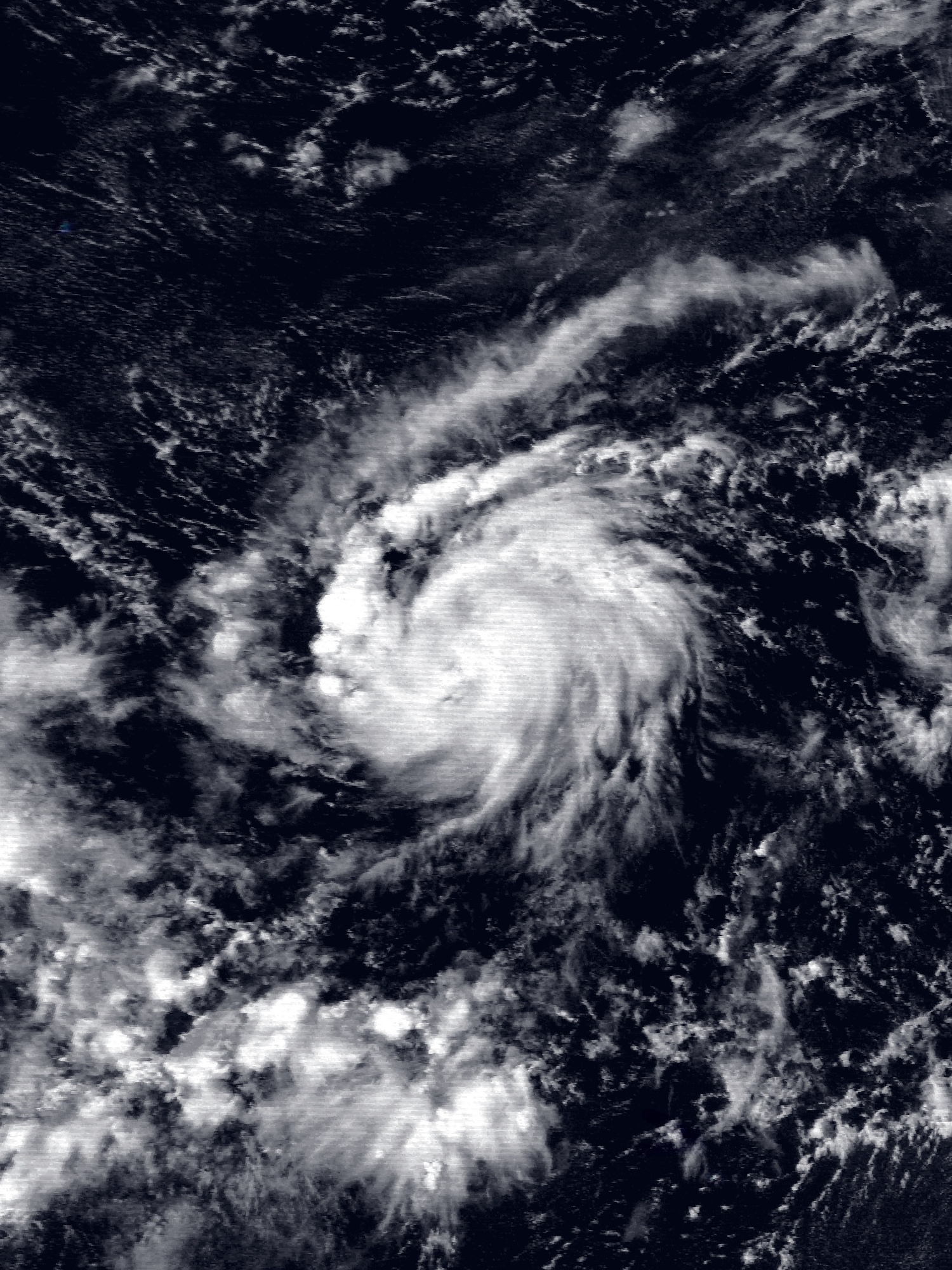
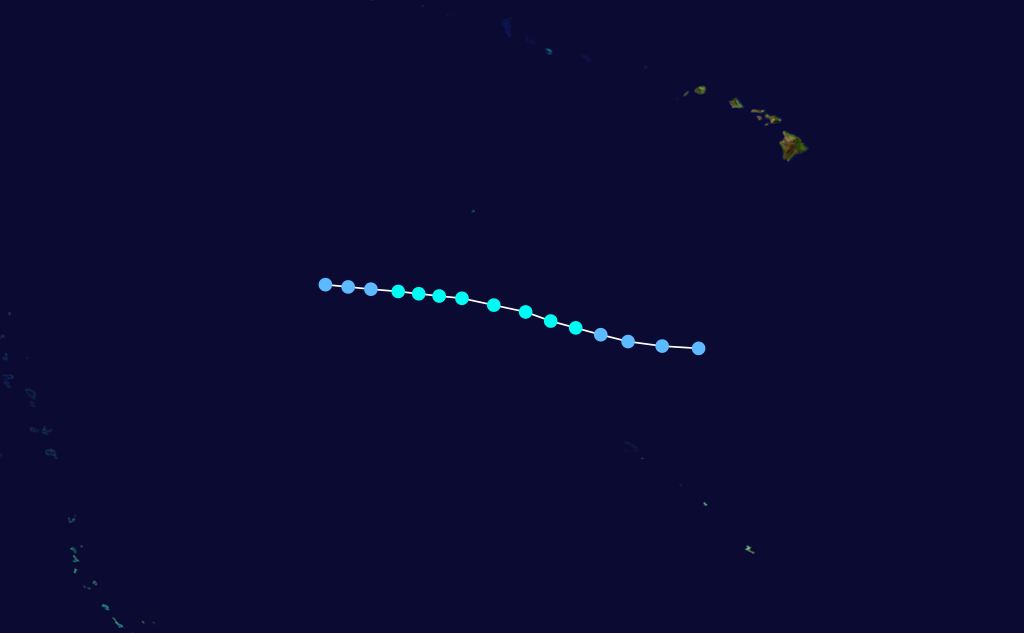
- Duration: September 6 – September 9
- Peak intensity: 40 mph (65 km/h) (1-min);

A tropical disturbance became Tropical Depression Two-C on September 6. It reached tropical storm strength the next day, being named Mele. The name Mele means "song" in the Hawaiian language and is also the Hawaiian form of "Mary". Mele headed west-northwest and weakened back into a tropical depression on September 9. It dissipated later that day without incident.

=== Tropical Storm Miriam ===
- Tropical storm (SSHWS)
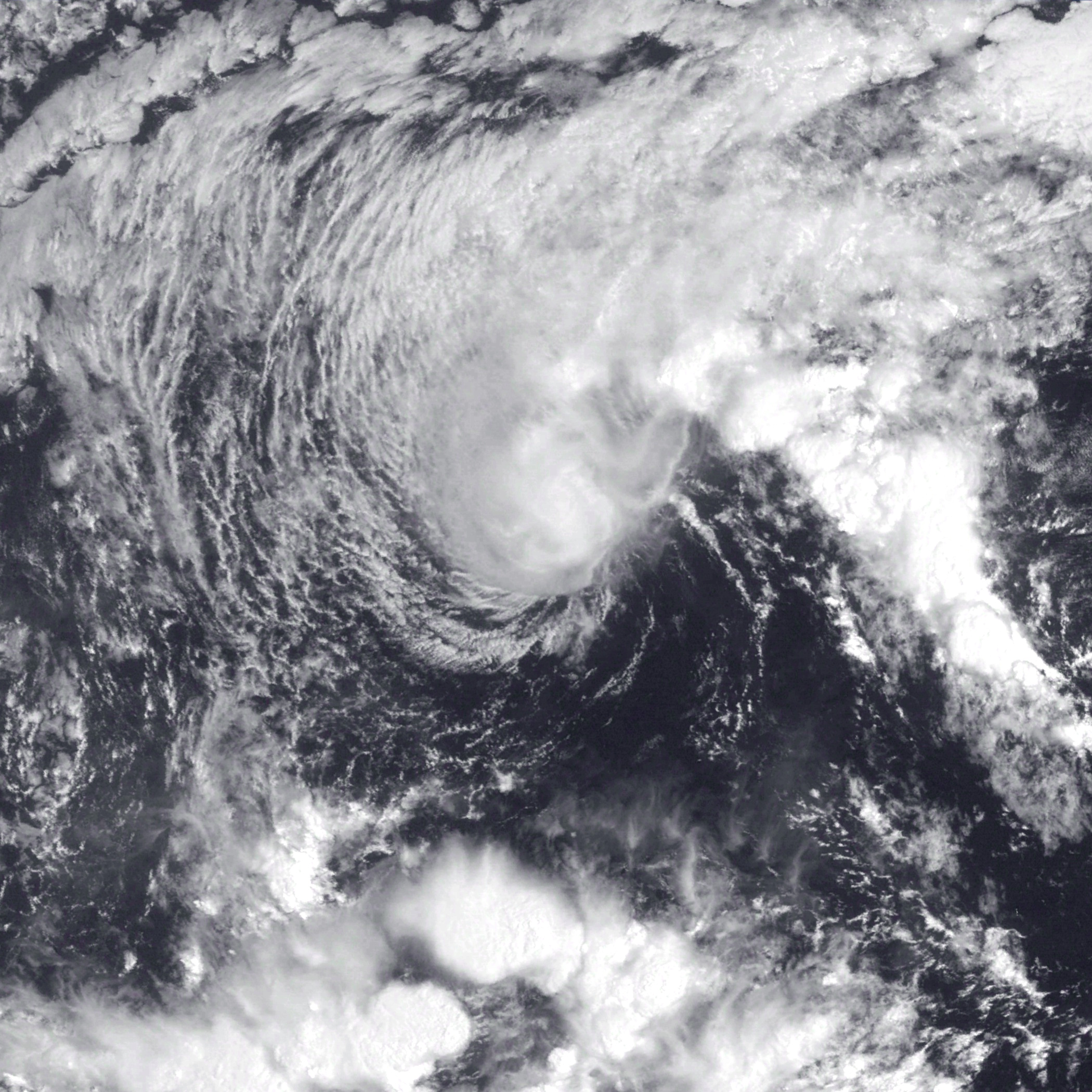
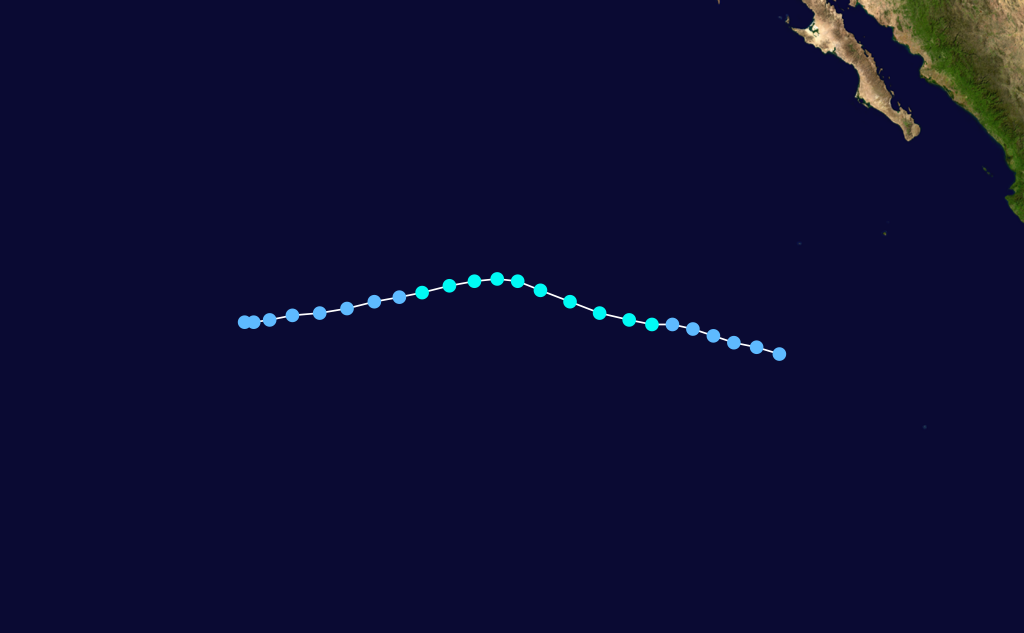
- Duration: September 15 – September 21
- Peak intensity: 45 mph (75 km/h) (1-min); 1002 mbar (hPa)

Miriam formed from a weak disturbance on September 15. It strengthened slightly into Tropical Storm Miriam, and dissipated on September 21, having led an uneventful life without impact. In an interesting occurrence, the low-level remnants of Miriam were still visible for weeks after the storm dissipated near 140°W.

=== Tropical Storm Norman ===
- Tropical storm (SSHWS)
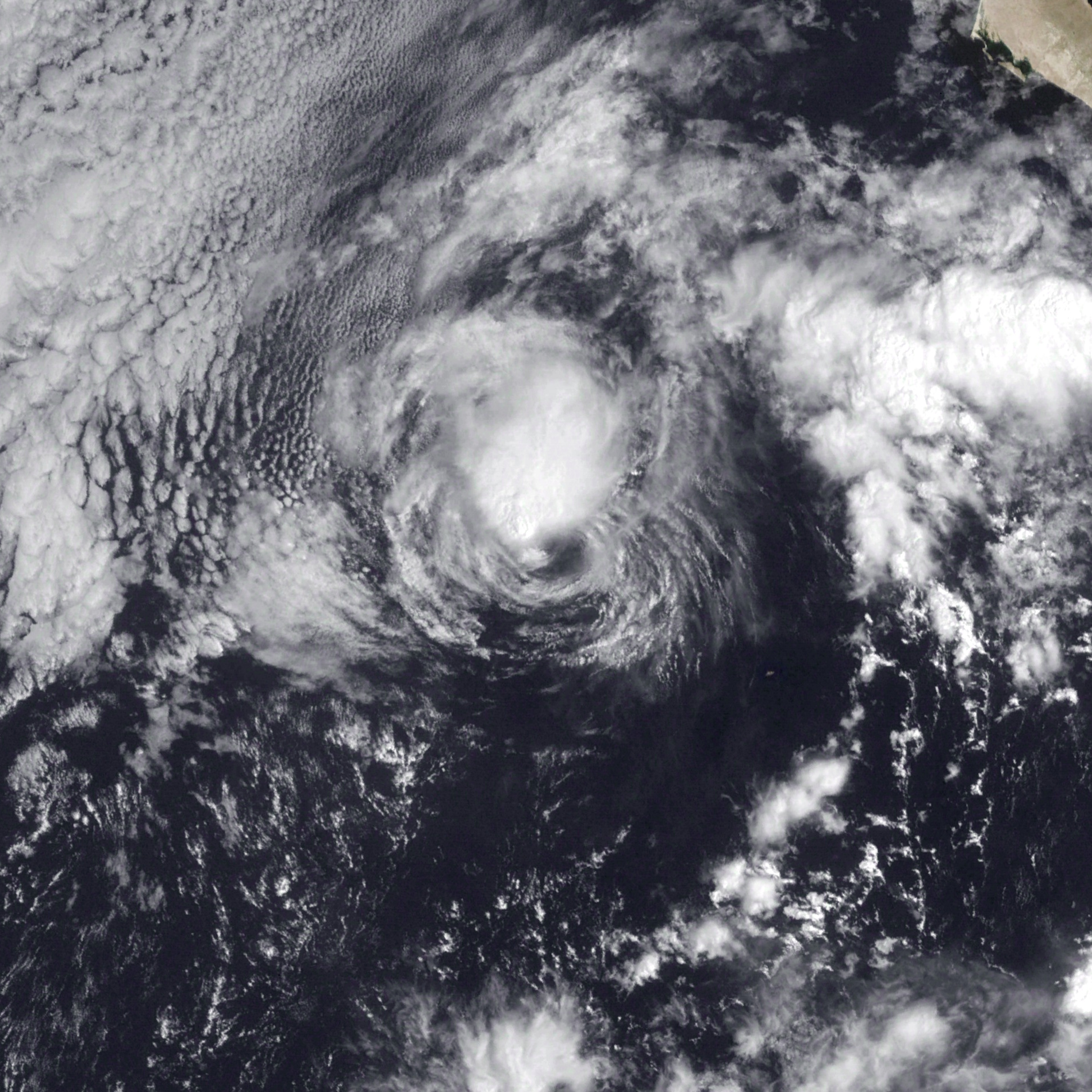
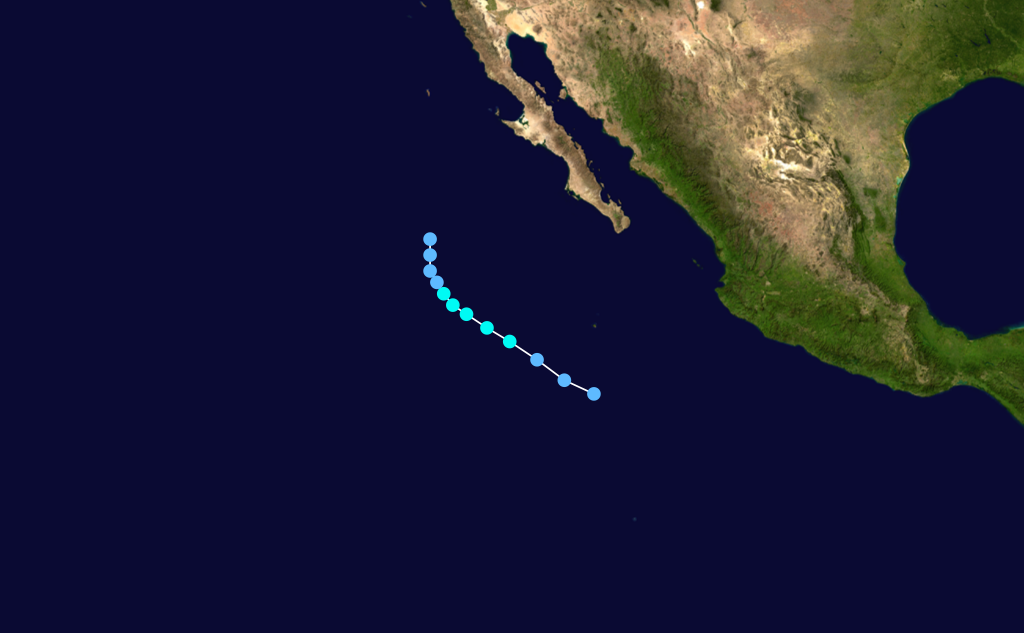
- Duration: September 19 – September 22
- Peak intensity: 40 mph (65 km/h) (1-min); 1004 mbar (hPa)

A tropical depression formed on September 19, and became Tropical Storm Norman the next day. After tracking northwest, it began to turn north in response to a trough, and convection began to diminish. Norman dissipated on September 22.

=== Hurricane Olivia ===
- Category 4 hurricane (SSHWS)
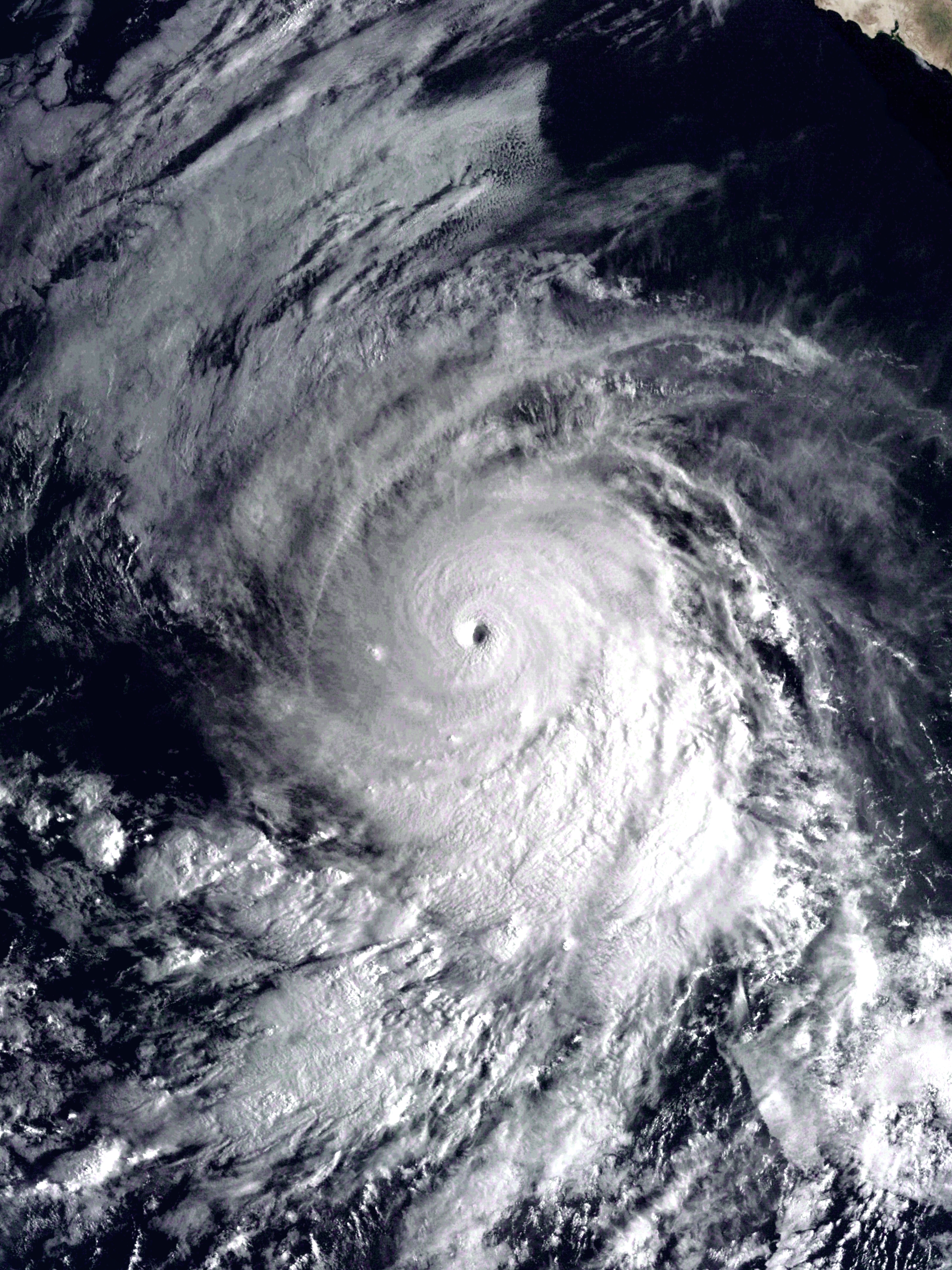
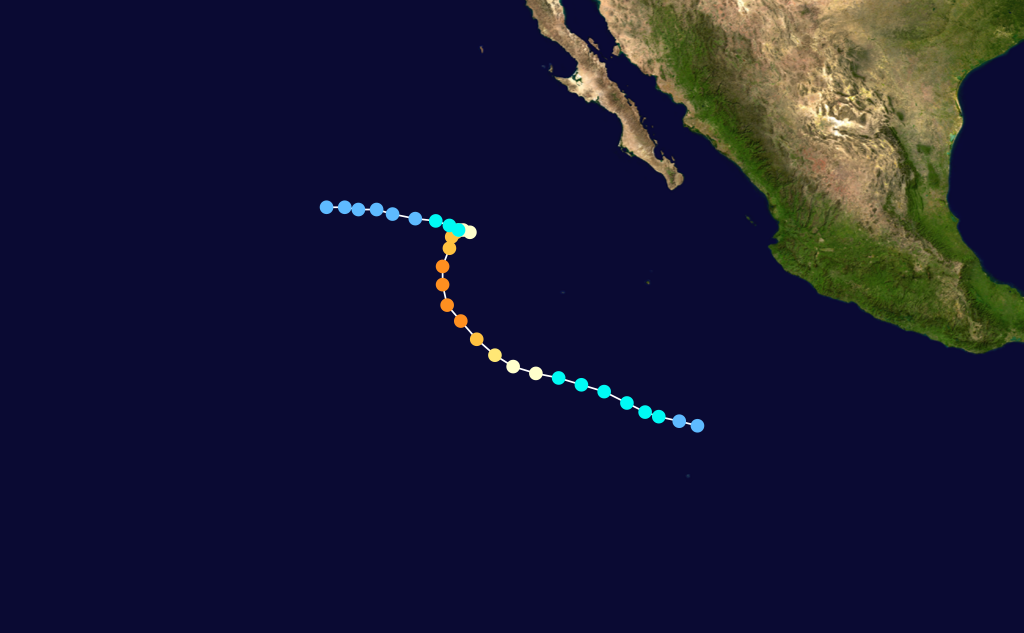
- Duration: September 22 – September 29
- Peak intensity: 150 mph (240 km/h) (1-min); 923 mbar (hPa)

Hurricane Olivia ultimately formed from a disturbance that had separated from the Intertropical Convergence Zone and become distinct by September 19. The disturbance slowly headed westward and it organized into a tropical depression on September 22 while located about 720 miles (1,160 km) south of the southern tip of the Baja California Peninsula. The depression headed west-northwestwards and strengthened into Tropical Storm Olivia on September 22. It steadily intensified and was a hurricane on September 24. It then rapidly strengthened into a powerful major hurricane. It slowly curled to the northwest as it was observed by NOAA research aircraft. Olivia peaked in intensity on September 25. Meanwhile, a large cyclone off the extreme southern part of California induced a northward path. As Olivia started a small anticyclonic loop, wind shear began to weaken the hurricane. When Olivia was finished the loop, it had weakened to a tropical storm. It then headed westward. It weakened into a tropical depression on September 28 and dissipated the next day.

At the time, Olivia was the third-most intense Pacific hurricane on record; it has since dropped to eleventh. The storm also had the lowest barometric pressure of a Category 4 Pacific hurricane on record. Hurricane Juliette in 2001 joined Olivia as the most intense Category 4 hurricane on record. Hurricane Odile in 2014 beat both storms when it attained a minimum pressure of 918 mbars. At the time, Olivia was also the most intense September hurricane, but was surpassed by Hurricane Linda in 1997, and is currently the third most intense September hurricane in the Pacific basin.

=== Tropical Storm Paul ===
- Tropical storm (SSHWS)
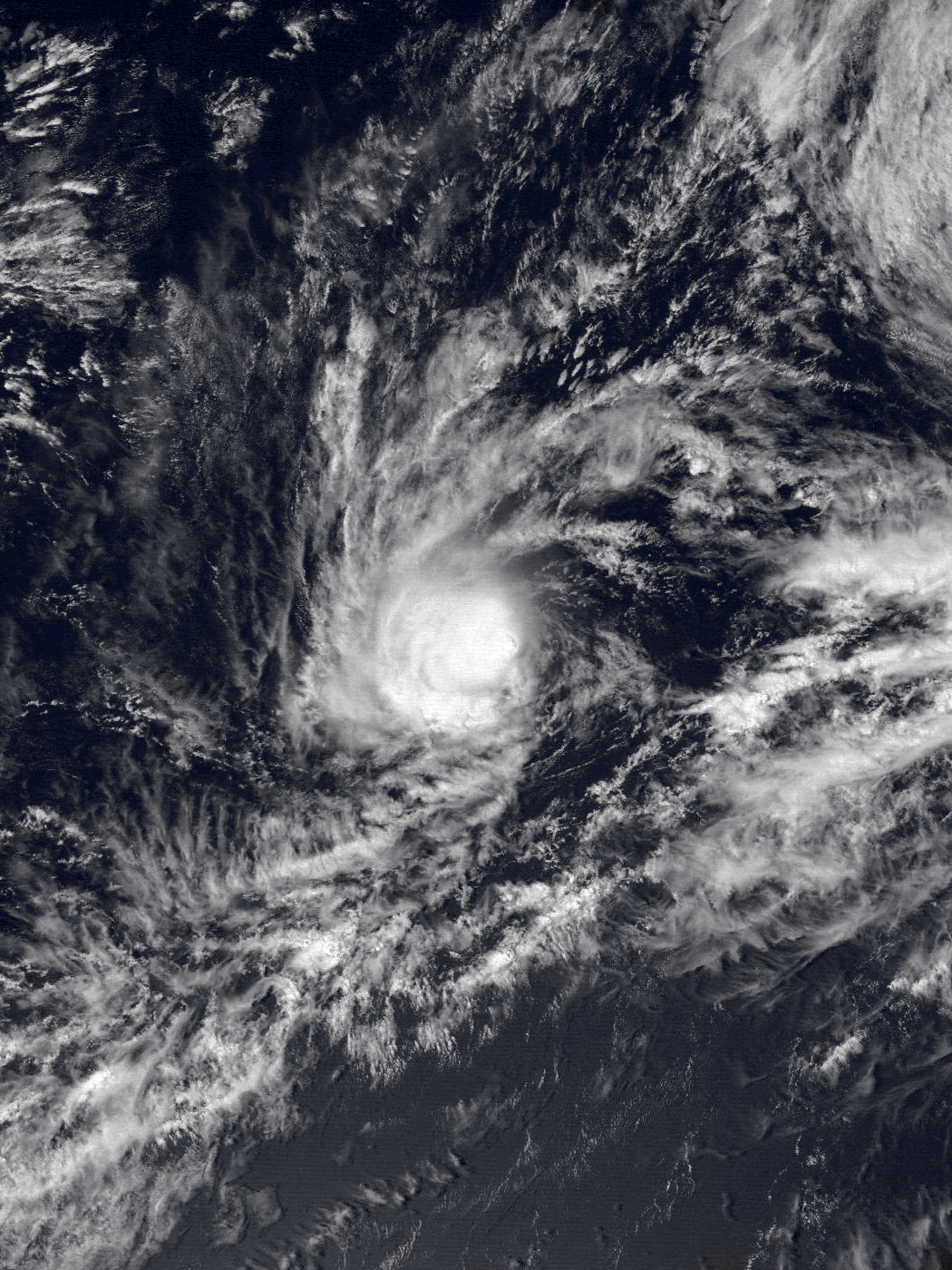
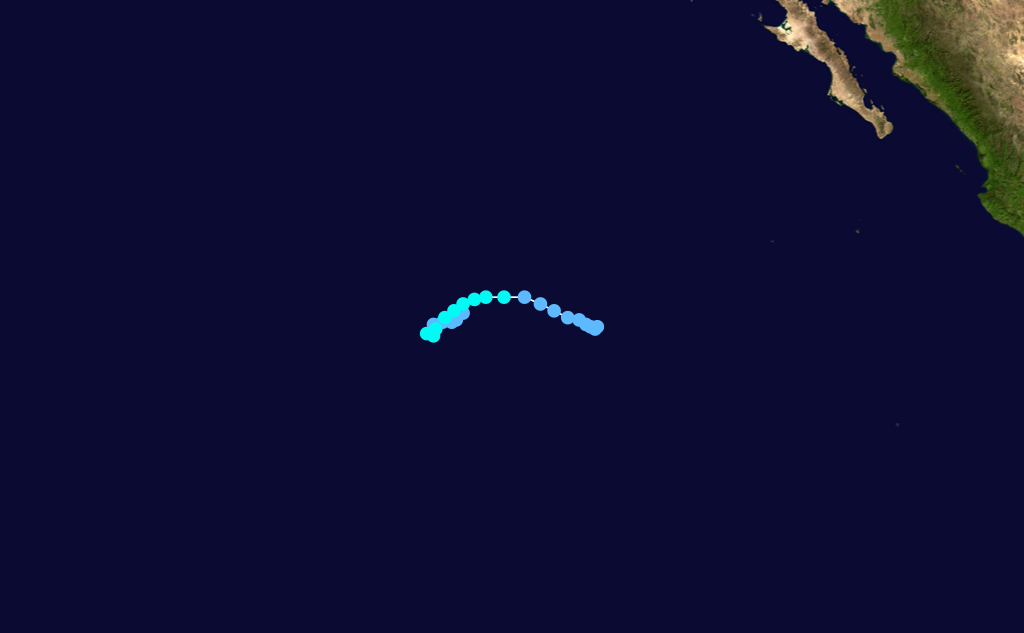
- Duration: September 24 – September 30
- Peak intensity: 45 mph (75 km/h) (1-min); 1003 mbar (hPa)

A nearly stationary cluster of thunderstorms and convection that had been hanging around since September 15 and escaped destruction by Tropical Storm Miriam organized into Tropical Depression Eighteen-E on September 24. It was located between Miriam's remnants and the developing Olivia. It became Tropical Storm Paul on the afternoon of September 25. It peaked in intensity on September 27. Then, upper outflow from the nearby Olivia started shearing the tropical cyclone. Paul had been completely destroyed by September 30.

=== Hurricane Rosa ===
- Category 2 hurricane (SSHWS)
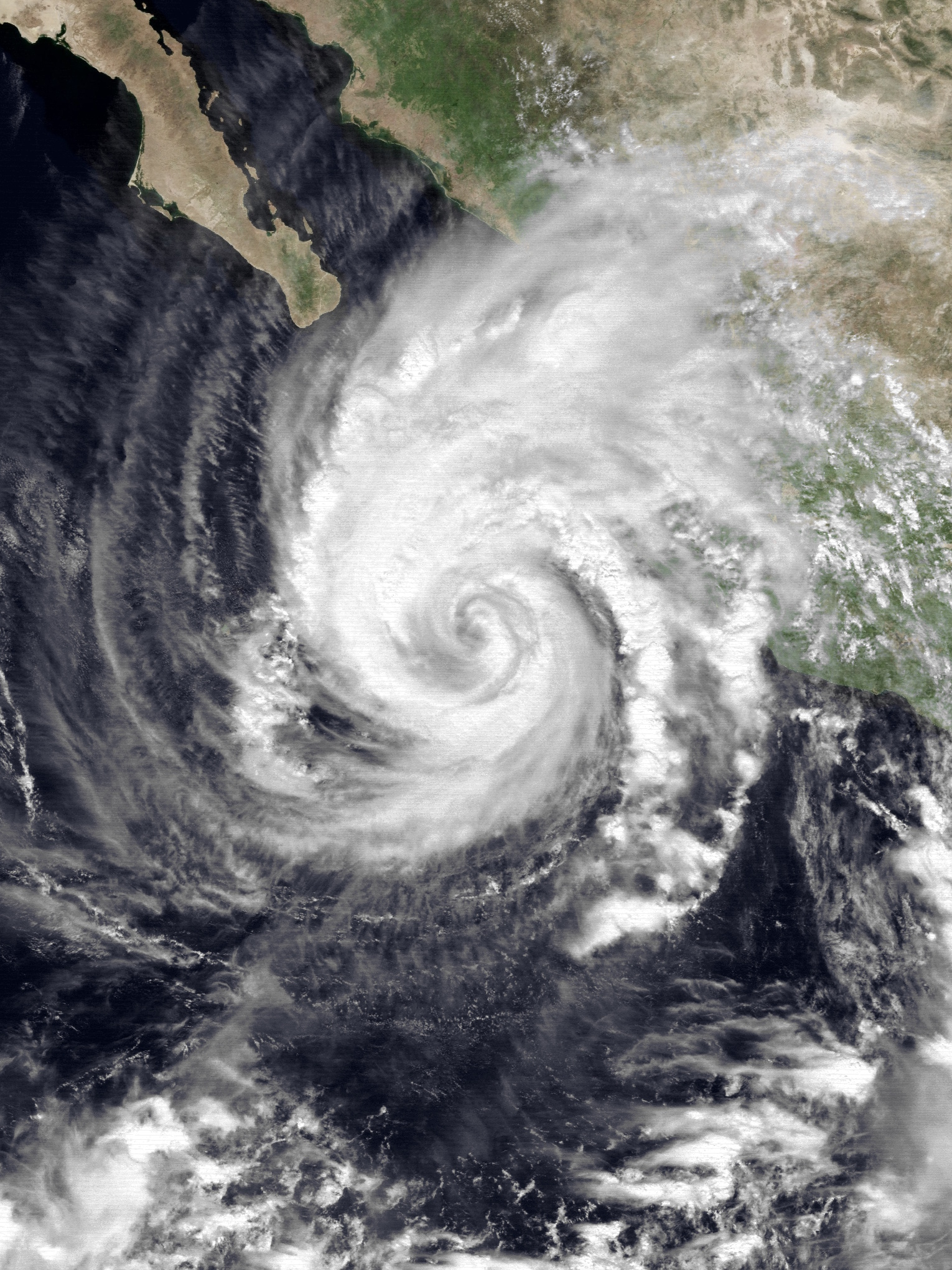
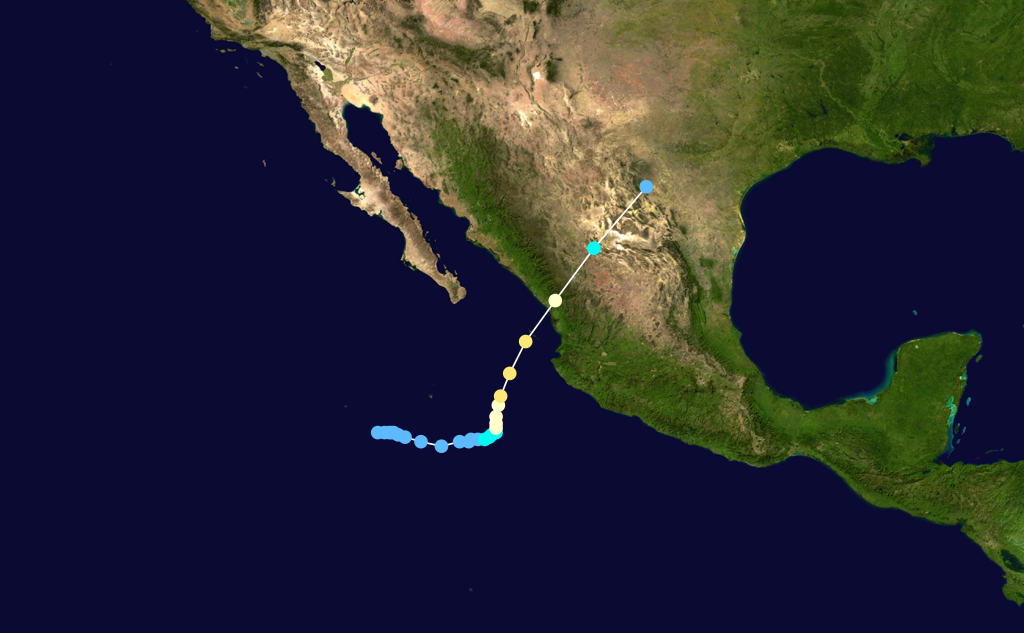
- Duration: October 8 – October 15
- Peak intensity: 105 mph (165 km/h) (1-min); 974 mbar (hPa)

An area of disturbed weather organized into a tropical depression at midday on October 8. It had trouble organizing, and advisories were discontinued for a while. The cyclone finally became a tropical storm on October 11 and was named Rosa. It moved glacially, but eventually a trough steered Rosa north and then northeast. Rosa intensified quickly, peaking at Category 2 intensity just before landfall near La Concepción on the morning of October 14. Rosa quickly decayed over the mountains of Mexico, and its cloud shield rapidly accelerated northward through the United States, spreading moisture.

On October 12, a hurricane watch was issued for the coast from Culiacán to Manzanillo and the Baja California Peninsula south of latitude 24°N. At the same time, a tropical storm warning was issued from Manzanillo to Tepic. On October 14, a hurricane warning was issued for the coast between Culiacán and Cabo Corrientes, Jalisco, and a tropical storm warning south of Cabo Corrientes to Manzanillo. All watches and warnings were lifted later that day.

Four deaths, two in each of Nayarit and Durango, were reported. Four people were missing in Sinaloa. All of the deaths were due to drowning. More than 100,000 people had their homes damaged in Nayarit. Telephone poles and power lines were downed in Sinaloa. Rain caused landslides and flash-flooding in mountainous areas. In Jalisco, mudslides forced the evacuation of 400 people from two coastal villages. The highest rainfall total in Mexico was 14.09 inches (358 mm) at Mesa de Pedro Pablo. The moisture Rosa sent into the United States was a contributing factor in record rains in parts of southeastern Texas from October 15 to 19. Those rains caused flooding that killed 22 people, destroyed over 3000 homes, and caused US$700 million in damage.

=== Tropical Storm Nona ===
- Tropical storm (SSHWS)
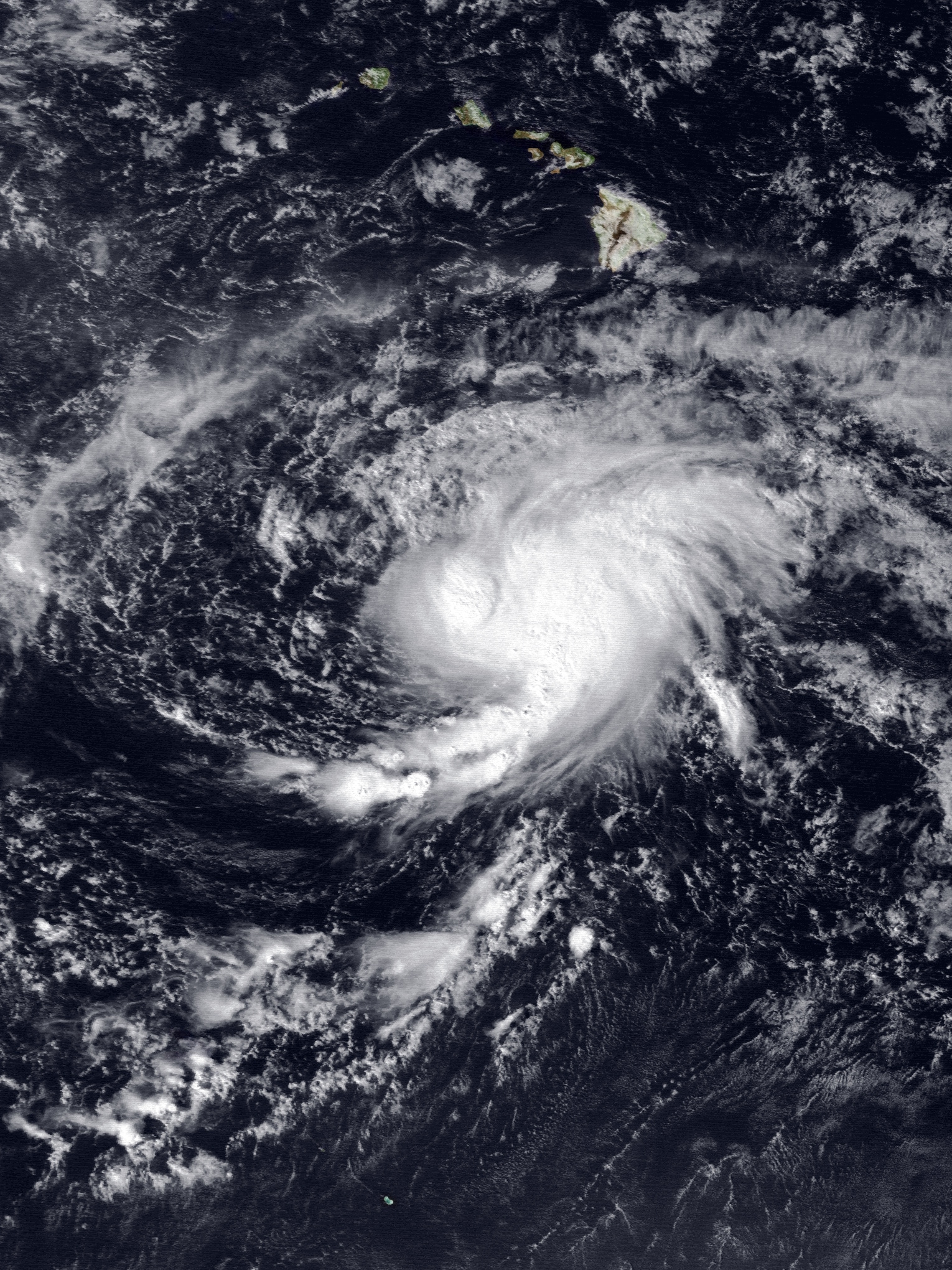
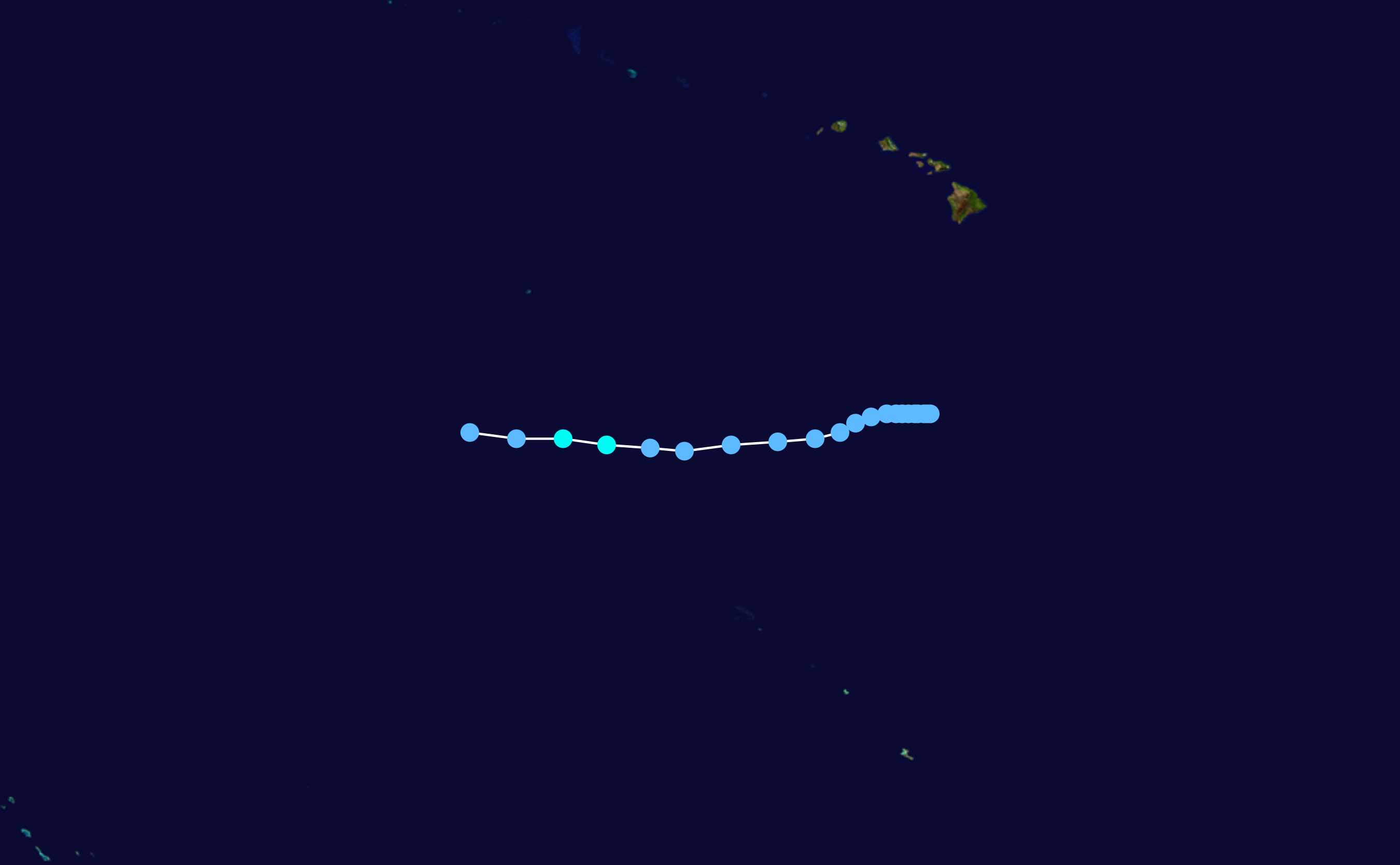
- Duration: October 21 – October 26
- Peak intensity: 40 mph (65 km/h) (1-min);

Tropical Depression Three-C formed on October 21 in the Central Pacific basin. It traveled westward for about 4 days before strengthening to Tropical Storm Nona on October 25. The name "Nona" is Hawaiian for the Latin name spelled the same way. Within six hours of reaching tropical storm status, Nona weakened back into a tropical depression. Upper-level westerlies from a nearby trough destroyed the depression on October 26.

=== Other systems ===
On August 14, an area of convection organized enough to be considered a tropical depression. It was steered by John's circulation, and it was never expected to strengthen much because it was close to cool waters. The cyclone drifted north, then northeast, north again, northwest, and then west. The National Hurricane Center declared the depression dissipated on August 15.

According to the Joint Typhoon Warning Center and Japan Meteorological Agency, on October 21, a tropical depression formed west of the International Date Line, and soon exited CPHC's area of responsibility. The system subsequently became Tropical Storm Yuri.

== Storm names ==
The following list of names was used for named storms that formed in the North Pacific Ocean east of 140°W in 1994. This is the same list used for the 1988 season, except for Ileana, which replaced Iva, and which was used for the first time in 1994. No names were retired from this list following the season, and it was used again for the 2000 season.

- Aletta
- Bud
- Carlotta
- Daniel *
- Emilia *
- Fabio *
- Gilma *
- Hector
- Ileana
- John *
- Kristy *
- Lane *
- Miriam
- Norman
- Olivia
- Paul
- Rosa
- Sergio (unused)
- Tara (unused)
- Vicente (unused)
- Willa (unused)
- Xavier (unused)
- Yolanda (unused)
- Zeke (unused)

For storms that form in the North Pacific from 140°W to the International Date Line, the names come from a series of four rotating lists. Names are used one after the other without regard to year, and when the bottom of one list is reached, the next named storm receives the name at the top of the next list. Three named storms, listed below, formed in the central North Pacific in 1994. Named storms in the table above that crossed into the area during the year are noted (*).

- Li
- Mele
- Nona

== Season effects ==
This is a table of all of the tropical cyclones that formed in the 1994 Pacific hurricane season. It includes their name, duration (within the basin), peak classification and intensities, areas affected, damage, and death totals. Deaths in parentheses are additional and indirect (an example of an indirect death would be a traffic accident), but were still related to that storm. Damage and deaths include totals while the storm was extratropical, a wave, or a low, and all of the damage figures are in 1994 USD.

1994 Pacific hurricane season statistics
Storm name	Dates active	Storm category at peak intensity	Max 1-min wind mph (km/h)	Min. press. (mbar)	Areas affected	Damage (US$)	Deaths	Ref(s).
Aletta	June 18 –23	Tropical storm	50 (80)	999	None	None	None	
Bud	June 27–29	Tropical storm	45 (75)	1003	None	None	None	
Carlotta	June 28 – July 5	Category 2 hurricane	105 (165)	967	Socorro Island, Revillagigedo Islands	None	None	
Daniel	July 8–14	Tropical storm	65 (100)	993	Hawaiian Islands	None	None	
Emilia	July 16–25	Category 5 hurricane	160 (260)	926	Hawaii	Minimal	None	
Fabio	July 19–24	Tropical storm	45 (75)	1002	Hawaii	None	None	
Gilma	July 21–31	Category 5 hurricane	160 (260)	920	Johnston Atoll	Minimal	None	
Li	July 31 – August 18	Category 1 hurricane	75 (120)	1007	Hawaiian Islands, Johnston Atoll (before crossover)	None	None	
Hector	August 7–10	Tropical storm	65 (100)	993	Revillagigedo Islands, Baja California Peninsula	Minimal	None	
One-C	August 9–14	Tropical depression	35 (55)	N/A	Hawaii	$5 million	None	
Ileana	August 10–14	Category 1 hurricane	75 (120)	986	Baja California Peninsula	None	None	
John	August 11 – September 10	Category 5 hurricane	175 (280)	929	Hawaii, Johnston Atoll	$15 million	None	
Twelve-E	August 12–15	Tropical depression	35 (55)	1006	None	None	None	
Kristy	August 28 – September 5	Category 2 hurricane	105 (165)	992	Hawaii	None	None	
Lane	September 3–10	Category 4 hurricane	130 (215)	948	None	None	None	
Mele	September 6–9	Tropical storm	40 (65)	N/A	None	None	None	
Miriam	September 15–21	Tropical storm	45 (75)	1002	None	None	None	
Norman	September 19–22	Tropical storm	40 (65)	1004	None	None	None	
Olivia	September 22–29	Category 4 hurricane	150 (240)	923	None	None	None	
Paul	September 24–30	Tropical storm	45 (75)	1003	None	None	None	
Rosa	October 8–15	Category 2 hurricane	105 (165)	974	Southwestern Mexico, Western Mexico, Southwestern United States, Texas	$700 million	4–30	
Nona	October 21–26	Tropical storm	40 (65)	N/A	None	None	None	
Season aggregates
22 systems	June 18 – October 26		175 (280)	920		$720 million	4-30	

== See also ==
- List of Pacific hurricanes
- Pacific hurricane season
- 1994 Atlantic hurricane season
- 1994 Pacific typhoon season
- 1994 North Indian Ocean cyclone season
- South-West Indian Ocean cyclone season: 1993–94, 1994–95
- Australian region cyclone season: 1993–94, 1994–95
- South Pacific cyclone season: 1993–94, 1994–95
