= Timeline of the 1994 Pacific hurricane season =

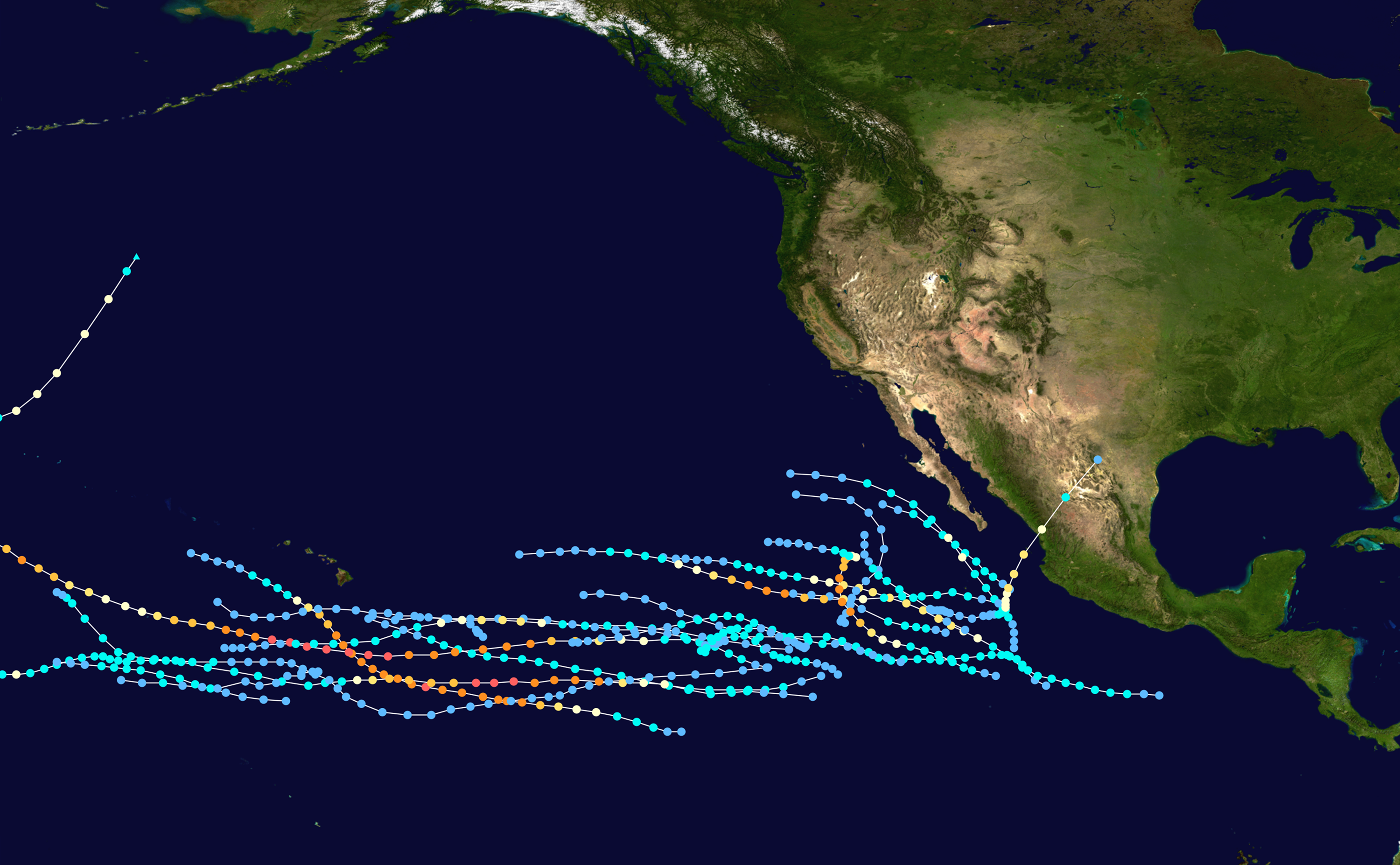
- Season summary map

Season boundaries
- First system formed: June 18, 1994
- Last system dissipated: October 26, 1994

Strongest system
- By maximum sustained winds: John
  - Maximum winds: 175 mph (280 km/h) (1-minute sustained)
  - Lowest pressure: 929 mbar (hPa; 27.43 inHg)
- By central pressure: Gilma
  - Maximum winds: 160 mph (260 km/h) (1-minute sustained)
  - Lowest pressure: 920 mbar (hPa; 27.17 inHg)

Longest lasting system
- Name: John
- Duration: 18.75 (Note: Hurricane John was a tropical cyclone for longer than 18.75 days. It crossed the International Date Line on August 28 and entered the Western Pacific basin, where it spent 11.25 days before crossing back into the Central Pacific basin, giving it a total of 30 days as a tropical cyclone.) days
Storm articles
- Hurricane Emilia (1994)
- Hurricane Gilma (1994)
- Hurricane John (1994)
- Hurricane Rosa (1994)

The 1994 Pacific hurricane season consisted of the events that occurred in the annual cycle of tropical cyclogenesis over the Pacific Ocean north of the Equator and east of the International Date Line. The official bounds of each Pacific hurricane season are dates that conventionally delimit the period each year during which tropical cyclones tend to form in the basin according to the National Hurricane Center, beginning on May 15 in the Eastern Pacific proper (east of 140°W) and on June 1 in the Central Pacific (140°W to the International Date Line), and ending on November 30 in both areas. Activity in the 1994 season was considerably greater than average, particularly in the Central Pacific; tropical cyclones generally formed and intensified farther west than normal due in part to above-average sea surface temperatures over the southeastern portion of the Central Pacific and the prevalence of a large anticyclone near 140°W for much of July and August. El Niño conditions, which tend to cause increased tropical cyclone activity over the Pacific Ocean, were also present. Despite the high activity, the season had an unusually late start; it did not commence until the formation of Tropical Storm Aletta on June 18. The season ended on October 26 with the dissipation of Tropical Storm Nona.

A total of twenty-two tropical depressions formed, with all but two strengthening into named tropical storms; ten became hurricanes, of which five became major hurricanes (Category 3 or higher on the Saffir–Simpson scale). Three hurricanes – Emilia, Gilma, and John – reached Category 5 intensity, the highest rating on the scale. This set a record for most Category 5 hurricanes in one season since records began in 1971, which would later be tied in 2002 and 2018. Hurricane John traversed the Pacific Ocean for 8,190 miles (13,180 km), making it the farthest-traveling tropical cyclone on record worldwide. Lasting for thirty days, (Note: While the National Hurricane Center stated in their preliminary report on Hurricane John that the system was a tropical cyclone for 31 days, the Eastern and Central Pacific hurricane database (HURDAT) lists 121 data points at six-hour intervals for John, including one for the storm's extratropical transition, for a total of 30 days as a tropical cyclone.) John was also the longest-lived tropical cyclone on record globally until Cyclone Freddy, which spent at least thirty-four days as a tropical cyclone in February and March 2023. The storms of the 1994 season collectively generated an Accumulated Cyclone Energy index of 185.2 units, which is the eleventh-highest on record for a Pacific hurricane season as of March 2024. (Note: Broadly speaking, Accumulated Cyclone Energy is the square of a tropical cyclone's wind intensity in knots at six-hour intervals, multiplied by the length of time it existed.)

Only one tropical cyclone, Hurricane Rosa in October, caused fatalities or made landfall during the 1994 season. It struck the Mexican state of Sinaloa at Category 2 strength, killing five people in the country. Proceeding rapidly northeastward across Mexico and into the United States after landfall, the storm and its remnants caused disastrous flooding in southeastern Texas that claimed more than twenty lives and wrought at least $700 million (1994 USD) in damage. Earlier in the season, Tropical Depression One-C and Hurricane John caused minor impacts in the Central Pacific. Heavy rainfall from One-C generated substantial flooding on the Big Island of Hawaii, resulting in damages estimated at up to $5 million (1994 USD). After weakening greatly from its peak intensity, John passed about 15 mi (30 km) to the north of Johnston Atoll as a strong Category 1 hurricane; high winds caused $15 million (1994 USD) in damage.

Prior to 2015, two time zones were utilized in the Eastern Pacific basin: Pacific east of 140°W, and Hawaii−Aleutian from 140°W to the International Date Line. For convenience, each event is listed in Coordinated Universal Time (UTC) first, using the 24-hour clock (where 00:00 = midnight UTC), with the respective local time included in parentheses. Figures for maximum sustained winds and position estimates are rounded to the nearest five units (knots, miles, or kilometers) and averaged over one minute, following National Hurricane Center practice. Direct wind observations are rounded to the nearest whole number. Atmospheric pressures are listed to the nearest millibar and nearest hundredth of an inch of mercury. This timeline documents the formation of tropical cyclones as well as the strengthening, weakening, landfalls, extratropical transitions, and dissipations during the season. It also includes information that was not released while the storm was active, meaning that data from post-storm reviews by the National Hurricane Center and the Central Pacific Hurricane Center is included.

== Timeline of events ==
=== May ===
==== May 15 ====
- The 1994 Eastern Pacific hurricane season officially begins.
- No tropical cyclones formed in May.

=== June ===
==== June 1 ====
- The 1994 Central Pacific hurricane season officially begins.

==== June 18 ====
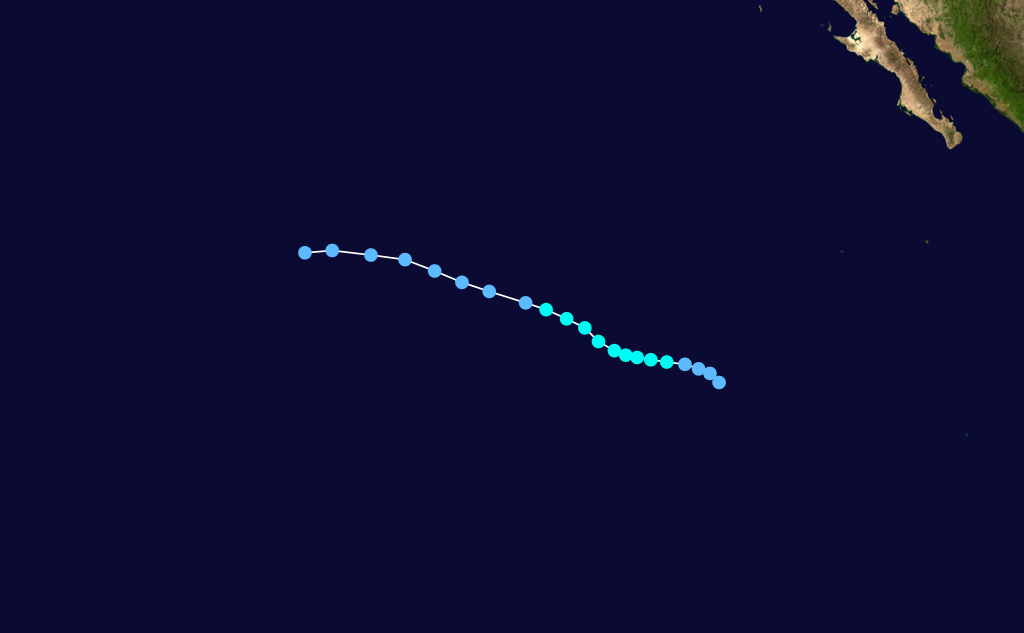
Storm path of Tropical Storm Aletta

- 06:00 UTC (11:00 p.m. PDT, June 17) at 12.6°N 120.1°W – The first tropical depression of the season develops from a tropical wave over the open waters of the Eastern Pacific Ocean.

==== June 19 ====
- 06:00 UTC (11:00 p.m. PDT, June 18) at 13.5°N 122.4°W – The aforementioned tropical depression strengthens into Tropical Storm Aletta.

==== June 20 ====
- 00:00 UTC (5:00 p.m. PDT, June 19) at 13.8°N 124.2°W – Tropical Storm Aletta reaches peak winds of 50 mph (85 km/h).
- 12:00 UTC (5:00 a.m. PDT) at 14.4°N 125.4°W – Tropical Storm Aletta reaches a minimum barometric pressure of 999 mbar (29.50 inHg).

==== June 21 ====
- 12:00 UTC (5:00 a.m. PDT) at 16.1°N 128.6°W – Tropical Storm Aletta weakens into a tropical depression.

==== June 23 ====
- 06:00 UTC (11:00 p.m. PDT, June 22) at 18.3°N 138.3°W – Tropical Depression Aletta dissipates about 1,035 mi (1,670 km) east of the Big Island of Hawaii.

==== June 27 ====
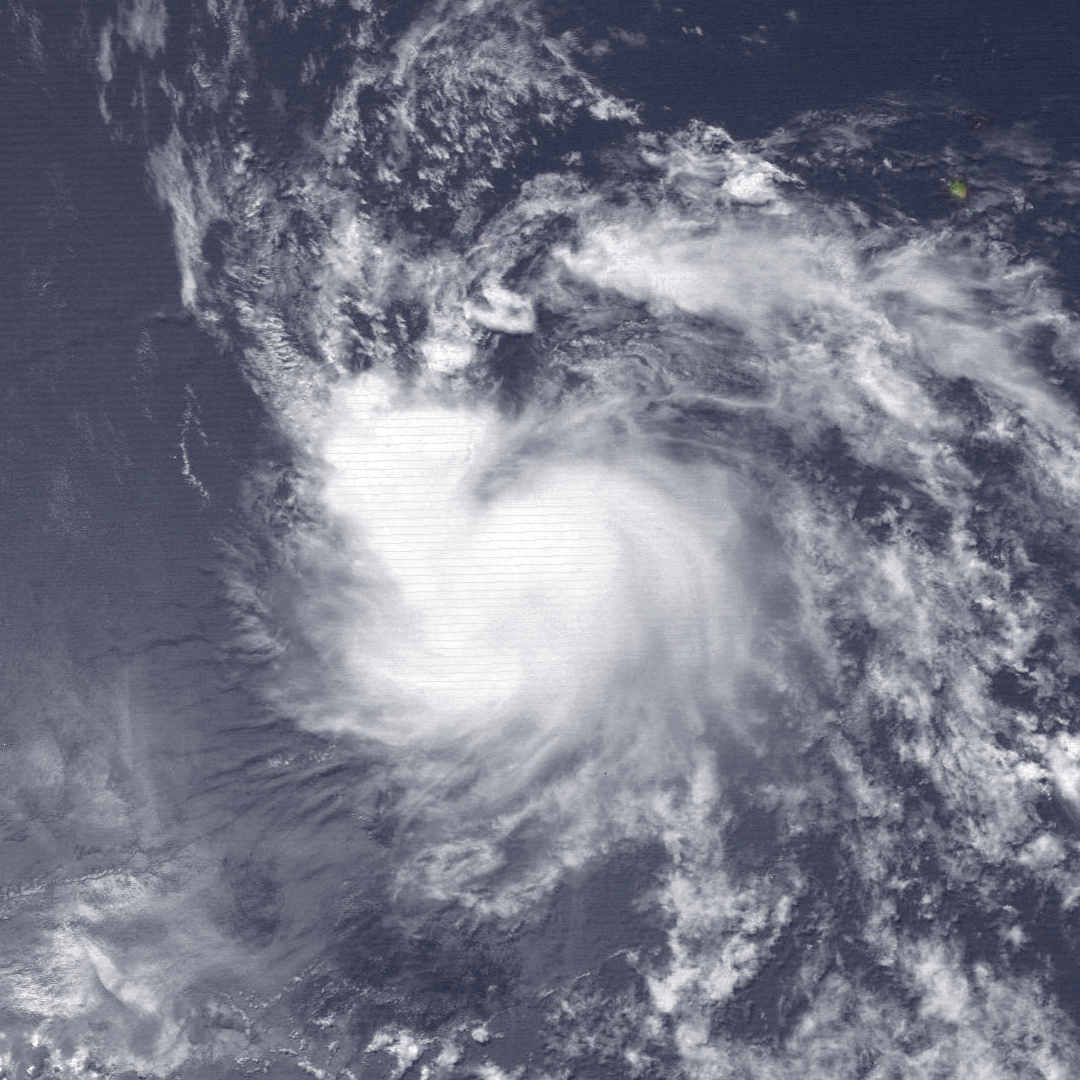
Satellite image of Tropical Storm Bud shortly after being upgraded and receiving a name late on June 27

- 06:00 UTC (11:00 p.m. PDT, June 26) at 15.6°N 112.4°W – A tropical depression develops from a tropical wave about 575 mi (925 km) south-southwest of the southern tip of the Baja California peninsula.
- 18:00 UTC (11:00 a.m. PDT) at 15.9°N 113.8°W – The aforementioned tropical depression strengthens into Tropical Storm Bud about 540 mi (870 km) south-southwest of the southern tip of the Baja California peninsula.

==== June 28 ====
- 00:00 UTC (5:00 p.m. PDT, June 27) at 16.0°N 114.5°W – Tropical Storm Bud reaches peak winds of 45 mph (75 km/h) about 560 mi (900 km) south-southwest of the southern tip of the Baja California peninsula.
- 06:00 UTC (11:00 p.m. PDT, June 27) at 16.1°N 115.3°W – Tropical Storm Bud reaches a minimum barometric pressure of 1,003 mbar (29.62 inHg) about 580 mi (935 km) southwest of the southern tip of the Baja California peninsula.
- 12:00 UTC (5:00 a.m. PDT) at 11.8°N 105.2°W – A tropical depression develops from a tropical wave about 830 mi (1,335 km) south-southeast of the southern tip of the Baja California peninsula.
- 18:00 UTC (11:00 a.m. PDT) at 17.3°N 118.4°W – Tropical Storm Bud weakens into a tropical depression about 670 mi (1,075 km) southwest of the southern tip of the Baja California peninsula.

==== June 29 ====
- 00:00 UTC (5:00 p.m. PDT, June 28) at 13.1°N 106.9°W – The aforementioned tropical depression strengthens into Tropical Storm Carlotta about 700 mi (1,130 km) south-southeast of the southern tip of the Baja California peninsula.
- 18:00 UTC (11:00 a.m. PDT) at 18.4°N 123.3°W – Tropical Depression Bud is last noted about 915 mi (1,475 km) west-southwest of the southern tip of the Baja California peninsula; it dissipates six hours later.
- 18:00 UTC (11:00 a.m. PDT) at 15.2°N 110.1°W – Tropical Storm Carlotta strengthens into a Category 1 hurricane about 550 mi (890 km) south of the southern tip of the Baja California peninsula.

==== June 30 ====
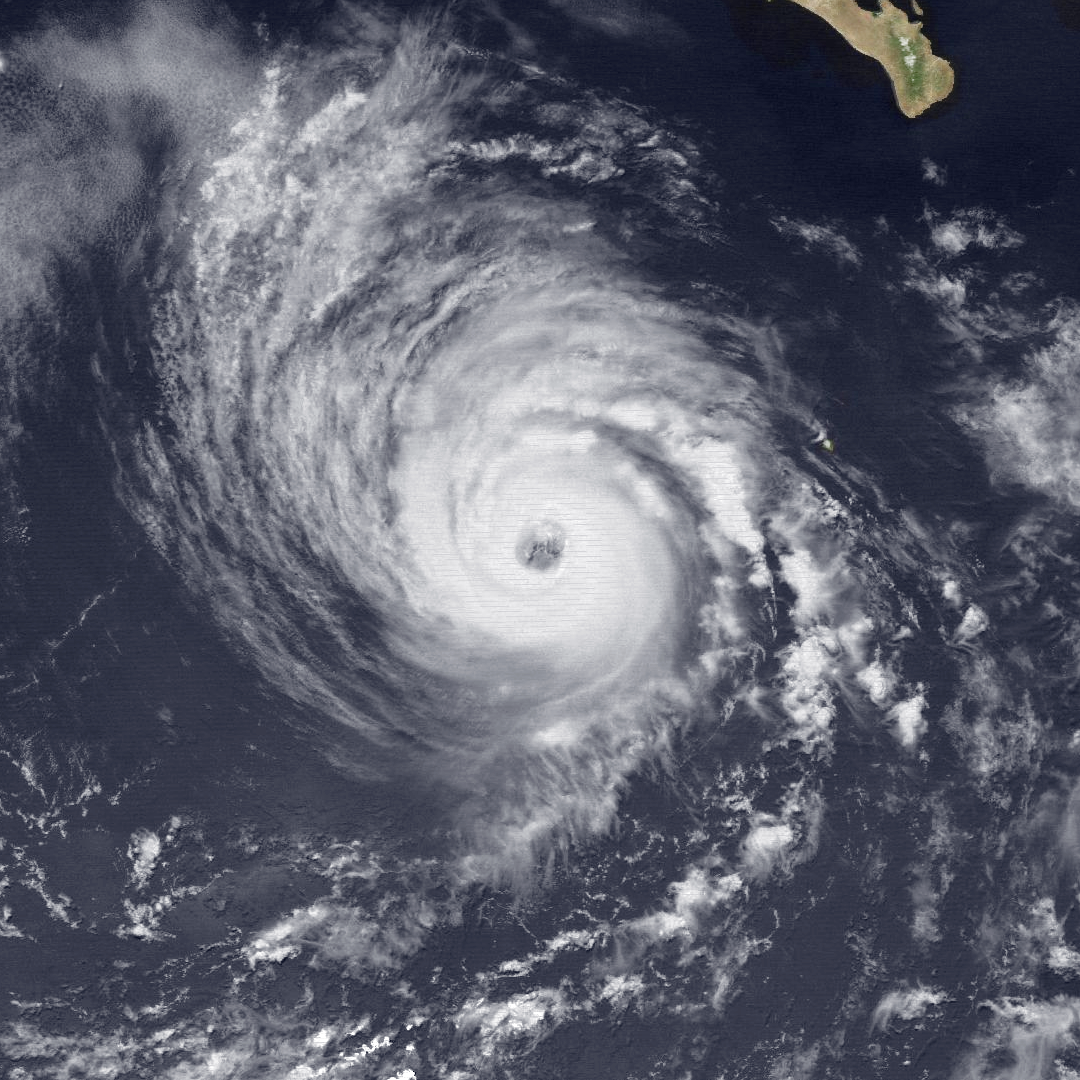
Satellite image of Hurricane Carlotta near peak intensity late on June 30

- 06:00 UTC (11:00 p.m. PDT, June 29) at 16.1°N 112.0°W – Hurricane Carlotta strengthens to Category 2 intensity about 490 mi (790 km) south-southwest of the southern tip of the Baja California peninsula.
- 12:00 UTC (5:00 a.m. PDT) at 16.6°N 112.9°W – Hurricane Carlotta reaches peak winds of 105 mph (165 km/h) about 470 mi (760 km) south-southwest of the southern tip of the Baja California peninsula.

=== July ===
==== July 1 ====
- 00:00 UTC (5:00 p.m. PDT, June 30) at 17.7°N 115.2°W – Hurricane Carlotta reaches a minimum barometric pressure of 967 mbar (28.56 inHg) about 495 mi (795 km) southwest of the southern tip of the Baja California peninsula.

==== July 2 ====
- 06:00 UTC (11:00 p.m. PDT, July 1) at 19.2°N 120.7°W – Hurricane Carlotta weakens to Category 1 intensity about 735 mi (1,185 km) west-southwest of the southern tip of the Baja California peninsula.
- 18:00 UTC (11:00 a.m. PDT) at 19.6°N 123.0°W – Hurricane Carlotta weakens into a tropical storm about 870 mi (1,400 km) west-southwest of the southern tip of the Baja California peninsula.

==== July 4 ====
- 06:00 UTC (11:00 p.m. PDT, July 3) at 20.7°N 128.3°W – Tropical Storm Carlotta weakens into a tropical depression about 1,185 mi (1,910 km) west of the southern tip of the Baja California peninsula.

==== July 5 ====
- 18:00 UTC (11:00 a.m. PDT) at 21.0°N 133.6°W – Tropical Depression Carlotta dissipates about 1,520 mi (2,445 km) west of the southern tip of the Baja California peninsula.

==== July 8 ====
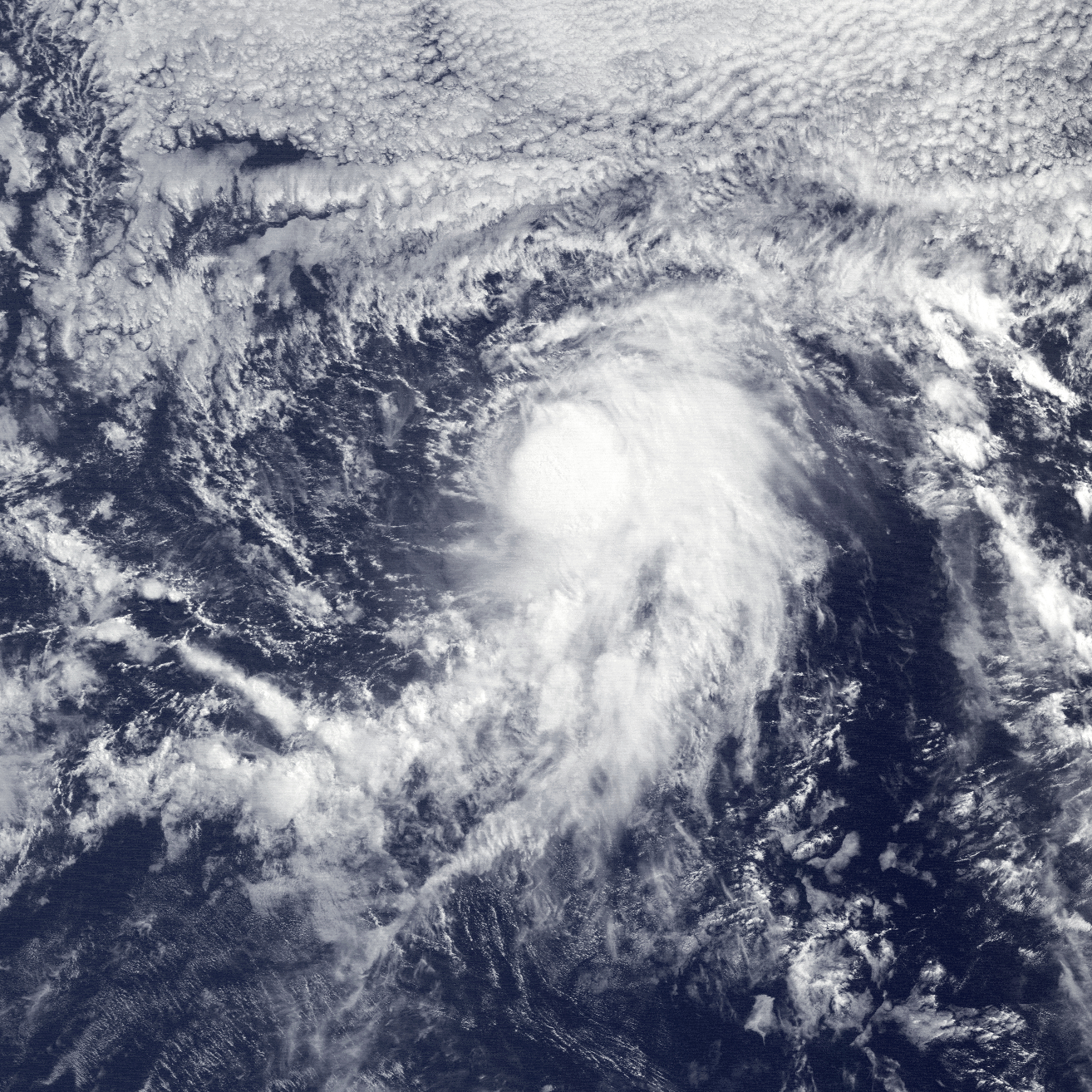
Satellite image of Tropical Storm Daniel near peak intensity late on July 10

- 12:00 UTC (5:00 a.m. PDT) at 12.5°N 121.3°W – Tropical Depression Four-E develops from an area of unsettled weather about 1,035 mi (1,670 km) southwest of the southern tip of the Baja California peninsula.

==== July 9 ====
- 00:00 UTC (5:00 p.m. PDT, July 8) at 11.7°N 124.0°W – Tropical Depression Four-E strengthens into Tropical Storm Daniel about 1,205 mi (1,935 km) southwest of the southern tip of the Baja California peninsula.
- 18:00 UTC (11:00 a.m. PDT) at 11.5°N 127.8°W – Tropical Storm Daniel reaches peak winds of 65 mph (100 km/h) and a minimum barometric pressure of 993 mbar (29.32 inHg) about 1,410 mi (2,270 km) southwest of the southern tip of the Baja California peninsula.

==== July 11 ====
- 18:00 UTC (8:00 a.m. HST) at 13.3°N 140.4°W – Tropical Storm Daniel crosses into the Central Pacific basin about 1,080 mi (1,740 km) east-southeast of Ka Lae, Hawaii.

==== July 14 ====
- 00:00 UTC (2:00 p.m. HST, July 13) at 15.4°N 150.2°W – Tropical Storm Daniel weakens into a tropical depression about 435 mi (705 km) southeast of Ka Lae, Hawaii.
- 18:00 UTC (8:00 a.m. HST) at 16.6°N 153.7°W – Tropical Depression Daniel is last noted as a tropical cyclone about 205 mi (335 km) southeast of Ka Lae, Hawaii; it degenerates into a tropical wave six hours later.

==== July 16 ====
- 00:00 UTC (5:00 p.m. PDT, July 15) at 8.5°N 131.5°W – Tropical Depression Five-E develops from a disturbance near the Intertropical Convergence Zone.

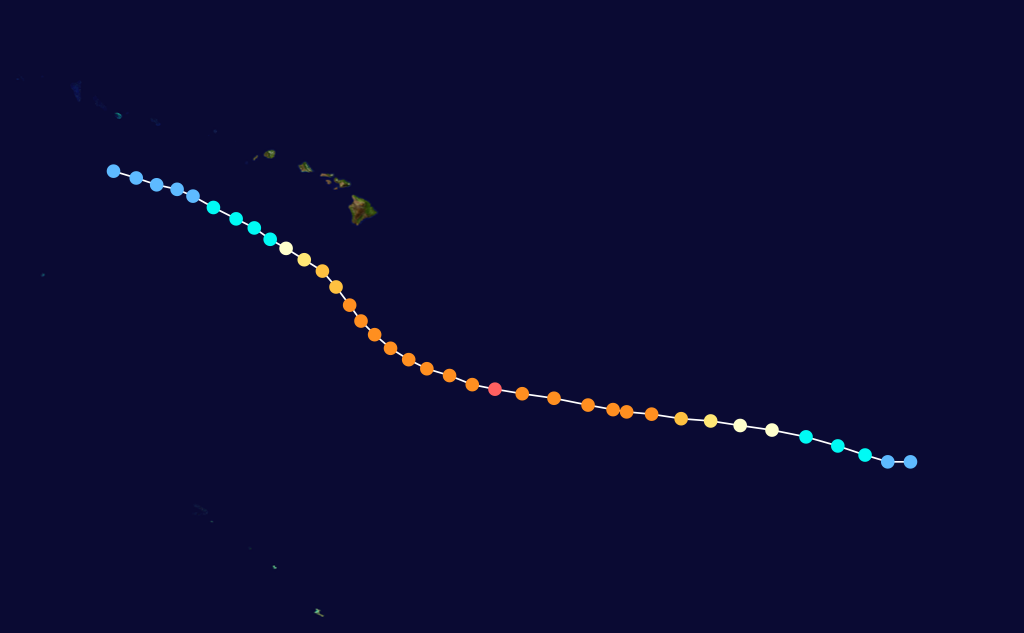
Storm path of Hurricane Emilia

- 12:00 UTC (5:00 a.m. PDT) at 8.8°N 133.3°W – Tropical Depression Five-E strengthens into Tropical Storm Emilia.

==== July 17 ====
- 06:00 UTC (11:00 p.m. PDT, July 16) at 9.9°N 137.4°W – Tropical Storm Emilia strengthens into a Category 1 hurricane.
- 18:00 UTC (8:00 a.m. HST) at 10.3°N 140.1°W – Hurricane Emilia strengthens to Category 2 intensity as it crosses into the Central Pacific basin.

==== July 18 ====
- 00:00 UTC (2:00 p.m. HST, July 17) at 10.4°N 141.4°W – Hurricane Emilia strengthens to Category 3 intensity, making it the first major hurricane of the season.
- 06:00 UTC (8:00 p.m. HST, July 17) at 10.6°N 142.7°W – Hurricane Emilia strengthens to Category 4 intensity.

==== July 19 ====
- 00:00 UTC (5:00 p.m. PDT, July 18) at 13.1°N 125.1°W – Tropical Depression Six-E forms.
- 12:00 UTC (2:00 a.m. HST) at 11.5°N 148.4°W – Hurricane Emilia reaches a minimum barometric pressure of 926 mbar (27.34 inHg).
- 12:00 UTC (5:00 a.m. PDT) at 13.7°N 127.0°W – Tropical Depression Six-E strengthens into Tropical Storm Fabio.

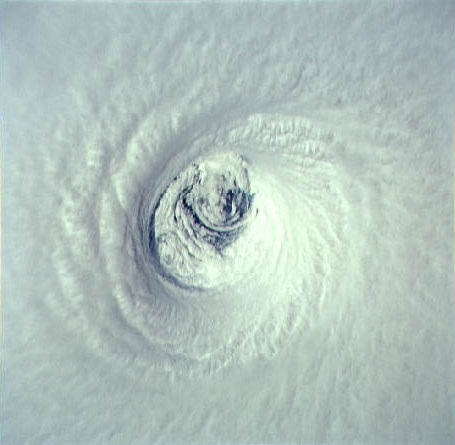
The eye of Hurricane Emilia as seen from satellite on July 19, with mesovortices visible

- 18:00 UTC (8:00 a.m. HST) at 11.7°N 149.6°W – Hurricane Emilia strengthens to Category 5 intensity, making it the first of three such storms this season. It simultaneously reaches peak winds of 160 mph (260 km/h). (Note: In their post-storm reports on Hurricane Emilia, the National Hurricane Center and the Central Pacific Hurricane Center disagreed on the system's maximum wind intensity. The Central Pacific Hurricane Center's report on all 1994 tropical cyclones in their area of responsibility stated that Emilia reached Category 5 intensity at 18:00 UTC on July 19. However, the National Hurricane Center's Premilinary Report on the storm stated that it reached peak winds of 155 mph (250 km/h) – a high-end Category 4 hurricane – at 06:00 UTC on July 19, and maintained these winds for nearly two days. The National Hurricane Center has since amended HURDAT to list Emilia as a Category 5 hurricane for six hours starting at 18:00 UTC on July 19.)
- 18:00 UTC (11:00 a.m. PDT) at 14.1°N 127.9°W – Tropical Storm Fabio reaches peak winds of 45 mph (75 km/h) and a minimum barometric pressure of 1,002 mbar (29.59 inHg).

==== July 20 ====
- 00:00 UTC (2:00 p.m. HST, July 19) at 11.9°N 150.6°W – Hurricane Emilia weakens to Category 4 intensity. (Note: The Central Pacific Hurricane Center stated in their post-season report that Hurricane Emilia regained Category 5 status at 12:00 UTC on July 20 and maintained it for 12 hours. However, HURDAT maintains Emilia as a high-end Category 4 hurricane during this period.)
- 18:00 UTC (11:00 a.m. PDT) at 15.5°N 132.3°W – Tropical Storm Fabio weakens into a tropical depression.

==== July 21 ====
- 06:00 UTC (11:00 p.m. PDT, July 20) at 11.0°N 121.9°W – A tropical depression develops from a tropical wave about 1,135 mi (1,825 km) southwest of the southern tip of the Baja California peninsula.

==== July 22 ====
- 00:00 UTC (2:00 p.m. HST, July 21) at 16.2°N 156.6°W – Hurricane Emilia weakens to Category 3 intensity.
- 00:00 UTC (5:00 p.m. PDT, July 21) at 11.4°N 126.6°W – The aforementioned tropical depression strengthens into Tropical Storm Gilma about 1,350 mi (2,175 km) southwest of the southern tip of the Baja California peninsula.
- 06:00 UTC (8:00 p.m. HST, July 21) at 16.5°N 140.9°W – Tropical Depression Fabio crosses into the Central Pacific basin.
- 12:00 UTC (2:00 a.m. HST) at 17.4°N 158.0°W – Hurricane Emilia weakens to Category 2 intensity.
- 18:00 UTC (8:00 a.m. HST) at 17.9°N 158.8°W – Hurricane Emilia weakens to Category 1 intensity.

==== July 23 ====
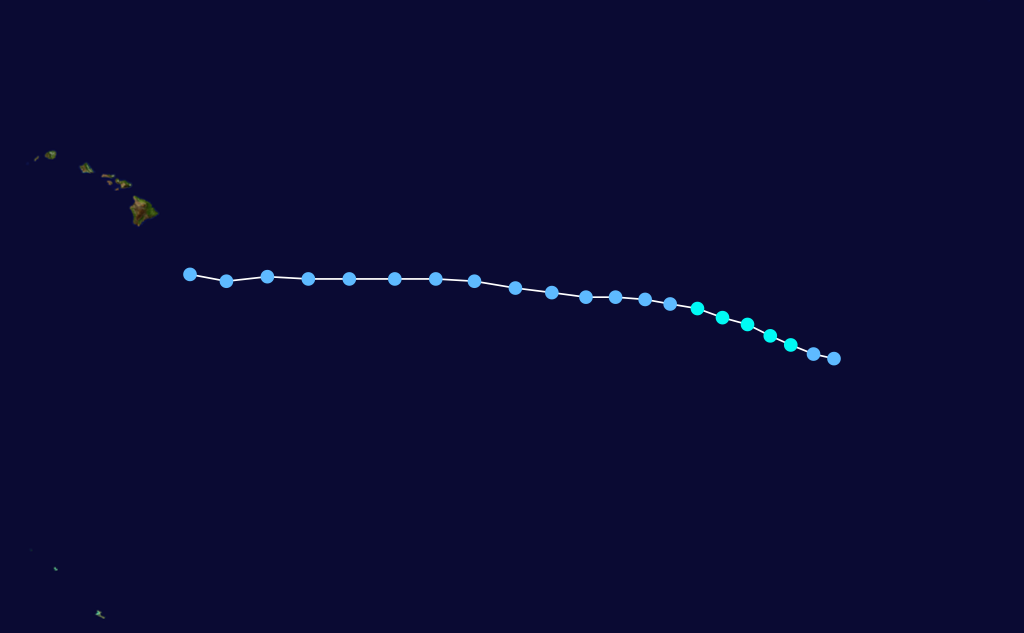
Storm path of Tropical Storm Fabio

- 00:00 UTC (2:00 p.m. HST, July 22) at 18.3°N 159.5°W – Hurricane Emilia weakens into a tropical storm.
- 00:00 UTC (5:00 p.m. PDT, July 22) at 11.9°N 132.5°W – Tropical Storm Gilma strengthens into a Category 1 hurricane about 1,665 mi (2,680 km) west-southwest of the southern tip of the Baja California peninsula.
- 12:00 UTC (5:00 a.m. PDT) at 12.0°N 135.5°W – Hurricane Gilma strengthens to Category 2 intensity about 1,835 mi (2,955 km) west-southwest of the southern tip of the Baja California peninsula.
- 18:00 UTC (11:00 a.m. PDT) at 12.1°N 137.2°W – Hurricane Gilma rapidly strengthens to Category 4 intensity, skipping Category 3 status, about 1,940 mi (3,120 km) west-southwest of the southern tip of the Baja California peninsula; this makes it the second major hurricane of the season.

==== July 24 ====
- 00:00 UTC (2:00 p.m. HST, July 23) at 20.2°N 162.9°W – Tropical Storm Emilia weakens into a tropical depression.
- 00:00 UTC (2:00 p.m. HST, July 23) at 16.8°N 153.4°W – Tropical Depression Fabio is last noted about 205 mi (335 km) southeast of Ka Lae, Hawaii; it dissipates six hours later.
- 06:00 UTC (8:00 p.m. HST, July 23) at 12.2°N 140.4°W – Hurricane Gilma crosses into the Central Pacific basin about 1,115 mi (1,800 km) east-southeast of Ka Lae, Hawaii.
- 18:00 UTC (8:00 a.m. HST) at 12.1°N 143.3°W – Hurricane Gilma strengthens to Category 5 intensity about 950 mi (1,530 km) east-southeast of Ka Lae, Hawaii, making it the second of three such Pacific hurricanes in 1994. It simultaneously reaches peak winds of 160 mph (260 km/h) and a minimum barometric pressure of 920 mbar (27.17 inHg), the lowest for any storm this season.

==== July 25 ====
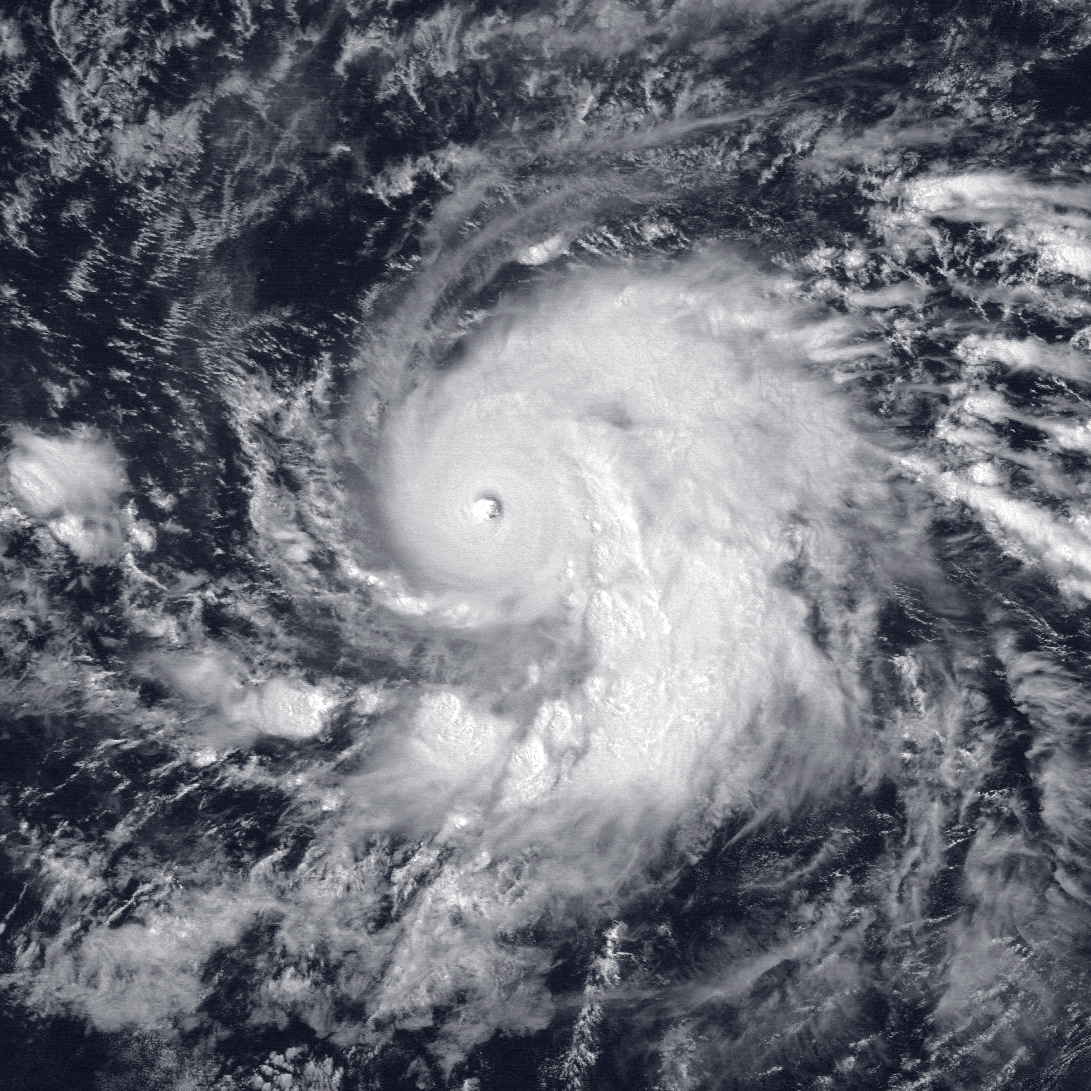
Satellite image of Hurricane Gilma at peak intensity late on July 24

- 06:00 UTC (8:00 p.m. HST, July 24) at 21.3°N 167.6°W – Tropical Depression Emilia dissipates west of Kauai.
- 12:00 UTC (2:00 a.m. HST) at 12.0°N 147.6°W – Hurricane Gilma abruptly weakens to Category 3 intensity, skipping Category 4 status, about 720 mi (1,160 km) southeast of Ka Lae, Hawaii.

==== July 26 ====
- 12:00 UTC (2:00 a.m. HST) at 12.2°N 153.4°W – Hurricane Gilma weakens to Category 2 intensity about 490 mi (790 km) south-southeast of Ka Lae, Hawaii.
- 18:00 UTC (8:00 a.m. HST) at 12.2°N 154.5°W – Hurricane Gilma weakens to Category 1 intensity about 470 mi (760 km) south of Ka Lae, Hawaii.

==== July 27 ====
- 00:00 UTC (2:00 p.m. HST, July 26) at 12.1°N 155.6°W – Hurricane Gilma weakens into a tropical storm about 470 mi (760 km) south of Ka Lae, Hawaii.

==== July 30 ====
- 18:00 UTC (8:00 a.m. HST) at 18.3°N 175.6°W – Tropical Storm Gilma weakens into a tropical depression about 415 mi (665 km) west-northwest of Johnston Atoll.

==== July 31 ====
- 00:00 UTC (2:00 p.m. HST, July 30) at 18.5°N 176.0°W – Tropical Depression Gilma is last noted about 445 mi (715 km) west-northwest of Johnston Atoll; it dissipates six hours later.
- 18:00 UTC (11:00 a.m. PDT) at 13.1°N 125.2°W – Tropical Depression Eight-E forms about 1,210 mi (1,945 km) southwest of the southern tip of the Baja California peninsula.

=== August ===
==== August 2 ====
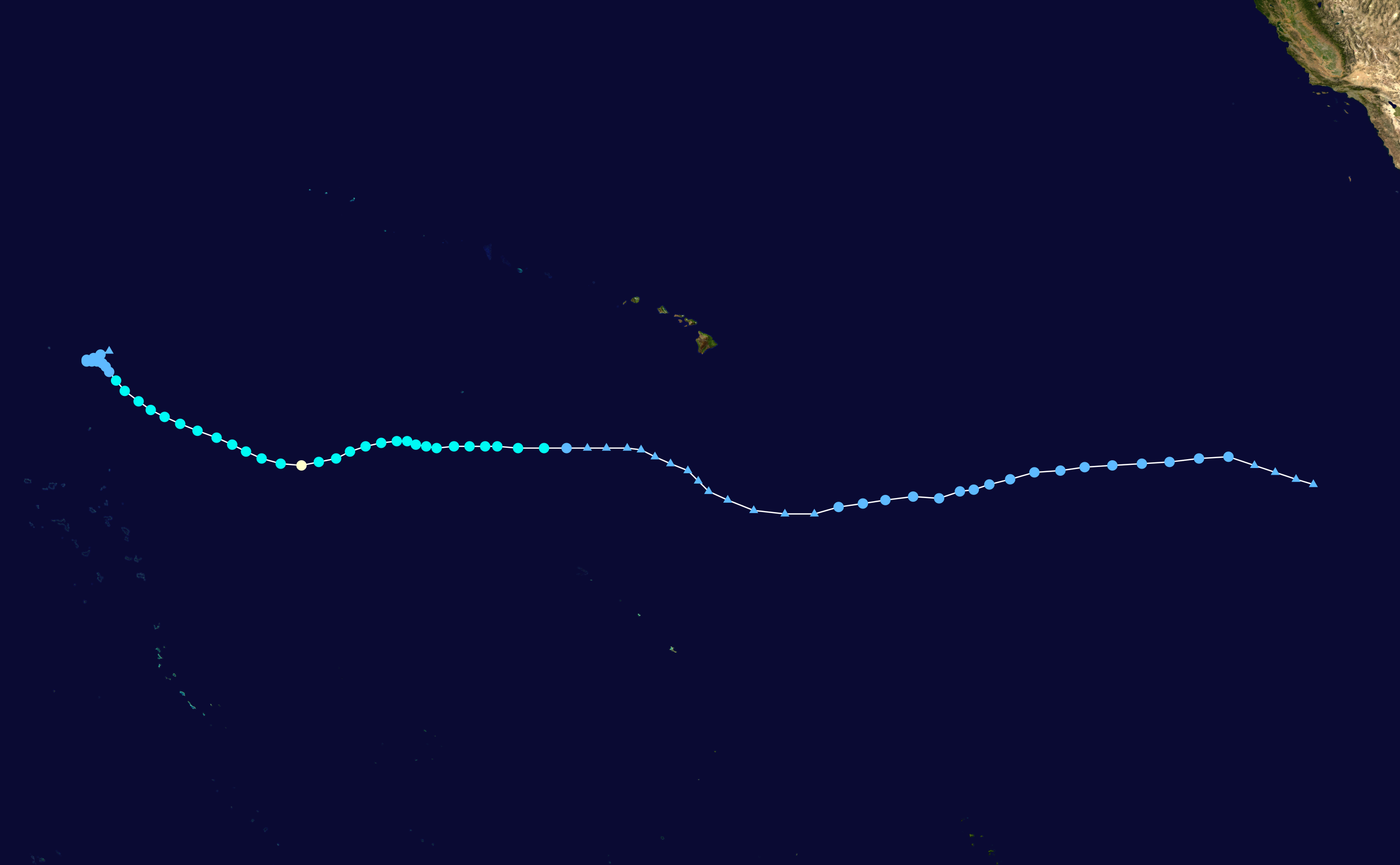
Storm path of Hurricane Li, including the time it spent west of the International Date Line from August 12 to August 18 (Note: The status of Li between August 5 and August 8 is unclear. The Central Pacific Hurricane Center stated in their report on the tropical cyclones which occurred in their area of responsibility in 1994 that Li's organization became poor enough to merit discontinuation of advisories, entertaining the prospect that the system was a remnant low during this time; however, HURDAT maintains Li as a tropical cyclone throughout its existence.)

- 18:00 UTC (11:00 a.m. PDT) at 11.8°N 137.9°W – Tropical Depression Eight-E reaches a barometric pressure of 1,007 mbar (29.74 inHg) about 1,990 mi (3,205 km) west-southwest of the southern tip of the Baja California peninsula; this is the system's lowest known pressure east of the International Date Line because its pressure record is incomplete.

==== August 3 ====
- 06:00 UTC (8:00 p.m. HST, August 2) at 11.1°N 140.0°W – Tropical Depression Eight-E crosses into the Central Pacific basin about 2,140 mi (3,445 km) west-southwest of the southern tip of the Baja California peninsula.

==== August 7 ====
- 00:00 UTC (5:00 p.m. PDT, August 6) at 18.7°N 107.8°W – A tropical depression develops from a tropical wave about 320 mi (520 km) south-southeast of the southern tip of the Baja California peninsula.
- 12:00 UTC (5:00 a.m. PDT) at 19.6°N 109.0°W – The aforementioned tropical depression strengthens into Tropical Storm Hector about 235 mi (380 km) south-southeast of the southern tip of the Baja California peninsula.

==== August 8 ====
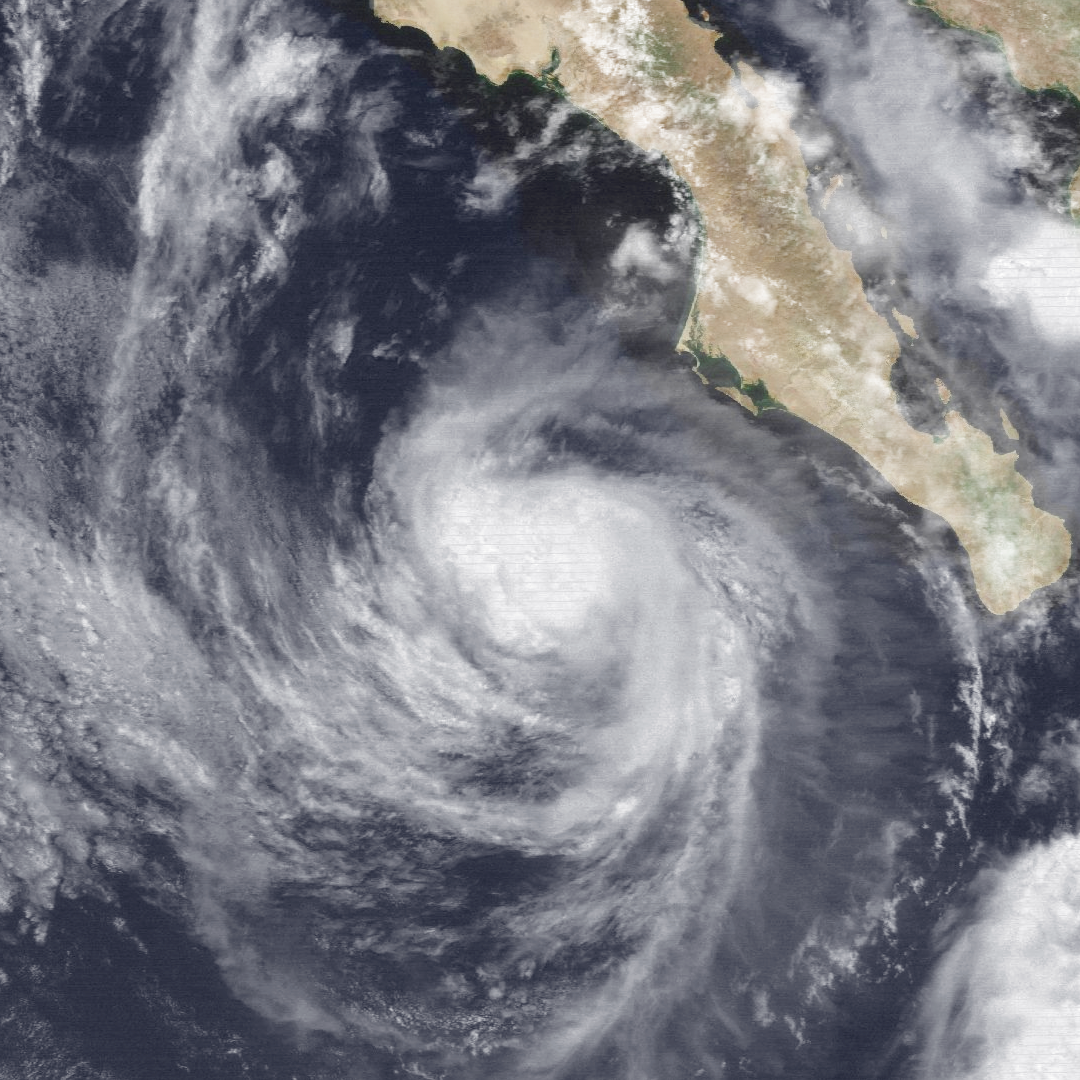
Satellite image of Tropical Storm Hector just after peak intensity late on August 8

- 12:00 UTC (2:00 a.m. HST) at 13.5°N 164.8°W – Tropical Depression Eight-E strengthens into Tropical Storm Li about 385 mi (620 km) southeast of Johnston Atoll.
- 12:00 UTC (5:00 a.m. PDT) at 21.9°N 111.7°W – Tropical Storm Hector reaches peak winds of 65 mph (100 km/h) and a minimum barometric pressure of 993 mbar (29.32 inHg) about 130 mi (215 km) west-southwest of the southern tip of the Baja California peninsula.

==== August 9 ====
- 06:00 UTC (8:00 p.m. HST, August 8) at 15.3°N 145.5°W – Tropical Depression One-C forms from an area of disturbed weather about 720 mi (1,160 km) east-southeast of Ka Lae, Hawaii.
- 12:00 UTC (5:00 a.m. PDT) at 24.4°N 115.8°W – Tropical Storm Hector weakens into a tropical depression about 385 mi (620 km) west-northwest of the southern tip of the Baja California peninsula.
- 12:00 UTC (2:00 a.m. HST) at 15.6°N 145.8°W – Tropical Depression One-C reaches peak winds of 35 mph (55 km/h) about 690 mi (1,110 km) east-southeast of Ka Lae, Hawaii.
- 18:00 UTC (11:00 a.m. PDT) at 24.8°N 116.9°W – Tropical Depression Hector is last noted about 460 mi (740 km) west-northwest of the southern tip of the Baja California peninsula; it dissipates six hours later.

==== August 10 ====
- 12:00 UTC (5:00 a.m. PDT) at 14.5°N 107.5°W – Tropical Depression Eleven-E forms about 690 mi (1,110 km) south-southeast of the southern tip of the Baja California peninsula from an area of unsettled weather that had originated from the Intertropical Convergence Zone two days earlier. (Note: Operationally, advisories were not initiated on Tropical Depression Eleven-E (future Hurricane Ileana) until 15:00 UTC on August 11, by which time it was already a tropical storm; advisories were initiated on Tropical Depression Ten-E (future Hurricane John) six hours prior at 09:00 UTC, resulting in that system receiving an earlier number despite forming 18 hours after Eleven-E.)

==== August 11 ====
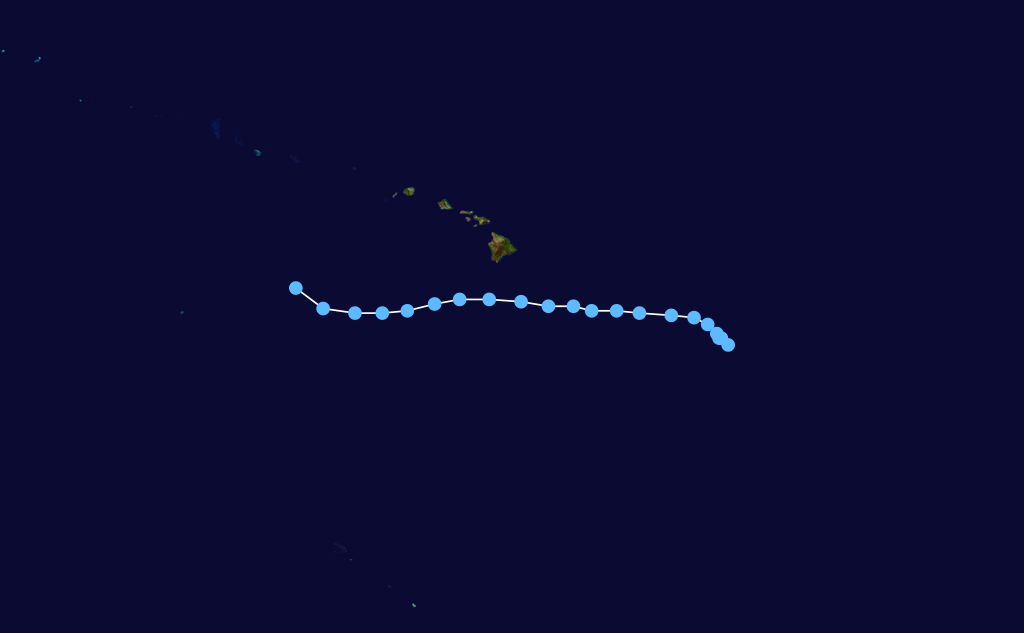
Storm path of Tropical Depression One-C

- 06:00 UTC (11:00 p.m. PDT, August 10) at 11.1°N 97.1°W – Tropical Depression Ten-E forms from a tropical wave about 345 mi (555 km) south-southeast of Acapulco, Guerrero.
- 12:00 UTC (5:00 a.m. PDT) at 16.7°N 107.9°W – Tropical Depression Eleven-E strengthens into Tropical Storm Ileana about 450 mi (725 km) south-southeast of the southern tip of the Baja California peninsula.
- 18:00 UTC (11:00 a.m. PDT) at 11.2°N 99.4°W – Tropical Depression Ten-E strengthens into Tropical Storm John about 390 mi (630 km) south of Acapulco, Guerrero.

==== August 12 ====
- 00:00 UTC (5:00 p.m. PDT, August 11) at 16.3°N 119.6°W – Tropical Depression Twelve-E develops about 770 mi (1,240 km) southwest of the southern tip of the Baja California peninsula from the same Intertropical Convergence Zone disturbance that spawned Tropical Storm Ileana.
- 06:00 UTC (11:00 p.m. PDT, August 11) at 16.4°N 119.9°W – Tropical Depression Twelve-E reaches peak winds of 35 mph (55 km/h) about 790 mi (1,270 km) southwest of the southern tip of the Baja California peninsula.
- 12:00 UTC (2:00 a.m. HST) at 12.6°N 178.9°W – Tropical Storm Li strengthens into a Category 1 hurricane about 690 mi (1,110 km) west-southwest of Johnston Atoll; it simultaneously reaches peak winds of 75 mph (120 km/h).
- 18:00 UTC (8:00 a.m. HST) at 12.6°N 179.9°W – Hurricane Li weakens into a tropical storm about 750 mi (1,205 km) west-southwest of Johnston Atoll. Shortly afterwards, the cyclone crosses the International Date Line and becomes part of the 1994 Pacific typhoon season, where it is designated as Tropical Storm Li.

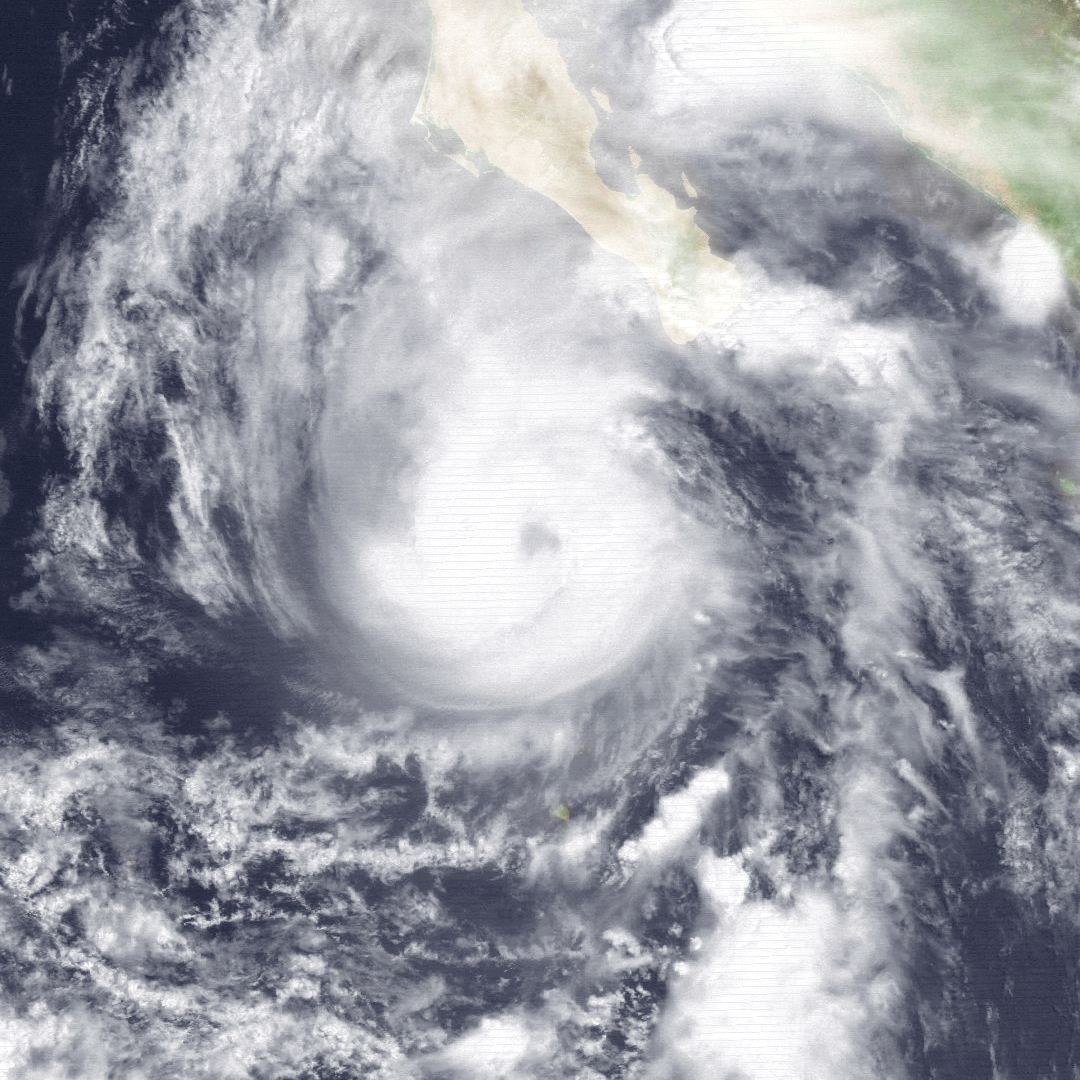
Satellite image of Hurricane Ileana at peak intensity late on August 12

- 18:00 UTC (11:00 a.m. PDT) at 21.0°N 111.2°W – Tropical Storm Ileana strengthens into a Category 1 hurricane about 150 mi (240 km) south-southwest of the southern tip of the Baja California peninsula; it simultaneously reaches peak winds of 75 mph (120 km/h) and a minimum barometric pressure of 986 mbar (29.12 inHg).

==== August 13 ====
- 06:00 UTC (11:00 p.m. PDT, August 12) at 23.7°N 113.4°W – Hurricane Ileana weakens into a tropical storm about 225 mi (360 km) west-northwest of the southern tip of the Baja California peninsula.
- 12:00 UTC (5:00 a.m. PDT) at 12.9°N 106.5°W – Tropical Storm John reaches its initial peak intensity with winds of 70 mph (110 km/h) and a barometric pressure of 990 mbar (29.23 inHg) about 520 mi (835 km) west-southwest of Acapulco, Guerrero.

==== August 14 ====
- 06:00 UTC (8:00 p.m. HST, August 13) at 17.8°N 164.5°W – Tropical Depression One-C is last noted about 580 mi (935 km) west of Ka Lae, Hawaii; it dissipates shortly thereafter.
- 06:00 UTC (11:00 p.m. PDT, August 13) at 26.7°N 119.8°W – Tropical Storm Ileana weakens into a tropical depression about 300 mi (480 km) west-southwest of Punta Eugenia.
- 12:00 UTC (5:00 a.m. PDT) at 23.0°N 117.0°W – Tropical Depression Twelve-E reaches a minimum barometric pressure of 1,006 mbar (29.71 inHg) about 450 mi (725 km) west of the southern tip of the Baja California peninsula.
- 18:00 UTC (11:00 a.m. PDT) at 27.0°N 123.5°W – Tropical Depression Ileana is last noted about 520 mi (835 km) west of Punta Eugenia; it dissipates shortly thereafter.

==== August 15 ====
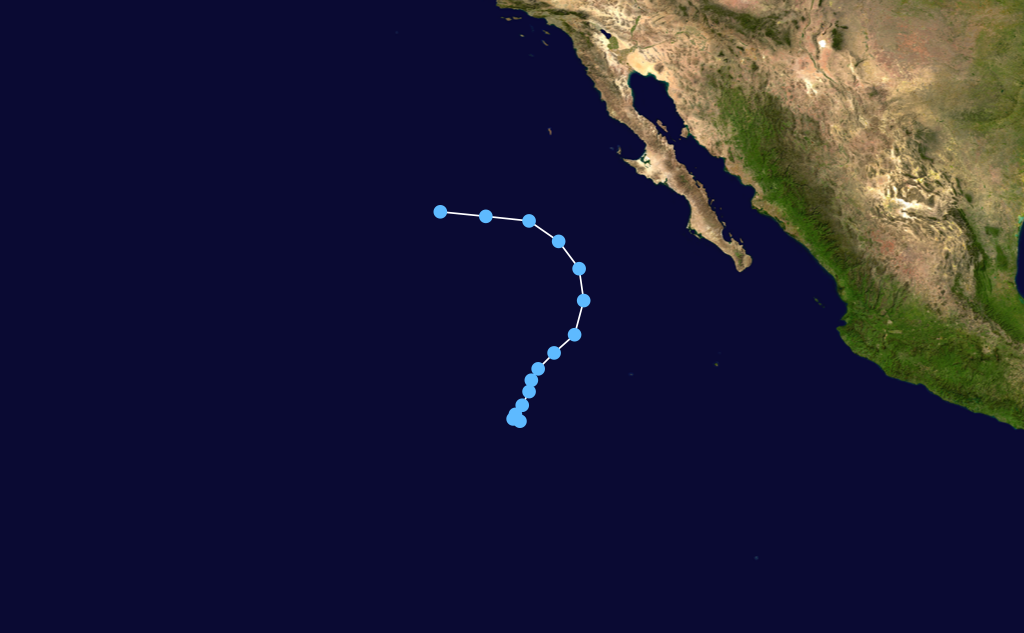
Storm path of Tropical Depression Twelve-E

- 12:00 UTC (5:00 a.m. PDT) at 25.5°N 123.1°W – Tropical Depression Twelve-E is last noted about 845 mi (1,360 km) west-northwest of the southern tip of the Baja California peninsula; it dissipates six hours later.

==== August 20 ====
- 00:00 UTC (5:00 p.m. PDT, August 19) at 15.0°N 134.0°W – After its winds oscillate between 45 mph (75 km/h) and 60 mph (95 km/h) for several days, Tropical Storm John strengthens into a Category 1 hurricane about 2,265 mi (3,650 km) west of Acapulco, Guerrero.
- 12:00 UTC (5:00 a.m. PDT) at 15.0°N 137.2°W – Hurricane John strengthens to Category 2 intensity about 2,480 mi (3,995 km) west of Acapulco, Guerrero.
- 18:00 UTC (11:00 a.m. PDT) at 15.0°N 138.9°W – Hurricane John strengthens to Category 3 intensity about 2,590 mi (4,170 km) west of Acapulco, Guerrero, making it the third major hurricane of the season.

==== August 21 ====
- 00:00 UTC (2:00 p.m. HST, August 20) at 15.0°N 140.6°W – Hurricane John crosses into the Central Pacific basin about 1,030 mi (1,660 km) east-southeast of Ka Lae, Hawaii.
- 06:00 UTC (8:00 p.m. HST, August 20) at 14.8°N 142.1°W – Hurricane John strengthens to Category 4 intensity about 945 mi (1,520 km) east-southeast of Ka Lae, Hawaii.

==== August 22 ====
- 18:00 UTC (8:00 a.m. HST) at 13.9°N 152.3°W – Hurricane John strengthens to Category 5 intensity about 415 mi (665 km) southeast of Ka Lae, Hawaii, making it the third and final such storm in 1994. This is a record for most Category 5 hurricanes in a Pacific hurricane season, which would be tied in 2002 and again in 2018.

==== August 23 ====
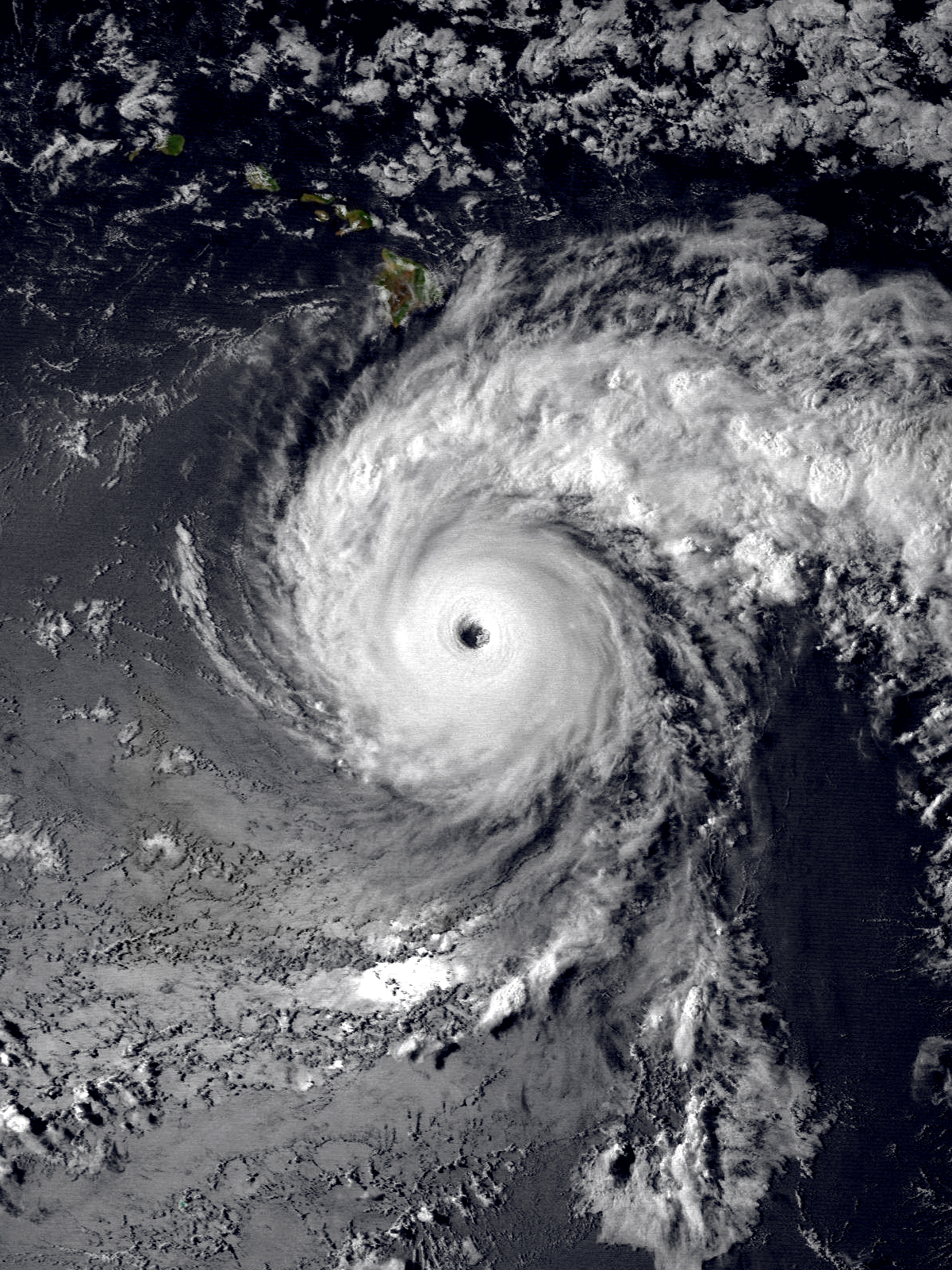
Satellite image of Hurricane John near peak intensity south of Hawaii early on August 23

- 00:00 UTC (2:00 p.m. HST, August 22) at 14.0°N 153.7°W – Hurricane John reaches its lowest known barometric pressure of 929 mbar (27.43 inHg) about 365 mi (585 km) south-southeast of Ka Lae, Hawaii.
- 06:00 UTC (8:00 p.m. HST, August 22) at 14.2°N 155.1°W – Hurricane John reaches peak winds of 175 mph (280 km/h), the highest of any storm this season, about 330 mi (530 km) south of Ka Lae, Hawaii. It also ties with Hurricane Patsy of the 1959 season for the strongest hurricane ever recorded in the Central Pacific by maximum sustained winds.

==== August 24 ====
- 12:00 UTC (2:00 a.m. HST) at 15.3°N 161.8°W – Hurricane John weakens to Category 4 intensity about 470 mi (760 km) west-southwest of Ka Lae, Hawaii.

==== August 25 ====
- 06:00 UTC (8:00 p.m. HST, August 24) at 16.1°N 165.0°W – Hurricane John weakens to Category 3 intensity about 305 mi (490 km) east of Johnston Atoll.

==== August 26 ====
- 00:00 UTC (2:00 p.m. HST, August 25) at 16.8°N 168.8°W – Hurricane John weakens to Category 2 intensity about 45 mi (75 km) east of Johnston Atoll.
- 06:00 UTC (8:00 p.m. HST, August 25) at 17.1°N 169.9°W – Hurricane John weakens to Category 1 intensity about 35 mi (55 km) northwest of Johnston Atoll.

==== August 27 ====
- 00:00 UTC (2:00 p.m. HST, August 26) at 18.5°N 173.7°W – Hurricane John restrengthens to Category 2 intensity about 300 mi (480 km) west-northwest of Johnston Atoll.
- 12:00 UTC (2:00 a.m. HST) at 19.6°N 176.2°W – Hurricane John restrengthens to Category 3 intensity about 485 mi (780 km) west-northwest of Johnston Atoll.

==== August 28 ====
- 00:00 UTC (2:00 p.m. HST, August 27) at 20.8°N 178.5°W – Hurricane John restrengthens to Category 4 intensity about 650 mi (1,045 km) west-northwest of Johnston Atoll; it simultaneously reaches its secondary peak intensity with winds of 130 mph (215 km/h).
- 06:00 UTC (8:00 p.m. HST, August 27) at 21.6°N 179.6°W – Hurricane John weakens back to Category 3 intensity about 735 mi (1,185 km) west-northwest of Johnston Atoll; it crosses the International Date Line shortly thereafter, becoming redesignated as Typhoon John of the 1994 Pacific typhoon season.
- 18:00 UTC (11:00 a.m. PDT) at 14.4°N 123.6°W – Tropical Depression Thirteen-E develops from a tropical wave about 1,065 mi (1,715 km) southwest of the southern tip of the Baja California peninsula.

==== August 30 ====
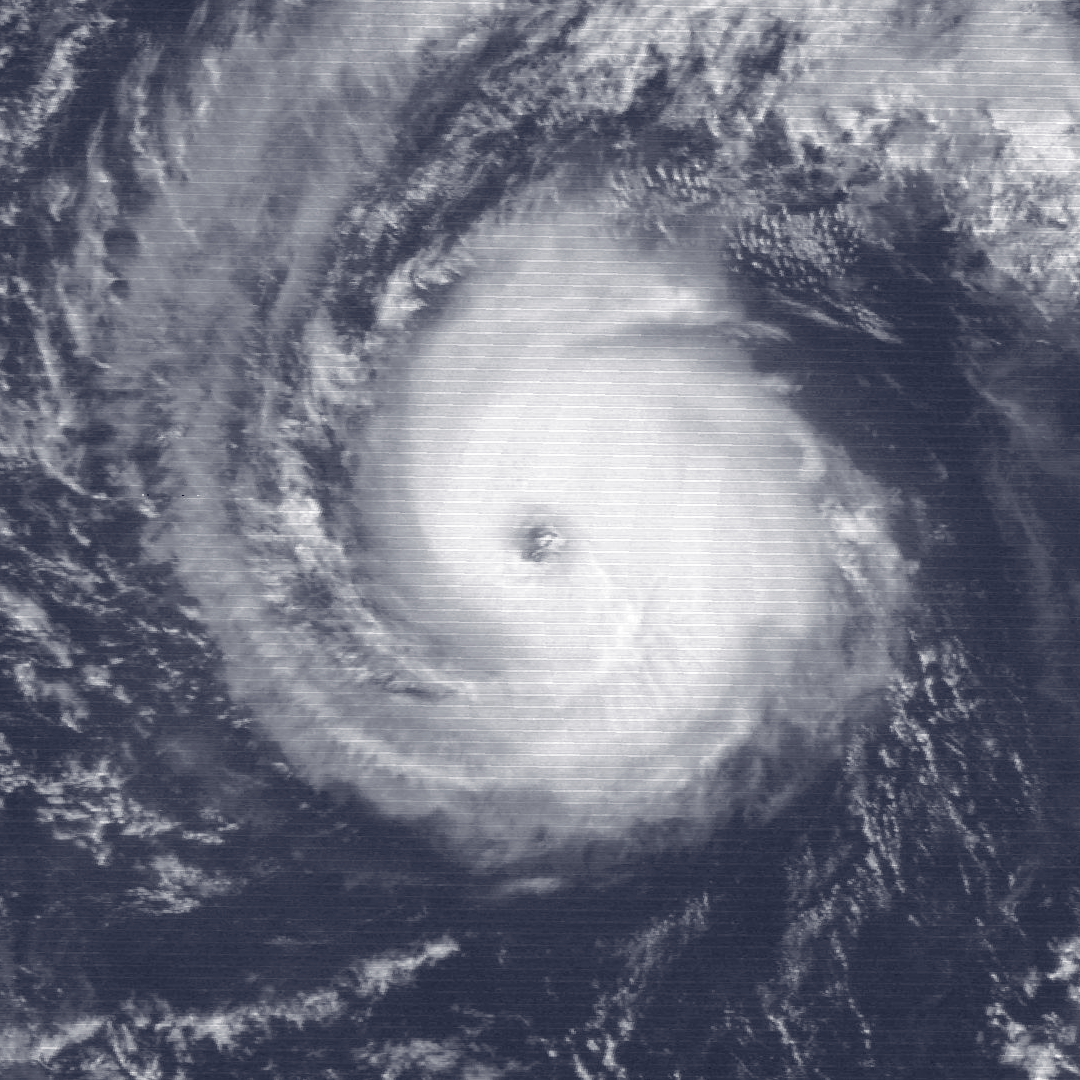
Satellite image of Hurricane Kristy near peak intensity late on August 31

- 06:00 UTC (11:00 p.m. PDT, August 29) at 15.9°N 133.4°W – Tropical Depression Thirteen-E strengthens into Tropical Storm Kristy about 1,600 mi (2,575 km) west-southwest of the southern tip of the Baja California peninsula.

==== August 31 ====
- 06:00 UTC (11:00 p.m. PDT, August 30) at 16.2°N 139.8°W – Tropical Storm Kristy reaches a barometric pressure of 992 mbar (29.29 inHg) shortly before crossing into the Central Pacific basin; this is Kristy's lowest known pressure due to a lack of pressure data from the storm's time in the Central Pacific Hurricane Center's area of responsibility.
- 12:00 UTC (2:00 a.m. HST) at 16.3°N 141.3°W – Tropical Storm Kristy strengthens into a Category 1 hurricane about 960 mi (1,545 km) east of Ka Lae, Hawaii.
- 18:00 UTC (8:00 a.m. HST) at 16.4°N 142.8°W – Hurricane Kristy strengthens to Category 2 intensity about 865 mi (1,390 km) east-southeast of Ka Lae, Hawaii.

=== September ===
==== September 1 ====
- 00:00 UTC (2:00 p.m. HST, August 31) at 16.5°N 144.1°W – Hurricane Kristy reaches peak winds of 105 mph (165 km/h) about 775 mi (1,250 km) east-southeast of Ka Lae, Hawaii.
- 12:00 UTC (2:00 a.m. HST) at 16.5°N 147.0°W – Hurricane Kristy weakens to Category 1 intensity about 595 mi (955 km) east-southeast of Ka Lae, Hawaii.

==== September 2 ====
- 00:00 UTC (2:00 p.m. HST, September 1) at 16.0°N 150.2°W – Hurricane Kristy weakens into a tropical storm about 415 mi (665 km) east-southeast of Ka Lae, Hawaii.

==== September 3 ====
- 18:00 UTC (8:00 a.m. HST) at 14.8°N 160.0°W – Tropical Storm Kristy weakens into a tropical depression about 405 mi (650 km) southwest of Ka Lae, Hawaii.
- 18:00 UTC (11:00 a.m. PDT) at 17.7°N 108.6°W – Tropical Depression Fourteen-E forms from a tropical wave about 370 mi (595 km) south-southeast of the southern tip of the Baja California peninsula.

==== September 4 ====
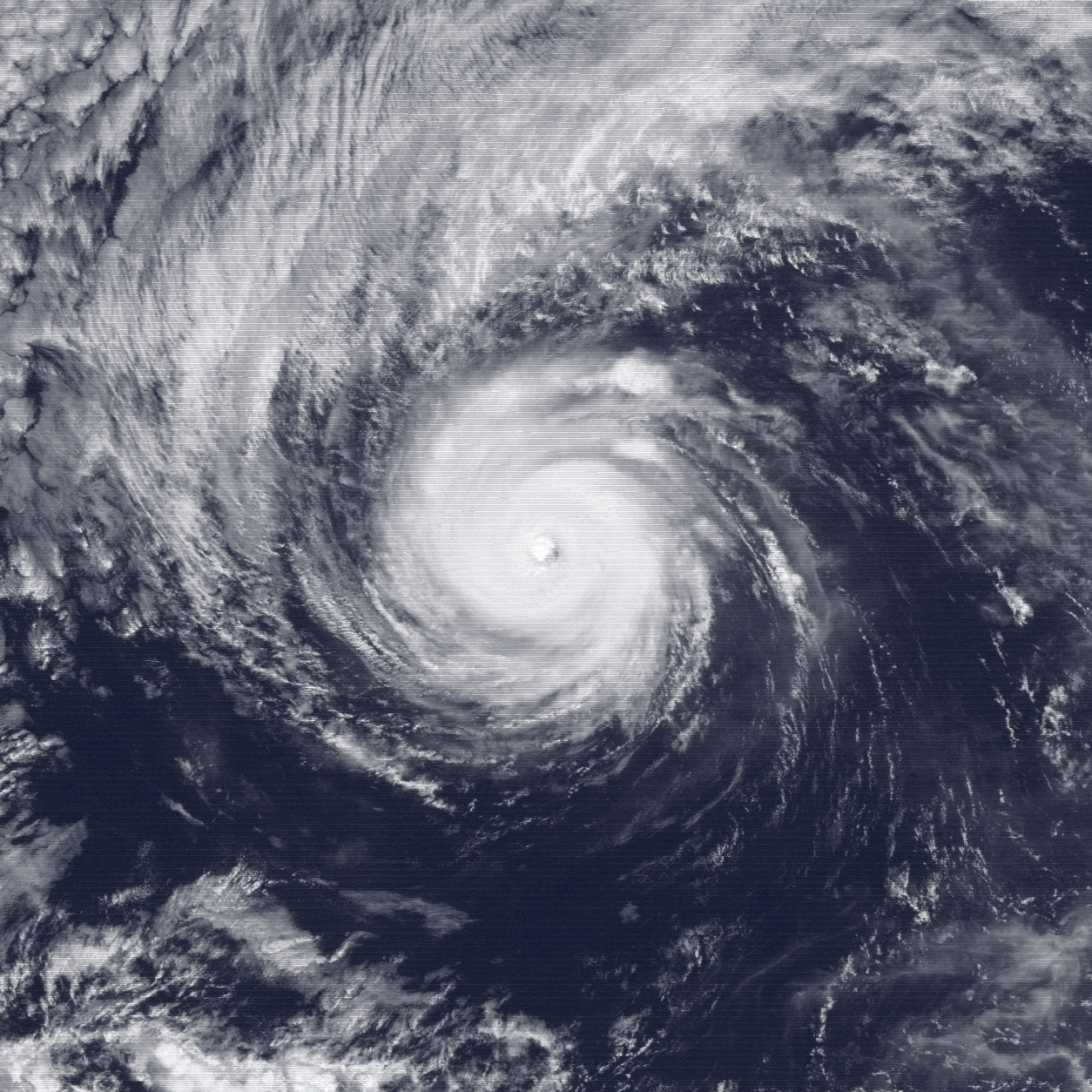
Satellite image of Hurricane Lane near peak intensity late on September 6

- 06:00 UTC (11:00 p.m. PDT, September 3) at 18.2°N 110.8°W – Tropical Depression Fourteen-E strengthens into Tropical Storm Lane about 330 mi (530 km) south of the southern tip of the Baja California peninsula.

==== September 5 ====
- 00:00 UTC (2:00 p.m. HST, September 4) at 14.5°N 164.0°W – Tropical Depression Kristy is last noted about 625 mi (1,010 km) west-southwest of Ka Lae, Hawaii; it dissipates six hours later.
- 18:00 UTC (11:00 a.m. PDT) at 18.0°N 118.3°W – Tropical Storm Lane strengthens into a Category 1 hurricane about 635 mi (1,020 km) southwest of the southern tip of the Baja California peninsula.

==== September 6 ====
- 00:00 UTC (5:00 p.m. PDT, September 5) at 18.0°N 119.7°W – Hurricane Lane strengthens to Category 2 intensity about 715 mi (1,150 km) west-southwest of the southern tip of the Baja California peninsula.
- 00:00 UTC (2:00 p.m. HST, September 5) at 10.7°N 159.6°W – Tropical Depression Two-C forms about 740 mi (1,195 km) south of Honolulu, Hawaii.
- 06:00 UTC (11:00 p.m. PDT, September 5) at 18.0°N 121.1°W – Hurricane Lane strengthens to Category 3 intensity about 795 mi (1,280 km) west-southwest of the southern tip of the Baja California peninsula, making it the fourth major hurricane of the season.
- 18:00 UTC (11:00 a.m. PDT) at 18.4°N 123.9°W – Hurricane Lane strengthens to Category 4 intensity about 950 mi (1,530 km) west-southwest of the southern tip of the Baja California peninsula; it simultaneously reaches peak winds of 130 mph (215 km/h).

==== September 7 ====
- 00:00 UTC (5:00 p.m. PDT, September 6) at 18.6°N 125.2°W – Hurricane Lane reaches a minimum barometric pressure of 948 mbar (27.99 inHg) about 1,025 mi (1,650 km) west-southwest of the southern tip of the Baja California peninsula.

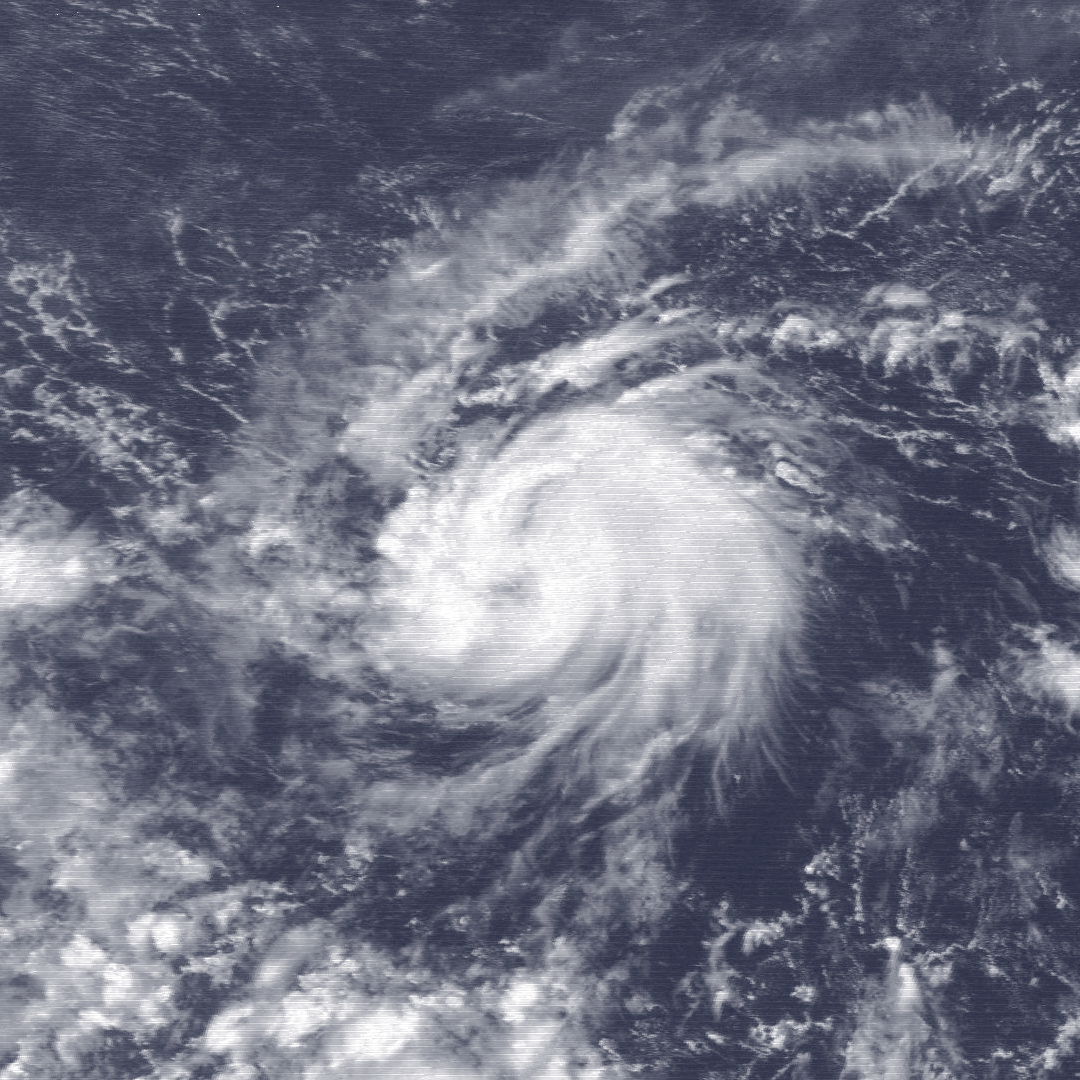
Satellite image of Tropical Depression Two-C late on September 6, shortly before the system became a tropical storm and received the name Mele

- 00:00 UTC (2:00 p.m. HST, September 6) at 11.6°N 165.0°W – Tropical Depression Two-C strengthens into Tropical Storm Mele about 815 mi (1,315 km) southwest of Honolulu, Hawaii; it simultaneously reaches peak winds of 40 mph (65 km/h).
- 12:00 UTC (5:00 a.m. PDT) at 19.4°N 127.7°W – Hurricane Lane weakens to Category 3 intensity about 1,170 mi (1,880 km) west-southwest of the southern tip of the Baja California peninsula.
- 18:00 UTC (11:00 a.m. PDT) at 19.7°N 129.0°W – Hurricane Lane weakens to Category 2 intensity about 1,245 mi (2,000 km) west of the southern tip of the Baja California peninsula.

==== September 8 ====
- 00:00 UTC (5:00 p.m. PDT, September 7) at 20.1°N 130.2°W – Hurricane Lane weakens to Category 1 intensity about 1,310 mi (2,115 km) west of the southern tip of the Baja California peninsula.
- 12:00 UTC (5:00 a.m. PDT) at 20.9°N 132.7°W – Hurricane Lane weakens into a tropical storm about 1,460 mi (2,355 km) west of the southern tip of the Baja California peninsula.
- 18:00 UTC (8:00 a.m. HST) at 31.5°N 178.9°W – After weakening into a tropical depression in the Western Pacific basin, but having since restrengthened, Tropical Storm John regains Category 1 intensity as it crosses back into the Central Pacific basin about 245 mi (400 km) north-northwest of Midway Atoll.

==== September 9 ====
- 00:00 UTC (2:00 p.m. HST, September 8) at 32.7°N 177.4°W – Hurricane John reaches its tertiary peak intensity with winds of 90 mph (150 km/h) about 310 mi (500 km) north of Midway Atoll.
- 00:00 UTC (2:00 p.m. HST, September 8) at 13.3°N 174.0°W – Tropical Storm Mele weakens into a tropical depression about 1,195 mi (1,925 km) west-southwest of Honolulu, Hawaii.
- 12:00 UTC (5:00 a.m. PDT) at 21.4°N 137.7°W – Tropical Storm Lane weakens into a tropical depression about 1,775 mi (2,855 km) west of the southern tip of the Baja California peninsula.
- 18:00 UTC (8:00 a.m. HST) at 13.5°N 176.0°W – Tropical Depression Mele is last noted about 1,310 mi (2,115 km) west-southwest of Hololulu, Hawaii; it dissipates shortly thereafter.

==== September 10 ====
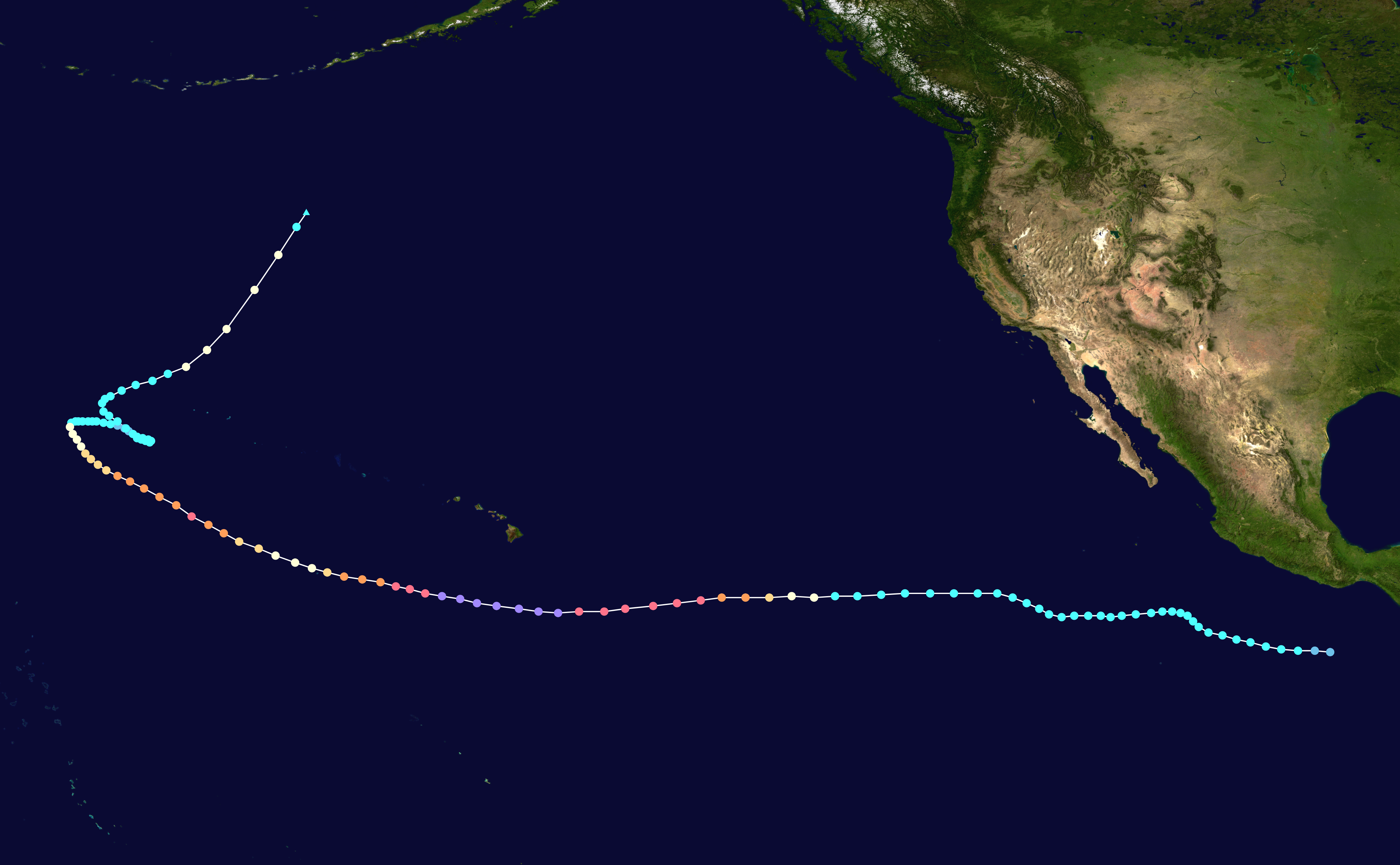
Storm path of Hurricane John, including the time it spent west of the International Date Line from August 28 to September 8

- 00:00 UTC (2:00 p.m. HST, September 9) at 41.5°N 171.0°W – Hurricane John weakens into a tropical storm about 985 mi (1,585 km) north-northeast of Midway Atoll.
- 00:00 UTC (2:00 p.m. HST, September 9) at 21.4°N 140.0°W – Tropical Depression Lane crosses into the Central Pacific basin about 1,920 mi (3,095 km) west of the southern tip of the Baja California peninsula.
- 06:00 UTC (8:00 p.m. HST, September 9) at 42.5°N 170.3°W – Tropical Storm John transitions into an extratropical cyclone about 1,065 mi (1,715 km) north-northeast of Midway Atoll.
- 12:00 UTC (2:00 a.m. HST) at 21.2°N 142.9°W – Tropical Depression Lane is last noted about 2,105 mi (3,390 km) west of the southern tip of the Baja California peninsula; it dissipates six hours later.

==== September 15 ====
- 18:00 UTC (11:00 a.m. PDT) at 13.5°N 115.6°W – Tropical Depression Fifteen-E forms from an area of unsettled weather about 750 mi (1,205 km) south-southwest of the southern tip of the Baja California peninsula.

==== September 17 ====
- 06:00 UTC (11:00 p.m. PDT, September 16) at 14.8°N 121.2°W – Tropical Depression Fifteen-E strengthens into Tropical Storm Miriam about 920 mi (1,480 km) southwest of the southern tip of the Baja California peninsula.

==== September 18 ====
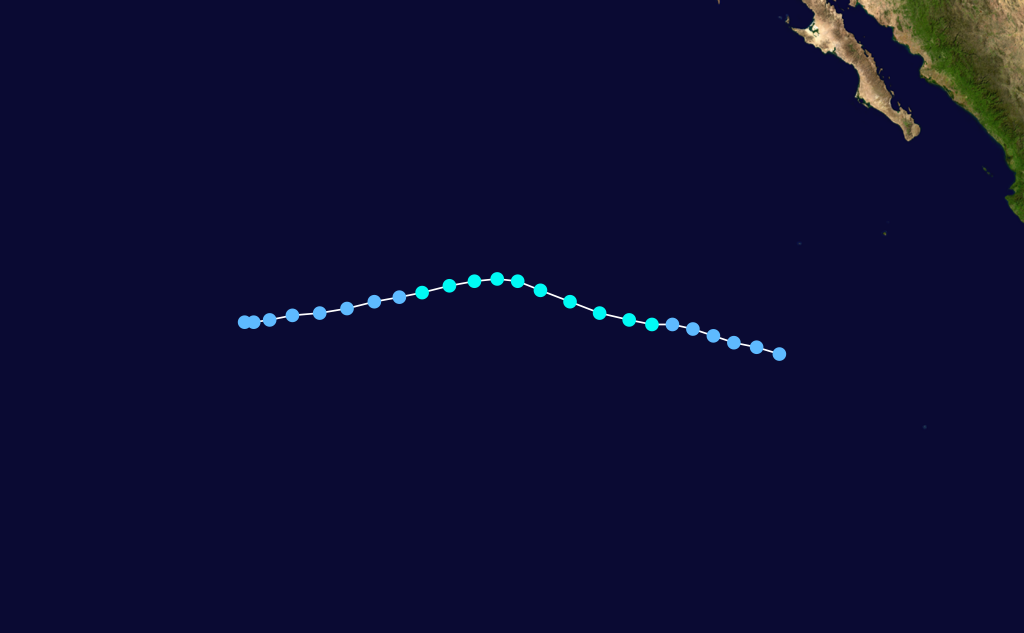
Storm path of Tropical Storm Miriam

- 00:00 UTC (5:00 p.m. PDT, September 17) at 15.8°N 124.8°W – Tropical Storm Miriam reaches a minimum barometric pressure of 1,002 mbar (29.59 inHg) about 1,080 mi (1,740 km) west-southwest of the southern tip of the Baja California peninsula.
- 06:00 UTC (11:00 p.m. PDT, September 17) at 16.3°N 126.1°W – Tropical Storm Miriam reaches peak winds of 45 mph (75 km/h) about 1,145 mi (1,845 km) west-southwest of the southern tip of the Baja California peninsula.

==== September 19 ====
- 06:00 UTC (11:00 a.m. PDT, September 18) at 15.8°N 111.0°W – Tropical Depression Sixteen-E forms about 495 mi (795 km) south of the southern tip of the Baja California peninsula.
- 18:00 UTC (11:00 a.m. PDT) at 16.0°N 132.3°W – Tropical Storm Miriam weakens into a tropical depression about 1,530 mi (2,465 km) west-southwest of the southern tip of the Baja California peninsula.

==== September 20 ====
- 00:00 UTC (5:00 p.m. PDT, September 19) at 18.1°N 114.7°W – Tropical Depression Sixteen-E strengthens into Tropical Storm Norman about 450 mi (725 km) southwest of the southern tip of the Baja California peninsula; it simultaneously reaches peak winds of 40 mph (65 km/h).
- 12:00 UTC (5:00 a.m. PDT) at 19.3°N 116.6°W – Tropical Storm Norman reaches a minimum barometric pressure of 1,004 mbar (29.65 inHg) about 495 mi (795 km) west-southwest of the southern tip of the Baja California peninsula.

==== September 21 ====
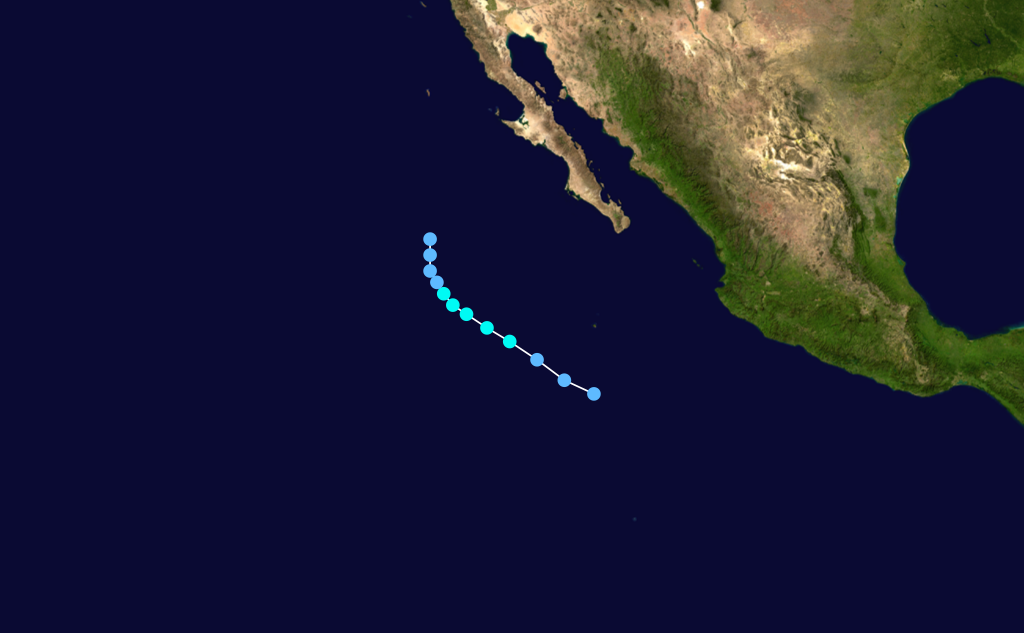
Storm path of Tropical Storm Norman

- 06:00 UTC (11:00 p.m. PDT, September 20) at 20.7°N 117.9°W – Tropical Storm Norman weakens into a tropical depression about 530 mi (850 km) west-southwest of the southern tip of the Baja California peninsula.
- 12:00 UTC (5:00 a.m. PDT) at 14.9°N 139.1°W – Tropical Depression Miriam is last noted about 1,980 mi (3,185 km) west-southwest of the southern tip of the Baja California peninsula; it dissipates six hours later.

==== September 22 ====
- 00:00 UTC (5:00 p.m. PDT, September 21) at 22.6°N 118.2°W – Tropical Depression Norman is last noted about 525 mi (845 km) west of the southern tip of the Baja California peninsula; it dissipates shortly thereafter.
- 06:00 UTC (11:00 p.m. PDT, September 21) at 12.5°N 108.8°W – A tropical depression forms from an area of disturbed weather about 720 mi (1,160 km) south of the southern tip of the Baja California peninsula.
- 18:00 UTC (11:00 a.m. PDT) at 12.9°N 110.5°W – The aforementioned tropical depression strengthens into Tropical Storm Olivia about 690 mi (1,110 km) south of the southern tip of the Baja California peninsula.

==== September 24 ====
- 06:00 UTC (11:00 p.m. PDT, September 23) at 14.8°N 115.9°W – Tropical Storm Olivia strengthens into a Category 1 hurricane about 680 mi (1,095 km) southwest of the southern tip of the Baja California peninsula.
- 12:00 UTC (5:00 a.m. PDT) at 15.2°N 128.3°W – Tropical Depression Eighteen-E forms from an Intertropical Convergence Zone disturbance about 1,305 mi (2,105 km) west-southwest of the southern tip of the Baja California peninsula.
- 18:00 UTC (11:00 a.m. PDT) at 15.6°N 117.7°W – Hurricane Olivia strengthens to Category 2 intensity about 715 mi (1,150 km) southwest of the southern tip of the Baja California peninsula.

==== September 25 ====
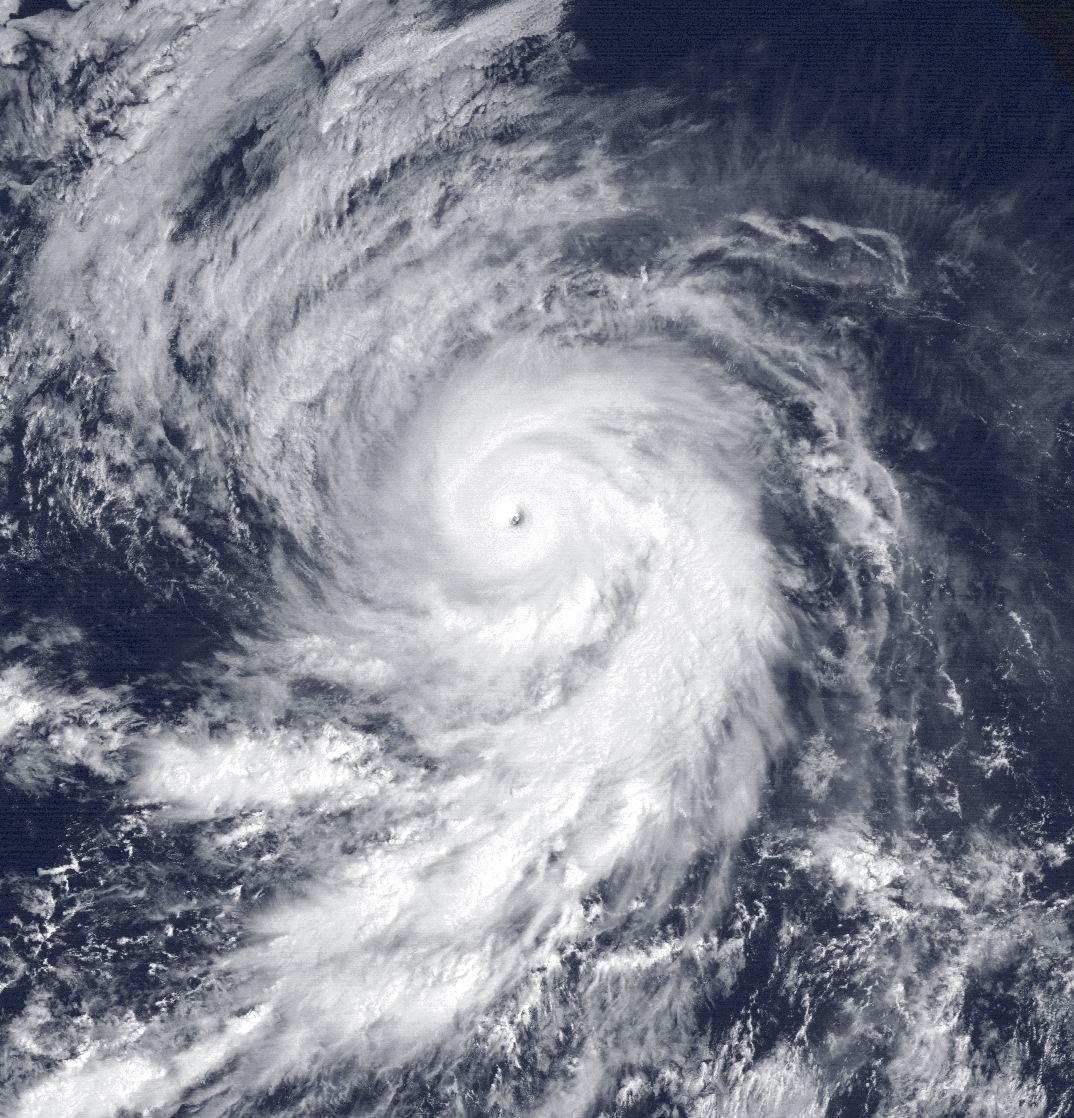
Satellite image of Hurricane Olivia near peak intensity on September 25

- 00:00 UTC (5:00 p.m. PDT, September 24) at 16.3°N 118.5°W – Hurricane Olivia strengthens to Category 3 intensity about 720 mi (1,160 km) southwest of the southern tip of the Baja California peninsula, making it the fifth and final major hurricane of the season.
- 06:00 UTC (11:00 p.m. PDT, September 24) at 17.1°N 119.2°W – Hurricane Olivia strengthens to Category 4 intensity about 720 mi (1,160 km) southwest of the southern tip of the Baja California peninsula.
- 12:00 UTC (5:00 a.m. PDT) at 17.8°N 119.8°W – Hurricane Olivia reaches peak winds of 150 mph (240 km/h) and a minimum barometric pressure of 923 mbar (27.26 inHg) about 725 mi (1,165 km) west-southwest of the southern tip of the Baja California peninsula.
- 18:00 UTC (11:00 a.m. PDT) at 14.3°N 129.9°W – Tropical Depression Eighteen-E strengthens into Tropical Storm Paul about 1,435 mi (2,305 km) west-southwest of the southern tip of the Baja California peninsula.

==== September 26 ====
- 06:00 UTC (11:00 p.m. PDT, September 25) at 20.3°N 119.7°W – Hurricane Olivia weakens to Category 3 intensity about 650 mi (1,045 km) west-southwest of the southern tip of the Baja California peninsula.

==== September 27 ====
- 00:00 UTC (5:00 p.m. PDT, September 26) at 21.1°N 119.3°W – Hurricane Olivia weakens to Category 2 intensity about 610 mi (980 km) west of the southern tip of the Baja California peninsula.
- 00:00 UTC (5:00 p.m. PDT, September 26) at 15.6°N 128.3°W – Tropical Storm Paul reaches peak winds of 45 mph (75 km/h) and a minimum barometric pressure of 1,003 mbar (29.62 inHg) about 1,295 mi (2,085 km) west-southwest of the southern tip of the Baja California peninsula.
- 06:00 UTC (11:00 p.m. PDT, September 26) at 21.1°N 119.1°W – Hurricane Olivia weakens to Category 1 intensity about 600 mi (965 km) west-southwest of the southern tip of the Baja California peninsula.
- 18:00 UTC (11:00 a.m. PDT) at 21.1°N 119.3°W – Hurricane Olivia weakens into a tropical storm about 610 mi (980 km) west of the southern tip of the Baja California peninsula.

==== September 28 ====
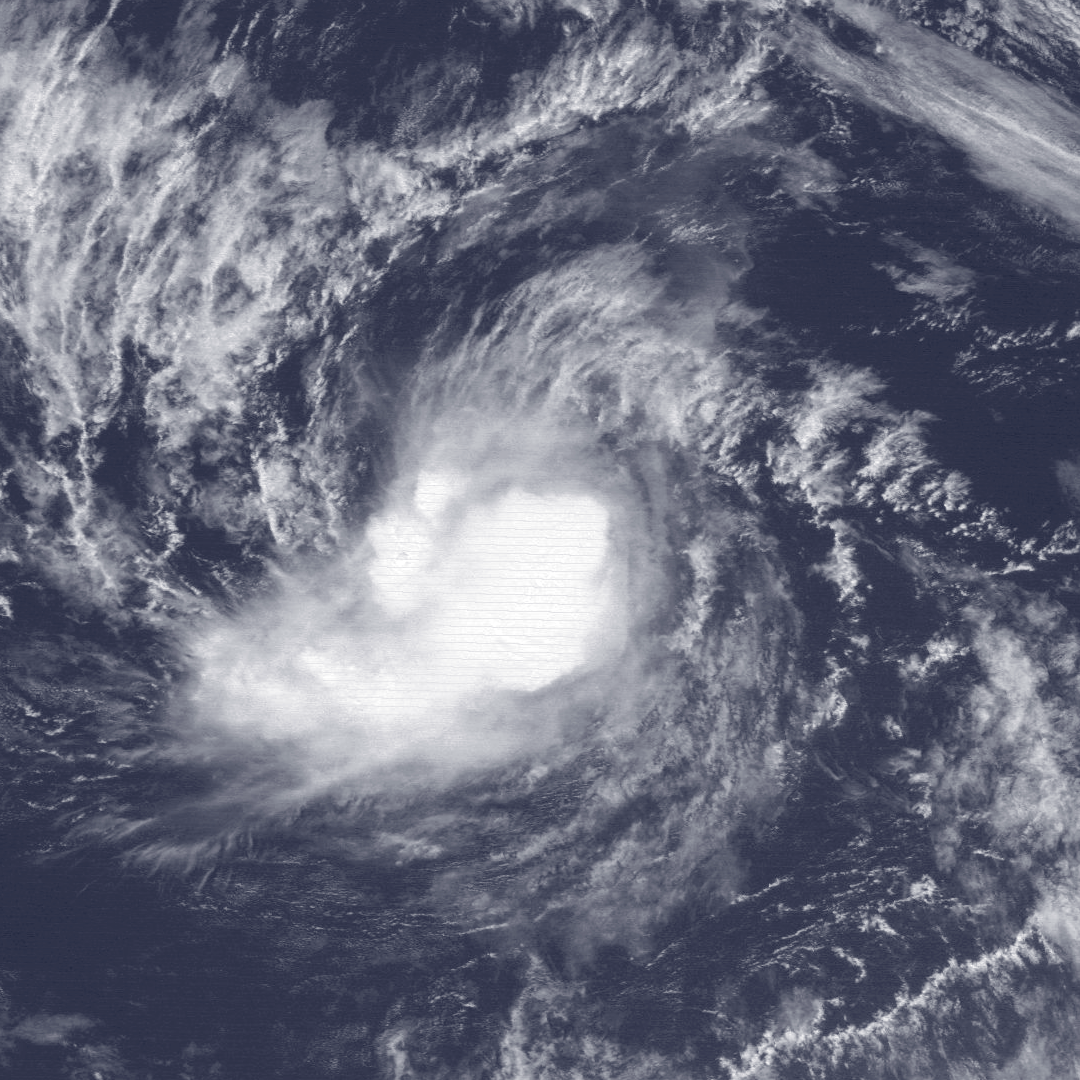
Satellite image of Tropical Storm Paul just prior to peak intensity late on September 26

- 00:00 UTC (5:00 p.m. PDT, September 27) at 15.9°N 125.6°W – Tropical Storm Paul weakens into a tropical depression about 1,130 mi (1,815 km) west-southwest of the southern tip of the Baja California peninsula.
- 12:00 UTC (5:00 a.m. PDT) at 21.6°N 121.2°W – Tropical Storm Olivia weakens into a tropical depression about 725 mi (1,165 km) west of the southern tip of the Baja California peninsula.

==== September 29 ====
- 18:00 UTC (11:00 a.m. PDT) at 22.1°N 125.1°W – Tropical Depression Olivia is last noted about 965 mi (1,555 km) west of the southern tip of the Baja California peninsula; it dissipates shortly thereafter.

==== September 30 ====
- 00:00 UTC (5:00 p.m. PDT, September 29) at 14.6°N 122.4°W – Tropical Depression Paul is last noted about 995 mi (1,605 km) southwest of the southern tip of the Baja California peninsula; it dissipates shortly thereafter.

=== October ===
==== October 8 ====
- 12:00 UTC (5:00 a.m. PDT) at 17.2°N 113.3°W – A tropical depression forms about 450 mi (725 km) south-southwest of the southern tip of the Baja California peninsula.

==== October 11 ====
- 18:00 UTC (11:00 a.m. PDT) at 16.9°N 108.6°W – The aforementioned tropical depression strengthens into Tropical Storm Rosa about 420 mi (675 km) south-southeast of the southern tip of the Baja California peninsula.

==== October 12 ====
- 18:00 UTC (11:00 a.m. PDT) at 17.4°N 108.1°W – Tropical Storm Rosa strengthens into a Category 1 hurricane about 395 mi (640 km) south-southeast of the southern tip of the Baja California peninsula.

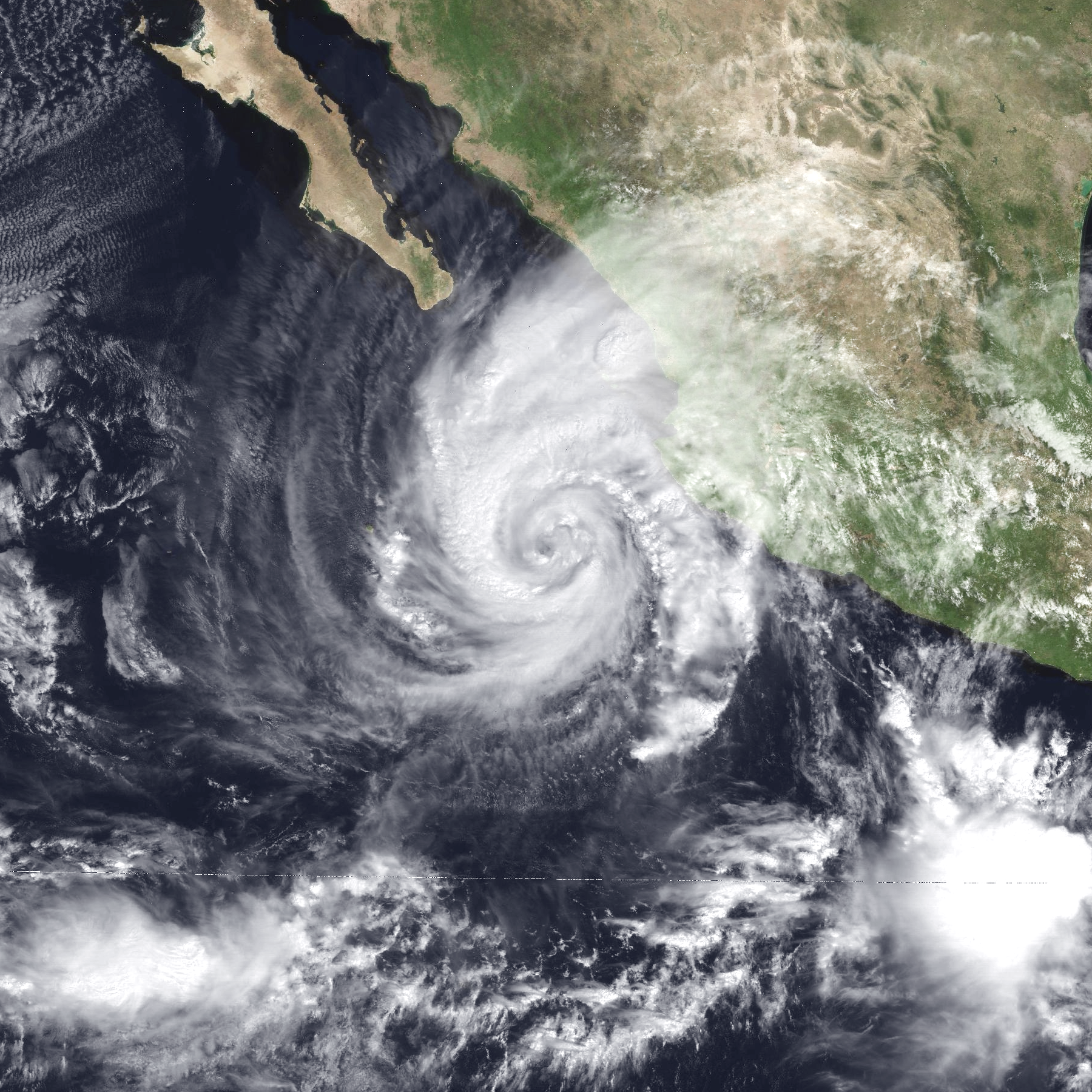
Satellite image of a strengthening Hurricane Rosa approaching the Mexican coast on October 13

==== October 13 ====
- 18:00 UTC (11:00 a.m. PDT) at 18.8°N 107.9°W – Hurricane Rosa strengthens to Category 2 intensity about 310 mi (500 km) south-southeast of the southern tip of the Baja California peninsula.

==== October 14 ====
- 00:00 UTC (5:00 p.m. PDT, October 13) at 19.8°N 107.5°W – Hurricane Rosa reaches peak winds of 105 mph (165 km/h) about 245 mi (400 km) south-southwest of Mazatlán, Sinaloa.
- 06:00 UTC (11:00 p.m. PDT, October 13) at 21.2°N 106.8°W – Hurricane Rosa reaches a minimum barometric pressure of 974 mbar (28.76 inHg) about 145 mi (230 km) south of Mazatlán, Sinaloa.
- 10:00 UTC (3:00 a.m. PDT) at 22.6°N 105.9°W – Hurricane Rosa makes landfall near La Concepción, Sinaloa with winds of 105 mph (165 km/h) and a barometric pressure of 977 mbar (28.85 inHg).
- 12:00 UTC (5:00 a.m. PDT) at 23.0°N 105.5°W – Hurricane Rosa weakens to Category 1 intensity over land about 60 mi (95 km) east-northeast of Mazatlán, Sinaloa.
- 18:00 UTC (11:00 a.m. PDT) at 25.3°N 103.8°W – Hurricane Rosa weakens into a tropical storm over land about 220 mi (350 km) northeast of Mazatlán, Sinaloa.

==== October 15 ====
- 00:00 UTC (5:00 p.m. PDT, October 14) at 28.0°N 101.5°W – Tropical Storm Rosa weakens into a tropical depression over land as it approaches the border between Mexico and Texas; it dissipates six hours later.

==== October 21 ====
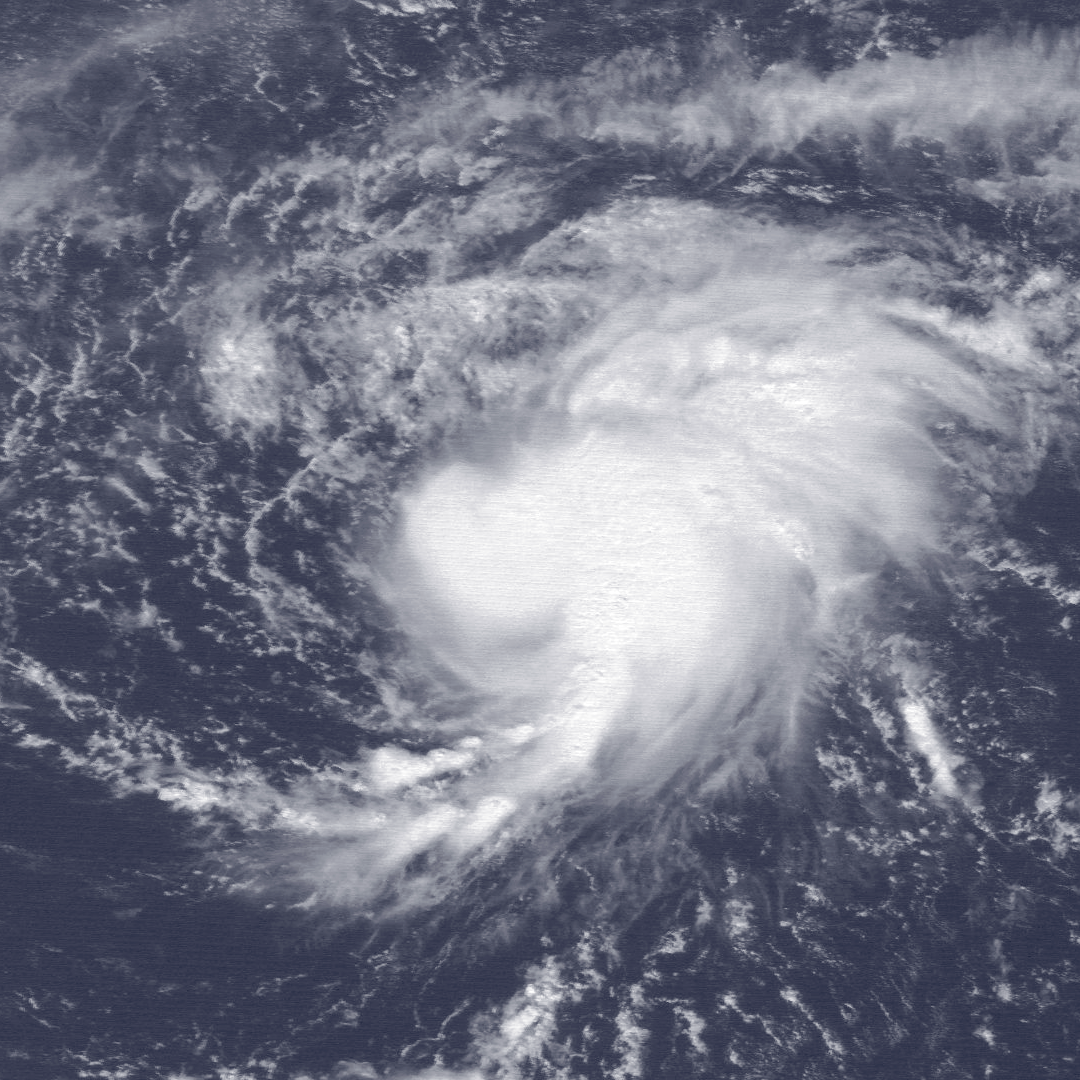
Satellite image of Tropical Depression Three-C, which later became a tropical storm and received the name Nona, on October 22

- 00:00 UTC (2:00 p.m. HST, October 20) at 12.8°N 157.3°W – Tropical Depression Three-C forms about 435 mi (705 km) south-southwest of Ka Lae, Hawaii.

==== October 25 ====
- 12:00 UTC (2:00 a.m. HST) at 12.0°N 168.4°W – Tropical Depression Three-C strengthens into Tropical Storm Nona about 975 mi (1,565 km) west-southwest of Ka Lae, Hawaii; it simultaneously reaches peak winds of 40 mph (65 km/h).
- 18:00 UTC (8:00 a.m. HST) at 12.0°N 169.9°W – Tropical Storm Nona weakens into a tropical depression about 1,060 mi (1,705 km) west-southwest of Ka Lae, Hawaii.

==== October 26 ====
- 00:00 UTC (2:00 p.m. HST, October 25) at 12.2°N 171.4°W – Tropical Depression Nona is last noted about 1,145 mi (1,845 km) west-southwest of Ka Lae, Hawaii; it dissipates six hours later.

=== November ===
- No tropical cyclones were active in November.

==== November 30 ====
- The 1994 Pacific hurricane season officially ends.

== See also ==
- Timeline of the 1994 Atlantic hurricane season
- List of Pacific hurricanes
- Pacific hurricane season
- Tropical cyclones in 1994
